= Embryonal fyn-associated substrate =

Protein-coding gene in the species Homo sapiens

EFS

Identifiers
- Aliases: EFS, CAS3, CASS3, EFS1, EFS2, HSIN, Embryonal fyn-associated substrate
- External IDs: OMIM: 609906; MGI: 105311; GeneCards: EFS
RNA expression pattern
Bgee	Human / Mouse (ortholog); Top expressed in: ganglionic eminence; inferior ganglion of vagus nerve; vulva; middle frontal gyrus; skin of abdomen; subthalamic nucleus; tibial nerve; human penis; medulla oblongata; canal of the cervix / n/a; More reference expression data
BioGPS	n/a
Gene ontology
Molecular function	SH3 domain binding; protein binding; protein domain specific binding
Cellular component	cytoplasm; plasma membrane
Biological process	cell adhesion; intracellular signal transduction; cell migration; actin filament reorganization
Sources:Amigo / QuickGO
Orthologs
Databases	NCBI: entry
Species	Human	Mouse
Entrez	10278	13644
Ensembl	n/a	ENSMUSG00000022203
UniProt	O43281	Q64355
RefSeq (mRNA)	NM_001277174; NM_005864; NM_032459; NM_001385607	NM_010112
RefSeq (protein)	NP_001264103; NP_005855; NP_115835	NP_034242
Location (UCSC)	n/a	n/a
PubMed search
- Wikidata
View/Edit Human	View/Edit Mouse

Embryonal fyn-associated substrate is a protein that in humans is encoded by the EFS gene. It is also known as CASS3.

== History and discovery ==
EFS (Embryonal Fyn-associated Substrate), also known as SIN (Src INteracting or Signal Integrating protein) was originally identified using cDNA library screening of mouse embryonal libraries for proteins containing SH3-interacting domains, or interacting with the SRC SH3 domain, in two independent studies by Ishino et al. in 1995 and Alexandropoulos et al. in 1996.

In humans, the 561 amino acid EFS protein acts as a scaffolding protein for cell signaling based on interactions with SRC, FAK, and other proteins, and has been linked to roles in the function of the immune system, and the development of cancer.

== Gene ==
The chromosomal location of the EFS gene is 14q11.2 and its genomic coordinates are 14:23356400-23365633 on the reverse strand in GRChB38p2 (Genome Reference Consortium Human Build 38 patch release 2). According to the Human Genome Organization (HUGO) Gene Nomenclature Committee (HGNC) its approved symbol is EFS and its synonyms are "Cas scaffolding protein family member 3", CASS3, EFS1, EFS2, HEFS and SIN. The official Gene IDs assigned to EFS are 16898 (HGNC), 10278 (Entrez Gene) and ENSG00000100842 (Ensembl).

In humans, at least three transcript variants are known for EFS: isoform 1, containing 6 exons end encoding the full-length protein with 561 amino acids; isoform 2, containing 5 exons and encoding a shorter protein (468 amino acids in length); and isoform 3, containing 6 exons and encoding the shortest protein (392 amino acids).

Little is known about the transcriptional regulation of EFS, but several transcriptional regulators for EFS have been proposed based on consensus binding sites in its promoter region for ATF (Activating transcription factor), NF-κβ, NF-κβ1, GATA-3, C/EBPα (CCAAT/enhancer-binding protein alpha), glucocorticoid receptors α and β, and p53. Expression of isoforms 1 and 2 has been detected in multiple tissues, with maximal expression in the placenta, and the embryonal central nervous system, heart, testes and lungs. Although its expression has been reported as lower in thymus and lymphocytes, functional studies of EFS to date have best defined it as important for immune system function. One screen for implantation-related genes regulated by progesterone found that EFS was downregulated by 17β-estradiol and progesterone in explants of late proliferative phase endometrium.

== Protein family ==
EFS is a member of the CAS (Crk-Associated Substrate) family of proteins. In humans and mammals, this group consists of four members: p130Cas/BCAR1, NEDD9/HEF1, CASS4 and EFS. There are no paralogous genes for this family in yeasts and fungi, diploblasts and nematodes such as C. elegans. A single ancestral member is found in Drosophila.

== Structure ==
Table 1. EFS structure.
Domain	Position	Length	Function
N-terminal	1 - 4	4 aa	This region has no assigned function
SH3-domain	5-68	64 aa	Binds to proline-rich motif containing proteins, such as FAK, PTK2B, C3G, PTP-PEST, PTP1B, CIZ and FRNK.
SH2-binding region	69 - 350	282 aa	Contains YxxP motifs capable of being phosphorylated on tyrosine residues, then binding SH2 domains.
Serine rich domain	351 - 488	138 aa	Conserved domain structure encompassing 4 α-helices bundle has a docking function.
C-terminal	489 - 561	73 aa	Conserved domain structure encompassing 4 α-helices bundle has a docking function; homo- or heterodimerization; focal adhesion targeting.

As the member of CAS protein family, EFS shares common structural characteristics with other members of the family. This includes 4 defined domains (summarized in Table 1):

- An N-terminal SH3 domain that is highly conserved among the 4 CAS family members, and highly conserved throughout evolution (amino acids 5-68 for human EFS). SH3 domains bind to proline-rich motif containing proteins. The amino acid sequences of the SH3 domains are 70% identical among human EFS, BCAR1, and NEDD9, making this the most highly conserved domain for the whole protein family. Notably, the murine and human EFS SH3 domains are 100% identical, while the rest of the amino acid sequences of mouse and human EFS are only 78% identical. Important binding partners for this region include FAK, PTK2B, C3G, PTP-PEST, PTP1B, CIZ, and FRNK.
- Central "substrate domain" containing multiple repeats of tyrosine residues embedded within specific conserved sequences (YxxP) (amino acids 69-350 for human EFS). This region contains 9 such binding sites, in contrast to family members BCAR1 and NEDD9 (20 and 18 motifs, respectively) and similar to CASS4 (estimated at 10 such motifs). Once phosphorylated by SRC or other kinases, these tyrosine motifs are bound by the SH2 domains of signaling proteins. Important binding partners for this region include Crk1/2 and Crk-L, a Crk1 paralogue.
- A serine-rich domain encompassing a 4 α-helix bundle (amino acids 351-488 for human EFS). Although primary amino acid sequence shows considerable divergence versus other CAS family members in this region, structural analysis predicts that this bundle has a highly conserved fold and provides a docking site for family members.
- A C-terminal domain (489-561 amino acids in human EFS) is highly conserved between family members at both primary amino acid sequence and predicted fold. All CAS proteins except CASS4 contain a YDYVHL motif within this domain, which is an important binding site for the Src SH2 domain. This region is considered to possess a homo- or heterodimerization ability.

There are three protein isoforms of human Efs. hEfs1 and hEfs2 were identified by Ishino et al. hEFS1 (561 aa) represents the human counterpart of mouse embryonal Efs (mEfs1) originally identified. hEFS1 and mEfs1 are 80% identical in their amino acid sequences and 100% identical within the SH3 domain. hEFS2 (468 aa) is identical to hEFS1, except for its lack of the SH3 domain. hEFS3 (392 aa) also lacks a functional SH3 domain and has the same C-terminus and short N-terminal amino acid tail as the full-length protein. Although little functional analysis of hEFS2 has been performed, speculatively, given lack of an SH3 domain, abundant hEFS2 may inhibit hEFS1 signaling by titrating partner proteins. As of 2015, there has been no functional analysis of hEFS3.

== Function ==
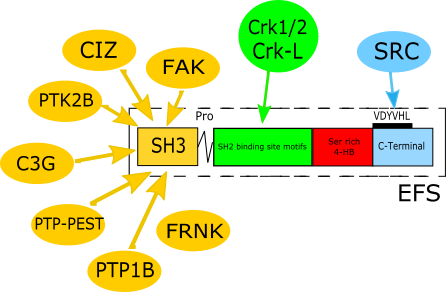
Figure 1. Scheme, representing major proteins interacting with EFS through highly conserved motifs.

As a member of the CAS protein family, EFS is a multi-domain docking molecule that lacks any known enzymatic activity, but instead mediates signaling by promoting protein–protein interactions through conserved sequence motifs (Figure 1).

An important role of EFS as a CAS-family member function is transmission of integrin-initiated signals from the extracellular matrix to downstream effectors, leading to reorganization of the actin cytoskeleton and changes in motility and invasion. The SH3 domain is a point of contact with polyproline sequences on focal adhesion kinase (FAK). or the related kinase PTK2B, also known as RAFTK/Pyk2/CAKβ. Typically, phosphorylation of the C-terminal region of CAS proteins by FAK or PTK2B creates a binding site for the SH2 domain of a SRC-family protein, which then hyper-phosphorylates the substrate domain, allowing the CAS protein to function as a scaffold for other proteins including CRK proteins and C3G, a guanine nucleotide exchange factor (GEF) for RAP1. PTP-PEST, a soluble protein tyrosine phosphatase that is ubiquitously expressed in mice both during embryonic development and in adult tissues, opposes FAK and PTK2B activity, as it dephosphorylates PTK2B, FAK and CAS family members, among other proteins. The PTP-PEST proline-rich sequence ^{332}PPKPPR^{337} has been shown to interact directly with the SH3 domain of members of EFS and another CAS protein, NEDD9.

In normal untransformed cells, EFS acts as a SRC family kinase substrate in neurite outgrowth, a process that is dependent on activity of SRC kinases. Reciprocally, EFS activates SRC signaling through c-CRK and RAP1. Further, SRC directly phosphorylates residues Y576 and Y577 tyrosine sites on the EFS, enhancing targeting FAK, and eventually the solubility and/or stability of the complex. Through SRC, EFS may also negatively regulate expression of E-cadherin at adherens junctions, a function that has been reported for other CAS proteins (NEDD9 and BCAR1); however, this point has not been directly established for EFS.

== Disease association ==
The well-studied CAS proteins BCAR1 and NEDD9 have important roles in cancer and other pathological conditions, which have been addressed in many studies and reviews. EFS has attracted less study. However, the conserved functional properties of EFS relevant to cellular adhesion and migration, and RTK signaling, suggest changes in activity of this protein may also be relevant to cancer and other disease states, influencing prognosis and therapeutic response. The changes in EFS expression and post-translational modification in the context of disease discussed below are summarized in Table 2.

Disease	Study finding for EFS
Crohn's disease	The study linked EFS gene to Crohn's disease (p-value 0.039) in humans.
Rheumatic fever susceptibility	Significantly increased expression after stimulation of peripheral blood mononuclear cells from patients with rheumatoid heart disease.
Prostate cancer	CpG site hypermethylation of EFS was associated with prediction of biochemical, local, and systemic recurrence of prostate cancer. Decreased EFS expression was shown in advanced prostate cancer compared to normal tissue, which correlated with high metastatic potential.
Uveal melanoma	High frequency of promoter CpG site methylation and association with a higher risk of metastatic progression.
HER2+ breast cancer	EFS may play a role in trastuzumab resistance mechanism.
Prolactinoma	EFS may be involved in stem cell regulation, tumor cell invasion, tumor recurrence, and drug resistance.
Gestational choriocarcinoma	Located in a frequently amplified chromosomal region along with >100 other genes.
Glioblastoma multiforme	One of the genes differentially expressed in two sub-groups of glioblastoma multiforme defined by gene expression profile.
Chediak-Higashi syndrome	Direct interaction with LYST protein, which is associated with lysosomal trafficking.
Human endometrium expression profiling	Down regulated by 17β-estradiol and progesterone in explants of late proliferative phase endometrium.

=== Role in inflammation and T-Cell function ===
EFS regulates T-cell function and maturation, preventing expansion of autoreactive clones and pathological immune responses. Two studies that have reported that EFS expression in medullar thymus epithelial cells is important for negative selection of T-cells during their development, which implies an important role of EFS in maintaining immune homeostasis and autoimmunity prevention. In these studies, mice with defective EFS progressed normally during embryogenesis but then developed massive inflammatory lesions in multiple tissues that bore a striking histological resemblance to inflammatory bowel diseases such as Crohn's disease. Mechanistically, EFS expressed in medullary thymic epithelial cells (mTECs) is crucial for their functional maturation and growth factor-mediated expansion. mTECs are important for proper T-cell maturation and negative selection of autoreactive clones, required for development of immunological self-tolerance.

EFS has mostly a repressive role of EFS on processes associated with the activation of mature T-cells, including IL-2 pro-inflammatory cytokine secretion and IL-2-dependent clonal expansion of T cells. Upon T-cell receptor (TCR) stimulation, EFS dephosphorylation and release of the SRC family kinase FYN and phospholipase C-γ normally lead to self-limitation of the immune response. Consistent with this mechanism, EFS overexpression in T cell-derived cell lines decreased IL-2 concentration in supernatants in response to TCR stimulation, while T cells derived from mice lacking EFS gene showed increased IL-2 production. A dual role of EFS in mature T cells function has been proposed because both overexpression and siRNA knockdown of this protein in cell models resulted in decreased transcriptional activation of IL-2 dependent promoters following TCR stimulation.

Altered EFS function has been associated with various human immunopathological conditions. Although an initial genome-wide association studies (GWAS) study of Crohn's disease did not identify EFS, EFS single nucleotide polymorphisms (SNPs) were subsequently linked to Crohn's disease. SNPs linked to EFS are trans-acting, potentially affecting the level of EFS expression but not its coding sequence.

Another study suggested that EFS might contribute to acute rheumatic fever susceptibility. In this work, peripheral blood mononuclear cells (PBMCs) from patients with rheumatoid heart disease (RHD) and control subjects that had never experienced acute rheumatoid fever were stimulated with rheumatogenic and non-rheumatogenic group A streptococci (GAS) strains. EFS was one of only four genes with significantly increased expression in both arms of the study: 1) RHD patient versus control PBMCs after stimulation of both groups with rheumatogenic GAS and 2) RHD patient PBMC stimulated with rheumatogenic versus non-rheumatogenic GAS. Another study has implicated EFS in the Chediak-Higashi syndrome (CHS). This rare and severe autosomal recessive disorder associated with partial albinism, peripheral neuropathy, mild coagulation defects and propensity to recurrent bacterial and fungal infections, caused by incomplete phagocytosis due to failure in phagolysosome formation. This work identified a direct interaction in vitro and in vivo between EFS and LYST (lysosomal trafficking regulator, aka CHS1 - Chediak-Higashi syndrome 1), a large protein that regulates the intracellular trafficking of proteins through endosomes that is mutated in CHS. These results may imply the role of EFS as a disease progression modifier, although further testing and establishment of mechanism is necessary.

=== Cancer ===
At the level of EFS mRNA expression, the local and systemic recurrence of prostate cancer is associated with CpG site hypermethylation of number of genes, including FLNC and EFS (p ≤ .03), both genes involved in cell attachment, and is predicted to result in reduction of gene expression. EFS expression was strongly downregulated in hormonal therapy resistant PC346DCC, PC346Flu1 and PC346Flu2 prostate cancer cells compared to therapy responsive PC346C cells. Another study found that decreased EFS mRNA expression levels are observed in higher Gleason score prostate cancer samples. Low EFS expression also correlated with malignant behavior of the PC-3 and LNCaP prostate cancer cells.

In another study, methylation of the EFS CpG island was observed in 69% of cases of uveal melanoma (UM) and only UM with EFS methylation gave rise to metastases. RT-PCR expression analysis revealed a significant inverse correlation between EFS mRNA expression with EFS methylation in UM. EFS methylation was tissue-specific with full methylation in peripheral blood cells, but no methylation in other tissues such as fetal muscle, kidney and brain.

The EFS gene is one of more than 100 of the genes located in a centromeric 10.21 Mb "minimal critical region" on Chromosome 14 that are highly expressed in gestational choriocarcinoma. The EFS mRNA was also identified as differentially expressed in two of the three groups of glioblastoma multiforme as identified by gene expression profiles (GEPs). EFS was differentially expressed in the GEP1 and GEP3 groups, which were associated with worse prognosis, with more significant cytogenetic abnormalities and genomic instabilities observed in this groups.

At the level of the EFS protein, a study of BT474 breast cancer cells found significant increases in expression of EFS and other proteins relevant to SRC kinase signaling, including CDCP1/Trask and Paxillin, in trastuzumab (Herceptin) resistant versus sensitive cells Importantly, EFS knockdown with siRNA restored trastuzumab sensitivity. Reflecting the importance of post-translational modification of CAS proteins, in a study of cell lines and tumor tissue in melanoma, EFS phosphorylation and activity significantly decreased (p<0.05) in response to vemurafenib treatment in BRAF wild-type melanoma tumors comparing to ones with BRAF (V600E-vemurfenib resistant) mutation. Finally, in a 2013 study of castration-resistant prostate cancer, EFS was identified as having significantly increased gross phosphorylation levels in samples from androgen-deprived (AD), long-term AD treated, or castration-resistant prostate carcinoma xenografts, versus in androgen deprivation therapy-naıve xenografts

== Clinical significance ==
Based on the above discussion, it is possible that therapeutic benefits can be achieved by using EFS expression or phosphorylation as a marker of disease progression and prognosis in some forms of cancer. Further assessment of EFS expression, mutational status, and potential polymorphic variants may be of use in understanding the biology and developing treatment strategies for immune system pathologies such as CHS. There are currently no therapeutic approaches targeting EFS, and given the protein lacks a catalytic domain and extracellular moieties, it may be challenging to generate such agents.
