= NEDD9 =

Protein-coding gene in the species Homo sapiens

Identifiers
- Aliases: NEDD9, CAS-L, CAS2, CASL, CASS2, HEF1, neural precursor cell expressed, developmentally down-regulated 9
- External IDs: OMIM: 602265; MGI: 97302; GeneCards: NEDD9
Available structures
PDB	Ortholog search: PDBe RCSB
PDB	List of PDB id codes 2L81

Gene location (Human)
Chr.	Chromosome 6 (human)
Band	6p24.2	Start	11,183,298 bp
Band	6p24.2	End	11,382,348 bp

Gene location (Mouse)
Chr.	Chromosome 13 (mouse)
Band	13|13 A3.3- A4	Start	41,463,057 bp
Band	13|13 A3.3- A4	End	41,640,838 bp
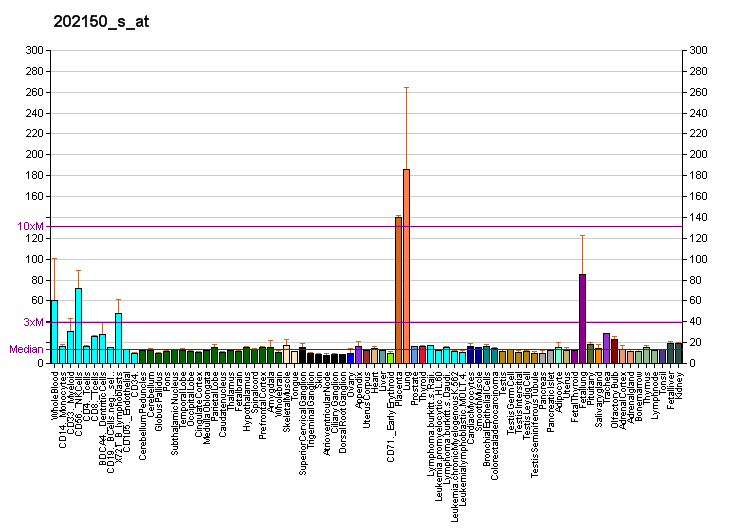

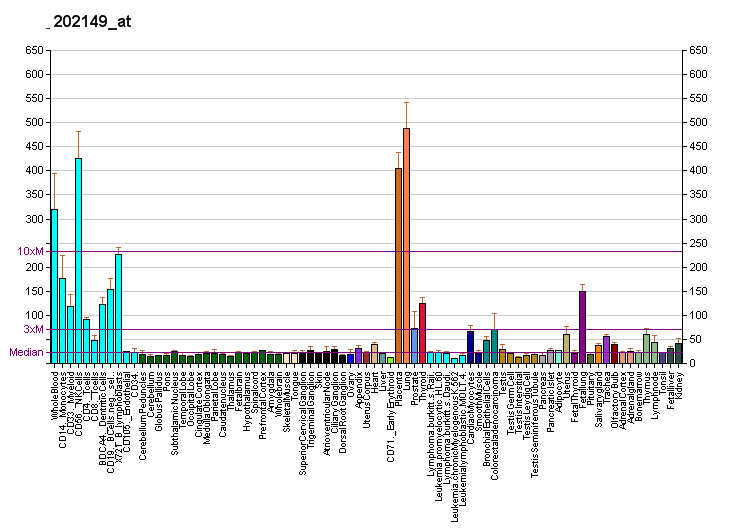
RNA expression pattern
Bgee	Human / Mouse (ortholog); Top expressed in: right lung; lower lobe of lung; glomerulus; metanephric glomerulus; upper lobe of lung; upper lobe of left lung; tail of epididymis; parotid gland; corpus epididymis; caput epididymis / Top expressed in: cumulus cell; left lung lobe; Gonadal ridge; granulocyte; right lung lobe; decidua; gastrula; left colon; molar; ciliary body; More reference expression data
BioGPS	More reference expression data
Gene ontology
Molecular function	protein binding; protein tyrosine kinase binding
Cellular component	cytoplasm; cell junction; Golgi apparatus; spindle; cell cortex; spindle pole; cell projection; cytoskeleton; nucleus; focal adhesion; lamellipodium; nucleoplasm; cytosol; plasma membrane
Biological process	integrin-mediated signaling pathway; regulation of growth; cell cycle; cell adhesion; cytoskeleton organization; signal transduction; actin filament bundle assembly; cell division; positive regulation of cell migration; positive regulation of protein tyrosine kinase activity; positive regulation of substrate adhesion-dependent cell spreading; cell migration; actin filament reorganization; activation of GTPase activity
Sources:Amigo / QuickGO
Orthologs
Databases	NCBI: entry; OMA: entry
Species	Human	Mouse
Entrez	4739	18003
Ensembl	ENSG00000111859	ENSMUSG00000021365
UniProt	Q14511	O35177
RefSeq (mRNA)	NM_001142393; NM_001271033; NM_006403; NM_182966	NM_001111324; NM_017464
RefSeq (protein)	NP_001135865; NP_001257962; NP_006394; NP_892011	NP_001104794; NP_059492
Location (UCSC)	Chr 6: 11.18 – 11.38 Mb	Chr 13: 41.46 – 41.64 Mb
PubMed search
- Wikidata
View/Edit Human	View/Edit Mouse

Neural precursor cell expressed developmentally down-regulated protein 9 (NEDD-9) is a protein that in humans is encoded by the NEDD9 gene. NEDD-9 is also known as enhancer of filamentation 1 (EF1), CRK-associated substrate-related protein (CAS-L), and Cas scaffolding protein family member 2 (CASS2). An important paralog of this gene is BCAR1.

== Discovery ==
In 1992, Kumar, et al., first described a sequence tag corresponding to the NEDD9 3′ untranslated region based on the cloning of a group of genes predominantly expressed in the brain of embryonic, but not adult mice, a group of genes designated neural precursor cell expressed, developmentally down-regulated. In 1996, two groups independently described the complete sequence of the NEDD9 gene, and provided initial functional analysis of NEDD9 protein. Law et al. overexpressed a human cDNA library in S. cerevisiae, and screened for genes that simultaneously affected cell cycle and cell polarity controls, inducing a filamentous yeast budding phenotype, and thus identified the HEF1 protein (Human Enhancer of Filamentation 1). This study identified HEF1/NEDD9 as an interactive partner for focal adhesion kinase (FAK), connecting it to integrin signaling. Separately, Minegishi et al. cloned the gene encoding a protein hyperphosphorylated following ligation of β1-integrins in T cells and hypothesized to play a role in the process of T cell costimulation, designating this gene Cas-L (Crk-associated substrate-related protein, Lymphocyte type).

== Gene ==
The genomic coordinates of the NEDD9 gene are 6:11,183,530-11,382,580 in the GRCh37 assembly, or 6:11,183,298-11,382,348 in the GRCh38 assembly. The gene is on the minus strand. The cytogenetic location is 6p25-p24, based on the nomenclature developed by the Human Genome Organization (HUGO) gene nomenclature committee (HGNC). NEDD9 is the HGNC approved symbol. Official IDs are 7733 (HGNC), 4739 (Entrez Gene), and ENSG00000111859 (Ensembl). CAS-L, CASL, HEF1, dJ49G10.2, dJ761I2.1, CAS2, CASS2 are alias symbols. The NEDD9 gene is conserved in Rhesus monkeys, dogs, cows, mice, rats, chickens, zebrafish, and frogs. In vertebrates, it is a member of a 4-gene family, with the other paralogous genes known as BCAR1 (p130Cas), EFS (Sin), and CASS4 (HEPL)

The NEDD9 promoter has 2 transcriptional start sites. The transcript variants NM_006403.3 and NM_001142393.1 encode proteins that have distinct N-termini (MKYK and MWTR, respectively). In mouse, the two alternative first exons are MKYK and MWAR. Their function is not known. NM_001142393 initiates translation at an upstream location compared to NM_006403.3, but both transcripts have 7 exons. Shorter transcripts with missing exons or an alternative 3' terminal exon have been detected in various studies; however, their role in the cell is unclear.

The 5' region of the NEDD9 promoter is regulated by all-trans retinoic acid (ATRA), and contains a retinoic acid response element (RARE) that is specifically bound by a retinoid X receptor (RXR)/retinoic acid receptor (RAR) heterodimer. NEDD9 is also induced by the environmental pollutant dioxin, based on regulation through the aryl hydrocarbon receptor (AhR). One study has found NEDD9 repressed by estrogen, based on binding of the SAFB1 co-repressor. NEDD9 is induced by Wnt signaling in colon cancer, based on binding to T-cell factor (TCF) factors in the promoter region. NEDD9 is induced by hypoxia and loss of VHL, based on binding of hypoxia-induced factor (HIF) transcription factors to the NEDD9 promoter. Prostaglandin E2 induces NEDD9 transcription. The Fox transcription factor Forkhead box C1 (FoxC1) and PAX5 transcription factor have been reported to induce NEDD9 transcription. TGF-beta induces NEDD9 transcription. Based on inspection of sequence, the NEDD9 promoter also has potential binding sites for a number of additional transcription factors, including STAT5A and NF-kappa B.

In the 3'UTR of NEDD9 is a match to positions 2-8 of mature miR-145. NEDD9-binding regions in the miR-145 locus would allow the direct binding of the NEDD9 3'UTR to the genomic region of miR-145, and some studies suggests this miR regulates NEDD9 in glioblastoma prostate cancer, and renal cell carcinoma cells. A non-coding RNA, named B2, extending from 10 kb upstream of NEDD9 exon 1 to exon 4 has been described, but the functional role for this ncRNA is not yet clear. NEDD9 is highly expressed in the embryonal brain, and in numerous tissues in the embryo and adult organism. Elevated expression is associated with cancer, as discussed below.

== Protein family ==
NEDD9 is a member of the CAS (Crk-associated substrate) protein family, which has 4 members in vertebrates. The other paralogous genes are known BCAR1 (p130Cas), EFS (Sin), and CASS4 (HEPL). There is no detectable NEDD9-related gene in bacteria, yeast, or C. elegans. A single family member exists in D. Melanogaster, termed DCas.

== Structure ==
In humans, NEDD9 is 834 amino acids long. NEDD9 is a noncatalytic scaffolding protein that contains docking sites for proteins involved in multiple signal transduction pathways, regulating magnitude and duration of cell signaling cascades The overall structure of NEDD9 is represented graphically in Figure 1.

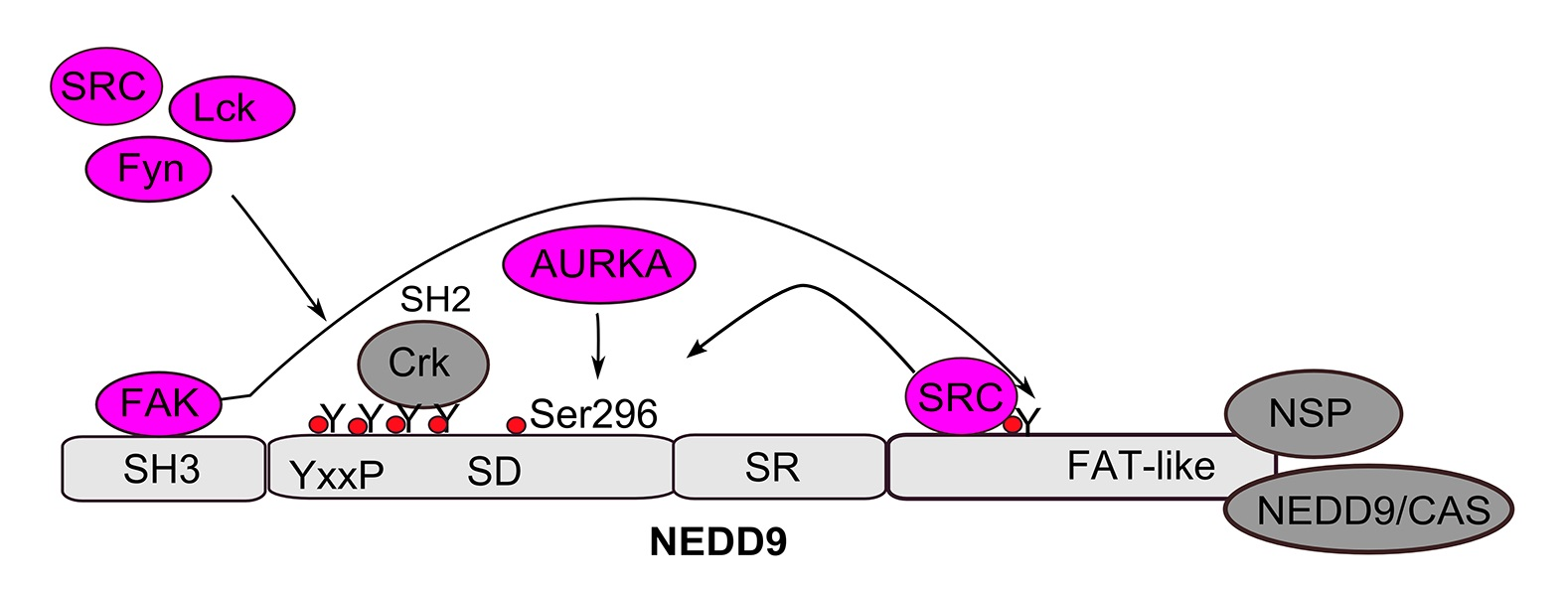
NEDD9 structure

These domains include:

SH3 domain
This highly conserved N-terminal domain mediates NEDD9 binding to the polyproline motifs of a number of important interacting proteins, with some well-studied partners being FAK and the related PYK2/RAFTK kinase, C3G, PTP-PEST, PTP1B and CIZ.
Substrate domain (SD)
This unstructured region contains multiple YxxP motifs, which are phosphorylated by src family kinases (such as FYN, LCK and SRC) to create binding sites for proteins with SH2 domains, such as Crk. Phosphorylation of these motifs can be activated by mechanical forces such as cytoskeletal stretch. Other phosphorylation events in this region are imposed by the kinase Aurora-A, which phosphorylates residue S296, for processes related to cell cycle control.
Serine rich (SR) region
The SR region likely folds into a 4-helix bundle, based on substantial predicted homology to BCAR1, for which the structure has been solved.
Focal adhesion targeting (FAT) domain
The FAT-like C-terminal domain is highly conserved in focal adhesion proteins, and sufficient for localizing focal adhesion kinase (FAK) to focal adhesions. It forms a four-helix bundle structure and implicated in interaction with NSP proteins (novel SH2-containing protein family), and other proteins such as the Id family of helix-loop-helix proteins.

In terms of post-translational modifications, NEDD9 is subject to significant phosphorylation based on growth conditions. In most actively growing adherent cells, NEDD9 migrates as a doublet of 115 and 105 kDa. Serine/threonine hyper-phosphorylated p115 NEDD9 is more common in G2/M phase cells, suggesting these modifications are associated with increased localization to centrosome and mitotic spindle. One study indicated the conversion of p115 into p105 is activated by cell detachment through cytoskeletal regulation of phosphatase PP2A, although other work has found conflicting results.

== Synthesis and degradation ==
NEDD9 is present throughout cell cycle, but most abundant in G2/M phase cells. NEDD9 is subject to both caspase cleavage and proteasomal degradation. In conditions of cell detachment, and particularly in early stages of anoikis or apoptosis, NEDD9 is rapidly cleaved by caspases 3 and/or 7 at a DLVD site (residue 363), and at a DDYD site (residue 630) to form N-terminal 55 KDa and C-terminal 28 KDa fragments forms. This cleavage is prevented by focal adhesion formation, which suggests NEDD9 as a sensor of altered adhesion states. Overexpression of p28 in cells causes cellular rounding and detachment, and induces apoptosis, probably because of a dominant-negative effect on survival-promoting signaling complexes at focal adhesions. Together this data suggests that production of different NEDD9 posttranslational modifications is regulated by cell de/attachment, which, in turn, allows regulation of NEDD9 turnover and participation in distinct cellular processes.

P115 is the primary target for proteasomal degradation of NEDD9. Proteasomal degradation of NEDD9 is triggered by a number of stimuli, including induction of TGF-beta signaling. An effector of the TGFbeta receptor, Smad3, may interact directly with APC subunit APC10 and thus recruit the APC complex. CDH1 subunit of the APC complex recognizes NEDD9 and regulates ubiquitination and subsequent degradation of NEDD9. NEDD9 is also degraded by the proteasome at the end of mitosis, following completion of activities with Aurora-A that support mitotic progression.

== Tissue distribution and intracellular localization ==
In interphase cells, the majority of NEDD9 localizes to focal adhesions. However, some of the protein is also cytoplasmic, and small pools localize to the centrosome and the basal body of cilia. At mitotic entry NEDD9 moves along mitotic spindle, eventually localizing at midbody at cytokinesis.

== Function ==
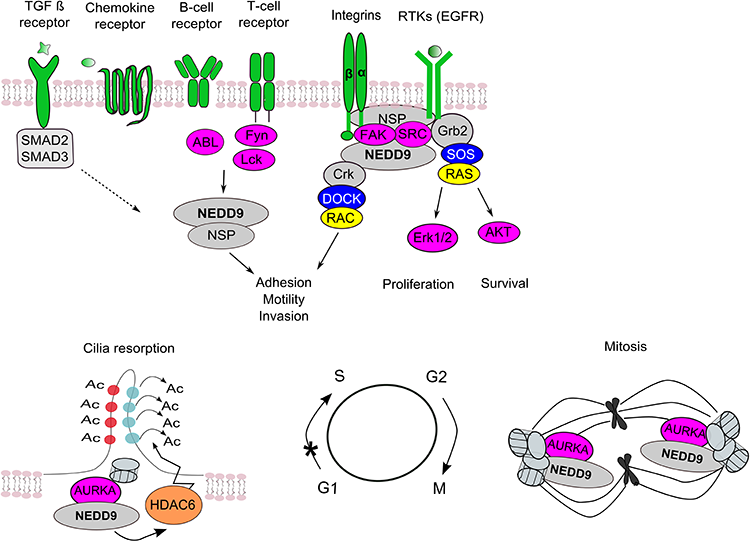
NEDD9 mediated signaling

NEDD9 is an intermediate in a number of important signaling pathways relevant to the cellular processes of proliferation, survival, migration, and others (see figure to the right).

=== Integrin, FAK/RAFTK, and SRC kinases ===
Integrin signaling, which control cell movement, spreading and adhesion to extracellular matrix (ECM), and survival, is the best established signaling pathway for NEDD9. Integrins are transmembrane proteins that nucleate focal adhesions, structures that provide bi-directional signaling between ECM and actin cytoskeleton. NEDD9 stabilizes formation and regulates turnover of focal adhesions, influencing cell motility and the invasion and metastasis of cancer cells. In response to integrin activation, FAK or the related kinase RAFTK recruits NEDD9 into a focal adhesion site, binds it via the N-terminal SH3 domain and phosphorylates the NEDD9 Src-binding site. This allows SRC or SRC family kinase to bind NEDD9 via its SH2 domain. Phosphorylation of the NEDD9 substrate domain by Src and other kinases results in the creation of binding sites for Crk and other adaptors that associate with SH2 binding motifs. NEDD9 Crk complexes activate Rho and Ras family GTPases via the recruitment of their nucleotide exchange factors (GEFs), such as DOCK1, DOCK3 DOCK180 and C3G.

These GTPases regulate cell motility, proliferation and also contribute to tumor progression and invasion. In many cell types, NEDD9 overexpression increases spreading and crescent morphology (an indicator of high motility). However, in fibroblasts, some work has found that absence of NEDD9 leads to more rapid focal adhesion turnover, which led to increase of migration in NEDD9-/- compared to wild type.

In cancer cells, NEDD9 can drive mesenchymal-type movement by activating RAC1 GTPase and WAVE in complex with its GEF DOCK3, which in turn cause inhibition of GTPase Rho and amoeboid movement. Invasion is accompanied by proteolysis of the ECM through activation of MMP14, MMP2 and MMP9 metalloproteinases.

=== Chemokine receptors, TCR, BCR/ABL, Fyn, Lck kinases ===
NEDD9 is involved in chemokine-induced T cell migration and T cell receptor (TCR)–mediated integrin activation. In lymphocytes, integrin or TCR signaling induces NEDD9 phosphorylation by tyrosine kinases Fyn and Lck (SRC family kinases), which is essential for T cell migration. In addition, in response to chemokine signals, Abl family kinases promote GTPase RAP1 activation by phosphorylating of NEDD9; NEDD9 associates with the transducer protein Chat-H/SHEP1/NSP3, a member of the NSP protein family, further supporting RAP1 activation, cell migration, and adhesion. In B cells, NEDD9 association with NSP3 enhances integrin-mediated NEDD9 serine/threonine hyperphosphorylation following B cell receptor (BCR) ligation, promoting B lymphocyte adhesion, motility and homing into marginal zones of spleen Estrogen Receptor. The NEDD9 interactors p130/CAS and the NSP protein NSP2/BCAR3 are implicated in antiestrogen resistance and breast cancer progression Some data suggests a role for NEDD9 in the cellular response to estrogen, including the progression to anti-estrogen resistance, breast cancer progression and invasion

RTKs (EGFR). NEDD9 also contributes to the transduction of signals downstream receptor tyrosine kinases (RTKs). A role for NEDD9 in signaling crosstalk between epidermal growth factor receptor (EGFR) and integrins was established in non-small lung cancer (NSLC). It was shown that inhibition of EGFR reduces the tyrosine phosphorylation of NEDD9. Nedd9 interacts directly with the EGFR effector protein Shc, positioning it to affect downstream signaling relevant to EGFR; mice lacking Nedd9 have depressed activity of the EGFR effectors ERK and AKT. NSP proteins are also multidomain scaffolds, which bind activated RTKs in response to extracellular stimuli and recruit both NEDD9 and BCAR1 to assist in integrating signaling between RTKs and integrins. NEDD9 is also activated by PDGF and other RTKs, although more study is required.

=== TGF-beta ===
TGF-beta is a regulator of tissue remodeling and epithelial-mesenchymal transition (EMT) in development, and promotes metastasis in cancer. A number of studies have identified NEDD9 as a downstream effector in the TGF-beta signaling pathway, essential for promoting EMT. In MCF-7 cells, NEDD9 negatively regulates expression of the epithelial protein E-cadherin, preventing association of E-cadherin with cell membrane and activating SRC-kinase. Activated SRC provides internalization and lysosomal degradation of E-cadherin. Consistent with these findings is a study demonstrating downregulation of epithelial markers (E-cadherin, occludin, β-catenin) and concurrent upregulation of mesenchymal markers (N-cadherin, vimentin, fibronectin) in response to NEDD9 overexpression in MCF-10 cells.

=== Aurora-A ===
NEDD9 binds directly to the Aurora-A mitotic kinase at the centrosome, and promotes its activity, allowing cells to enter mitosis. Degradation of NEDD9 at the end of mitosis contributes to timely Aurora-A degradation. Cells overexpressing NEDD9 exhibit deficient cytokinesis resulting in the accumulation of multipolar mitotic spindles and abnormal numbers of centrosomes. On the other hand, cells with depleted NEDD9 have prematurely separated centrosomes and are deficient in microtubule organizing activity during mitosis, leading to an abundance of monopolar or asymmetric spindles, preventing cells from entering mitosis. NEDD9 also regulates Aurora-A activation at the basal body of cilia as cells resorb cilia during early G1. Cilia are small organelles that protrude from the surface of adherent cells that are the obligate site of action for proteins such as Hedgehog, and the polycystins: by influencing ciliary stability, NEDD9 is positioned to affect these signaling systems. Interaction of NEDD9 with Aurora A kinase may also play a role in tumor invasion. NEDD9 binds to and regulates acetylation of cortactin (CTTN) in an Aurora A kinase (AURKA)/HDAC6–dependent manner. The knockdown of NEDD9 or AURKA results in an increase in the amount of acetylated CTTN and a decrease in the binding of CTTN to F-actin. Overexpression of the deacetylation mimicking (9KR) mutant of CTTN is sufficient to restore actin dynamics at the leading edge and migration proficiency of the tumor cells. Inhibition of AURKA and HDAC6 activity by alisertib and tubastatin A in xenograft models of breast cancer has led to a decrease in the number of pulmonary metastases.

== Clinical significance ==
Transgenic mice with homozygous depletion of NEDD9 are vital and fertile, but have immunological abnormalities that result in pre-malignant conditions later in life, defects are initially subtle, but increase in later life; B cell homing to the spleen and lymphocyte trafficking are deficient.

=== Alzheimer's disease ===
The NEDD9 rs760678 SNP located in an intronic region, has been studied for a possible association with late onset Alzheimer's disease (LOAD). However, in 2012, Wang et al., performed a meta-analysis and concluded that more studies are required for solid conclusions. This SNP and relevant signaling is discussed more fully in.

=== Cancer ===
Altered (typically elevated) expression of NEDD9 is strongly associated with cancer. NEDD9 is rarely if ever mutated, but frequently show altered expression or phosphorylation (associated with increased activity) in pathological conditions including immune cell dysfunction and cancer. NEDD9 overexpression is documented to occur and in some cases linked the process of tumorigenesis of many different malignances. Besides examples in breast cancer discussed above, these malignancies include colon, pancreatic, head and neck, ovarian, gastric, lung, genitourinary (including prostate), liver, and kidney cancer, gastrointestinal stromal tumors, glioblastoma, and neuroblastoma.

=== Other disease ===
Nedd9 expression may be important for recovery from stroke. Nedd9 is upregulated in the neurons of the cerebral cortex and hippocampus after transient global ischemia in rats. Induced Nedd9 is tyrosine phosphorylated, bound to FAK in dendrite and soma of neurons, and promotes neurite outgrowth, contributing into recovery of neurologic function after cerebral ischemia. Nedd9 has recently been implicated in the pathogenesis of autosomal dominant polycystic kidney disease (ADPKD). NEDD9 expression is elevated in human autosomal dominant polycystic kidney disease (ADPKD) and in mouse ADPKD models, and ADPKD-prone mice lacking NEDD9 developed a more severe form of ADPKD than those with normal NEDD9.

=== Therapeutic potential ===
Because of its roles in cancer, several studies have considered the potential value of NEDD9 as a therapeutic target or therapeutic guide. Because of lack of a kinase domain, or any defined catalytic domain, and because it is entirely intracellular, NEDD9 is a difficult molecule to target. Because NEDD9 serves as a scaffolding molecule for other signaling proteins that play significant roles in cancer development, the effects of NEDD9 overexpression in supporting metastasis could in theory be mitigated by inhibition of its downstream targets. In one study, deletion of Nedd9 in MMTV-neu mammary tumors increased their sensitivity to inhbitiors of FAK and SRC. NEDD9 depletion sensitizes breast tumor cell lines to the Aurora A inhibitor alisertib. Consideration of NEDD9 as a biomarker for therapeutic response is a promising research direction.

== Interactions ==
NEDD9 has been shown to interact with:

- ABL1,
- AURKA,
- CDH1,
- CRK,
- CRKL,
- ID2,
- LYN,
- MICAL1,
- NCK1,
- NSP,
- PTK2,
- SMAD3, and
- SRC.
