= CASS4 =

Protein-coding gene in the species Homo sapiens

Identifiers
- Aliases: CASS4, C20orf32, CAS4, HEFL, HEPL, Cas scaffolding protein family member 4, Cas scaffold protein family member 4
- External IDs: MGI: 2444482; GeneCards: CASS4
Available structures
PDB	Ortholog search: PDBe RCSB
PDB	List of PDB id codes 2CRE

Gene location (Human)
Chr.	Chromosome 20 (human)
Band	20q13.31	Start	56,412,112 bp
Band	20q13.31	End	56,460,387 bp

Gene location (Mouse)
Chr.	Chromosome 2 (mouse)
Band	2|2 H3	Start	172,235,714 bp
Band	2|2 H3	End	172,275,677 bp
RNA expression pattern
Bgee	Human / Mouse (ortholog); Top expressed in: upper lobe of left lung; blood; right lung; granulocyte; appendix; monocyte; testicle; buccal mucosa cell; gallbladder; spleen / Top expressed in: left lung lobe; blood; granulocyte; embryo; embryo; bone marrow; right lung lobe; mesenteric lymph nodes; sciatic nerve; epiblast; More reference expression data
BioGPS	n/a
Gene ontology
Molecular function	structural constituent of cytoskeleton; protein tyrosine kinase binding
Cellular component	cytoplasm; cell junction; cytoskeleton; focal adhesion; plasma membrane
Biological process	cell adhesion; positive regulation of cell migration; positive regulation of protein tyrosine kinase activity; positive regulation of substrate adhesion-dependent cell spreading; cell migration; actin filament reorganization
Sources:Amigo / QuickGO
Orthologs
Databases	NCBI: entry; OMA: entry
Species	Human	Mouse
Entrez	57091	320664
Ensembl	ENSG00000087589	ENSMUSG00000074570
UniProt	Q9NQ75	Q08EC4
RefSeq (mRNA)	NM_001164114; NM_001164115; NM_001164116; NM_020356	NM_001033538; NM_001080820; NM_001276422; NM_001276423; NM_001379465 NM_001379466; NM_001379467
RefSeq (protein)	NP_001157586; NP_001157587; NP_001157588; NP_065089	NP_001074289; NP_001263351; NP_001263352; NP_001366394; NP_001366395 NP_001366396
Location (UCSC)	Chr 20: 56.41 – 56.46 Mb	Chr 2: 172.24 – 172.28 Mb
PubMed search
- Wikidata
View/Edit Human	View/Edit Mouse

Cas scaffolding protein family member 4 is a protein that in humans is encoded by the CASS4 gene.

== History and discovery ==
CASS4 (Crk associated substrate 4) is the fourth and last described member of the CAS protein family. CASS4 was detected by Singh et al. in 2008 following in silico screening of databases describing expressed sequence tags from an evolutionarily diverse group of organisms, using the CAS-related proteins (p130Cas, NEDD9/HEF1 and EFS) mRNAs as templates. Singh et al. subsequently cloned and characterized the CASS4 gene, originally assigning the name HEPL (HEF1-EFS-p130Cas-like) for similarity to the other three defined CAS genes. The official name was subsequently changed to CASS4 by the Human Genome Organization (HUGO) Gene Nomenclature Committee (HGNC).

== Gene ==
The chromosomal location of the CASS4 gene is 20q13.31, with genomic coordinates of 20: 56411548-56459340 on the forward strand in GRChB38p2. While its HGNC-approved symbol is CASS4, this gene has multiple synonyms, including "HEF-like protein", "HEF1-Efs-p130Cas-like", HEFL, HEPL and C20orf32 ("chromosome 20 open reading frame 32"). Official IDs assigned to this gene include 15878 (HGNC), 57091 (Entrez Gene) and ENSG00000087589 (Ensembl). In humans four transcript variants are known. The first and second each contain 7 exons and encode the same full-length protein isoform a (786 amino acids, considered the major isoform), the third one contains 6 exons and encodes a shorter isoform b (732 amino acids) and the fourth one contains 5 exons and encodes the shortest isoform c (349 amino acids). Cumulatively, the CASS4 transcripts are most highly expressed in spleen and lung among normal tissues, and are highly expressed in ovarian and leukemia cell lines.

To date, little effort has been applied to the direct study of transcriptional regulation of CASS4. The SABiosciences' DECODE database, based on the UCSC Bioinformatics Genome Browser, proposes several transcriptional regulators for CASS4 based on its promoter region sequence: NF-κβ, p53, LCR-F1 (NFE2-L1, nuclear factor, erythroid 2-like1), MAX1, C/EBPα, CHOP-10 (C/EBP homologous protein 10), POU3F1 (POU domain, class 3, transcription factor 1, aka Oct-6), Areb6 (ZEB1, Zinc finger E-box binding homeobox 1). These are compatible with regulation relevant to lymphocytes and deregulation in cancer.

== Protein family ==
In vertebrates, the CAS protein family contains four members: p130Cas/BCAR1, NEDD9/HEF1, EFS and CASS4. There are no paralogous genes for this family in acoelomates, pseudocoelomates, and nematodes, while a single ancestral member is found in Drosophila. Evolutionary divergence of the CAS proteins family members is discussed by Singh et al. in detail.

== Structure ==
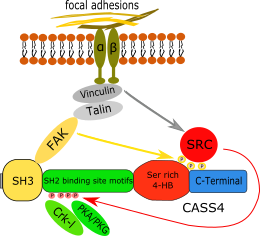
Figure 1. Interaction network and domain structure scheme of Cass4. SH3 domain (SH3) preceded by a short region with no defined functional elements; SH2-binding site motifs, which when tyrosine-phosphorylated allow interaction with SH2-domain containing proteins; serine-rich region encompassing 4-helices and a second highly conserved four-helix bundle that has been recognized as functionally and structurally similar to a focal adhesion targeting [FAT] domain..

All CAS protein family members have common structural characteristics. CAS proteins have an amino terminal SH3 domain enabling interaction with poly-proline motif-containing proteins such as FAK. Carboxy-terminal to this, they possess an unstructured domain containing multiple SH2 binding site motifs, which when tyrosine-phosphorylated allow interaction with SH2 domain containing proteins. Further to the carboxy-terminus, they have a four-helix bundle rich in serine residues, and a second highly conserved four-helix bundle that has been recognized as functionally and structurally similar to a focal adhesion targeting [FAT] domain. For the better studied members of the CAS family (BCAR1 and NEDD9), all of these domains have been defined as crucial for recognition and binding by other proteins, reflecting the primary role of CAS family proteins as cell signaling cascades mediators.

Isoform "a" of human CASS4 is considered the predominant species, and at 786 amino acids is the longest one. Amino acid sequence homology of this isoform of human CASS4 with other family members is 26% overall identity and 42% similarity. Using a yeast two-hybrid approach, the CASS4 protein SH3 domain was shown to interact with the FAK C-terminus, despite the lowest overall similarity to other SH3 domains in the CAS group. In addition, human CASS4 has a limited number of candidate SH2-binding sites, estimated at 10, which is similar to EFS (estimated at 9) and in contrast to p130Cas/BCAR1 and NEDD9, which have 20 and 18 respectively. The CASS4 C-terminus has a short region of CAS family homology, but lacks obvious similarity at the level of primary amino acid sequence. It also lacks a YDYVHL sequence at the N-terminal end of the FAT-like carboxy-terminal domain, even though this motif is conserved among the other three CAS family proteins and is an important binding site for the Src SH2 domain. Although this lack of sequence similarity may mean a reduced functionality of the CASS4 protein, molecular modeling analysis performed by Singh and colleagues using p130CAS/BCAR1 structures as templates suggested an almost identical fold between CASS4 and p130CAS/BCAR1 within their SH3 domains, and substantial similarity within 432-591 residues of CASS4 and 449-610 residues of p130Cas/BCAR1 at the level of secondary and tertiary structures. Also, the similar periodicity of α-helices and β-sheets in both CASS4 and p130Cas/BCAR1 provides another confirmation for the idea of well-conserved structures within the family members.

== Function ==
The exact function of CASS4 and its role in development and human pathologies have been subject to little investigation compared to other family members. The primary study exploring CASS4 function was the initial report by Singh et al., who showed the direct interaction between CASS4 and FAK, and CASS4 regulation of FAK activation, affecting cellular adhesion, migration and motility. Unusually, CASS4 depletion had a bimodal affect, causing some cells to have lower velocity and others to have higher velocity than control cells, suggesting a potential role in maintaining homeostasis. This work also suggested the function of CASS4 may be cell-type specific and dependent upon the presence or absence of expression of other CAS family members. Direct binding has also been identified between CASS4 and CRKL, an SH2- and SH3 domain-containing adaptor protein that has been also shown to interact with another CAS family member, p130Cas/BCAR1, in regulation of cellular motility and migration. Because of the high degree of homology in interaction domains and some identified common partners, CASS4 is likely to share some functions with other CAS family members. These include association with FAK and Src family kinases at focal adhesions to transmit integrin-initiated signals to downstream effectors, which results in cytoskeleton reorganization and changes in motility and invasion.

== Disease association ==
Altered expression or modification of CASS4 has been proposed as relevant to several human pathologies, typically based on detection of changes in CASS4 in high throughput screening, although the role of CASS4 in the pathology of these conditions has not yet been studied directly. These findings are summarized in Table 1; some examples are provided below.

Table 1. CASS4 disease association
Screen purpose	Observation
Alzheimer's disease	SNP rs7274581 T/C linked to risk. Odds ratio 0.72; p-value 0.011.
Alzheimer's disease	SNP rs7274581 T/C linked to risk. Odds ratio 0.88; p-value 2.5*10^{−8}.
Alzheimer's disease	SNP rs7274581 T/C linked to risk Odds ratio 0.8888; p-value 1.75 ×10^{−7}.
Alzheimer's disease	SNP rs6024870, RegulomeDB score 2b, which means that this SNP is likely to affect transcription factor binding.
Alzheimer's disease	SNP rs16979934 T/G linked to risk. Odds ratio 0.5956; p-value 0.03.
Atopic asthma	Upregulated in eosinophils post antigen exposure.
Cystic fibrosis	Possible correlation with severity of the lung manifestation of the disease (according to GWAS).
Non-small cell lung cancer	Overexpression is associated with lymph node metastasis, high TNM stage and poor prognosis.
Phosphoproteome of resting human platelets	Identified S305 phosphorylation by PKA/PKG in the unstructured region containing SH2-binding sites of CASS4.
Platelet activation by oxidized phospholipids	CASS4 S249 phosphorylation in the unstructured region containing SH2-binding sites is induced by oxidized phospholipid KODA-PC in platelets.

=== Cancer ===
Many CAS family proteins have altered activity and functional roles in cancer progression and metastasis, with functional roles in influencing cellular adhesion, migration and drug resistance. Changes in CASS4 may also be associated with human malignancies. CASS4 function was linked to non-small cell lung cancer (NSCLC) in a study by Miao et al. that correlated elevated CASS4 expression with lymph node metastasis and high TNM stage. In addition, this study detected a significant difference in cytoplasmic accumulation of CASS4 protein between high (H1299 and BE1) and low (LTE and A549) metastatic potential lung cancer cell lines. These may suggest CASS4 as a possible prognostic marker in clinical management of NSCLC.

=== Alzheimer's disease ===
CASS4 and corresponding SNP - rs7274581 T/C has been identified in a large meta-analysis as a locus for lower susceptibility to Alzheimer's disease (AD). However this SNP was not found predictive in a follow-up study.

In a genome wide association screen (GWAS), CASS4 showed a significant correlation with clinical pathological features of AD such as neurofibrillary tangles and neuritic plaques. Two additional CASS4 SNPs were reported to be associated with AD susceptibility: rs6024870, and rs16979934 T/G. Given the likely conserved CAS-family cytoskeletal function of CASS4, it has been speculated that it may have a role in axonal transport and influence the expression of the amyloid precursor protein (APP) and tau, which are pathologically affected in AD. Several possible mechanisms for CASS4 action in AD have been proposed.

=== Immunopathological conditions ===
An association of CASS4 with atopic asthma has been shown. CASS4 has also been reported to be an eosinophil-associated gene, with expression in sputum cells increased more than 1.5-fold after whole lung allergen challenge. Moreover, the CASS4 mRNA was upregulated in cells collected by bronchoalveolar lavage after segmental broncho-provocation with an allergen. Reciprocally, the CASS4 mRNA was downregulated when this procedure was performed following administration of mepolizumab (a humanized monoclonal anti-IL-5 antibodies which reduces excessive eosinophilia). This suggests CASS4 activity may be associated with immune response in the context of atopic asthma development.

==== Cystic fibrosis ====
CASS4 has been reported to play a modifying role in cystic fibrosis severity, progression and comorbid conditions. The CAS family member NEDD9 has also been shown to interact directly with AURKA (encoding Aurora-A kinase) to regulate cell cycle and ciliary resorption; it is possible that CASS4 may similarly interact with aurora-A kinase.

=== Thrombosis ===
CASS4 signaling may contribute to platelet activation and aggregation. A PKA/PKG phosphorylation site has been identified in CASS4 on residue S305 in the unstructured domain containing SH2-binding motifs; the functional significance of this phosphorylation is currently unknown. Significantly increased phosphorylation on S249 of CASS4, also in the unstructured domain, after platelet stimulation with the oxidized phospholipid KODA-PC (9-keto-12-oxo-10-dodecenoic acid ester of 2-lyso-phosphocholine, a CD36 receptor agonist) versus thrombin treatment, which may implicate CASS4 mediated signaling in platelet hyperreactivity.

== Clinical significance ==
There are currently no therapeutic approaches targeting CASS4, and in the absence of a catalytic domain and no extracellular moieties, it may be challenging to generate such an agent. However, CASS4 may ultimately be relevant in clinical practice as a possible marker to assess prognosis and outcome in cases of NSCLC (and possibly other types of cancer). At present, its greatest clinical value is likely to be as a predictive variant for severity and onset of Alzheimer's disease and cystic fibrosis.
