= A431 =

A431 may refer to:

- A431 road, a road between Bath and Bristol in England
- A431 cells, an experimental cell line used in biomedical research
