= GAB2 =

Protein-coding gene in the species Homo sapiens

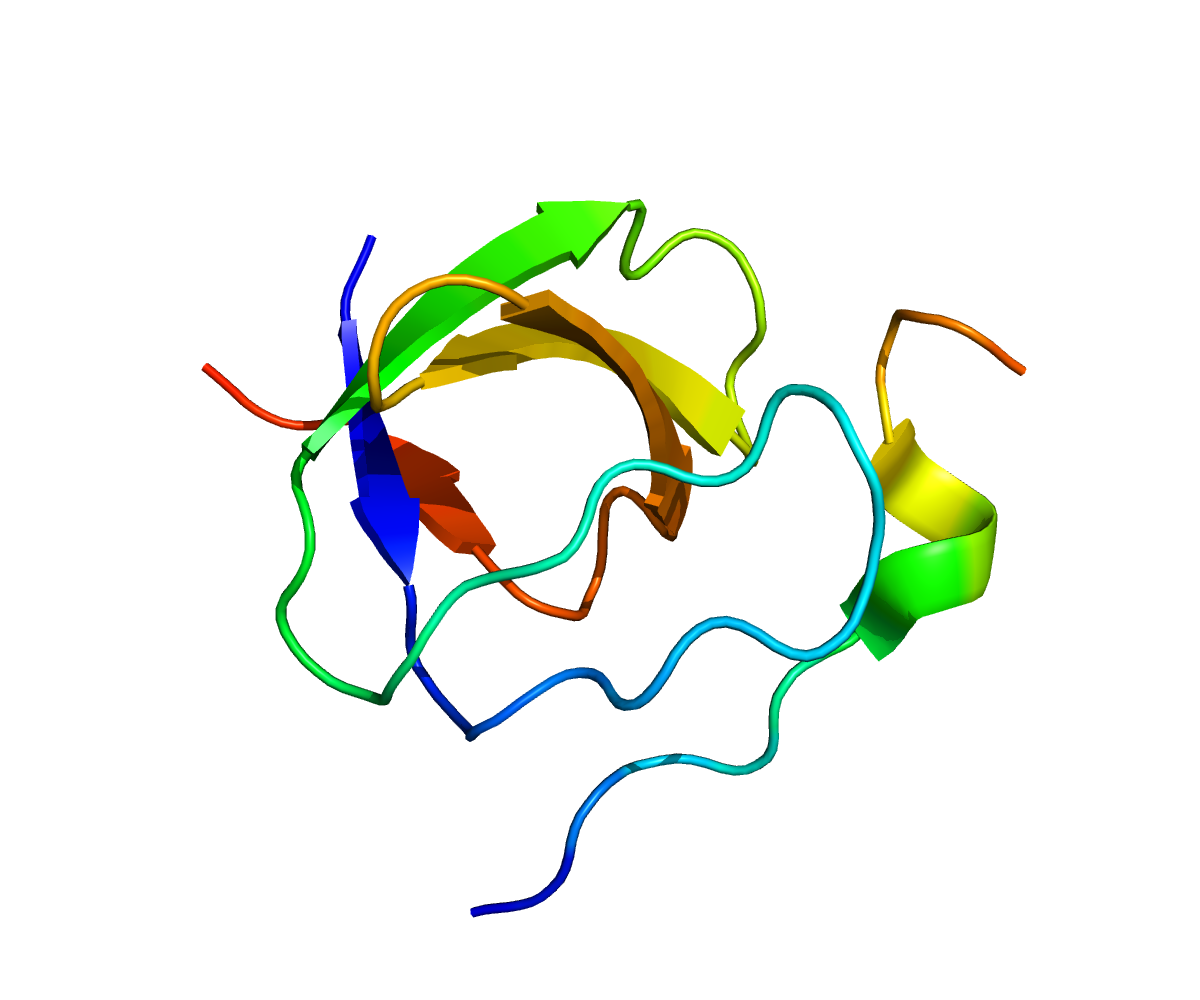

Identifiers
- Aliases: GAB2, entrez:9846, GRB2 associated binding protein 2
- External IDs: OMIM: 606203; MGI: 1333854; GeneCards: GAB2
Available structures
PDB	Ortholog search: PDBe RCSB
PDB	List of PDB id codes 2VWF, 2W0Z, 5EXA, 5EWZ

Gene location (Human)
Chr.	Chromosome 11 (human)
Band	11q14.1	Start	78,215,293 bp
Band	11q14.1	End	78,418,348 bp

Gene location (Mouse)
Chr.	Chromosome 7 (mouse)
Band	7|7 E1	Start	96,730,793 bp
Band	7|7 E1	End	96,958,153 bp
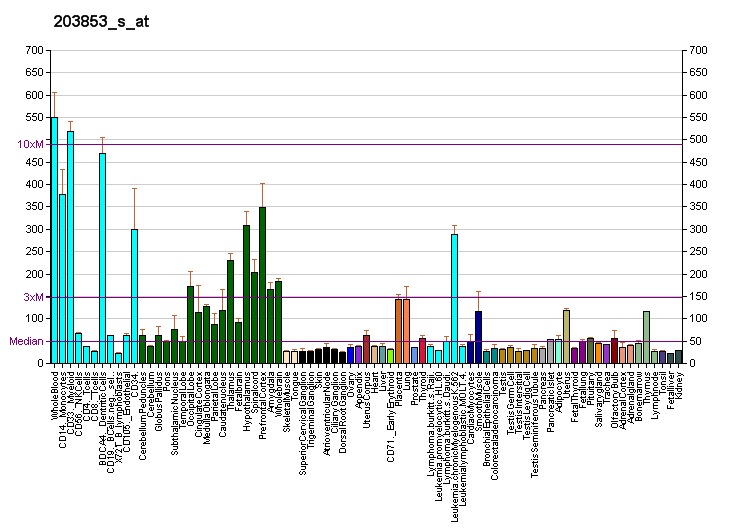
RNA expression pattern
Bgee	Human / Mouse (ortholog); Top expressed in: inferior ganglion of vagus nerve; subthalamic nucleus; medulla oblongata; superior vestibular nucleus; corpus callosum; external globus pallidus; ventral tegmental area; spinal cord; C1 segment; pars compacta / Top expressed in: ascending aorta; aortic valve; retinal pigment epithelium; substantia nigra; decidua; ciliary body; renal corpuscle; facial motor nucleus; stroma of bone marrow; sexually immature organism; More reference expression data
BioGPS	More reference expression data
Gene ontology
Molecular function	phosphatidylinositol-3,4,5-trisphosphate binding; transmembrane receptor protein tyrosine kinase adaptor activity; phosphatidylinositol-3,4-bisphosphate binding; protein binding; 1-phosphatidylinositol-3-kinase activity
Cellular component	cytosol; plasma membrane; membrane; cytoplasm
Biological process	positive regulation of mast cell degranulation; osteoclast differentiation; phosphatidylinositol-mediated signaling; positive regulation of cell population proliferation; Fc-epsilon receptor signaling pathway; transmembrane receptor protein tyrosine kinase signaling pathway; axon guidance; cytokine-mediated signaling pathway; phosphatidylinositol-3-phosphate biosynthetic process
Sources:Amigo / QuickGO
Orthologs
Databases	NCBI: entry; OMA: entry
Species	Human	Mouse
Entrez	9846	14389
Ensembl	ENSG00000033327	ENSMUSG00000004508
UniProt	Q9UQC2	Q9Z1S8
RefSeq (mRNA)	NM_012296; NM_080491	NM_001162477; NM_010248
RefSeq (protein)	NP_036428; NP_536739	n/a
Location (UCSC)	Chr 11: 78.22 – 78.42 Mb	Chr 7: 96.73 – 96.96 Mb
PubMed search
- Wikidata
View/Edit Human	View/Edit Mouse

GRB2-associated-binding protein 2 also known as GAB2 is a protein that in humans is encoded by the GAB2 gene.

GAB2 is a docking protein with a conserved, folded PH domain attached to the membrane and a large disordered region, which hosts interactions with signaling molecules. It is a member of the GAB/DOS family localized on the internal membrane of the cell. It mediates the interaction between receptor tyrosine kinases (RTKs) and non-RTK receptors serving as the gateway into the cell for activation of SHP2, Phosphatidylinositol 3-kinase (PI3K), Grb2, ERK, and AKT and acting as one of the first steps in these signaling pathways. GAB2 has been shown to be important in physiological functions such as growth in bone marrow and cardiac function. GAB2 has also been associated with many diseases including leukemia and Alzheimer's disease.

== Discovery ==
GAB proteins were one of the first docking proteins identified in the mammalian signal transduction pathway. GAB2 along with many other adaptor, scaffold, and docking proteins, was discovered in the mid-1990s during the isolation and cloning of protein tyrosine kinase substrates and association partners. GAB2 was initially discovered as a binding protein and substrate of protein tyrosine phosphatase Shp2/PTPN11. Two other groups later cloned GAB2 by searching DNA database for protein with sequence homology to GAB1.

== Structure ==
GAB2 is a large multi-site docking protein (LMD) of about 100kD that has a folded N-terminal domain attached to an extended, disordered C-terminal tail rich in short linear motifs. LMDs are docking proteins that function as platforms mediating interaction between different signaling pathways and assisting with signal integration. The N-terminal is characterized by a Pleckstrin Homology (PH) domain that is the most highly conserved region between all members of the GAB family of proteins. (GAB1, GAB2, GAB3 and GAB4) GAB2 is an Intrinsically disordered protein, meaning that beyond the folded N-terminal region, the C-terminal region extends out into the cytoplasm with little or no secondary structure. The disordered region of the protein however may not be as disordered as was initially expected, as sequencing has revealed significant similarity between the "disordered" regions of GAB orthologs in different species.

The PH domain of GAB2 recognizes phosphatidylinositol 3,4,5-triphosphate(PIP3) in the membrane and is responsible for localizing the GAB protein on the intracellular surface of the membrane and in regions where the cell contacts another cell. Some evidence also suggests that the PH domain plays a role in some signal regulation as well.

Adjacent to the PH domain is a central, proline-rich domain that contains many PXXP motifs for binding to the SH3 domains of signaling molecules such as Grb2 (from which the name "Grb2-associated binding" protein, GAB, comes). It is hypothesized that binding sites in this region may be used in indirect mechanisms pairing the GAB2 protein to receptor tyrosine kinases. It is on the C-terminal tail that the various conserved protein binding motifs and phosphorylation sites of GAB2 are found. GAB2 binds to the SH2 domains of such signaling molecules as SHP2 and PI3K. By binding to the p85 subunit of PI3K, and continuing this signaling pathway GAB provides positive feedback for the creation of PIP3, produced as a result of the PI3K pathway, which binds to GAB2 in the membrane and promotes activation of more PI3Ks. Discovery of multiple binding sites in GAB proteins has led to the N-terminal folding nucleation (NFN) hypothesis for the structure of the disordered region. This theory suggests that the disordered domain is looped back to connect to the N-terminal, structured region several times to make the protein more compact. This would assist in promoting interactions between molecules bound to GAB and resisting degradation.

== Function ==
GAB2 mediates the interactions between receptor tyrosine kinases (RTK) or non-RTK receptors, such as G protein coupled receptors, cytokine receptors, multichain immune recognition receptors and integrins, and the molecules of the intracellular signaling pathways. By providing a platform to host a wide array of interactions from extracellular inputs to intracellular pathways, GAB proteins can act as a gatekeeper to the cell, modulating and integrating signals as they pass them along, to control the functional state within the cell.

Mutagenesis and Binding assays have helped to identify which molecules and what pathways are downstream of GAB2. The two main pathways of GAB proteins are SHP2 and PI3K. GAB protein binding to SHP2 molecules acts as an activator whose main effect is the activation of the ERK/MAPK pathway. There are also, however, other pathways that are activated by this interaction such as the pathways c-Kit-induced Rac activation and β1-integrin. PI3K activation by GAB2 promotes cell growth. The effects of all the pathways activated by GAB proteins are not known, but it is easy to see that amplification of signal can progress quickly and these proteins can have large effects on the state of the cell. While not lethal, GAB2 deficient knockout mice do exhibit phenotypic side-effects. These include weak allergic reactions, reduced mast cell growth in bone marrow and osteopetrosis. Knockout mice have also been used to show the importance of GAB2 in maintenance of cardiac function. A paracrine factor, NRG1 β, utilizes GAB2 to activate the ERK and AKT pathways in the heart to produce angiopoietin 1.

== Interactions ==
The C-terminal tail of GAB2 acts as a site for multiple phosphorylation of tyrosine kinases. It acts as a docking station for the Src homology 2(SH2) domain that is contained in the adaptor protein families Crk, Grb2, and Nck. These adaptor proteins then couple to enzymes to amplify different cellular signals. GAB2 may also bind directly to SH2-containing enzymes, such as PI3K, to produce such signals.

GAB2 has been shown to interact with:

=== AKT1 ===
Through the PI3K signaling pathway, PI3K activates the serine/threonine protein kinase (AKT), which in turn through phosphorylation inactivates GSK3. This in turn causes the phosphorylation of tau and amyloid production.

=== CRKL ===
CT10 regulator of kinase (Crk) is also known as the breast cancer anti-oestrogen resistance protein. It plays a role in both fibroblast formation and breast cancer. The YXXP binding motif is required for the association of CRKL and GAB2. This leads to the activation of c-Jun N-terminal kinase(JNK) as part of the JNK signaling pathway.

=== Grb2 ===
Upon stimulation by growth hormone, insulin, epidermal growth factor (EFG), etc., the GAB2 protein can be recruited from the cytoplasm to the cell membrane, where it forms a complex with Grb2 and SHC. The interaction between GAB2 and Grb2 requires a PX3RX2KP motif in order to produce a regulatory signal. The activated GAB2 can now recruit SH2 domain-containing molecules, such as SHP2 or PI3K to activate signaling pathways.

=== PI3K ===
The p85 subunit of PI3K (or PIK3) possessed the SH2 domain required to be activated by GAB2. The activation of the PI3K signaling pathway produces increased amyloid production and microglia-mediated inflammation. The immunoglobulin receptor FceRI requires GAB2 as a necessity for mast cells to activate PI3K receptor to create an allergic response. In a study of knockout mice lacking the GAB2 gene, subjects experienced impaired allergic reactions, including passive cutaneous and systemic anaphylaxis. PI3K is found to be mutated in most breast cancer subtypes. Sufficient GAB2 expression by these cancerous subtypes proves necessary in order to sustain a cancerous phenotype.

=== PLCG2 ===
The erythropoietin hormone (Epo) is responsible for the regulation and proliferation of erythrocytes. Epo is able to self phosphorylate, which causes recruitment of SH2 proteins. An activated complex of GAB2, SHC, and SHP2 is required for binding of Phospholipase C gamma 2 (PLCG2) through its SH2 domain, which activates PIP3.

=== PTPN11 ===
Protein tyrosine phosphatase non-receptor 11 (PTPN11) interaction with GAB2 is part of the Ras pathway. Mutations found in PTPN11 cause disruption in the binding to GAB2, which in turn impairs correct cellular growth. Thirty-five percent of patients diagnosed with JMML show activating mutations in PTPN11.

=== RICS ===
GC-GAP is part of the Rho GTP-ase activating protein family (RICS). It contains a highly proline-rich motifs that allow favorable interactions with GAB2. GC-GAP is responsible for the proliferation of astroglioma cells.

=== SHC1 ===
The interaction between GAB2 and Grb2 at the cell membrane recruits another adaptor protein, the Src homology domain-containing transforming protein 1 (SHC1), before being able to recruit SH2 domain-containing molecules.

== Clinical Implications ==
=== Alzheimer's disease ===
Ten SNPs of GAB2 have been associated with late-onset Alzheimer's disease (LOAD). However, this association is found only in APOE ε4 carriers. In LOAD brains, GAB2 is overexpressed in neurons, tangle-bearing neurons, and dystrophic neuritis.

GAB2 has been indicated in playing a role in the pathogenesis of Alzheimer's disease via its interaction with tau and amyloid precursor proteins. GAB2 may prevent neuronal tangle formation characteristic of LOAD by reducing phosphorylation of tau protein via the activation of the PI3K signaling pathway, which activates Akt. Akt inactivates Gsk3, which is responsible for tau phosphorylation. Mutations in GAB2 could affect Gsk3-dependent phosphorylation of tau and the formation of neurofibrillary tangles. Interactions between GAB2-Grb2 and APP are enhanced in AD brains, suggesting an involvement of this coupling in the neuropathogenesis of AD.

=== Cancer ===
GAB2 has been linked to the oncogenesis of many cancers including colon, gastric, breast, and ovarian cancer. Studies suggest that GAB2 is used to amplify the signal of many RTKs implicated in breast cancer development and progression.

GAB2 has been particularly characterized for its role in leukemia. In chronic myelogenous leukemia (CML), GAB2 interacts with the Bcr-Abl complex and is instrumental in maintaining the oncogenic properties of the complex. The Grb2/GAB2 complex is recruited to phosphorylated Y177 of the Bcr-Abl complex leading to Bcr-Abl-mediated transformation and leukemogenesis. GAB2 also plays a role in juvenile myelomonocytic leukemia (JMML). Studies have shown the protein's involvement in the disease via the Ras pathway. In addition, GAB2 appears to play an important role in PTPN11 mutations associated with JMML.
