= PTPN1 =

Protein-coding gene in the species Homo sapiens

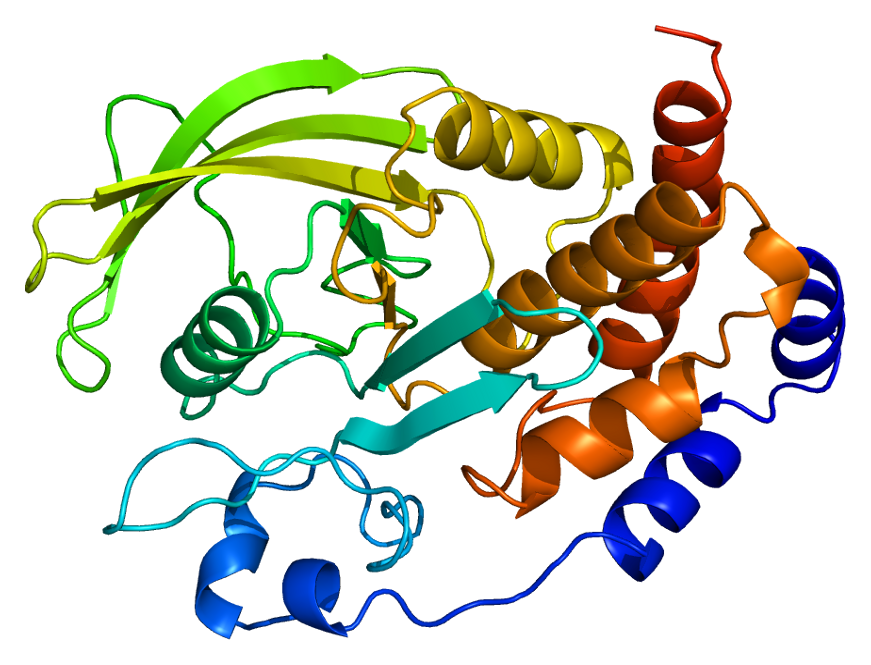

Identifiers
- Aliases: PTPN1, PTP1B, protein tyrosine phosphatase, non-receptor type 1, protein tyrosine phosphatase non-receptor type 1
- External IDs: OMIM: 176885; MGI: 97805; GeneCards: PTPN1
Available structures
PDB	Ortholog search: PDBe RCSB
PDB	List of PDB id codes 1A5Y, 1AAX, 1BZC, 1BZH, 1BZJ, 1C83, 1C84, 1C85, 1C86, 1C87, 1C88, 1ECV, 1EEN, 1EEO, 1G1F, 1G1G, 1G1H, 1G7F, 1G7G, 1GFY, 1I57, 1JF7, 1KAK, 1KAV, 1L8G, 1LQF, 1NL9, 1NNY, 1NO6, 1NWE, 1NWL, 1NZ7, 1OEM, 1OEO, 1OES, 1OET, 1OEV, 1ONY, 1ONZ, 1PA1, 1PH0, 1PTT, 1PTU, 1PTV, 1PTY, 1PXH, 1PYN, 1Q1M, 1Q6J, 1Q6M, 1Q6N, 1Q6P, 1Q6S, 1Q6T, 1QXK, 1SUG, 1T48, 1T49, 1T4J, 1WAX, 1XBO, 2AZR, 2B07, 2B4S, 2BGD, 2BGE, 2CM2, 2CM3, 2CM7, 2CM8, 2CMA, 2CMB, 2CMC, 2CNE, 2CNF, 2CNG, 2CNH, 2CNI, 2F6F, 2F6T, 2F6V, 2F6W, 2F6Y, 2F6Z, 2F70, 2F71, 2FJM, 2FJN, 2H4G, 2H4K, 2HB1, 2HNP, 2HNQ, 2NT7, 2NTA, 2QBP, 2QBQ, 2QBR, 2QBS, 2VEU, 2VEV, 2VEW, 2VEX, 2VEY, 2ZMM, 2ZN7, 3A5J, 3A5K, 3CWE, 3D9C, 3EAX, 3EB1, 3EU0, 3I7Z, 3I80, 3QKP, 3QKQ, 3SME, 3ZMP, 3ZMQ, 3ZV2, 4BJO, 4I8N, 4QAH, 4QAP, 4QBE, 4QBW, 4Y14, 4ZRT
Enzyme activity
EC #	BRENDA	ExPASy	KEGG	MetaCyc
3.1.3.48	↗	↗	↗	↗

Gene location (Human)
Chr.	Chromosome 20 (human)
Band	20q13.13	Start	50,510,321 bp
Band	20q13.13	End	50,585,241 bp

Gene location (Mouse)
Chr.	Chromosome 2 (mouse)
Band	2|2 H3	Start	167,773,977 bp
Band	2|2 H3	End	167,821,305 bp
RNA expression pattern
Bgee	Human / Mouse (ortholog); Top expressed in: upper lobe of left lung; right lung; spleen; appendix; monocyte; lymph node; granulocyte; tibial arteries; ascending aorta; left adrenal gland / Top expressed in: tibiofemoral joint; corneal stroma; Rostral migratory stream; granulocyte; mesenteric lymph nodes; stroma of bone marrow; spleen; Ileal epithelium; decidua; lactiferous gland; More reference expression data
BioGPS	n/a
Gene ontology
Molecular function	phosphoprotein phosphatase activity; insulin receptor binding; phosphatase activity; ephrin receptor binding; receptor tyrosine kinase binding; zinc ion binding; protein binding; protein tyrosine phosphatase activity; protein phosphatase 2A binding; enzyme binding; hydrolase activity; protein kinase binding; RNA binding; cadherin binding
Cellular component	cytoplasm; cytosol; endoplasmic reticulum membrane; membrane; plasma membrane; early endosome; endoplasmic reticulum; cytoplasmic side of endoplasmic reticulum membrane; sorting endosome; cytoplasmic vesicle; protein-containing complex
Biological process	regulation of endocytosis; actin cytoskeleton reorganization; insulin receptor signaling pathway; negative regulation of endoplasmic reticulum stress-induced intrinsic apoptotic signaling pathway; growth hormone receptor signaling pathway via JAK-STAT; peptidyl-tyrosine dephosphorylation involved in inactivation of protein kinase activity; negative regulation of vascular endothelial growth factor receptor signaling pathway; positive regulation of protein tyrosine kinase activity; protein dephosphorylation; regulation of hepatocyte growth factor receptor signaling pathway; response to endoplasmic reticulum stress; endoplasmic reticulum unfolded protein response; regulation of intracellular protein transport; positive regulation of IRE1-mediated unfolded protein response; negative regulation of insulin receptor signaling pathway; IRE1-mediated unfolded protein response; regulation of type I interferon-mediated signaling pathway; regulation of signal transduction; negative regulation of MAP kinase activity; positive regulation of receptor catabolic process; negative regulation of ERK1 and ERK2 cascade; peptidyl-tyrosine dephosphorylation; negative regulation of PERK-mediated unfolded protein response; regulation of insulin receptor signaling pathway; platelet-derived growth factor receptor-beta signaling pathway; dephosphorylation; negative regulation of signal transduction; Unfolded protein response
Sources:Amigo / QuickGO
Orthologs
Databases	NCBI: entry; OMA: entry
Species	Human	Mouse
Entrez	5770	19246
Ensembl	ENSG00000196396	ENSMUSG00000027540
UniProt	P18031	P35821
RefSeq (mRNA)	NM_002827; NM_001278618	NM_011201
RefSeq (protein)	NP_001265547; NP_002818	NP_035331
Location (UCSC)	Chr 20: 50.51 – 50.59 Mb	Chr 2: 167.77 – 167.82 Mb
PubMed search
- Wikidata
View/Edit Human	View/Edit Mouse

Tyrosine-protein phosphatase non-receptor type 1 also known as protein-tyrosine phosphatase 1B (PTP1B) is an enzyme that is the founding member of the protein tyrosine phosphatase (PTP) family. In humans it is encoded by the PTPN1 gene. PTP1B is a negative regulator of the insulin signaling pathway and is considered a promising potential therapeutic target, in particular for treatment of type 2 diabetes. It has also been implicated in the development of breast cancer and has been explored as a potential therapeutic target in that avenue as well.

== Structure and function ==
PTP1B was first isolated from a human placental protein extract, but it is expressed in many tissues. PTP1B is localized to the cytoplasmic face of the endoplasmic reticulum. PTP1B can dephosphorylate the phosphotyrosine residues of the activated insulin receptor kinase. In mice, genetic ablation of PTPN1 results in enhanced insulin sensitivity. Several other tyrosine kinases, including epidermal growth factor receptor, insulin-like growth factor 1 receptor, colony stimulating factor 1 receptor, c-Src, Janus kinase 2, TYK2, and focal adhesion kinase as well as other tyrosine-phosphorylated proteins, including BCAR1, DOK1, beta-catenin and cortactin have also been described as PTP1B substrates.

The first crystal structure of the PTP1B catalytic domain revealed that the catalytic site exists within a deep cleft of the protein formed by three loops including the WPD loop with the Asp181 residue, a pTyr loop with the Tyr46 residue and a Q loop with the Gln262 residue. The pTyr loop and Tyr46 residue are located on the surface of the protein, and thus help to determine the depth a substrate can obtain within the cleft. This acts as a means of driving selectivity, as substrates containing smaller phosphoresidues cannot reach the site of catalytic activity at the base of the cleft. Upon substrate binding, PTP1B undergoes a structural modification in which the WPD loop closes around the substrate, introducing stabilizing pi stacking interactions between the aromatic rings of the phosphotyrosine (pTyr) substrate residue and the Phe182 residue on the WPD loop.

== Mechanism ==
The phosphatase activity of PTP1B occurs via a two-step mechanism. The dephosphorylation of the pTyr substrate occurs in the first step, while the enzyme intermediates are broken down during the second step. During the first step, there is a nucleophilic attack at the phosphocenter by the reduced Cys215 residue, followed by subsequent protonation by Asp181 to yield the neutral tyrosine phenol. The active enzyme is regenerated after the thiophosphate intermediate is hydrolyzed, which is facilitated by the hydrogen bonding interactions of Gln262 and Asp181 that help to position in the water molecule at the desired site of nucleophillic attack.

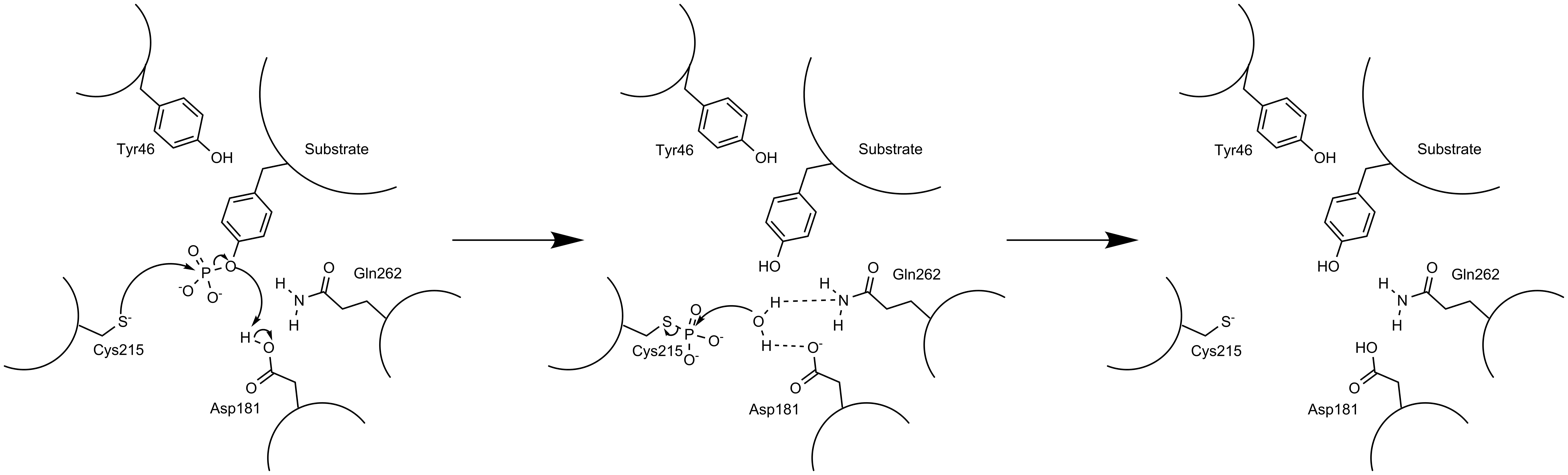
Two step mechanism of PTP1B phosphatase activity.

== Regulation ==
The Cys215 residue is essential for the enzymatic activity of PTP1B and similar cysteine residues are required for the activity of other members of the Class I PTP family. The thiolate anion form is needed for nucleophilic activity but it is susceptible to oxidation by reactive oxygen species (ROS) in the cell which would render the enzyme non-functional. This cysteine residue has been shown to oxidize under increased cellular concentrations of hydrogen peroxide (H_{2}O_{2}), produced in response to EGF and insulin signaling. The thiolate is oxidized to a sulfenic acid, which is converted to a sulfenyl amide after reacting with the adjacent Ser216 residue. This modification of the Cys215 residue prevents further oxidation of the residue which would be irreversible, and also induces a structural change in the cleft of the active site such that substrates may not bind. This oxidation can be reversed through reduction by glutathione and acts as a means of regulating PTP1B activity. Phosphorylation of the Ser50 residue has also been shown as a point of allosteric regulation of PTP1B, in which the phosphorylated state of the enzyme is inactive.

== Interactions ==
PTPN1 has been shown to interact with BCAR1, epidermal growth factor receptor, Grb2 and IRS1. Vascular endothelial growth factor Receptor-2 and Vascular endothelial growth factor via PGC1-alpha/ERR-alpha

== Clinical significance ==
PTP1B has clinical implications in the treatment of type 2 diabetes as well as cancer. Gene knockout studies conducted in murine models has provided substantial evidence for the role PTP1B plays in the regulation of insulin signalling and the development of obesity. PTPN1 knockout mice kept on high fat diets showed a resistance to obesity and an increased degree of insulin sensitivity as compared to their wild-type counterparts. As such, the design and development of PTP1B inhibitors is a growing field of research for the treatment of type 2 diabetes and obesity.

Although PTP1B is generally studied as a regulator of metabolism, some research suggest it may have a role in tumor development, though whether it is oncogenic or tumor suppressive is unclear, as there is data in support of both arguments. The high ROS concentrations within cancer cells provide an environment for potential constitutive inactivation of PTP1B and it has been shown in two human cancer cell lines HepG2 and A431, that up to 40% of the Cys215 residues in PTP1B can be selectively irreversibly oxidized under these cellular conditions resulting in non-functional PTP1B. In addition, PTPN1 genetic ablation in p53 deficient mice resulted in an increased incidence of lymphomas and a decrease in overall survival rates. In contrast, the PTPN1 gene has been shown to be overexpressed in conjunction with HER2 in breast cancer cases. Murine models of HER2 overexpression in conjunction with PTPN1 knockout resulted in delayed tumor growth and with fewer observed metastases to the lung suggesting that PTPN1 may have an oncogenic role in breast cancer.

== See also ==
- Protein tyrosine phosphatase
