= PTPN12 =

Protein-coding gene in the species Homo sapiens

Identifiers
- Aliases: PTPN12, PTP-PEST, PTPG1, protein tyrosine phosphatase, non-receptor type 12, protein tyrosine phosphatase non-receptor type 12
- External IDs: OMIM: 600079; MGI: 104673; GeneCards: PTPN12
Available structures
PDB	Ortholog search: PDBe RCSB
PDB	List of PDB id codes 5J8R
Enzyme activity
EC #	BRENDA	ExPASy	KEGG	MetaCyc
3.1.3.48	↗	↗	↗	↗

Gene location (Human)
Chr.	Chromosome 7 (human)
Band	7q11.23	Start	77,537,295 bp
Band	7q11.23	End	77,640,069 bp

Gene location (Mouse)
Chr.	Chromosome 5 (mouse)
Band	5|5 A3	Start	20,986,645 bp
Band	5|5 A3	End	21,055,911 bp
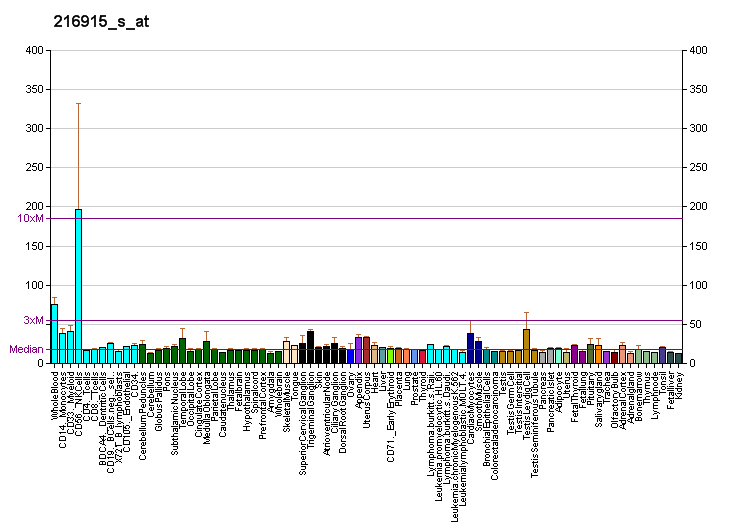

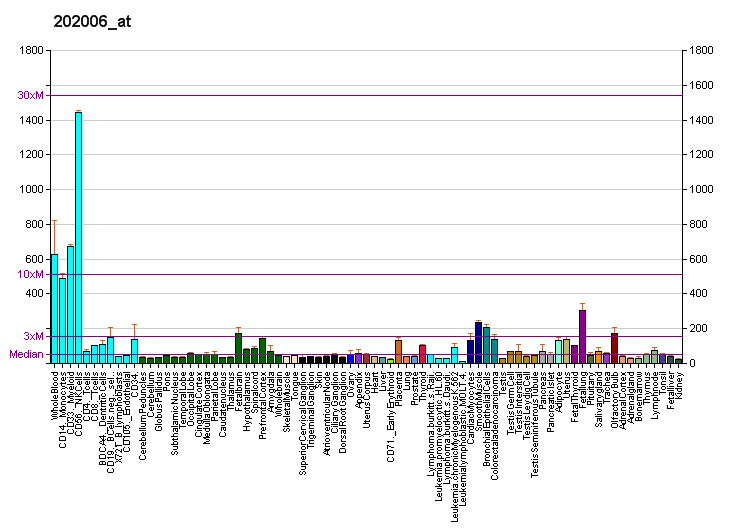
RNA expression pattern
Bgee	Human / Mouse (ortholog); Top expressed in: gonad; epithelium of colon; monocyte; right lung; tibial nerve; Achilles tendon; lower lobe of lung; upper lobe of lung; upper lobe of left lung; subcutaneous adipose tissue / Top expressed in: tail of embryo; Gonadal ridge; left lung lobe; genital tubercle; stroma of bone marrow; trigeminal ganglion; abdominal wall; otic placode; hair follicle; dermis; More reference expression data
BioGPS	More reference expression data
Gene ontology
Molecular function	SH3 domain binding; phosphatase activity; protein binding; hydrolase activity; non-membrane spanning protein tyrosine phosphatase activity; phosphoprotein phosphatase activity; protein tyrosine phosphatase activity
Cellular component	podosome; cell junction; cell projection; focal adhesion; cytoplasm; cytosol; nucleoplasm
Biological process	tissue regeneration; dephosphorylation; protein dephosphorylation; regulation of epidermal growth factor receptor signaling pathway; peptidyl-tyrosine dephosphorylation; cellular response to epidermal growth factor stimulus; ERBB2 signaling pathway; negative regulation of ERBB signaling pathway; negative regulation of platelet-derived growth factor receptor-beta signaling pathway; cellular response to cytokine stimulus
Sources:Amigo / QuickGO
Orthologs
Databases	NCBI: entry; OMA: entry
Species	Human	Mouse
Entrez	5782	19248
Ensembl	ENSG00000127947	ENSMUSG00000028771
UniProt	Q05209	P35831
RefSeq (mRNA)	NM_001131008; NM_001131009; NM_002835	NM_011203; NM_001356590; NM_001356591; NM_001356592
RefSeq (protein)	NP_001124480; NP_001124481; NP_002826	NP_035333; NP_001343519; NP_001343520; NP_001343521
Location (UCSC)	Chr 7: 77.54 – 77.64 Mb	Chr 5: 20.99 – 21.06 Mb
PubMed search
- Wikidata
View/Edit Human	View/Edit Mouse

Tyrosine-protein phosphatase non-receptor type 12 is an enzyme that in humans is encoded by the PTPN12 gene.

The protein encoded by this gene is a member of the protein tyrosine phosphatase (PTP) family. PTPs are known to be signaling molecules that regulate a variety of cellular processes including cell growth, differentiation, mitotic cycle, and oncogenic transformation. This PTP contains a C-terminal PEST motif, which serves as a protein–protein interaction domain, and may be related to protein intracellular half-life. This PTP was found to bind and dephosphorylate the product of oncogene c-ABL, thus may play a role in oncogenesis. This PTP was shown to interact with, and dephosphorylate, various of cytoskeleton and cell adhesion molecules, such as p130 (Cas), CAKbeta/PTK2B, PSTPIP1, and paxillin, which suggested its regulatory roles in controlling cell shape and mobility.

== Interactions ==
PTPN12 has been shown to interact with BCAR1, Grb2, PSTPIP1, TGFB1I1, Paxillin and SHC1.
