= RAPGEF1 =

Protein-coding gene in the species Homo sapiens

Identifiers
- Aliases: RAPGEF1, C3G, GRF2, Rap guanine nucleotide exchange factor 1
- External IDs: OMIM: 600303; MGI: 104580; GeneCards: RAPGEF1

Gene location (Human)
Chr.	Chromosome 9 (human)
Band	9q34.13	Start	131,576,770 bp
Band	9q34.13	End	131,740,076 bp

Gene location (Mouse)
Chr.	Chromosome 2 (mouse)
Band	2 B|2 20.32 cM	Start	29,509,732 bp
Band	2 B|2 20.32 cM	End	29,630,990 bp
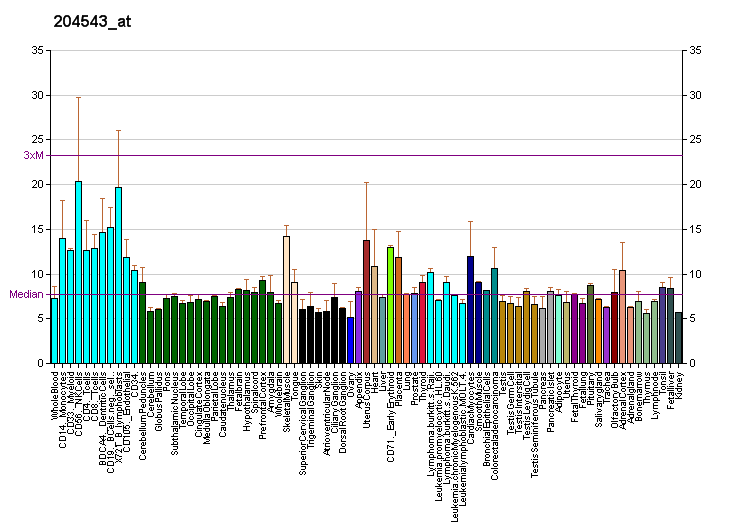
RNA expression pattern
Bgee	Human / Mouse (ortholog); Top expressed in: gastrocnemius muscle; muscle of thigh; apex of heart; sural nerve; granulocyte; nucleus accumbens; right lung; right frontal lobe; right hemisphere of cerebellum; caudate nucleus / Top expressed in: otic vesicle; saccule; muscle of thigh; otic placode; skeletal muscle tissue; ankle; knee joint; ventricular zone; dentate gyrus of hippocampal formation granule cell; gastrocnemius muscle; More reference expression data
BioGPS	More reference expression data
Gene ontology
Molecular function	SH3 domain binding; protein binding; guanyl-nucleotide exchange factor activity
Cellular component	cytosol; endosome; early endosome; phagocytic vesicle membrane; perinuclear region of cytoplasm; cytoplasm; protein-containing complex
Biological process	establishment of endothelial barrier; negative regulation of protein kinase B signaling; cellular response to nerve growth factor stimulus; regulation of cell junction assembly; transmembrane receptor protein tyrosine kinase signaling pathway; small GTPase mediated signal transduction; Rap protein signal transduction; negative regulation of neural precursor cell proliferation; nerve growth factor signaling pathway; nervous system development; negative regulation of Ras protein signal transduction; positive regulation of GTPase activity; blood vessel development; negative regulation of ERK1 and ERK2 cascade; platelet-derived growth factor receptor signaling pathway; negative regulation of canonical Wnt signaling pathway; cellular response to cAMP; signal transduction; positive regulation of neuron projection development; regulation of JNK cascade; positive regulation of ERK1 and ERK2 cascade; positive regulation of Fc-gamma receptor signaling pathway involved in phagocytosis; cell-cell adhesion; cytokine-mediated signaling pathway; positive regulation of Ras protein signal transduction; activation of GTPase activity
Sources:Amigo / QuickGO
Orthologs
Databases	NCBI: entry; OMA: entry
Species	Human	Mouse
Entrez	2889	107746
Ensembl	ENSG00000107263	ENSMUSG00000039844
UniProt	Q13905	n/a
RefSeq (mRNA)	NM_001304275; NM_005312; NM_198679; NM_001377935; NM_001377936 NM_001377937; NM_001377938	NM_001039086; NM_001039087; NM_054050; NM_001362702
RefSeq (protein)	NP_001291204; NP_005303; NP_941372; NP_001364864; NP_001364865 NP_001364866; NP_001364867	n/a
Location (UCSC)	Chr 9: 131.58 – 131.74 Mb	Chr 2: 29.51 – 29.63 Mb
PubMed search
- Wikidata
View/Edit Human	View/Edit Mouse

Rap guanine nucleotide exchange factor 1 is a protein that in humans is encoded by the RAPGEF1 gene.

== Function ==
The protein encoded by this gene is a human guanine nucleotide releasing protein for Ras protein. It belongs to the adaptor-type Src homology (SH)2-containing molecules. Src homology 2 domains are globular protein modules present in a large variety of functionally distinct proteins. They mediate binding events that control the activity and localization of many proteins involved in the transmission of signals from the cell surface to the nucleus. The mRNAs of these proteins are expressed ubiquitously in human adult and fetal tissues. Several alternatively spliced transcript variants of this gene have been described, but the full-length nature of some variants has not been determined.

== Interactions ==
RAPGEF1 has been shown to interact with:

- BCAR1,
- CRK,
- CRKL
- Grb2, and
- HCK.
