= CRKL =

Protein-coding gene in the species Homo sapiens

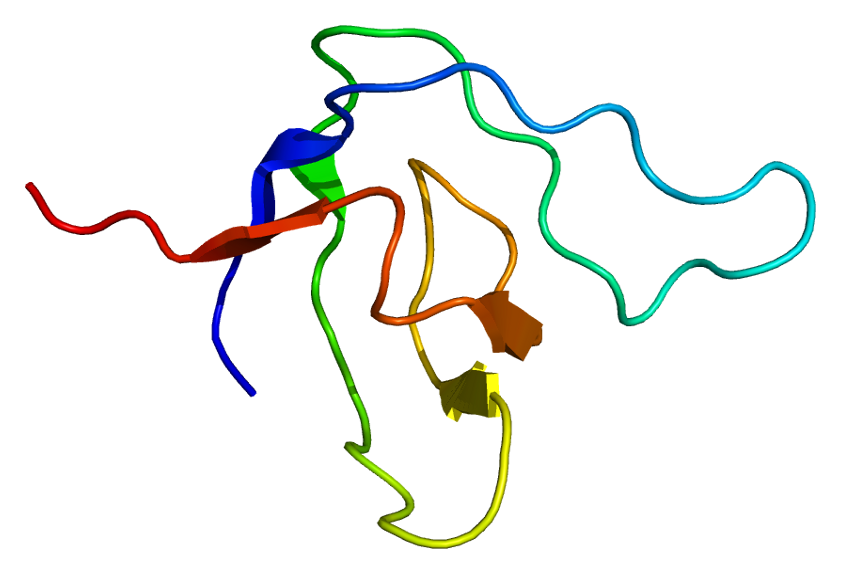

Identifiers
- Aliases: CRKL, CRK like proto-oncogene, adaptor protein
- External IDs: OMIM: 602007; MGI: 104686; GeneCards: CRKL
Available structures
PDB	Ortholog search: PDBe RCSB
PDB	List of PDB id codes 2BZX, 2BZY, 2EO3, 2LQN, 2LQW

Gene location (Human)
Chr.	Chromosome 22 (human)
Band	22q11.21	Start	20,917,407 bp
Band	22q11.21	End	20,953,747 bp

Gene location (Mouse)
Chr.	Chromosome 16 (mouse)
Band	16|16 A3	Start	17,269,851 bp
Band	16|16 A3	End	17,305,298 bp
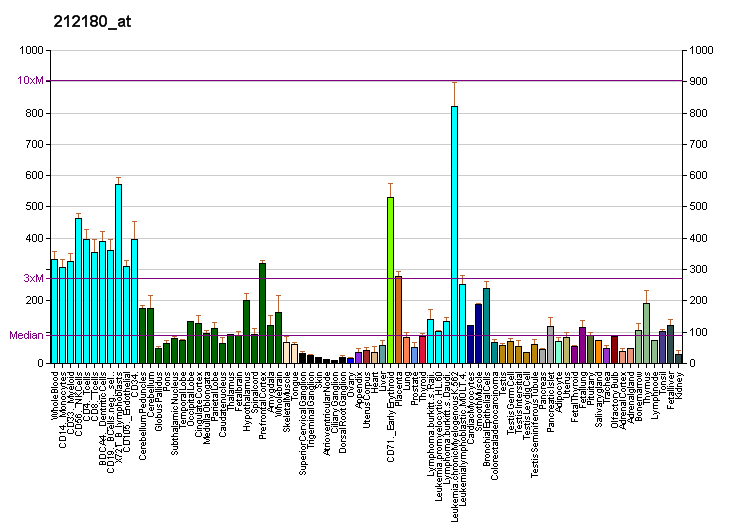
RNA expression pattern
Bgee	Human / Mouse (ortholog); Top expressed in: secondary oocyte; ventricular zone; Brodmann area 10; Skeletal muscle tissue of rectus abdominis; paraflocculus of cerebellum; internal globus pallidus; embryo; ganglionic eminence; amniotic fluid; cerebellar vermis / Top expressed in: Rostral migratory stream; tail of embryo; medial ganglionic eminence; tibiofemoral joint; internal carotid artery; genital tubercle; vestibular membrane of cochlear duct; zygote; fetal liver hematopoietic progenitor cell; maxillary prominence; More reference expression data
BioGPS	More reference expression data
Gene ontology
Molecular function	protein binding; signal transducer activity; RNA binding; cadherin binding; phosphotyrosine residue binding; identical protein binding
Cellular component	cytoplasm; cytosol; endosome; extracellular exosome; nucleoplasm; neuromuscular junction; protein-containing complex; synapse; extrinsic component of postsynaptic membrane
Biological process	animal organ morphogenesis; pattern specification process; JNK cascade; development of the heart; Ras protein signal transduction; intracellular signal transduction; blood vessel development; parathyroid gland development; anterior/posterior pattern specification; positive regulation of cell population proliferation; thymus development; positive regulation of substrate adhesion-dependent cell spreading; regulation of cell growth; urogenital system development; neuron migration; B cell apoptotic process; negative regulation of protein phosphorylation; positive regulation of protein phosphorylation; regulation of leukocyte migration; outflow tract morphogenesis; lipid metabolism; spermatogenesis; single fertilization; synapse assembly; fibroblast growth factor receptor signaling pathway; male gonad development; regulation of gene expression; negative regulation of gene expression; dendrite development; cytokine-mediated signaling pathway; hippocampus development; cerebral cortex development; establishment of cell polarity; regulation of cell adhesion mediated by integrin; helper T cell diapedesis; reelin-mediated signaling pathway; positive regulation of Ras protein signal transduction; retinoic acid receptor signaling pathway; regulation of dendrite development; T cell receptor signaling pathway; cell chemotaxis; pharynx development; positive regulation of ERK1 and ERK2 cascade; cellular response to transforming growth factor beta stimulus; response to fibroblast growth factor; endothelin receptor signaling pathway; activation of GTPase activity; acetylcholine receptor signaling pathway; cerebellar neuron development; cellular response to interleukin-7; positive regulation of glial cell migration; regulation of skeletal muscle acetylcholine-gated channel clustering; cranial skeletal system development; regulation of T cell migration
Sources:Amigo / QuickGO
Orthologs
Databases	NCBI: entry; OMA: entry
Species	Human	Mouse
Entrez	1399	12929
Ensembl	ENSG00000099942	ENSMUSG00000006134
UniProt	P46109	P47941
RefSeq (mRNA)	NM_005207	NM_001277231; NM_007764
RefSeq (protein)	NP_005198	NP_001264160; NP_031790
Location (UCSC)	Chr 22: 20.92 – 20.95 Mb	Chr 16: 17.27 – 17.31 Mb
PubMed search
- Wikidata
View/Edit Human	View/Edit Mouse

Crk-like protein is a protein that in humans is encoded by the CRKL gene.

== Function ==
v-CRK avian sarcoma virus CT10-homolog-like contains one SH2 domain and two SH3 domains. CRKL has been shown to activate the RAS and JUN kinase signaling pathways and transform fibroblasts in a RAS-dependent fashion. It is a substrate of the BCR-ABL tyrosine kinase and plays a role in fibroblast transformation by BCR-ABL. In addition, CRKL has oncogenic potential.

CrkL together with Crk participates in the Reelin signaling cascade downstream of DAB1.

== Interactions ==
CRKL has been shown to interact with:

- Abl gene,
- BCAR1,
- BCR gene,
- CBLB,
- CD117,
- CD34,
- Cbl gene,
- Dock2,
- EPOR,
- GAB1,
- GAB2,
- INPP5D,
- MAP4K1,
- MAP4K5,
- NEDD9,
- PIK3R2,
- Paxillin
- RAPGEF1,
- RICS,
- STAT5A,
- Syk, and
- WAS.

== See also ==
- Crk
