= Gestational choriocarcinoma =

Malignant trophoblastic tumour arising from gestation

Gestational choriocarcinoma is a form of gestational trophoblastic neoplasia, which is a type of gestational trophoblastic disease (GTD), that can occur during pregnancy. It is a rare disease where the trophoblast, a layer of cells surrounding the blastocyst, undergoes abnormal developments, leading to trophoblastic tumors. The choriocarcinoma can metastasize to other organs, including the lungs, kidney, and liver. The amount and degree of choriocarcinoma spread to other parts of the body can vary greatly from person to person.

Gestational choriocarcinoma can happen during and after any type of pregnancy event, though risk of the disease is higher in and after complete or partial molar pregnancies. Risk of disease may also be higher in those experiencing pregnancy at younger or older ages that average, such as below 15 years old or above 45 years old. Those with gestational choriocarcinoma may experience abnormal vaginal bleeding, abdominal pain, and have high levels of human chorionic gonadotropin (hCG), in addition to history of molar pregnancy or other metastatic cancer. A combination of history, symptoms, human chorionic gonadotropin levels, and imaging can be used in the diagnosis process, with ultrasonography being commonly used to image. Approximately 50% of those with gestational choriocarcinoma have experienced molar pregnancy, approximately 25% developed the disease after a regular, term pregnancy, and other situations have included history of ectopic pregnancy, where the pregnancy does not occur in the uterus.

Guidelines from the Federation of Gynecologists and Obstetricians (FIGO), Royal College of Obstetricians and Gynaecologists (RCOG), European Society for Medical Oncology (ESMO), and Royal Australian and New Zealand College of Obstetricians and Gynaecologists (RANZCOG) exist to evaluate risk and treatment of the disease. There are generally three levels of risk: low risk, high risk, and ultrahigh risk. The primary form of treatment is chemotherapy with one or more agents. Duration can go upwards of six weeks following the return of human chorionic gonadotropin levels to the normal range. Depending on the risk of gestational trophoblastic disease (GTD) development, such as in certain people with mole pregnancies, chemotherapy has been used in a preventative manner in the past. However, this type of use is now advised against due to risk of toxicity and resistance to agents that may be needed in future treatment of the disease, on top of medical costs. Guidelines also detail options for salvage therapies in the situation of resistance to preferred choice of chemotherapy and surgical procedures possible in the situation of drug-resistant tumors.

== Signs and symptoms ==
Vaginal bleeding is a common symptom of gestational choriocarcinoma. In the event the gestational choriocarcinoma has already spread to other parts of the body, bleeding events in other organs may be the first symptom. If the choriocarcinoma has metastasized to the lungs, one of the most common organs of metastasis, then symptoms may include abnormally quick breathing, coughing, and chest pain. However, it is also possible for there to be none of these symptoms and only a difference in biomarkers in an individual instead.

Uterine enlargement as seen in an ultrasound can be a presenting sign of gestational choriocarcinoma. Transvaginal ultrasounds may also be used in screening for the disease, with the positron emission tomography (PET) scan, computed tomography (CT), and magnetic resonance imaging (MRI) in locations such as the abdomen, pelvis, and brain being other imaging options. Chest x-rays may also be used to see if gestational choriocarcinoma has potentially spread to the lungs.

Human chorionic gonadotropin is a hormone produced by the trophoblast and can be measured in both urine and blood. Another option of measuring this biomarker level is through lumbar puncture, which can show fluid-to-serum ratio of human chorionic gonadotropic and reflect whether the disease has potentially spread to the central nervous system. Elevated or rising human chorionic gonadotropin can be a sign of gestational choriocarcinoma, though it is also used as a biomarker in other types of gestational trophoblastic diseases (GTD). It is useful not only for diagnosis but also for monitoring disease progression, treatment response, and potential of recurring gestational choriocarcinoma.

== Causes ==
Gestational choriocarcinoma (GC) is the most aggressive form of trophoblastic tumor; it most commonly arises from certain fertilization defects, such as molar pregnancy, which results in increased level of growth factors and uncontrolled proliferation of trophoblasts in the uterus. Statistics from clinical cases have shown that GC is associated with any pregnancy events, with 50% of GC arise from hydatidiform moles, 25% from gestation, and 25% from abortion or tubal pregnancy.

=== Risk factors ===
The exact underlying causes for this disease are still not fully elucidated, as the condition is rare and it is clinically difficult to distinguish it from invasive moles, another type of trophoblastic tumor that present some similarities to GC. However, several risk factors have been reported to have associations with gestational choriocarcinoma:

- Maternal age. This is one of the two well-established risk factors for GC. Many studies have shown that the risk of developing GC increased very rapidly in gestational women older than 40 years old.
- Prior history of complete hydatidiform mole. This is another well-established risk factor for GC. It has been showed that the risk of having GC after a complete hydatidiform mole is significantly higher than after a live birth.
- Others risk factors such as reproductive factors, use of oral contraceptives, diet and environmental factors were also reported. But because of data inconsistency, such associations are still questionable. For example, there is a case-control study showed that there's a significant association of GC in women having more than 5 births. But other studies had showed no association when corrected for age.

=== Pathogenesis ===
At the cellular level, any abnormalities in the placental trophoblastic proliferation could potentially contribute to molar pregnancy and tumor development. There are three different types of trophoblasts: cytotrophoblasts, syncytiotrophoblasts, and intermediate trophoblasts. Each of them possesses distinct specialized functions to support a developing embryo. Cytotrophoblasts are the germinating cells that forms the chorion villi and can be differentiated into syncytiotrophoblasts which produce hCG and can intrude to the inner muscle layer of the uterus to help embed the developing embryo, and intermediate trophoblasts which spread throughout the chorion villi to support maternal-fetal circulation. Malignant cellular transformation of all of these three trophoblastic cells contribute to the development of gestational choriocarcinoma. Common pathological features of GC include abnormal trophoblastic enlargement, loss of trophoblastic specialized features and functions, absence of villi in the placenta, abnormal bleeding, and necrosis.

Many efforts have been made to try to understand the mechanism of how non-malignant mole could become invasive. It is suspected that activation of certain oncogenes (such as up-regulations of MDM2, c-ERB2, and BLC2) and inactivation of tumor suppressor genes (such as up-regulations of p53, p21) were involved in the processes of genetic changes in this malignant transformation. But trophoblastic cells, by nature, are highly active in cell division, the increased activities of those genes are also necessary to maintain their normal cell function. Therefore, it is still unclear how significantly these genetic changes are in the pathogenesis of gestational choriocarcinoma.

Recent research in the role of long non-coding RNAs (lncRNAs) in the GC development is believed to bring hope in this field. Long non-coding RNAs are groups of RNAs that do not code for protein expression and are usually over 200 nucleotides long; they are increasingly recognized to have essential role in many aspects of cellular function, like transcriptional regulation, sub-cellular protein localization, and epigenetic remodeling. To date, several types of lncRNAs are reported to have role in GC pathogenesis, which are metastasis-associated lung adenocarcinoma transcript 1 (MALAT1), H19, maternally expressed gene 3 (MEG3), prostate cancer antigen 3 (PCA3), the long intergenic non-coding RNA 00261 (LINC00261), etc. However, as many of these studies are still in the preliminary stages, more investigation is needed to fully understand the underlying mechanism.

== Diagnosis ==
Common characteristic manifestations of gestational choriocarcinoma include irregular vaginal bleeding and hydatidiform moles. A hydatidiform mole is a red hemorrhagic mass with various sizes in the uterus. Often, diagnosis is presumptive. It is based on clinical findings and the identification of a malignant trophoblast. One prevalent symptom is vaginal bleeding after a pregnancy, abortion, or hydatidiform mole. In the presence of choriocarcinoma, a pregnancy test will be positive even if there is no embryo/fetus.

A confirmed diagnosis usually happens after the disease has progressed to a late clinical stage. This is partly due to the wide spectrum and rare clinical presentations of the disease. Individuals presented with the disease are mostly in their reproductive years.

Similar to other non-gestational tumors, gestational choriocarcinoma can be reflected via an elevated level in serum hCG concentration. Besides the change in serum hCG levels, the diagnosis of gestational choriocarcinoma also focuses on the presence of metastases after any types of pregnancy events. Based on the International Federation of Gynecology and Obstetrics (FIGO)'s updated guidelines on gestational trophoblastic disease management, the diagnostic criteria of a post-gestational trophoblastic neoplasia (GTN) is as follows:

1. Over a period of 3 weeks or longer (day 1, 7, 14, 21), there are 4 or more plateaued hCG levels.
2. Over a period of 2 weeks or longer (day 1, 7, 14), there are 3 consecutive weekly measurements of rising hCG levels.
3. A histological diagnosis of choriocarcinoma.

There are currently different guidelines available in terms of diagnosing and recommending treatment options for gestational trophoblastic neoplasia (GTN). The 4 guidelines identified are: the Royal College of Obstetricians and Gynecologists (RCOG), the International Federation of Gynecology and Obstetrics (FIGO), the European Society for Medical Oncology (ESMO), and the Royal Australian and New Zealand College of Obstetricians and Gynecologists (RANZCOG). The differences in GTN diagnosis between the guidelines are as follows:

Comparison chart of available guidelines on gestational trophoblastic neoplasia (GTN) diagnosis criteria
	RCOG	ESMO	FIGO	RANZCOG
Clinical presentation		x		x
FIGO Criteria (*see above)	x	x	x	x
Urine hCG level	x			
Post-molar hCG level		x	x	

To differentiate gestational choriocarcinoma from other tumors such as lung or brain cancers, a genetic test is usually completed on top of a pathological diagnosis. DNA genotyping is a powerful tool that helps with the differentiation. The technique can accurately determine the time that it takes to develop the observed tumor and the type of index gestation, which includes term pregnancy, molar gestation, or non-molar abortion.

== Treatment ==
Due to the susceptibility of choriocarcinomas to chemotherapy, it is the first line treatment for this disease. Treatment course depends on the FIGO Scoring System for GTN, which has various prognostic factors, and categorizes based on low risk with a score of 0-6 and high risk with a score of 7 and above.

=== Low risk ===
Individuals with low risk GTN are usually treated with single agent chemotherapy, such as methotrexate and folinic acid (MTX/FA) or actinomycin D (ActD). Other treatment options for those with low risk include hysterectomy and surgical removal of the tumor if possible.

=== High risk ===
Those with high risk GTN receive a multi-agent chemotherapy regimen, usually consisting of a weekly rotation of etoposide, methotrexate, and actinomycin D given one week and cyclophosphamide and vincristine given the following week, with variations to treatment occurring on a patient-specific basis. In individuals who relapse, secondary chemotherapy is needed where treatment may vary from the original regimen. The treatment includes a platinum-etopside combination given with other chemotherapy medications, such as methotrexate and actinomycin D (EMA-EP), bleomycin (BEP), or ifosfamide (VIP, ICE). Additional treatment also consists of surgery and radiotherapy if deemed appropriate for the individual. This condition can also result in resistance to the medications used to treat it and failure of their success in the individuals. If this occurs, individuals usually undergo a more intensive medication regimen than what was originally given to them.

=== Immune checkpoint inhibitors ===
New treatment options designed to reduce the risk of resistance are currently being researched, such as immune checkpoint inhibitors. Studies of gestational choriocarcinoma demonstrate an increased expression of the ligand PD-L1 and its corresponding receptor PD-1, leading to drug research and development into medications that can block the PD-1 receptor, such as Pembrolizumab. In individuals requiring more intensive chemotherapy options, using an immune checkpoint inhibitor may be preferable to long-term use of multi-agent chemotherapy to prevent prolonged toxicity to the body.

FIGO Scoring System for GTN
Prognostic Factor	0	1	2	4
Age	<40	≥40	–	–
Previous Pregnancy	Hydatidiform mole	Abortion	Term	–
Months since last pregnancy	Less than 4	4 to 6	7-12	>12
Pre-treatment hCG (IU/mL)	<10^{3}	10^{3} to 10^{4}	>10^{4} to 10^{5}	>10^{5}
Largest tumor size, including uterus	<3 cm	3–4 cm	≥5 cm	–
Site of spread	Lung	Spleen or kidney	GI Tract	Brain, liver
Number of metastases	–	1 to 4	5-8	>8
Previous Failed chemotherapy	–	–	Single Drug	≥2

== Prognosis ==
The survival rate following treatment with chemotherapy is approximately at least 90%. If gestational choriocarcinoma has spread to the liver in an individual, survival rate may be lower. Overall survival rate is also higher when management of gestational choriocarcinoma occurs in a setting with physicians familiar with the condition. Earlier diagnosis and treatment intervention can lead to greater success in preserving potential of future pregnancy in those seeking it.

Return of human chorionic gonadotropic levels to within the bounds of normal values lowers the chance of recurring gestational choriocarcinoma. These levels can be checked monthly as follow-up. For chemotherapy, patients should wait a minimum of one year following chemotherapy before they plan to have a child to minimize the chance of miscarriage.
