= A431 cells =

A431 cells are a model human cell line (epidermoid carcinoma) used in biomedical research.

== Characteristics ==
A431 cells were established from an epidermoid carcinoma in the skin (epidermis) of an 85- year-old female patient. Epidermal growth factor (EGF) stimulation of A431 cells induces rapid tyrosine phosphorylation of intracellular signaling proteins which control cellular processes such as growth, proliferation and apoptosis. At low (picomolar) concentrations, EGF promotes cell growth of A431 cells whereas at higher (nanomolar) concentrations it inhibits growth by causing the cells to terminally differentiate. Treatment of A431 cells with bradykinin reduces basal and EGF-induced EGFR phosphorylation. Treatment with Sertoli cell secreted growth factor (SCSGF) strongly induces cell proliferation. Stimulation of A431 cells with phorbol esters induces expression of interleukin 1-related protein IL1H.

== Research Applications ==
A431 cells are used in studies of the cell cycle and cancer-associated cell signalling pathways since they express abnormally high levels of the Epidermal growth factor receptor (EGFR). They are often used as a positive control for EGFR expression. They contain no functional p53, a potent tumor suppressor gene, and are highly sensitive to mitogenic stimuli. In xenografts, A431 cells have shown antitumorigenic properties of introduced EGF and related radiation sensitization characteristics. Other in vitro studies have found EGF to also cause substantial lowering of DNA replication and protein synthesis. The A431 lines engineered to express tumor antigens such as mesothelin and GPC3 have been made as cell models to test cancer therapeutics.
