= Adapter molecule crk =

Protein found in humans

CRK
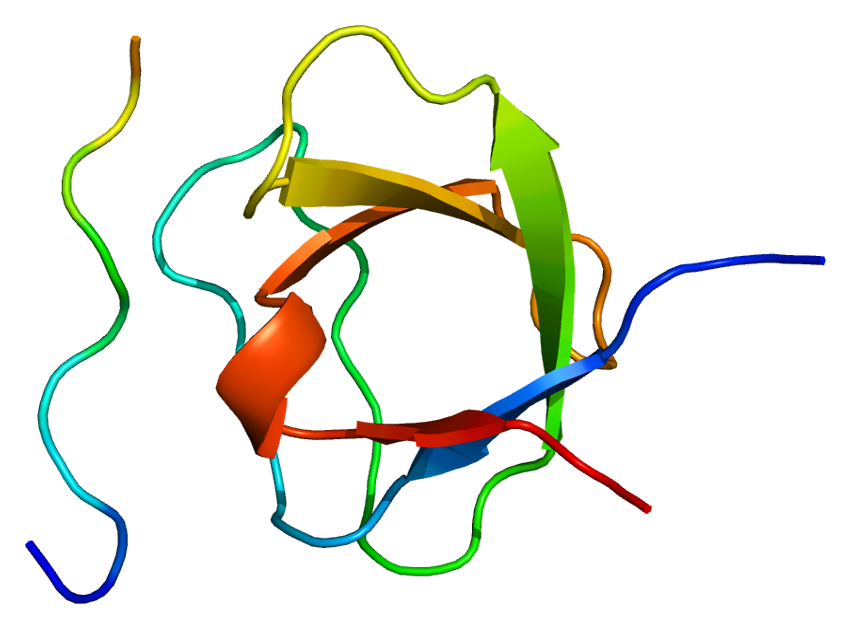

Identifiers
- Aliases: CRK, CRKII, p38, v-crk avian sarcoma virus CT10 oncogene homolog, CRK proto-oncogene, adaptor protein
- External IDs: OMIM: 164762; MGI: 88508; GeneCards: CRK
Available structures
PDB	Ortholog search: PDBe RCSB
PDB	List of PDB id codes 1JU5, 2DVJ, 2EYV, 2EYW, 2EYX, 2EYY, 2EYZ, 2MS4

Gene location (Human)
Chr.	Chromosome 17 (human)
Band	17p13.3	Start	1,420,689 bp
Band	17p13.3	End	1,463,162 bp

Gene location (Mouse)
Chr.	Chromosome 11 (mouse)
Band	11 B5|11 45.92 cM	Start	75,570,085 bp
Band	11 B5|11 45.92 cM	End	75,597,734 bp
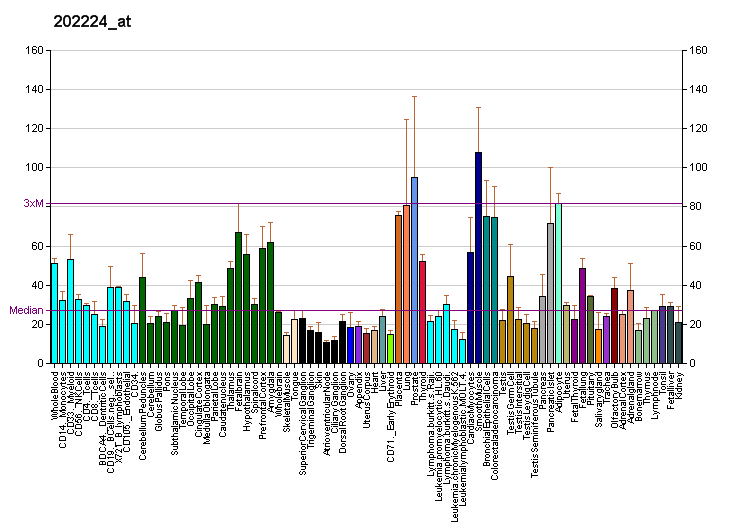

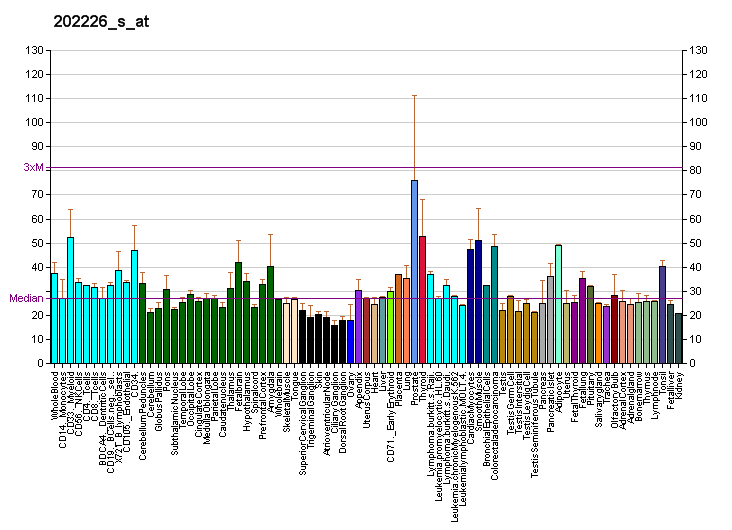

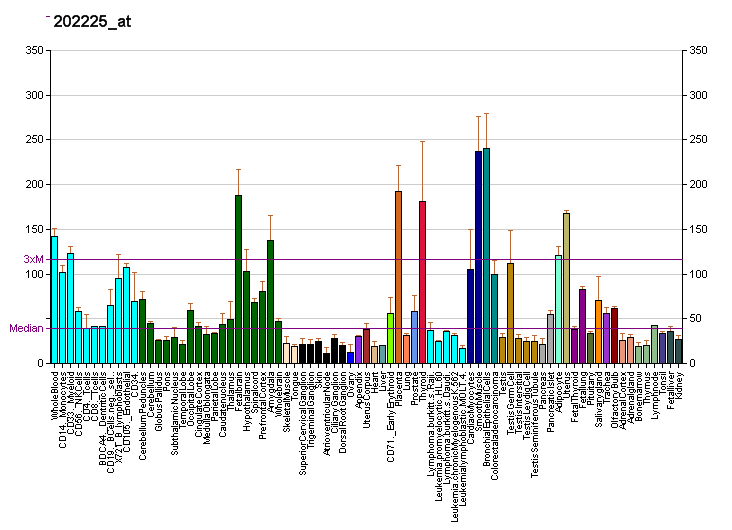
RNA expression pattern
Bgee	Human / Mouse (ortholog); Top expressed in: secondary oocyte; mucosa of sigmoid colon; pericardium; lower lobe of lung; trigeminal ganglion; pons; corpus epididymis; body of tongue; Achilles tendon; seminal vesicula / Top expressed in: atrioventricular valve; Gonadal ridge; ureter; seminal vesicula; atrium; epithelium of stomach; decidua; parotid gland; lateral septal nucleus; primitive streak; More reference expression data
BioGPS	More reference expression data
Gene ontology
Molecular function	protein-macromolecule adaptor activity; protein domain specific binding; ephrin receptor binding; protein binding; enzyme binding; insulin-like growth factor receptor binding; cytoskeletal protein binding; scaffold protein binding; phosphotyrosine residue binding; SH3 domain binding; SH2 domain binding; protein self-association; protein phosphorylated amino acid binding; protein tyrosine kinase binding
Cellular component	cytoplasm; cytosol; membrane; plasma membrane; actin cytoskeleton; extracellular exosome; nucleus; membrane raft; protein-containing complex
Biological process	Fc-gamma receptor signaling pathway involved in phagocytosis; regulation of GTPase activity; ephrin receptor signaling pathway; regulation of transcription by RNA polymerase II; regulation of Rac protein signal transduction; vascular endothelial growth factor receptor signaling pathway; regulation of actin cytoskeleton organization; positive regulation of substrate adhesion-dependent cell spreading; response to yeast; positive regulation of smooth muscle cell migration; response to hepatocyte growth factor; response to hydrogen peroxide; negative regulation of natural killer cell mediated cytotoxicity; cellular response to transforming growth factor beta stimulus; cellular response to nitric oxide; response to peptide; cellular response to nerve growth factor stimulus; cellular response to insulin-like growth factor stimulus; cellular response to endothelin; regulation of cell shape; regulation of signal transduction; positive regulation of cell growth; regulation of protein binding; regulation of wound healing; negative regulation of wound healing; response to cholecystokinin; regulation of cell motility; negative regulation of cell motility; neuron migration; regulation of leukocyte migration; lipid metabolism; dendrite development; cytokine-mediated signaling pathway; hippocampus development; cerebral cortex development; establishment of cell polarity; regulation of cell adhesion mediated by integrin; helper T cell diapedesis; reelin-mediated signaling pathway; regulation of dendrite development; cell chemotaxis; activation of GTPase activity; cerebellar neuron development; regulation of T cell migration
Sources:Amigo / QuickGO
Orthologs
Databases	NCBI: entry; OMA: entry
Species	Human	Mouse
Entrez	1398	12928
Ensembl	ENSG00000167193	ENSMUSG00000017776
UniProt	P46108	Q64010
RefSeq (mRNA)	NM_016823; NM_005206	NM_001277219; NM_001277221; NM_133656
RefSeq (protein)	NP_005197; NP_058431	NP_001264148; NP_001264150; NP_598417
Location (UCSC)	Chr 17: 1.42 – 1.46 Mb	Chr 11: 75.57 – 75.6 Mb
PubMed search
- Wikidata
View/Edit Human	View/Edit Mouse

Adapter molecule crk also known as proto-oncogene c-Crk is a protein that in humans is encoded by the CRK gene.

The CRK protein participates in the Reelin signaling cascade downstream of DAB1.

== Function ==
Adapter molecule crk is a member of an adapter protein family that binds to several tyrosine-phosphorylated proteins. This protein has several SH2 and SH3 domains (src-homology domains) and is involved in several signaling pathways, recruiting cytoplasmic proteins in the vicinity of tyrosine kinase through SH2-phosphotyrosine interaction. The N-terminal SH2 domain of this protein functions as a positive regulator of transformation whereas the C-terminal SH3 domain functions as a negative regulator of transformation. Two alternative transcripts encoding different isoforms with distinct biological activity have been described.

Crk together with CrkL participates in the Reelin signaling cascade downstream of DAB1.

v-Crk, a transforming oncoprotein from avian sarcoma viruses, is a fusion of viral "gag" protein with the SH2 and SH3 domains of cellular Crk. The name Crk is from "CT10 Regulator of Kinase" where CT10 is the avian virus from which was isolated a protein, lacking kinase domains, but capable of stimulating phosphorylation of tyrosines in cells.

Crk should not be confused with Src, which also has cellular (c-Src) and viral (v-Src) forms and is involved in some of the same signaling pathways but is a protein tyrosine-kinase.

== Interactions ==
CRK (gene) has been shown to interact with:

- BCAR1,
- Cbl gene,
- Dock180,
- EPS15,
- Epidermal growth factor receptor,
- Grb2,
- IRS4,
- MAP4K1,
- MAPK8,
- NEDD9,
- PDGFRA,
- PDGFRB,
- PTK2,
- Paxillin
- RAPGEF1,
- RICS,
- SH3KBP1, and
- SOS1.

== See also ==
- CrkL, "Crk-like" protein
