= ZNF384 =

Protein-coding gene in the species Homo sapiens

Identifiers
- Aliases: ZNF384, CAGH1, CAGH1A, CIZ, ERDA2, NMP4, NP, TNRC1, zinc finger protein 384
- External IDs: OMIM: 609951; MGI: 2443203; GeneCards: ZNF384

Gene location (Human)
Chr.	Chromosome 12 (human)
Band	12p13.31	Start	6,666,477 bp
Band	12p13.31	End	6,689,572 bp

Gene location (Mouse)
Chr.	Chromosome 6 (mouse)
Band	6|6 F2	Start	125,009,145 bp
Band	6|6 F2	End	125,037,870 bp
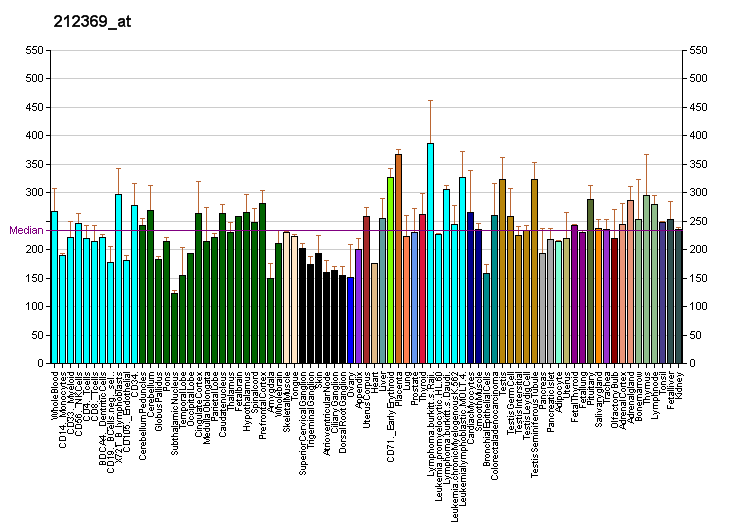
RNA expression pattern
Bgee	Human / Mouse (ortholog); Top expressed in: body of uterus; right lobe of thyroid gland; right ovary; right hemisphere of cerebellum; left lobe of thyroid gland; left uterine tube; right adrenal cortex; left ovary; granulocyte; Descending thoracic aorta / Top expressed in: otolith organ; utricle; Paneth cell; granulocyte; hand; tail of embryo; genital tubercle; foot; mesenteric lymph nodes; condyle; More reference expression data
BioGPS	More reference expression data
Gene ontology
Molecular function	metal ion binding; DNA binding; nucleic acid binding; DNA-binding transcription factor activity, RNA polymerase II-specific
Cellular component	nucleus
Biological process	regulation of transcription, DNA-templated; transcription, DNA-templated; regulation of transcription by RNA polymerase II
Sources:Amigo / QuickGO
Orthologs
Databases	NCBI: entry; OMA: entry
Species	Human	Mouse
Entrez	171017	269800
Ensembl	ENSG00000126746	ENSMUSG00000038346
UniProt	Q8TF68	n/a
RefSeq (mRNA)	NM_001039916; NM_001039917; NM_001039918; NM_001039919; NM_001039920 NM_001135734; NM_133476	NM_001252083; NM_175557; NM_001347452; NM_001372420; NM_001372422 NM_001372424
RefSeq (protein)	NP_001035009; NP_001129206; NP_597733	n/a
Location (UCSC)	Chr 12: 6.67 – 6.69 Mb	Chr 6: 125.01 – 125.04 Mb
PubMed search
- Wikidata
View/Edit Human	View/Edit Mouse

Zinc finger protein 384 is a protein that in humans is encoded by the ZNF384 gene.

== Function ==
This gene encodes a Cys_{2}His_{2}-type zinc finger protein, which may function as a transcription factor. This gene also contains long CAG trinucleotide repeats that encode consecutive glutamine residues. The protein appears to bind and regulate the promoters of the extracellular matrix genes MMP1, MMP3, MMP7 and COL1A1. Studies in mouse suggest that ZNF384 may be part of a general mechanical pathway that couples cell construction and function during extracellular matrix remodeling. Alternative splicing results in multiple transcript variants.

== Clinical significance ==
Recurrent rearrangements of this gene with the Ewing's sarcoma gene, EWSR1 on chromosome 22, or with the TAF15 gene on chromosome 17, or with the TCF3 (E2A) gene on chromosome 19, have been observed in acute leukemia.
