= Focal adhesion targeting region =

Focal adhesion targeting domain
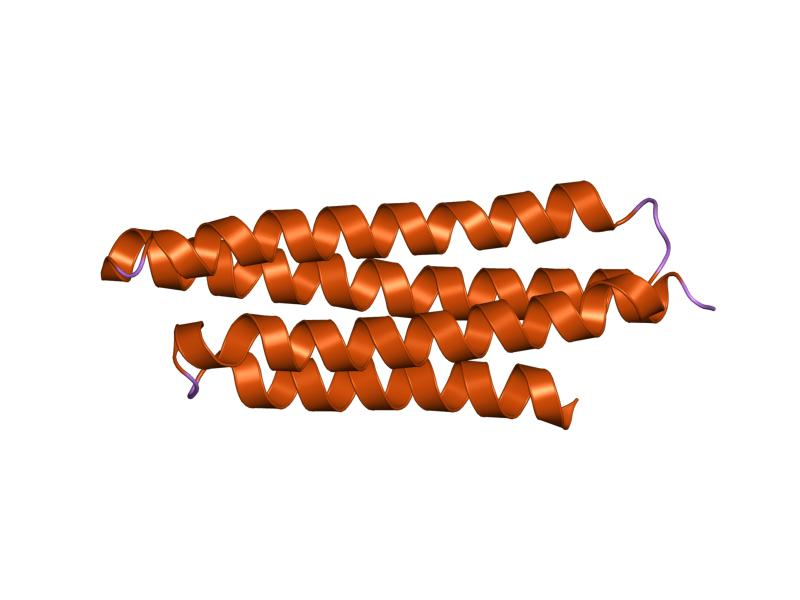
- Crystal structure of the FAT domain of Focal Adhesion Kinase

Identifiers
- Symbol: Focal_AT
- Pfam: PF03623
- InterPro: IPR005189
- SCOP2: 1ktm / SCOPe / SUPFAM
Available protein structures:
- Pfam: structures / ECOD
- PDB: RCSB PDB; PDBe; PDBj
- PDBsum: structure summary

In structural and cell biology, the focal adhesion targeting domain is a conserved protein domain that was first identified in focal adhesion kinase (FAK), also known as PTK2 protein tyrosine kinase 2 (PTK2).

Focal adhesions are multi-protein intracellular signalling complexes that link the cellular actin microfilament cytoskeleton, through the cell membrane via transmembrane integrin proteins, to the extracellular matrix. Focal adhesions form and dissipate as cells attach and detach from matrix during cell adhesion and cell migration.

The FAK focal adhesion targeting (FAT) domain is a C-terminal region necessary and sufficient for localizing FAK to focal adhesions, allowing FAK to regulate cell adhesion and migration by localizing its protein kinase activity at the junction of internal cytoskeleton and external cell attachment points. The crystal structure of FAT shows it to form a four-helix bundle that binds specifically to Leucine-Aspartate (LD)-repeat motif peptides in the related focal adhesion proteins paxillin (PXN), leupaxin (LPXN) and TGFB1I1/Hic-5.

FAT domains with a similar 4-helix bundle structure are also found in other proteins that localize to paxillin-containing focal adhesions and are involved in cell adhesion and migration, including the FAK-related protein kinase PTK2B/FAK2/PYK2, and alpha-catenin, vinculin, Programmed cell death protein 10 (PDCD10)/Cerebral Cavernous Malformation protein 3 (CCM3) and GIT1/GIT2.
