= BCAR1 =

Protein-coding gene in the species Homo sapiens

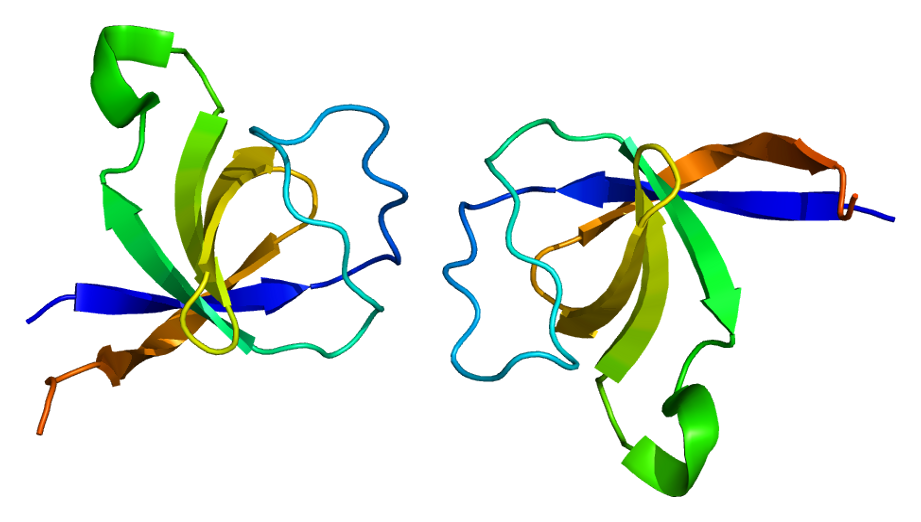

Identifiers
- Aliases: BCAR1, CAS, CAS1, CASS1, CRKAS, P130Cas, Cas family scaffolding protein, Cas family scaffold protein, BCAR1 scaffold protein, Cas family member
- External IDs: OMIM: 602941; MGI: 108091; GeneCards: BCAR1
Available structures
PDB	Ortholog search: PDBe RCSB
PDB	List of PDB id codes 1WYX, 3T6G

Gene location (Human)
Chr.	Chromosome 16 (human)
Band	16q23.1	Start	75,228,181 bp
Band	16q23.1	End	75,268,053 bp

Gene location (Mouse)
Chr.	Chromosome 8 (mouse)
Band	8|8 E1	Start	112,437,106 bp
Band	8|8 E1	End	112,470,441 bp
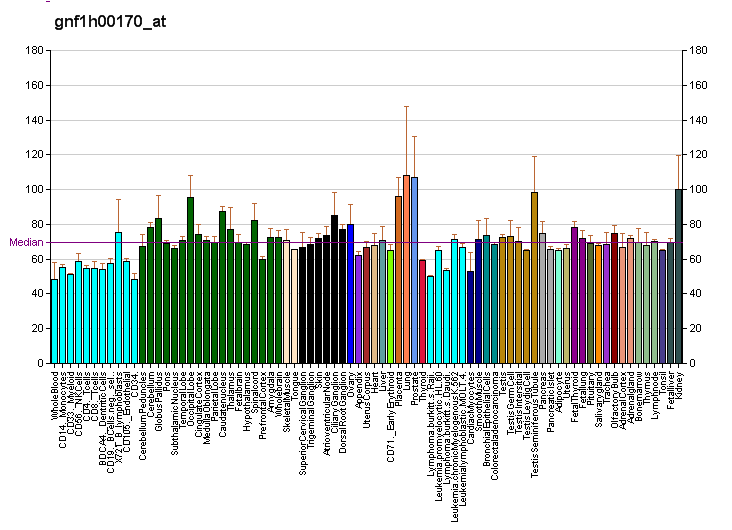
RNA expression pattern
Bgee	Human / Mouse (ortholog); Top expressed in: right hemisphere of cerebellum; ascending aorta; gastrocnemius muscle; apex of heart; mucosa of transverse colon; body of stomach; Descending thoracic aorta; human kidney; placenta; pituitary gland / Top expressed in: endothelial cell of lymphatic vessel; fossa; Paneth cell; motor neuron; condyle; retinal pigment epithelium; yolk sac; external carotid artery; internal carotid artery; cerebellar cortex; More reference expression data
BioGPS	More reference expression data
Gene ontology
Molecular function	SH3 domain binding; protein binding; protein kinase binding; signal transducer activity
Cellular component	cytoplasm; cytosol; focal adhesion; plasma membrane; cell junction; actin cytoskeleton; lamellipodium; ruffle
Biological process	regulation of apoptotic process; B cell receptor signaling pathway; G protein-coupled receptor signaling pathway; insulin receptor signaling pathway; neurotrophin TRK receptor signaling pathway; epidermal growth factor receptor signaling pathway; actin filament organization; positive regulation of cell migration; cellular response to hepatocyte growth factor stimulus; antigen receptor-mediated signaling pathway; cell division; positive regulation of endothelial cell migration; vascular endothelial growth factor receptor signaling pathway; cell adhesion; regulation of cell growth; cell chemotaxis; integrin-mediated signaling pathway; platelet-derived growth factor receptor signaling pathway; cell population proliferation; T cell receptor signaling pathway; hepatocyte growth factor receptor signaling pathway; cell migration; signal transduction; actin filament reorganization
Sources:Amigo / QuickGO
Orthologs
Databases	NCBI: entry; OMA: entry
Species	Human	Mouse
Entrez	9564	12927
Ensembl	ENSG00000050820; ENSG00000285460	ENSMUSG00000031955
UniProt	P56945	Q61140
RefSeq (mRNA)	NM_001170714; NM_001170715; NM_001170716; NM_001170717; NM_001170718 NM_001170719; NM_001170720; NM_001170721; NM_014567	NM_001198839; NM_009954
RefSeq (protein)	NP_001164185; NP_001164186; NP_001164187; NP_001164188; NP_001164189 NP_001164190; NP_001164191; NP_001164192; NP_055382	NP_001185768; NP_034084
Location (UCSC)	Chr 16: 75.23 – 75.27 Mb	Chr 8: 112.44 – 112.47 Mb
PubMed search
- Wikidata
View/Edit Human	View/Edit Mouse

Breast cancer anti-estrogen resistance protein 1 is a protein that in humans is encoded by the BCAR1 gene.

== Gene ==
BCAR1 is localized on chromosome 16 on region q, on the negative strand and it consists of seven exons. Eight different gene isoforms have been identified that share the same sequence starting from the second exon onwards but are characterized by different starting sites. The longest isoform is called BCAR1-iso1 (RefSeq NM_001170714.1) and is 916 amino acids long, the other shorter isoforms start with an alternative first exon.

== Cas-family ==
p130Cas/BCAR1 is a member of the Cas family (Crk-associated substrate) of adaptor proteins which is characterized by the presence of multiple conserved motifs for protein–protein interactions, and by extensive tyrosine and serine phosphorylations. The Cas family comprises other three members: NEDD9 (Neural precursor cell expressed, developmentally down-regulated 9, also called Human enhancer of filamentation 1, HEF-1 or Cas-L), EFS (Embryonal Fyn-associated substrate), and CASS4 (Cas scaffolding protein family member 4). These Cas proteins have a high structural homology, characterized by the presence of multiple protein interaction domains and phosphorylation motifs through which Cas family members can recruit effector proteins. However, despite the high degree of similarity, their temporal expression, tissue distribution and functional roles are distinct and not overlapping. Notably, the knock-out of p130Cas/BCAR1 in mice is embryonic lethal, suggesting that other family members do not show an overlapping role in development.

== Structure ==
p130Cas/BCAR1 is a scaffold protein characterized by several structural domains. It possesses an amino N-terminal Src-homology 3 domain (SH3) domain, followed by a proline-rich domain (PRR) and a substrate domain (SD). The substrate domain consists of 15 repeats of the YxxP consensus phosphorylation motif for Src family kinases (SFKs). Following the substrate domain is the serine-rich domain, which forms a four-helix bundle. This acts as a protein-interaction motif, similar to those found in other adhesion-related proteins such as focal adhesion kinase (FAK) and vinculin. The remaining carboxy-terminal sequence contains a bipartite Src-binding domain (residues 681–713) able to bind both the SH2 and SH3 domains of Src. p130Cas/BCAR1 can undergo extensive changes in tyrosine phosphorylation that occur predominantly in the 15 YxxP repeats within the substrate domain and represent the major post-translational modification of p130Cas/BCAR1. p130Cas/BCAR1 tyrosine phosphorylation can result from a diverse range of extracellular stimuli, including growth factors, integrin activation, vasoactive hormones and peptides ligands for G-protein coupled receptors. These stimuli triggers p130Cas/BCAR1 tyrosine phosphorylation and its translocation from cytosol to the cell membrane.

== Function ==
BCAR1 is a ubiquitously expressed adaptor molecule originally identified as the major substrate of v-Src and v-Crk . p130Cas/BCAR1 belongs to the Cas family of adaptor proteins and can act as a docking protein for several signalling partners. Due to its ability to associate with multiple signaling partners, p130Cas/BCAR1 contributes to the regulation to a variety of signaling pathways leading to cell adhesion, migration, invasion, apoptosis, hypoxia and mechanical forces. p130Cas/BCAR1 plays a role in cell transformation and cancer progression and alterations of p130Cas/BCAR1 expression and the resulting activation of selective signalling are determinants for the occurrence of different types of human tumors.

Due to the capacity of p130Cas/BCAR1, as an adaptor protein, to interact with multiple partners and to be regulated by phosphorylation and dephosphorylation, its expression and phosphorylation can lead to a wide range of functional consequences. Among the regulators of p130Cas/BCAR1 tyrosine phosphorylation, receptor tyrosine kinases (RTKs) and integrins play a prominent role. RTK-dependent p130Cas/BCAR1 tyrosine phosphorylation and the subsequent binding with specific downstream signaling molecule modulate cell processes such as actin cytoskeleton remodeling, cell adhesion, proliferation, migration, invasion and survival. Integrin-mediated p130Cas/BCAR1 phosphorylation upon adhesion to extracellular matrix (ECM) induces downstream signaling that is required for allowing cells to spread and migrate on the ECM. Recent work has shown that p130Cas/BCAR1 can undergo liquid-liquid phase separation forming droplets that bud from the focal adhesions- much like how oil forms droplets in water. These p130Cas/BCAR1 droplets contain other adhesion proteins, mRNAs and RNA binding proteins and play a role in suppressing mRNA translation in an adhesion dependent manner, hinting at a novel mechanism for regulating the cell state via phase separation. Both RTKs and integrin activation affect p130Cas/BCAR1 tyrosine phosphorylation and represent an efficient means by which cells utilize signals coming from growth factors and integrin activation to coordinate cell responses. Additionally, p130Cas/BCAR1 tyrosine phosphorylation on its substrate domain can be induced by cell stretching subsequent to changes in the rigidity of the extracellular matrix, allowing cells to respond to mechanical force changes in the cell environment.

== Clinical significance ==
Given the ability of p130Cas/BCAR1 scaffold protein to convey and integrate different type of signals and subsequently to regulate key cellular functions such as adhesion, migration, invasion, proliferation and survival, the existence of a strong correlation between deregulated p130Cas/BCAR1 expression and cancer was inferred. Deregulated expression of p130Cas/BCAR1 has been identified in several cancer types. Altered levels of p130Cas/BCAR1 expression in cancers can result from gene amplification, transcription upregulation or changes in protein stability. Overexpression of p130Cas/BCAR1 has been detected in human breast cancer, prostate cancer, ovarian cancer, lung cancer, colorectal cancer, hepatocellular carcinoma, glioma, melanoma, anaplastic large cell lymphoma and chronic myelogenous leukaemia. The presence of aberrant levels of hyperphosphorylated p130Cas/BCAR1 strongly promotes cell proliferation, migration, invasion, survival, angiogenesis and drug resistance. It has been demonstrated that high levels of p130Cas/BCAR1 expression in breast cancer correlate with worse prognosis, increased probability to develop metastasis and resistance to therapy. Conversely, lowering the amount of p130Cas/BCAR1 expression in ovarian, breast and prostate cancer is sufficient to block tumor growth and progression of cancer cells.

p130Cas/BCAR1 has potential uses as a diagnostic and prognostic marker for some human cancers. Since lowering p130Cas/BCAR1 in tumor cells is sufficient to halt their transformation and progression, it is conceivable to propose p130Cas/BCAR1 may represent a therapeutic target. However, the non-catalytic nature of p130Cas/BCAR1 makes difficult to develop specific inhibitors.
