= TLN2 =

Protein-coding gene in the species Homo sapiens

Identifiers
- Aliases: TLN2, ILWEQ, talin 2
- External IDs: OMIM: 607349; MGI: 1917799; GeneCards: TLN2

Gene location (Human)
Chr.	Chromosome 15 (human)
Band	15q22.2	Start	62,390,526 bp
Band	15q22.2	End	62,844,631 bp

Gene location (Mouse)
Chr.	Chromosome 9 (mouse)
Band	9|9 C	Start	67,124,369 bp
Band	9|9 C	End	67,466,985 bp
RNA expression pattern
Bgee	Human / Mouse (ortholog); Top expressed in: sural nerve; middle temporal gyrus; frontal pole; Brodmann area 46; orbitofrontal cortex; Brodmann area 10; Achilles tendon; ventricular zone; Brodmann area 23; Region I of hippocampus proper / Top expressed in: tail of embryo; spermatid; seminiferous tubule; superior cervical ganglion; medial dorsal nucleus; medial head of gastrocnemius muscle; ankle; human kidney; genital tubercle; soleus muscle; More reference expression data
BioGPS	n/a
Gene ontology
Molecular function	actin binding; actin filament binding; structural constituent of cytoskeleton; protein binding; structural molecule activity
Cellular component	cytoplasm; ruffle; cell junction; plasma membrane; synapse; cytoskeleton; membrane; cell-cell junction; focal adhesion; actin cytoskeleton
Biological process	cell adhesion; cell-cell junction assembly
Sources:Amigo / QuickGO
Orthologs
Databases	NCBI: entry; OMA: entry
Species	Human	Mouse
Entrez	83660	70549
Ensembl	ENSG00000171914	ENSMUSG00000052698
UniProt	Q9Y4G6	Q71LX4
RefSeq (mRNA)	NM_015059; NM_001394547	NM_001081242; NM_027458
RefSeq (protein)	NP_055874	NP_001074711; NP_001395227; NP_001395228; NP_001395229; NP_001395230 NP_081734
Location (UCSC)	Chr 15: 62.39 – 62.84 Mb	Chr 9: 67.12 – 67.47 Mb
PubMed search
- Wikidata
View/Edit Human	View/Edit Mouse

Talin-2 is a protein in humans that is encoded by the TLN2 gene. It belongs to the talin protein family. This gene encodes a protein related to talin-1, a cytoskeletal protein that plays a significant role in the assembly of actin filaments. Talin-2 is expressed at high levels in cardiac muscle and functions to provide linkages between the extracellular matrix and actin cytoskeleton at costamere structures to transduce force laterally.

== Structure ==
Human talin-2 is 271.4 kDa and 2542 amino acids in length. The size of talin-2 protein is similar to talin-1, and is relatively similar (74% identity, 86% similarity); the size of the talin-2 gene (200 kb) is however much larger than that of talin-1 (30 kb), due to differences in intron sizes. Talin-2 mRNA is expressed in multiple tissues, including cardiac muscle, mouse embryonic stem cells, brain, lung, skeletal muscle, kidney and testis; however expression is highest in cardiac muscle. A detailed analysis of the TLN2 gene revealed that the alternative splicing of TLN2 is complex and encodes multiple mRNA transcripts and protein isoforms. Studies revealed a promoter associated with a CpG island that accounts for most of the TLN2 expression in adult tissues. This promoter is separated from the first coding exon by approximately > 200 kb of alternatively spliced noncoding exons. The testis and kidney talin-2 isoforms lack the N-terminal 50% of the protein, and evidence suggests that this is the isoform expressed in elongating spermatids. Talin is also post-translationally modified via calpain 2-mediated cleavage, which may target it for ubiquitin-proteasome-mediated degradation and turnover of associated cell adhesion structures.

== Function ==
The expression of talin-2 in striated muscle is developmentally regulated. Undifferentiated myoblasts primarily express talin-1, and both mRNA and protein expression of talin-2 is upregulated during differentiation; ectopic expression of talin-2 in undifferentiated myoblasts dysregulates the actin cytoskeleton, demonstrating that the timing of talin-2 expression during development is critical. In mature cardiomyocytes and skeletal muscle, talin-2 is expressed at costameres and intercalated discs, thus demonstrating that talin2 links integrins and the actin cytoskeleton in stable adhesion complexes involving mature sarcomeres. Talin-2 appears to play a role in skeletal muscle development; specifically, in myoblast fusion, sarcomere assembly, and the integrity of myotendinous junctions. Ablation of both talin isoforms, talin-2 and talin-1 prevented normal myoblast fusion and sarcomere assembly, as well as assembly of integrin adhesion complexes, which was attributed to disrupted interactions between integrins and the actin cytoskeleton. The mRNA expression of talin-2 has been shown to be regulated by the muscle-specific fragile X mental retardation, autosomal homolog 1 (FXR1) protein, which binds talin2 mRNAs directly and represses translation. Knockout of FXR1 upregulates talin-2 protein, which disrupts the architecture of desmosomes and costameres in cardiac muscle.

Talin-2, like talin-1 appears to join ligand-bound integrins and the actin cytoskeleton, which enhances the affinity of integrins for the extracellular matrix and catalyzes focal adhesion-dependent signaling pathways, as well as reinforces the cytoskeletal-integrin structure in response to an applied force. The strength of the interaction between talin and integrin appears to be fine-tuned through differential expression of isoforms in different tissues. The talin-2/β1D-integrin isoforms that are expressed and colocalize in striated muscle form a markedly strong interaction, and a few amino acid deletions in the β1-integrin tail can alter this interaction by 1000-fold.

Talin-2 is found within the neuronal synaptic region in brain tissue, and plays a role in clathrin-mediated endocytosis, coordinating phosphatidylinositol synthesis, and modulating actin dynamics through interactions with PIP kinase type 1γ, the major phosphatidylinositol 4,5-bisphosphate-synthesizing enzyme of the brain.

== Clinical significance ==
In patients with temporal lobe epilepsy, talin-2 protein was detected in cerebrospinal fluid, whereas expression was absent in non-epileptic patients. Furthermore, postencephalitic epilepsy patients that were refractory to drug treatment exhibited markedly elevated levels of talin-2 protein in cerebrospinal fluid and reciprocally decreased levels in serum. These data suggest that talin-2 may prove useful as a biomarker for epilepsy, and may be pathologically linked to this disease.

Studies have also shown that TLN2 is a direct target of miR-132, which is epigenetically silenced in prostate cancer, suggesting that talin-2 may play a role in modulating cell adhesion in prostate cancer.

== Interactions ==
TLN2 has been shown to interact with:

- ACTA1,
- CD61,
- ITGB1,
- LAYN,
- PTK2,
