= TLN1 =

Protein-coding gene in the species Homo sapiens

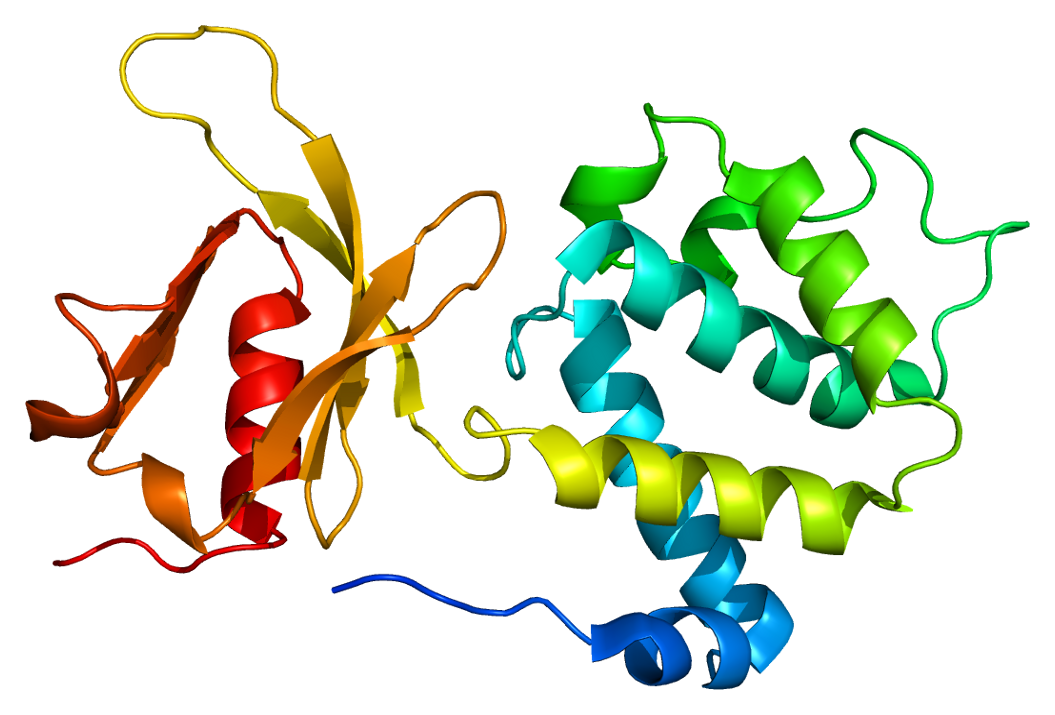

Identifiers
- Aliases: TLN1, ILWEQ, TLN, talin 1, talin-1
- External IDs: OMIM: 186745; MGI: 1099832; GeneCards: TLN1
Available structures
| PDB | Ortholog search: PDBe RCSB |
| PDB | List of PDB id codes 1SYQ, 2MWN, 4DJ9 |

Gene location (Human)
| Chr. | Chromosome 9 (human) |
| Band | 9p13.3 | Start | 35,696,948 bp |
| Band | 9p13.3 | End | 35,732,195 bp |

Gene location (Mouse)
| Chr. | Chromosome 4 (mouse) |
| Band | 4|4 A5 | Start | 43,531,519 bp |
| Band | 4|4 A5 | End | 43,562,691 bp |
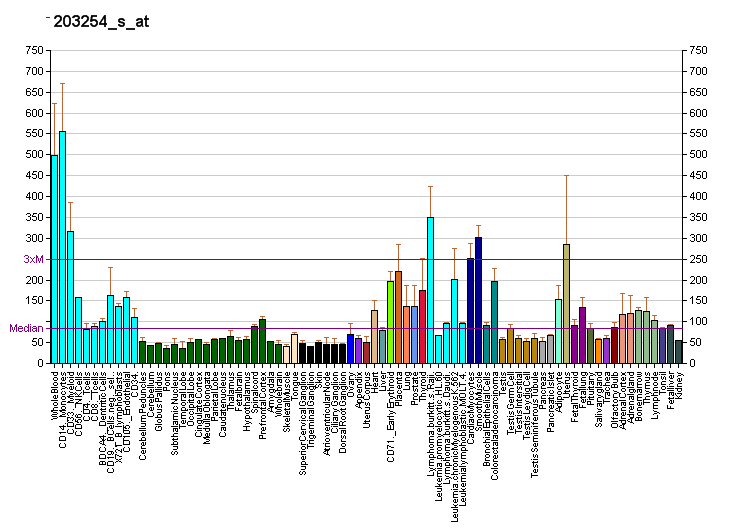
RNA expression pattern
| Bgee | Human / Mouse (ortholog); Top expressed in: popliteal artery; tibial arteries; ascending aorta; right coronary artery; Descending thoracic aorta; left coronary artery; muscle layer of sigmoid colon; gastric mucosa; body of uterus; stromal cell of endometrium / Top expressed in: granulocyte; stroma of bone marrow; tibiofemoral joint; ascending aorta; superior surface of tongue; gallbladder; left lung; external carotid artery; aortic valve; lymph node; More reference expression data |
| BioGPS | More reference expression data |
Gene ontology
| Molecular function | structural constituent of cytoskeleton; actin filament binding; LIM domain binding; integrin binding; protein binding; vinculin binding; protein-containing complex binding; actin binding; cadherin binding; phosphatidylserine binding; phosphatidylinositol binding |
| Cellular component | cytoskeleton; cell projection; ruffle membrane; ruffle; cytosol; extracellular exosome; membrane; cell surface; cell-cell junction; cell junction; focal adhesion; extracellular region; cytoplasm; plasma membrane |
| Biological process | cell-substrate junction assembly; IRE1-mediated unfolded protein response; muscle contraction; platelet degranulation; platelet aggregation; cell-cell junction assembly; cortical actin cytoskeleton organization; cell adhesion; viral process; integrin-mediated signaling pathway; integrin activation |
Sources:Amigo / QuickGO
Orthologs
| Databases | NCBI: entry; OMA: entry |
| Species | Human | Mouse |
| Entrez | 7094 | 21894 |
| Ensembl | ENSG00000137076 | ENSMUSG00000028465 |
| UniProt | Q9Y490 | P26039 |
| RefSeq (mRNA) | NM_006289 | NM_011602 |
| RefSeq (protein) | NP_006280 | NP_035732 |
| Location (UCSC) | Chr 9: 35.7 – 35.73 Mb | Chr 4: 43.53 – 43.56 Mb |
| PubMed search |
- Wikidata
| View/Edit Human | View/Edit Mouse |

Talin-1 is a protein that in humans is encoded by the TLN1 gene. Talin-1 is ubiquitously expressed, and is localized to costamere structures in cardiac and skeletal muscle cells, and to focal adhesions in smooth muscle and non-muscle cells. Talin-1 functions to mediate cell-cell adhesion via the linkage of integrins to the actin cytoskeleton and in the activation of integrins. Altered expression of talin-1 has been observed in patients with heart failure, however no mutations in TLN1 have been linked with specific diseases.

== Structure ==
Human talin-1 is 270.0 kDa molecular weight and 2541 amino acids. The N-terminal region of talin-1 is ~50 kDa in size and homologous to members of the ERM protein family which have a globular FERM domain (residues 86-400) that links the actin cytoskeleton to adhesion proteins. In addition to F-actin, the N-terminal region of talin-1 binds layilin, β1- and β3-integrin, and focal adhesion kinase. Talin-1 N-terminal region also binds acidic phospholipids for insertion into lipid bilayers. The rod domain (>200 kDa) has considerable flexibility and houses a conserved actin binding site, three vinculin binding sites, and also has an additional integrin binding site, termed IBS2. The head and rod domains are connected by an unstructured linker region (residues 401-481), which houses several sites of phosphorylation, as well as protease cleavage. Talin-1 can homodimerize in an antiparallel fashion, however, talin-1 and its closely related counterpart, talin-2 do not form heterodimers.

== Function ==
In mammals talin-1 is ubiquitously expressed; talin-1 is found complexed to integrins and localized to intercalated discs of cardiac muscle and to costamere structures of both skeletal and cardiac muscles, in correspondence with the I-band and M-line. Talin-1 is also found at focal adhesions of smooth muscle cells and non-muscle cells.

In undifferentiated cultures of myoblasts, talin-1 expression is perinuclear, and then progresses to a cytoplasmic distribution followed by a sarcomlemmal, costameric-like pattern by day 15 of differentiation. Homozygous disruption of TLN1 in mice is embryonic lethal, demonstrating that talin-1 is required for normal embryogenesis. It has been shown, however, that talin-1 expression is minor in adult cardiomyocytes, and becomes more prominent at costameres during cardiac hypertrophy induced by pharmacological and mechanical stress.

The primary function of talin-1 involves the linkage of integrins to the actin cytoskeleton and in the energy-dependent activation of integrins. Functions for talin-1 in specific tissues have been illuminated through conditional knockout animals. Studies employing the conditional knockout of talin 1 in skeletal muscle have demonstrated its role in maintaining integrin attachment sites at myotendinous junctions; knockout mice develop progressive myopathy and show deficits in muscle force generation. In platelets, conditional knockout of talin-1 results in the inability to activate integrins in response to platelet agonists, resulting in mice with severe hemostatic defects and resistance to arterial thrombosis. Conditional knockout of talin-1 in cardiomyocytes shows that mice have normal cardiac function at baseline, but improved function, blunted hypertrophy, and attenuated fibrosis when subjected to pressure overload-induced cardiac hypertrophy, which correlated with blunted ERK1/2, p38, Akt, and glycogen synthase kinase 3 responses. These data suggest that upregulation of talin-1 in cardiac hypertrophy may be detrimental to cardiomyocytes function.

== Clinical significance ==
In patients with heart failure, talin-1 expression in cardiomyocytes is increased relative to control cells.

== Interactions ==
TLN1 has been shown to interact with:

- ACTA1,
- CD61,
- ITGB1,
- LAYN,
- PXN,
- PIP5K1C,
- PTK2,
- SYNM, and
- VCL.

== See also ==
- Talin protein
