= Integrin beta 1 =

Mammalian protein found in Homo sapiens

ITGB1
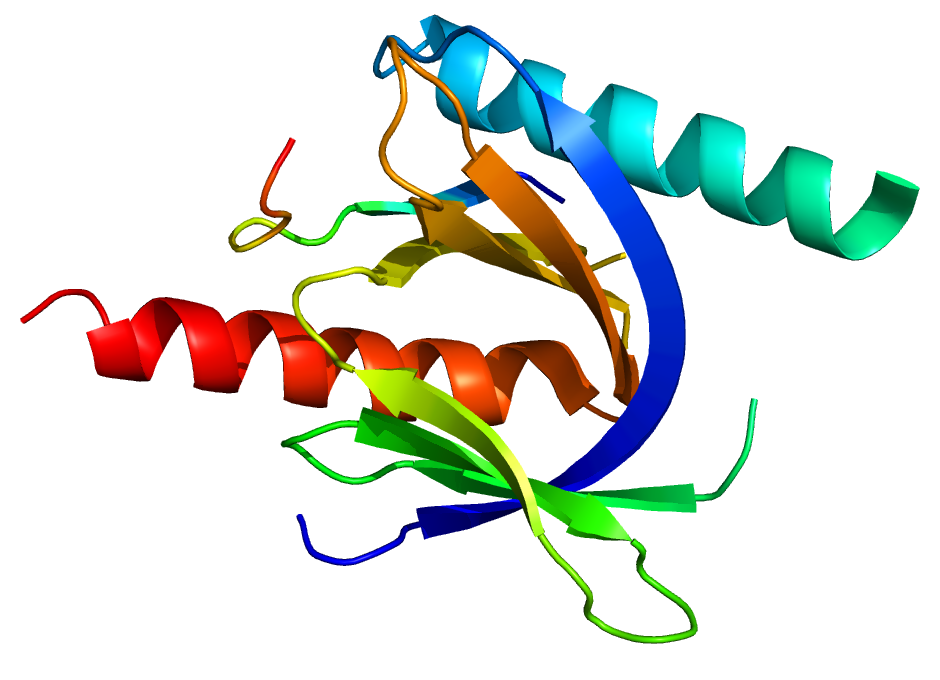

Identifiers
- Aliases: ITGB1, CD29, FNRB, GPIIA, MDF2, MSK12, VLA-BETA, VLAB, integrin subunit beta 1
- External IDs: OMIM: 135630; MGI: 96610; GeneCards: ITGB1
Available structures
PDB	Ortholog search: PDBe RCSB
PDB	List of PDB id codes 4WK4, 3G9W, 3T9K, 3VI3, 3VI4, 4DX9, 4WJK, 4WK0, 4WK2

Gene location (Human)
Chr.	Chromosome 10 (human)
Band	10p11.22	Start	32,900,319 bp
Band	10p11.22	End	33,005,792 bp

Gene location (Mouse)
Chr.	Chromosome 8 (mouse)
Band	8|8 E2	Start	129,412,135 bp
Band	8|8 E2	End	129,459,681 bp
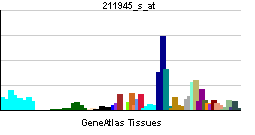
RNA expression pattern
Bgee	Human / Mouse (ortholog); Top expressed in: visceral pleura; seminal vesicula; tail of epididymis; parietal pleura; stromal cell of endometrium; tibia; smooth muscle tissue; superficial temporal artery; Descending thoracic aorta; palpebral conjunctiva / Top expressed in: Ileal epithelium; stroma of bone marrow; lactiferous gland; left lung lobe; cardiac muscle tissue of left ventricle; umbilical cord; atrium; uterus; calvaria; extraocular muscle; More reference expression data
BioGPS	More reference expression data
Gene ontology
Molecular function	virus receptor activity; metal ion binding; integrin binding; protein binding; laminin binding; cell adhesion molecule binding; collagen binding involved in cell-matrix adhesion; coreceptor activity; protease binding; fibronectin binding; actin binding; C-X3-C chemokine binding; protein heterodimerization activity; protein-containing complex binding; cadherin binding; signaling receptor activity
Cellular component	cytoplasm; endosome; membrane; melanosome; ruffle; integrin alpha8-beta1 complex; synapse; ruffle membrane; integrin complex; perinuclear region of cytoplasm; cell projection; dendritic spine; cell surface; cleavage furrow; integrin alpha7-beta1 complex; extracellular exosome; lamellipodium; integral component of membrane; recycling endosome; integrin alpha1-beta1 complex; intercalated disc; filopodium; neuromuscular junction; receptor complex; plasma membrane; integrin alpha11-beta1 complex; myelin sheath abaxonal region; synaptic membrane; integrin alpha10-beta1 complex; cell junction; integrin alpha2-beta1 complex; sarcolemma; external side of plasma membrane; cytoplasmic vesicle; integrin alpha3-beta1 complex; membrane raft; focal adhesion; glial cell projection; Schaffer collateral - CA1 synapse; glutamatergic synapse; integral component of synaptic membrane; protein-containing complex
Biological process	leukocyte cell-cell adhesion; cell migration involved in sprouting angiogenesis; stress fiber assembly; viral entry into host cell; B cell differentiation; neuron projection development; transforming growth factor beta receptor signaling pathway; regulation of collagen catabolic process; negative regulation of cell differentiation; cardiac muscle cell differentiation; cellular response to low-density lipoprotein particle stimulus; in utero embryonic development; cell-substrate adhesion; positive regulation of GTPase activity; regulation of immune response; viral process; dendrite morphogenesis; cell fate specification; G1 phase; heterotypic cell-cell adhesion; extracellular matrix organization; cell-cell adhesion mediated by integrin; cellular defense response; cell adhesion; formation of radial glial scaffolds; axon extension; leukocyte tethering or rolling; integrin-mediated signaling pathway; cell-matrix adhesion; sarcomere organization; negative regulation of anoikis; leukocyte migration; homophilic cell adhesion via plasma membrane adhesion molecules; visual learning; calcium-independent cell-matrix adhesion; cardiac muscle tissue development; negative regulation of Rho protein signal transduction; receptor internalization; regulation of cell cycle; positive regulation of cell population proliferation; positive regulation of apoptotic process; mesodermal cell differentiation; cell migration; germ cell migration; cell adhesion mediated by integrin; basement membrane organization; positive regulation of protein localization to plasma membrane; G1/S transition of mitotic cell cycle; phagocytosis; cytokine-mediated signaling pathway; cell projection organization; lamellipodium assembly; positive regulation of angiogenesis; modulation of chemical synaptic transmission; positive regulation of protein kinase B signaling; positive regulation of signaling receptor activity; positive regulation of cell migration
Sources:Amigo / QuickGO
Orthologs
Databases	NCBI: entry; OMA: entry
Species	Human	Mouse
Entrez	3688	16412
Ensembl	ENSG00000150093	ENSMUSG00000025809
UniProt	P05556	P09055
RefSeq (mRNA)	NM_002211; NM_033666; NM_033667; NM_033668; NM_033669 NM_133376	NM_010578
RefSeq (protein)	NP_002202; NP_391988; NP_596867	NP_034708
Location (UCSC)	Chr 10: 32.9 – 33.01 Mb	Chr 8: 129.41 – 129.46 Mb
PubMed search
- Wikidata
View/Edit Human	View/Edit Mouse

Integrin beta-1 (ITGB1), also known as CD29, is a cell surface receptor that in humans is encoded by the ITGB1 gene. This integrin associates with integrin alpha 1 and integrin alpha 2 to form integrin complexes which function as collagen receptors. It also forms dimers with integrin alpha 3 to form integrin receptors for netrin 1 and reelin. These and other integrin beta 1 complexes have been historically known as very late activation (VLA) antigens.

Integrin beta 1 is expressed as at least four different isoforms. In cardiac muscle and skeletal muscle, the integrin beta-1D isoform is specifically expressed, and localizes to costameres, where it aids in the lateral force transmission from the Z-discs to the extracellular matrix. Abnormal levels of integrin beta-1D have been found in limb girdle muscular dystrophy and polyneuropathy.

== Structure ==
Integrin beta-1 can exist as different isoforms via alternative splicing. Six alternatively spliced variants have been found for this gene which encode five proteins with alternate C-termini. Integrin receptors exist as heterodimers, and greater than 20 different integrin heterodimeric receptors have been described. All integrins, alpha and beta forms, have large extracellular and short intracellular domains. The cytoplasmic domain of integrin beta-1 binds to the actin cytoskeleton. Integrin beta-1 is the most abundant beta-integrin expressed and associates with at least 10 different integrin-alpha subunits.

== Function ==
Integrin family members are membrane receptors involved in cell adhesion and recognition in a variety of processes including embryogenesis, hemostasis, tissue repair, immune response and metastatic diffusion of tumor cells. Integrins link the actin cytoskeleton with the extracellular matrix and they transmit signals bidirectionally between the extracellular matrix and cytoplasmic domains. Beta-integrins are primarily responsible for targeting integrin dimers to the appropriate subcellular locations, which in adhesive cells is mainly focal adhesions. Integrin beta-1 mutants lose the ability to target to sites of focal adhesions.

Three novel isoforms of integrin beta-1 have been identified, termed beta-1B, beta-1C and beta-1D. Integrin beta-1B is transcribed when the proximal 26 amino acids of the cytoplasmic domain in exon 6 are retained and then succeeded by a 12 amino acid stretch from an adjacent intronic region. The integrin beta-1B isoform appears to act as a dominant negative in that it inhibits cell adhesion. A second integrin beta-1 isoform, termed beta-1C, was described to have an additional 48 amino acids appended to the 26 amino acids in the cytoplasmic domain; the function of this isoform was an inhibitory one on DNA synthesis in the G1 phase of the cell cycle. The third isoform, termed beta-1D, is a striated muscle-specific isoform, which replaces the canonical beta-1A isoform in cardiac and skeletal muscle cells. This isoform is produced from splicing into a novel additional exon between exons 6 and 7. The cytoplasmic domain of integrin beta-1D replaces the distal 21 amino acids (present in integrin beta-1A) with an alternative stretch of 24 amino acids (13 unique).

Integrin beta-1D appears to be developmentally regulated during myofibrilogenesis, appearing immediately following the fusion of myoblasts in C2C12 cell with rising levels throughout myofibrillar differentiation. Integrin beta-1D is specifically localized to costameres and intercalated discs of cardiac muscle and costameres, myotendinous junctions and neuromuscular junctions of skeletal muscle, and it appears to function in general like other integrins, as the clustering of beta-1D integrins on the surface of CHO cells resulted in tyrosine phosphorylation of pp125FAK and induced mitogen-activated protein kinase activation.

== Clinical significance ==
In patients with limb girdle muscular dystrophy, type 2C, beta-1D integrin has been shown to be severely reduced in skeletal muscle biopsies, coordinate with a reduction in alpha 7B-integrin and filamin 2.

In patients with sensitive-motor polyneuropathy, levels of integrin alpha-7B, integrin beta-1D and agrin were significantly reduced nearly to undetectable levels; and this corresponded with lower mRNA levels.

== Interactions ==
CD29 has been shown to interact with

- ACTN1;
- CD46,
- CD9,
- FHL2,
- Filamin,
- FLNB,
- CD81,
- GNB2L1,
- ITGB1BP1,
- LGALS8,
- MAP4K4,
- NME1,
- PKC alpha,
- TLN1,
- TSPAN4, and
- YWHAB.
