= Keith Burridge =

British academic

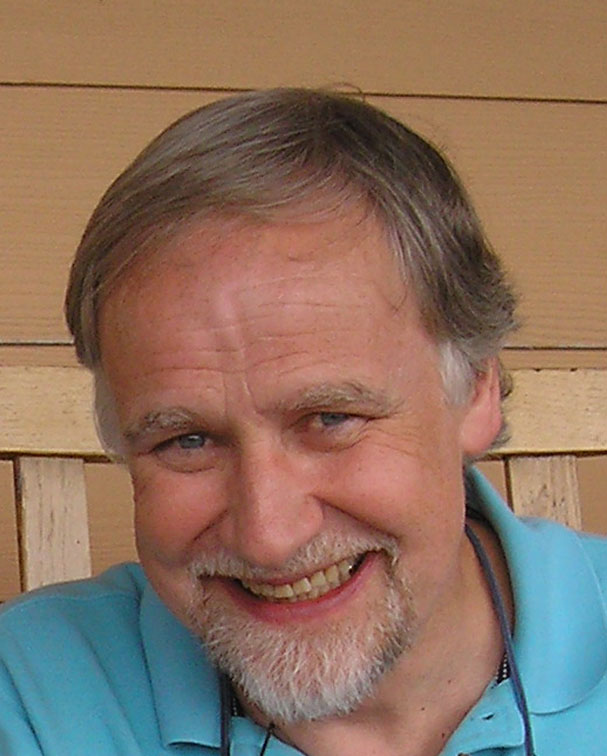
Keith Burridge

Keith Burridge (born 1 July 1950) is a British researcher and Kenan distinguished Professor at the University of North Carolina at Chapel Hill. His research on focal adhesions includes the discovery of many adhesion proteins including vinculin, talin and paxillin, and ranks him in top 1% of the most cited scientist in the field of molecular biology and genetics. Burridge has published more than 200 peer reviewed articles.

== Early life and education ==
He was born in 1950 in Dorset, England. He obtained his undergraduate degree in 1971 from the University of Cambridge, and then completed his PhD in Dennis Bray's laboratory in the MRC Laboratory of Molecular Biology (LMB), also in Cambridge, in 1975. Using biochemical techniques, he showed that at least two distinct types of myosin II exist in non-muscle cells and that some cells expressed both types.

== Focal adhesion research ==
He went as a postdoc to James D. Watson's laboratory at Cold Spring Harbor where he met Elias Lazarides. They decided to compile their work on α-actinin and showed that α-actinin is distributed periodically along stress fibers. They also noted that there was a concentration of α-actinin in plaques at the ends of stress fibers. Since these regions would several years later be named focal adhesions, α-actinin was the first protein found to be concentrated at these sites. While developing a procedure to purify α-actinin from smooth muscle, Burridge co-purified another protein, vinculin, independently of Benny Geiger's discovery.

In 1981 Burridge left Cold Spring Harbor Lab for a faculty position at the University of North Carolina at Chapel Hill, where he continued to work on focal adhesions. He discovered talin (protein) as another focal adhesion protein and then, in collaboration with Rick Horwitz's laboratory, showed that talin (protein) bound to the cytoplasmic domains of integrins. He then discovered other focal adhesion components including paxillin and contributed to the discovery of zyxin and palladin. Since then his work has focused on the signaling pathways emanating from focal adhesions, including RhoA-mediated contractility and tyrosine phosphorylation in response to adhesion.

== Playwright ==
In parallel with his scientific career, Keith Burridge has written several plays of varying length. His 10-minute play "Chocolates for Mr. Wolfowitz" appeared in the Knutsford Little Theatre short play festival of 2008 in the UK. "The Art of Deception", based on the true story of the art forger Han van Meegeren, won 2014 best new play by Playwrights First. "The First Woman President" is a one-woman, one act play, that was premiered in the Midtown International Theatre Festival in New York City in 2016. In the play Edith Wilson looks back to when she took over running the country while concealing from the public that her husband, President Woodrow Wilson, had suffered a stroke

== Distinction and awards ==
- 1988 Hettleman Prize.
- 2002 Freshman Medical Student Teaching Award, UNC School of Medicine.
- 2003 Kenan Distinguished Professor of Cell and Developmental Biology.
- 2003 Hyman Battle Medical Student Teaching Award.
- 2016 Fellow, the American Academy of Arts and Sciences.
