= TNS1 =

Protein-coding gene in the species Homo sapiens

Identifiers
- Aliases: TNS1, MST091, MST122, MST127, MSTP122, MSTP127, MXRA6, PPP1R155, TNS, MSTP091, tensin 1
- External IDs: OMIM: 600076; MGI: 104552; GeneCards: TNS1

Gene location (Human)
Chr.	Chromosome 2 (human)
Band	2q35	Start	217,799,789 bp
Band	2q35	End	218,002,995 bp

Gene location (Mouse)
Chr.	Chromosome 1 (mouse)
Band	1 C3|1 38.17 cM	Start	73,949,390 bp
Band	1 C3|1 38.17 cM	End	74,163,608 bp
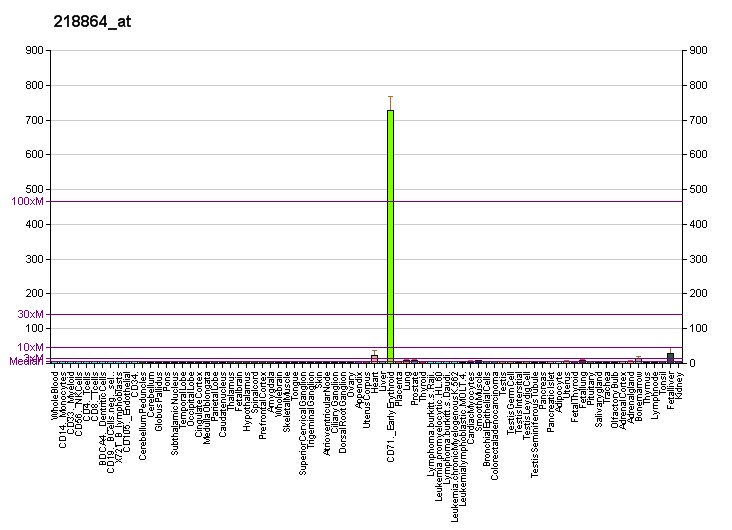

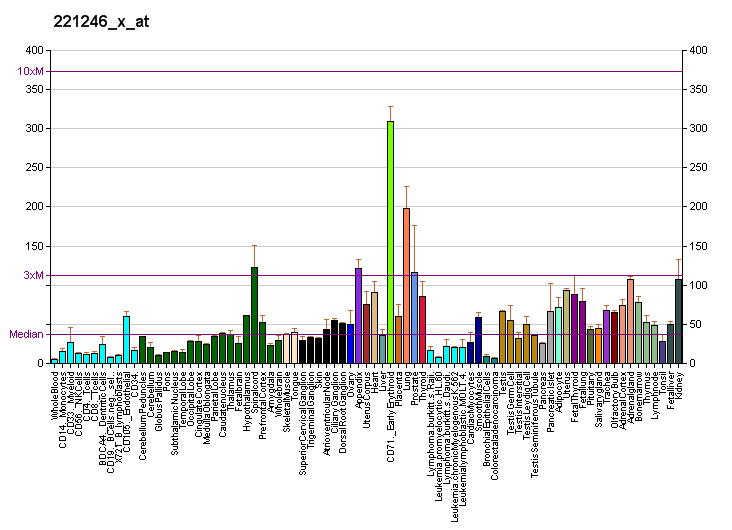

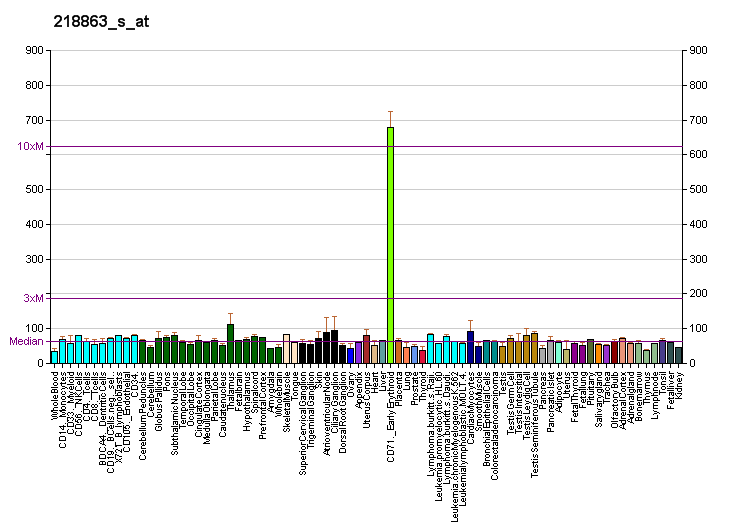
RNA expression pattern
Bgee	Human / Mouse (ortholog); Top expressed in: saphenous vein; urethra; tail of epididymis; lower lobe of lung; seminal vesicula; myocardium of left ventricle; cardiac muscle tissue of right atrium; right coronary artery; popliteal artery; tibial arteries / Top expressed in: ascending aorta; aortic valve; interventricular septum; right lung; left lung; right lung lobe; left lung lobe; muscle of thigh; tunica media of zone of aorta; myocardium of ventricle; More reference expression data
BioGPS	More reference expression data
Gene ontology
Molecular function	actin binding; protein binding; RNA binding
Cellular component	cytoplasm; cell-substrate junction; cell surface; cell junction; cytoskeleton; focal adhesion
Biological process	cell-substrate junction assembly; fibroblast migration
Sources:Amigo / QuickGO
Orthologs
Databases	NCBI: entry; OMA: entry
Species	Human	Mouse
Entrez	7145	21961
Ensembl	ENSG00000079308	ENSMUSG00000055322
UniProt	Q9HBL0; Q0VG54	n/a
RefSeq (mRNA)	NM_001308022; NM_001308023; NM_022648	NM_001289895; NM_027884; NM_177169
RefSeq (protein)	NP_001294951; NP_001294952; NP_072174; NP_001294951.1; NP_001294952.1	n/a
Location (UCSC)	Chr 2: 217.8 – 218 Mb	Chr 1: 73.95 – 74.16 Mb
PubMed search
- Wikidata
View/Edit Human	View/Edit Mouse

Tensin-1 is a protein that in humans is encoded by the TNS1 gene.

The protein encoded by this gene localizes to focal adhesions, regions of the plasma membrane where the cell attaches to the extracellular matrix. This protein crosslinks actin filaments and contains a Src homology 2 (SH2) domain, which is often found in molecules involved in signal transduction. This protein is a substrate of calpain II. A second transcript from this gene has been described, but its full length nature has not been determined.
