= Aspergillus striatulus =

Scientific classification
- Kingdom: Fungi
- Division: Ascomycota
- Class: Eurotiomycetes
- Order: Eurotiales
- Family: Aspergillaceae
- Genus: Aspergillus
- Species: A. striatulus

Binomial name
- Aspergillus striatulus Samson & W. Gams (1985)

Synonyms
- Apsergillus striatus

Species of fungus

Aspergillus striatulus (also named Apsergillus striatus) is a species of fungus in the genus Aspergillus. It is from the Nidulantes section. The species was first described in 1985. It has been isolated from mangrove mud in the Kagh Islands. It has been reported to produce asperthecin, aurantioemestrin, cycloisoemericellin, desferritriacetylfusigen, dithiosilvatin, emindol SA, emindol SB, 7-Hydroxyemodin, paxillin, 1-O-acetylpaxillin, penicillin G, sterigmatocystin, violaceic acid, violaceol I, and violaceol II.

== Growth and morphology ==
A. striatulus has been cultivated on both Czapek yeast extract agar (CYA) plates and Malt Extract Agar Oxoid® (MEAOX) plates. The growth morphology of the colonies can be seen in the pictures below.

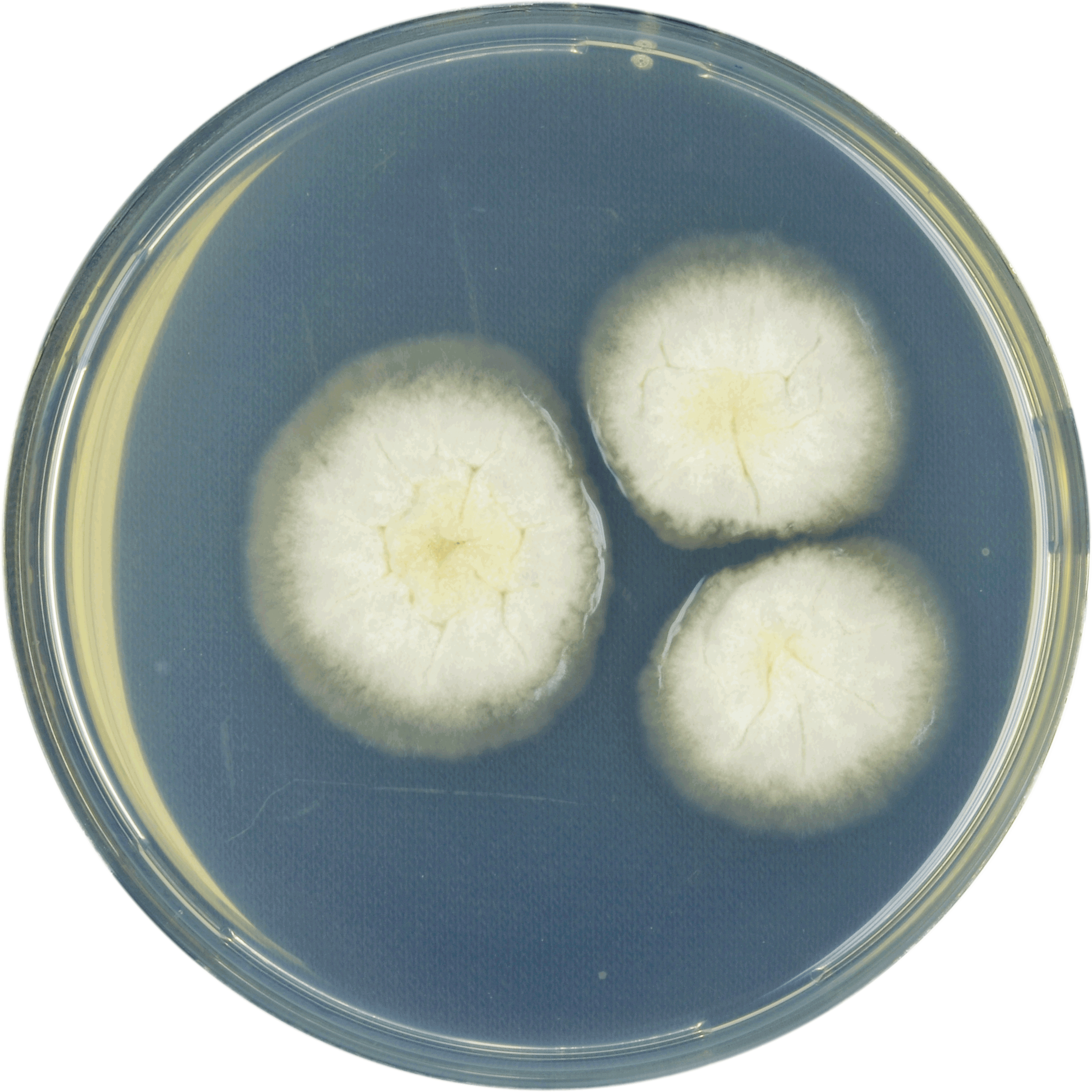
Aspergillus striatulus growing on CYA plate

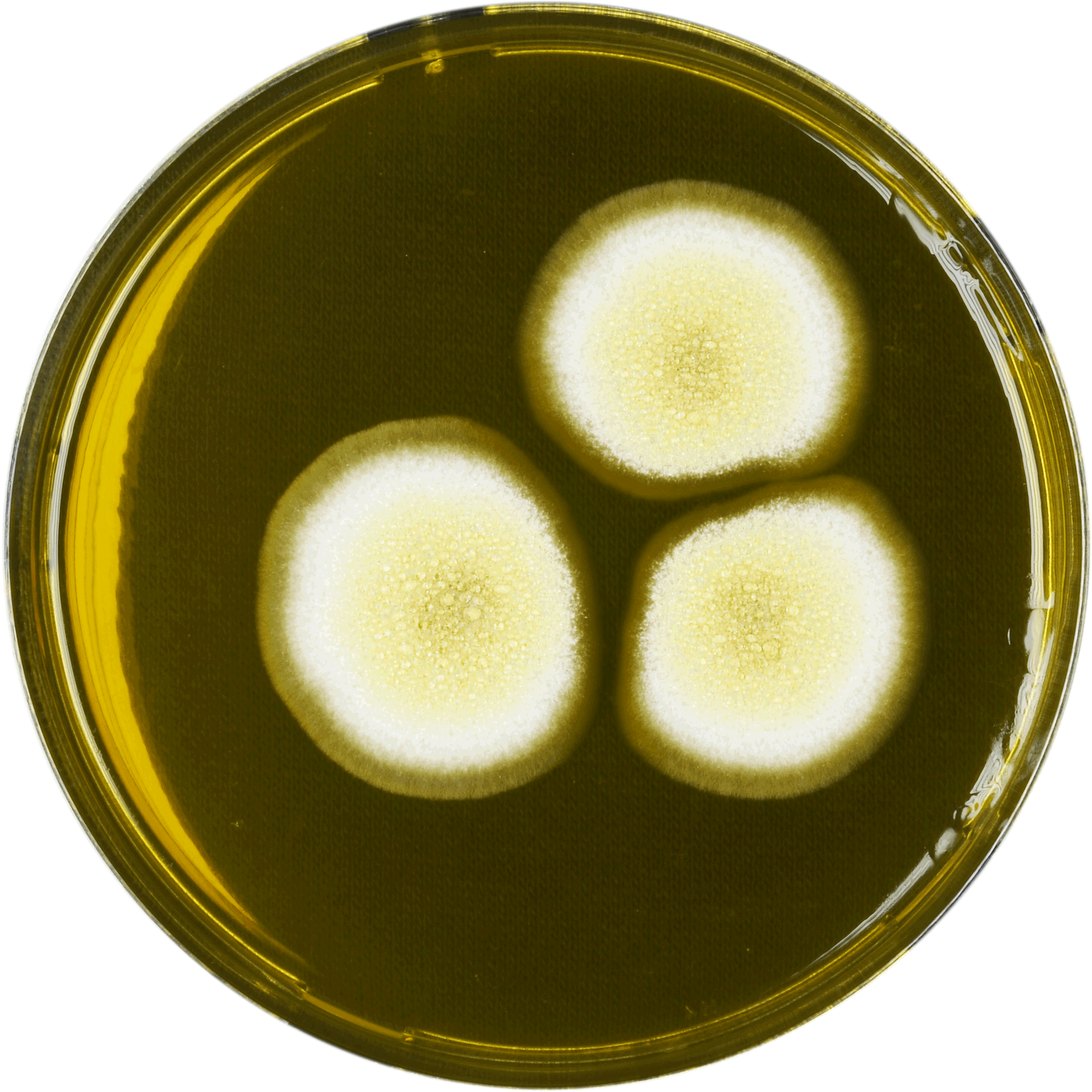
Aspergillus striatulus growing on MEAOX plate
