= Paxillin =

Protein found in humans

PXN
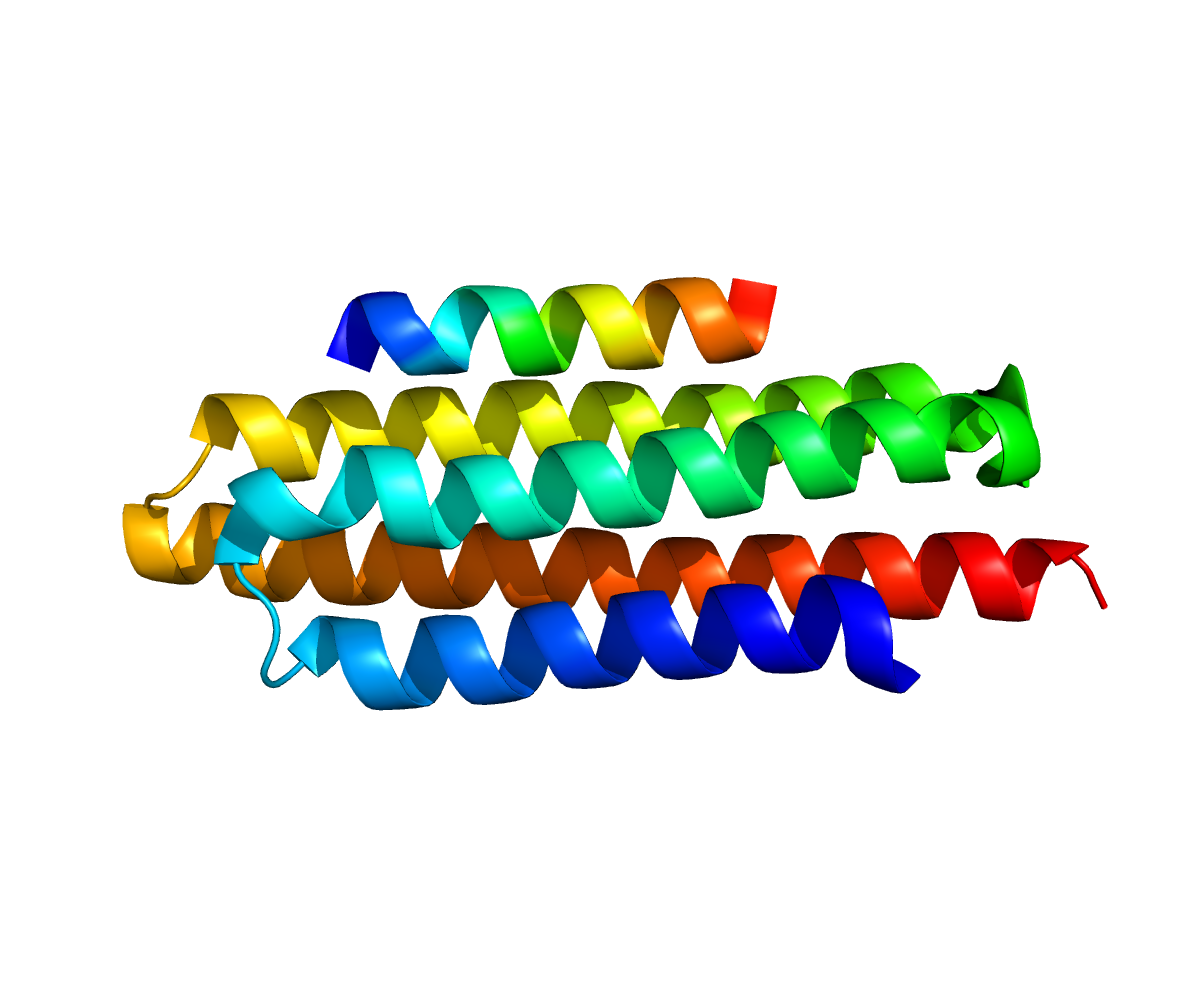

Identifiers
- Aliases: PXN, entrez:5829, paxillin
- External IDs: OMIM: 602505; MGI: 108295; GeneCards: PXN
Available structures
PDB	Ortholog search: PDBe RCSB
PDB	List of PDB id codes 2O9V, 2VZD, 2VZG, 2VZI, 3GM1, 3PY7, 3U3F, 4EDN, 1OW6, 1OW7, 1OW8, 3RQE, 3RQF, 3RQG, 4XGZ, 4XH2

Gene location (Human)
Chr.	Chromosome 12 (human)
Band	12q24.23	Start	120,210,439 bp
Band	12q24.23	End	120,265,771 bp

Gene location (Mouse)
Chr.	Chromosome 5 (mouse)
Band	5 F|5 56.1 cM	Start	115,644,735 bp
Band	5 F|5 56.1 cM	End	115,694,046 bp
RNA expression pattern
Bgee	Human / Mouse (ortholog); Top expressed in: granulocyte; tibial nerve; left uterine tube; apex of heart; gastrocnemius muscle; canal of the cervix; muscle layer of sigmoid colon; upper lobe of left lung; body of uterus; transverse colon / Top expressed in: granulocyte; vestibular membrane of cochlear duct; internal carotid artery; external carotid artery; endothelial cell of lymphatic vessel; retinal pigment epithelium; right lung lobe; left lung; tibiofemoral joint; stria vascularis; More reference expression data
BioGPS	n/a
Gene ontology
Molecular function	beta-catenin binding; vinculin binding; protein-containing complex binding; metal ion binding; integrin binding; protein binding; protein kinase binding; ubiquitin protein ligase binding; neuropilin binding; protein phosphatase binding; transcription coregulator activity
Cellular component	focal adhesion; plasma membrane; stress fiber; microtubule associated complex; cell junction; cell cortex; cytoskeleton; lamellipodium; cytoplasm; cytosol; adherens junction
Biological process	muscle contraction; epidermal growth factor receptor signaling pathway; signal complex assembly; cellular response to reactive oxygen species; vascular endothelial growth factor receptor signaling pathway; cell adhesion; growth hormone receptor signaling pathway; cell-matrix adhesion; transforming growth factor beta receptor signaling pathway; signal transduction; response to peptide; endothelial cell migration; positive regulation of stress fiber assembly; substrate adhesion-dependent cell spreading; regulation of nucleic acid-templated transcription
Sources:Amigo / QuickGO
Orthologs
Databases	NCBI: entry; OMA: entry
Species	Human	Mouse
Entrez	5829	19303
Ensembl	ENSG00000089159	ENSMUSG00000029528
UniProt	P49023	Q8VI36
RefSeq (mRNA)	NM_001080855; NM_001243756; NM_002859; NM_025157; NM_001385981 NM_001385982; NM_001385983; NM_001385984; NM_001385985; NM_001385986; NM_001385987; NM_001385988; NM_001385989; NM_001385990	NM_011223; NM_133915
RefSeq (protein)	NP_001074324; NP_001230685; NP_002850; NP_079433	NP_035353; NP_598676; NP_001389995; NP_001389996; NP_001389997 NP_001389998; NP_001389999
Location (UCSC)	Chr 12: 120.21 – 120.27 Mb	Chr 5: 115.64 – 115.69 Mb
PubMed search
- Wikidata
View/Edit Human	View/Edit Mouse

Paxillin is a protein that in humans is encoded by the PXN gene. Paxillin is expressed at focal adhesions of non-striated cells and at costameres of striated muscle cells, and it functions to adhere cells to the extracellular matrix. Mutations in PXN as well as abnormal expression of paxillin protein has been implicated in the progression of various cancers.

== Structure ==
Human paxillin is 64.5 kDa in molecular weight and 591 amino acids in length.

The C-terminal region of paxillin is composed of four tandem double zinc finger LIM domains that are cysteine/histidine-rich with conserved repeats; these serve as binding sites for the protein tyrosine phosphatase-PEST, tubulin and serves as the targeting motif for focal adhesions.

The N-terminal region of paxillin has five highly conserved leucine-rich sequences termed LD motifs, which mediate several interactions, including that with pp125FAK and vinculin. The LD motifs are predicted to form amphipathic alpha helices, with each leucine residue positioned on one face of the alpha helix to form a hydrophobic protein-binding interface. The N-terminal region also has a proline-rich domain that has potential for Src-SH3 binding. Three N-terminal YXXP motifs may serve as binding sites for talin or v-Crk SH2.

== Function ==
Paxillin is a signal transduction adaptor protein discovered in 1990 in the laboratory of Keith Burridge The C-terminal region of paxillin contains four LIM domains that target paxillin to focal adhesions. It is presumed through a direct association with the cytoplasmic tail of beta-integrin. The N-terminal region of paxillin is rich in protein–protein interaction sites. The proteins that bind to paxillin are diverse and include protein tyrosine kinases, such as Src and focal adhesion kinase (FAK), structural proteins, such as vinculin and actopaxin, and regulators of actin organization, such as COOL/PIX and PKL/GIT. Paxillin is tyrosine-phosphorylated by FAK and Src upon integrin engagement or growth factor stimulation, creating binding sites for the adapter protein Crk.

In striated muscle cells, paxillin is important in costamerogenesis, or the formation of costameres, which are specialized focal adhesion–like structures in muscle cells that tether Z-disc structures across the sarcolemma to the extracellular matrix. The current working model of costamerogenesis is that in cultured, undifferentiated myoblasts, alpha-5 integrin, vinculin and paxillin are in complex and located primarily at focal adhesions. During early differentiation, premyofibril formation through sarcomerogenesis occurs, and premyofibrils assemble at structures that are typical of focal adhesions in non-muscle cells; a similar phenomenon is observed in cultured cardiomyocytes. Premyofibrils become nascent myofibrils, which progressively align to form mature myofibrils and nascent costamere structures appear. Costameric proteins redistribute to form mature costameres. While the precise functions of paxillin in this process are still being unveiled, studies investigating binding partners of paxillin have provided mechanistic understanding of its function. The proline-rich region of paxillin specifically binds to the second SH3 domain of ponsin, which occurs after the onset of the myogenic differentiation and with expression restricted to costameres. We also know that the binding of paxillin to FAK is critical for directing paxillin function. The phosphorylation of FAK at serine-910 regulates the interaction of FAK with paxillin, and controls the stability of paxillin at costameres in cardiomyocytes, with phosphorylation reducing the half-life of paxillin. This is important to understand because the stability of the FAK-paxillin interaction is likely inversely related to the stability of the vinculin-paxillin interaction, which would likely indicate the strength of the costamere interaction as well as sarcomere reorganization; processes which have been linked to dilated cardiomyopathy. Additional studies have shown that paxillin itself is phosphorylated, and this participates in hypertrophic signaling pathways in cardiomyocytes. Treatment of cardiomyocytes with the hypertrophic agonist, phenylephrine stimulated a rapid increase in tyrosine phosphorylation paxillin, which was mediated by protein tyrosine kinases.

The structural reorganization of paxillin in cardiomyocytes has also been detected in mouse models of dilated cardiomyopathy. In a mouse model of tropomodulin overexpression, paxillin distribution was revamped coordinate with increased phosphorylation and cleavage of paxillin. Similarly, paxillin was shown to have altered localization in cardiomyocytes from transgenic mice expressing a constitutively-active rac1. These data show that alterations in costameric organization, in part via paxillin redistribution, may be a pathogenic mechanism in dilated cardiomyopathy. In addition, in mice subjected to pressure overload-induced cardiac hypertrophy, inducing hypertrophic cardiomyopathy, paxillin expression levels increased, suggesting a role for paxillin in both types of cardiomyopathy.

== Clinical significance ==
Paxillin has been shown to have a clinically-significant role in patients with several cancer types. Enhanced expression of paxillin has been detected in premalignant areas of hyperplasia, squamous metaplasia and goblet cell metaplasia, as well as dysplastic lesions and carcinoma in high-risk patients with lung adenocarcinoma. Mutations in PXN have been associated with enhanced tumor growth, cell proliferation, and invasion in lung cancer tissues.

During tumor transformation, a consistent finding is that paxillin protein is recruited and phosphorylated. Paxillin plays a role in the MET tyrosine kinase signaling pathway, which is upregulated in many cancers.

== Interactions ==
Paxillin has been shown to interact with:

- PTP-PEST,
- tubulin,
- VCL,
- pp125FAK.
- SRC
- SORBS1.
- PARVA
- ILK and
- Talin
