= RSU1 =

Protein-coding gene in the species Homo sapiens

Identifiers
- Aliases: RSU1, RSP-1, Ras suppressor protein 1
- External IDs: OMIM: 179555; MGI: 103040; HomoloGene: 7521; GeneCards: RSU1; OMA:RSU1 - orthologs

Gene location (Human)
Chr.	Chromosome 10 (human)
Band	10p13	Start	16,590,611 bp
Band	10p13	End	16,817,463 bp

Gene location (Mouse)
Chr.	Chromosome 2 (mouse)
Band	2|2 A1	Start	13,081,632 bp
Band	2|2 A1	End	13,276,226 bp
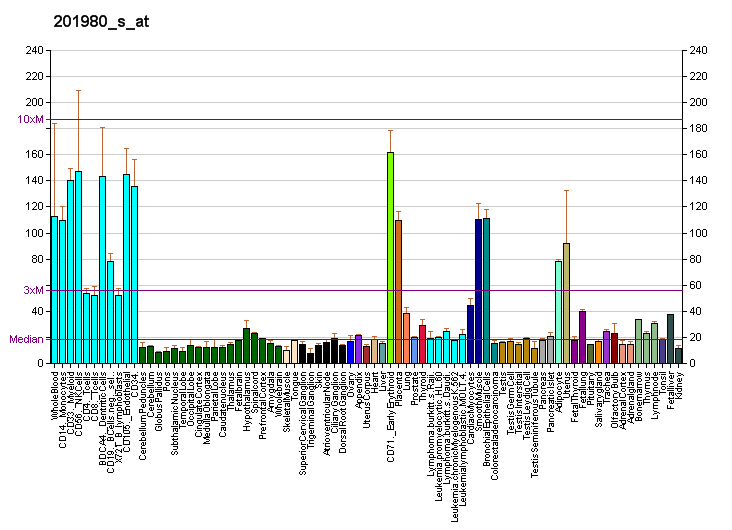
RNA expression pattern
Bgee	Human / Mouse (ortholog); Top expressed in: popliteal artery; tibial arteries; right coronary artery; left coronary artery; Descending thoracic aorta; ascending aorta; Achilles tendon; monocyte; saphenous vein; stromal cell of endometrium / Top expressed in: genital tubercle; granulocyte; ascending aorta; umbilical cord; calvaria; external carotid artery; tail of embryo; endothelial cell of lymphatic vessel; left lung lobe; right lung lobe; More reference expression data
BioGPS	More reference expression data
Gene ontology
Molecular function	protein binding
Cellular component	cytosol; extracellular exosome; focal adhesion
Biological process	positive regulation of GTPase activity; regulation of cell-substrate adhesion; signal transduction; positive regulation of cell-substrate adhesion
Sources:Amigo / QuickGO
Orthologs
Species	Human	Mouse
Entrez	6251	20163
Ensembl	ENSG00000148484	ENSMUSG00000026727
UniProt	Q15404	Q01730
RefSeq (mRNA)	NM_012425; NM_152724	NM_009105
RefSeq (protein)	NP_036557; NP_689937	n/a
Location (UCSC)	Chr 10: 16.59 – 16.82 Mb	Chr 2: 13.08 – 13.28 Mb
PubMed search
- Wikidata
View/Edit Human	View/Edit Mouse

Ras suppressor protein 1 is a protein that in humans is encoded by the RSU1 gene.

This gene encodes a protein that is involved in the Ras signal transduction pathway, growth inhibition, and nerve-growth factor induced differentiation processes, as determined in mouse and human cell line studies. In mouse, the encoded protein was initially isolated based on its ability to inhibit v-Ras transformation. Multiple alternatively spliced transcript variants for this gene have been reported; one of these variants was found only in glioma tumors. RSU-1 has also been seen to act as a structural protein in integrin-mediated focal-adhesion complexes. It bind strongly to the protein PINCH.
