= NEO1 =

Protein-coding gene in the species Homo sapiens

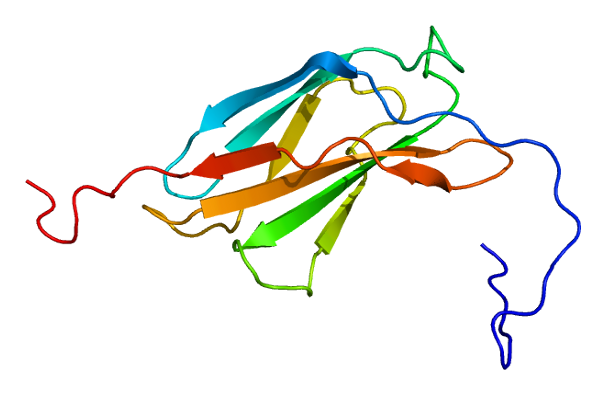

Identifiers
- Aliases: NEO1, IGDCC2, NGN, NTN1R2, neogenin 1
- External IDs: OMIM: 601907; MGI: 1097159; GeneCards: NEO1
Available structures
| PDB | Ortholog search: PDBe RCSB |
| PDB | List of PDB id codes 1X5F, 1X5G, 1X5H, 1X5I, 1X5J, 1X5K, 3P4L, 4UI2 |

Gene location (Human)
| Chr. | Chromosome 15 (human) |
| Band | 15q24.1 | Start | 73,051,710 bp |
| Band | 15q24.1 | End | 73,305,205 bp |

Gene location (Mouse)
| Chr. | Chromosome 9 (mouse) |
| Band | 9|9 B | Start | 58,781,970 bp |
| Band | 9|9 B | End | 58,943,724 bp |
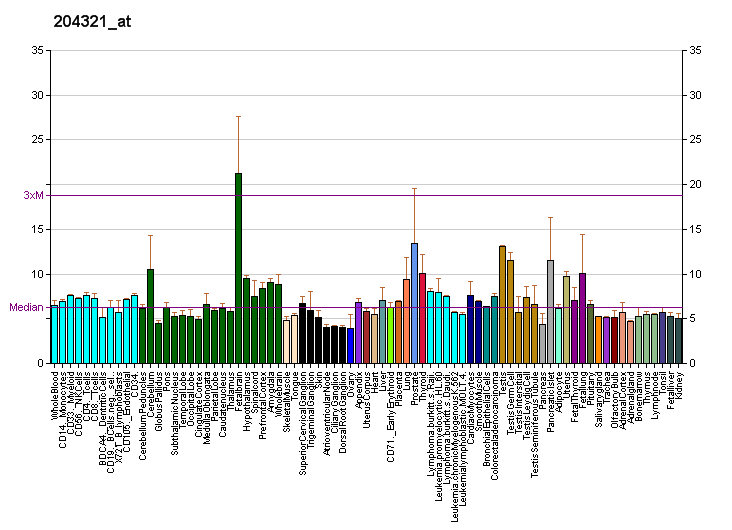
RNA expression pattern
| Bgee | Human / Mouse (ortholog); Top expressed in: ventricular zone; internal globus pallidus; inferior ganglion of vagus nerve; rectum; epithelium of colon; subthalamic nucleus; corpus callosum; ventral tegmental area; superior vestibular nucleus; pylorus / Top expressed in: external carotid artery; internal carotid artery; epithelium of lens; renal corpuscle; medullary collecting duct; substantia nigra; ciliary body; ascending aorta; Rostral migratory stream; aortic valve; More reference expression data |
| BioGPS | More reference expression data |
Gene ontology
| Molecular function | co-receptor binding; protein binding; signaling receptor activity |
| Cellular component | integral component of membrane; plasma membrane protein complex; plasma membrane; Golgi apparatus; integral component of plasma membrane; membrane; nucleoplasm |
| Biological process | positive regulation of BMP signaling pathway; iron ion homeostasis; cell adhesion; nervous system development; axon guidance; signal transduction |
Sources:Amigo / QuickGO
Orthologs
| Databases | NCBI: entry; OMA: entry |
| Species | Human | Mouse |
| Entrez | 4756 | 18007 |
| Ensembl | ENSG00000067141 | ENSMUSG00000032340 |
| UniProt | Q92859 | P97798 |
| RefSeq (mRNA) | NM_001172623; NM_001172624; NM_002499 | NM_001042752; NM_008684 |
| RefSeq (protein) | NP_001166094; NP_001166095; NP_002490 | n/a |
| Location (UCSC) | Chr 15: 73.05 – 73.31 Mb | Chr 9: 58.78 – 58.94 Mb |
| PubMed search |
- Wikidata
| View/Edit Human | View/Edit Mouse |

Neogenin is a protein that in humans is encoded by the NEO1 gene.

== Interactions ==
NEO1 has been shown to interact with PTK2. Also Neogenin receptor is pointed as a component of the mechanisms that determine skeletal cell fusion via RGMa (repulsive guidance molecule a) binding.
