= Calpain-2 =

Identifiers
- EC no.: 3.4.22.53
- CAS no.: 702693-80-9

Databases
- IntEnz: IntEnz view
- BRENDA: BRENDA entry
- ExPASy: NiceZyme view
- KEGG: KEGG entry
- MetaCyc: metabolic pathway
- PRIAM: profile
- PDB structures: RCSB PDB PDBe PDBsum
Search
- PMC: articles
- PubMed: articles
- NCBI: proteins

Calpain-2 (EC 3.4.22.53, calcium-activated neutral protease II, m-calpain, milli-calpain) is an intracellular heterodimeric calcium-activated cysteine protease. This enzyme catalyses the following chemical reaction

Broad endopeptidase specificity

This enzyme belongs to the peptidase family C2. It is one of 15 proteins in the calpain family.

== Structure ==
Calpain-2 is a heterodimer of a catalytic subunit encoded by CAPN2 gene and a regulatory subunit CAPNS1. The catalytic subunit consists of four domains: protease core 1 domain (PC1), protease core 2 domain (PC2), calpain-type beta-sandwich-like domain (CBSW), and penta EF-hand domain (PEF(L)). The catalytic cleft is formed by PC1 and PC2 upon calcium binding. The catalytic triad consists of residues C105, H262, and N286. Noteworthy, CAPN2 also contains an N-terminal anchor helix, which however is cleaved off upon protease activation. It is believed to play a role in a regulation of catalytic activity.

The regulatory subunit consists of two domains: a glycine-rich domain (GR), and penta EF-hand domain (PEF(S)). The interaction of PEF(S) and PEF(L) through an unpaired EF-hand motif causes dimerization of the two subunits. Calpain-2 heterodimer is highly homologous to calpain-1, which is formed by a catalytic CAPN1 and a regulatory CAPNS1 subunits.

== Properties ==
There is no known consensus sequence for calpain-2 proteolysis, but there is evidence for over 130 potential substrates. Proteolytic cleavage by calpain-2 is regulated by presence of Ca^{2+} ions. It requires supraphysiological (low millimolar) concentration of Ca^{2+} for activation. Intracellular concentration of Ca^{2+} (approx. 100 nM) is insufficient for activating calpain-2, so activation occurs upon influx of ions from extracellular space or from endoplasmic reticulum. In addition, calpain-1/2 can be inhibited by calpastatin (encoded by the CAST gene) which binds to the PEF domains of the catalytic and regulatory subunits of calpains-1/2. It prohibits substrate binding to the active site through steric hindrance.

== Calpain-2 in Cancer ==
Upregulation of calpain-2 is linked to increased aggressiveness of cancer. There is evidence suggesting that the mechanism of action is through cleavage of substrates involved in cell migration, invasion, and sensitivity to chemotherapeutic agents.

== Domain Nomenclature ==
Previously used nomenclature used Roman numerals to denote calpain-2 domains starting from the N-terminus of CAPN2 and ending at C-terminus of CAPNS1. For example, PEF(L) and PEF(S) were referred to as Domain IV and Domain VI, respectively.

== See also ==
- Calpain Research Portal
- CAPN2
- Crystal Structure of Human Calpain-2
