= PIP5K1C =

Protein-coding gene in the species Homo sapiens

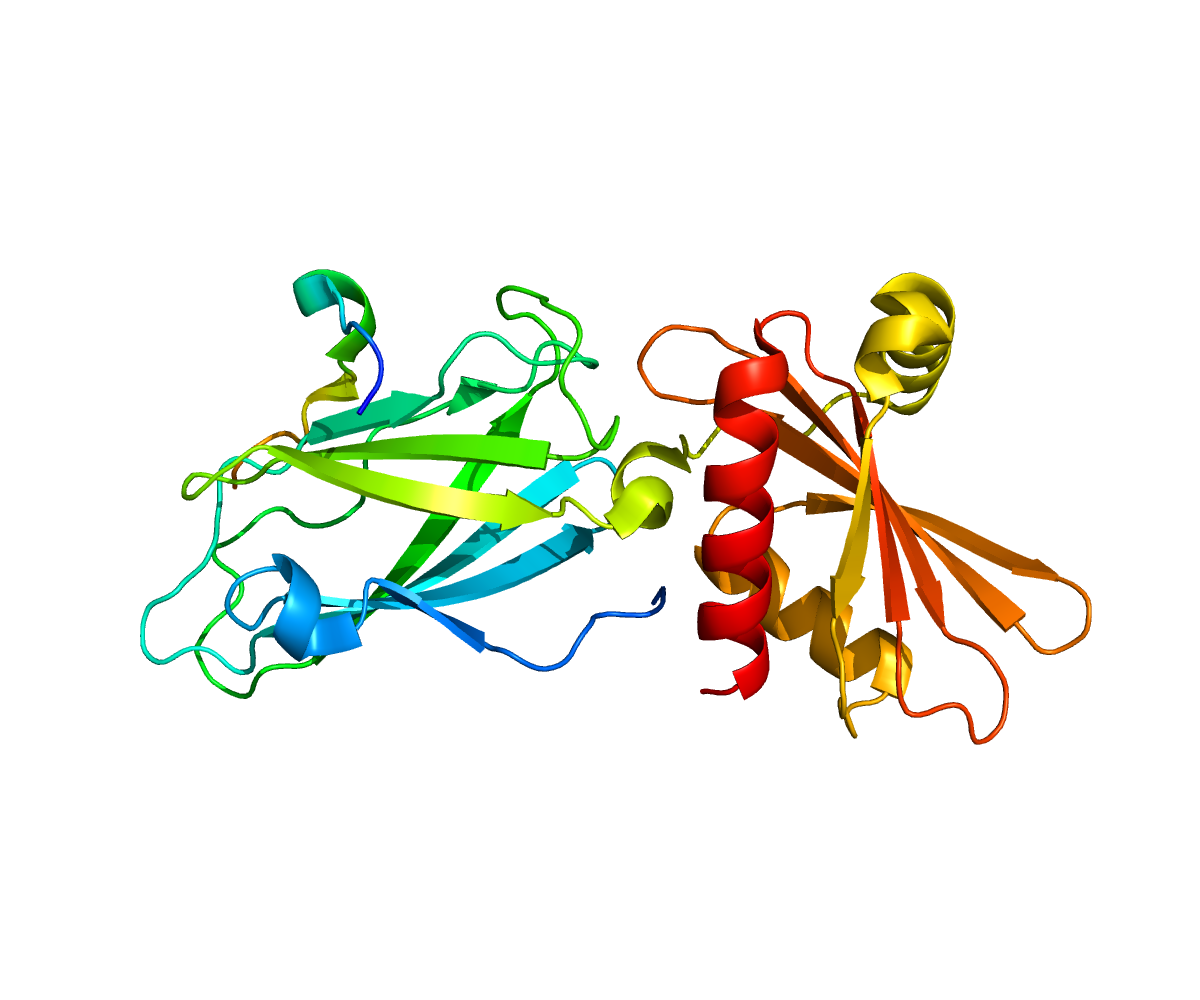

Identifiers
- Aliases: PIP5K1C, LCCS3, PIP5K-GAMMA, PIP5K1-gamma, PIP5Kgamma, phosphatidylinositol-4-phosphate 5-kinase type 1 gamma
- External IDs: OMIM: 606102; MGI: 1298224; GeneCards: PIP5K1C
Available structures
PDB	Ortholog search: PDBe RCSB
PDB	List of PDB id codes 2G35, 3H1Z, 3H85
Enzyme activity
EC #	BRENDA	ExPASy	KEGG	MetaCyc
2.7.1.68	↗	↗	↗	↗

Gene location (Human)
Chr.	Chromosome 19 (human)
Band	19p13.3	Start	3,630,183 bp
Band	19p13.3	End	3,700,468 bp

Gene location (Mouse)
Chr.	Chromosome 10 (mouse)
Band	10|10 C1	Start	81,292,963 bp
Band	10|10 C1	End	81,319,973 bp
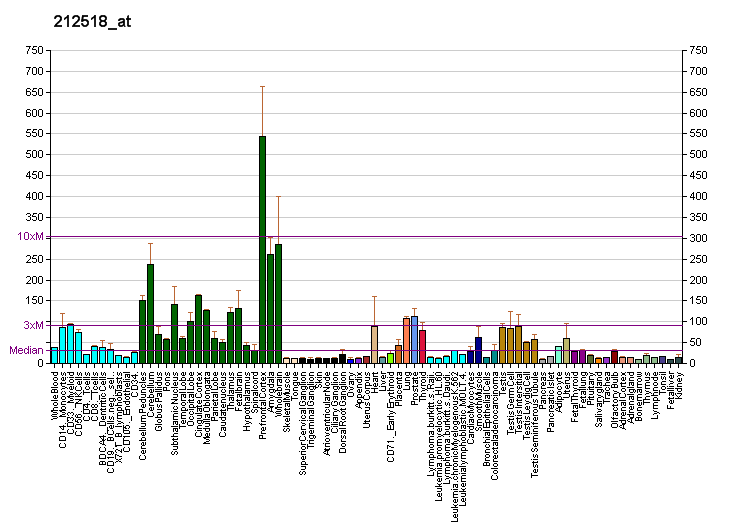
RNA expression pattern
Bgee	Human / Mouse (ortholog); Top expressed in: right hemisphere of cerebellum; decidua; Brodmann area 10; left testis; right testis; paraflocculus of cerebellum; right frontal lobe; cerebellar vermis; middle temporal gyrus; stromal cell of endometrium / Top expressed in: superior frontal gyrus; dentate gyrus of hippocampal formation granule cell; prefrontal cortex; cerebellar cortex; external carotid artery; internal carotid artery; primary visual cortex; Rostral migratory stream; granulocyte; neural layer of retina; More reference expression data
BioGPS	More reference expression data
Gene ontology
Molecular function	transferase activity; nucleotide binding; kinase activity; protein binding; phosphatidylinositol phosphate kinase activity; ATP binding; phosphatidylinositol-3,4-bisphosphate 5-kinase activity; 1-phosphatidylinositol-4-phosphate 5-kinase activity; 1-phosphatidylinositol-3-phosphate 4-kinase activity
Cellular component	cytoplasm; cell projection; membrane; focal adhesion; adherens junction; plasma membrane; ruffle membrane; cell junction; uropod; phagocytic cup; endomembrane system; nucleus; presynapse; synapse; nucleoplasm; cytosol; endosome membrane
Biological process	endocytosis; phosphatidylinositol metabolic process; adherens junction assembly; phosphorylation; synaptic vesicle exocytosis; neutrophil chemotaxis; chemotaxis; clathrin-dependent endocytosis; phosphatidylinositol phosphate biosynthetic process; cell adhesion; synaptic vesicle endocytosis; phagocytosis; phosphatidylinositol biosynthetic process; actin cytoskeleton organization; exocytosis; regulation of phosphatidylinositol 3-kinase signaling; membrane organization; cell-cell adhesion
Sources:Amigo / QuickGO
Orthologs
Databases	NCBI: entry; OMA: entry
Species	Human	Mouse
Entrez	23396	18717
Ensembl	ENSG00000186111	ENSMUSG00000034902
UniProt	O60331	O70161
RefSeq (mRNA)	NM_001195733; NM_001300849; NM_012398	NM_001146687; NM_001293646; NM_001293647; NM_008844
RefSeq (protein)	NP_001182662; NP_001287778; NP_036530	NP_001140159; NP_001280575; NP_001280576; NP_032870
Location (UCSC)	Chr 19: 3.63 – 3.7 Mb	Chr 10: 81.29 – 81.32 Mb
PubMed search
- Wikidata
View/Edit Human	View/Edit Mouse

Phosphatidylinositol-4-phosphate 5-kinase type-1 gamma is an enzyme that in humans is encoded by the PIP5K1C gene.

This gene encodes a member of the type I phosphatidylinositol-4-phosphate 5-kinase family of enzymes. A similar protein in mice is found in synapses and focal adhesion plaques, and binds the FERM domain of talin through its C-terminus.
