= 1-phosphatidylinositol-4-phosphate 5-kinase =

Class of enzymes

Identifiers
- EC no.: 2.7.1.68
- CAS no.: 104645-76-3

Databases
- IntEnz: IntEnz view
- BRENDA: BRENDA entry
- ExPASy: NiceZyme view
- KEGG: KEGG entry
- MetaCyc: metabolic pathway
- PRIAM: profile
- PDB structures: RCSB PDB PDBe PDBsum
- Gene Ontology: AmiGO / QuickGO
Search
- PMC: articles
- PubMed: articles
- NCBI: proteins

In enzymology, 1-phosphatidylinositol-4-phosphate 5-kinase (EC 2.7.1.68) is an enzyme that catalyzes the chemical reaction

ATP + 1-phosphatidyl-1D-myo-inositol 4-phosphate $\rightleftharpoons$ ADP + 1-phosphatidyl-1D-myo-inositol 4,5-bisphosphate

Thus, the two substrates of this enzyme are ATP and 1-phosphatidyl-1D-myo-inositol 4-phosphate, whereas its two products are ADP and 1-phosphatidyl-1D-myo-inositol 4,5-bisphosphate.

This enzyme belongs to the family of transferases, specifically those transferring phosphorus-containing groups (phosphotransferases) with an alcohol group as acceptor. The systematic name of this enzyme class is ATP:1-phosphatidyl-1D-myo-inositol-4-phosphate 5-phosphotransferase. Other names in common use include diphosphoinositide kinase, PIP kinase, phosphatidylinositol 4-phosphate kinase, phosphatidylinositol-4-phosphate 5-kinase, and type I PIP kinase. This enzyme participates in 3 metabolic pathways: inositol phosphate metabolism, phosphatidylinositol signaling system, and regulation of the actin cytoskeleton.

== Structural studies ==
As of late 2007, two structures have been solved for this class of enzymes, with PDB accession codes 1BO1 and 2GK9.
