= Talin (protein) =

Talin, middle domain

Identifiers
- Symbol: Talin_middle
- Pfam: PF09141
- InterPro: IPR015224
- SCOP2: 1sj7 / SCOPe / SUPFAM
Available protein structures:
- PDB: 1syqB:607–631 1sj7B:491–652 1sj8A:491–652 1t01B:605–628 IPR015224 PF09141 (ECOD; PDBsum)
- AlphaFold: IPR015224; PF09141

talin 1

Identifiers
- Symbol: TLN1
- Alt. symbols: TLN
- NCBI gene: 7094
- HGNC: 11845
- OMIM: 186745
- RefSeq: NM_006289
- UniProt: Q9Y490

Other data
- Locus: Chr. 9 p23-p21
Search for
- Structures: Swiss-model
- Domains: InterPro

talin 2

Identifiers
- Symbol: TLN2
- NCBI gene: 83660
- HGNC: 15447
- OMIM: 607349
- RefSeq: NM_015059
- UniProt: Q9Y4G6

Other data
- Locus: Chr. 15 q15-q21
Search for
- Structures: Swiss-model
- Domains: InterPro

Talin is a high-molecular-weight cytoskeletal protein concentrated at regions of cell–substratum contact and, in lymphocytes, at cell–cell contacts. Discovered in 1983 by Keith Burridge and colleagues, talin is a ubiquitous cytosolic protein that is found in high concentrations in focal adhesions. It is capable of linking integrins to the actin cytoskeleton either directly or indirectly by interacting with vinculin and α-actinin.

Also, talin-1 drives extravasation mechanism through engineered human microvasculature in microfluidic systems. Talin-1 is involved in each part of extravasation affecting adhesion, trans-endothelial migration and the invasion stages.

Integrin receptors are involved in the attachment of adherent cells to the extracellular matrix and of lymphocytes to other cells. In these situations, talin codistributes with concentrations of integrins in the plasma membrane. Furthermore, in vitro binding studies suggest that integrins bind to talin, although with low affinity. Talin also binds with high affinity to vinculin, another cytoskeletal protein concentrated at points of cell adhesion. Finally, talin is a substrate for the calcium-ion activated protease, calpain II, which is also concentrated at points of cell–substratum contact.

Talin is a mechanosensitive protein. Its mechanical vulnerability and cellular position bridging integrin receptors and the actin cytoskeleton make it a fundamental protein in mechanotransduction. Mechanical stretching of talin promotes vinculin binding.

== Protein domains ==
Talin consists of a large C-terminal rod domain that contains bundles of alpha helices and an N-terminal FERM (band 4.1, ezrin, radixin, and moesin) domain with three subdomains: F1, F2, and F3. The F3 subdomain of the FERM domain contains the highest affinity integrin-binding site for integrin β tails and is sufficient to activate integrins.

=== Middle domain ===
==== Structure ====
Talin also has a middle domain, which has a structure consisting of five alpha helices that fold into a bundle. It contains a vinculin binding site (VBS) composed of a hydrophobic surface spanning five turns of helix four.

==== Function ====
Activation of the VBS leads to the recruitment of vinculin to form a complex with the integrins which aids stable cell adhesion. Formation of the complex between VBS and vinculin requires prior unfolding of this middle domain: once released from the talin hydrophobic core, the VBS helix is then available to induce the 'bundle conversion' conformational change within the vinculin head domain thereby displacing the intramolecular interaction with the vinculin tail, allowing vinculin to bind actin.

Talin carries mechanical force (of 7-10 piconewton) during cell adhesion. It also allows cells to measure extracellular rigidity, since cells in which talin is prevented from forming mechanical linkages can no longer distinguish whether they are on a soft or rigid surface. The actin binding site2 is shown to be the major site for sensing the extracellular matrix rigidity. Recently Kumar et al combined cellular electron cryo-tomography with FRET based tension measurements and find that the regions of high talin tension within focal adhesion have highly aligned and linear underlying filamentous actin structures while regions of low talin tension have less well-aligned actin filaments.

=== Vinculin binding site ===
VBS
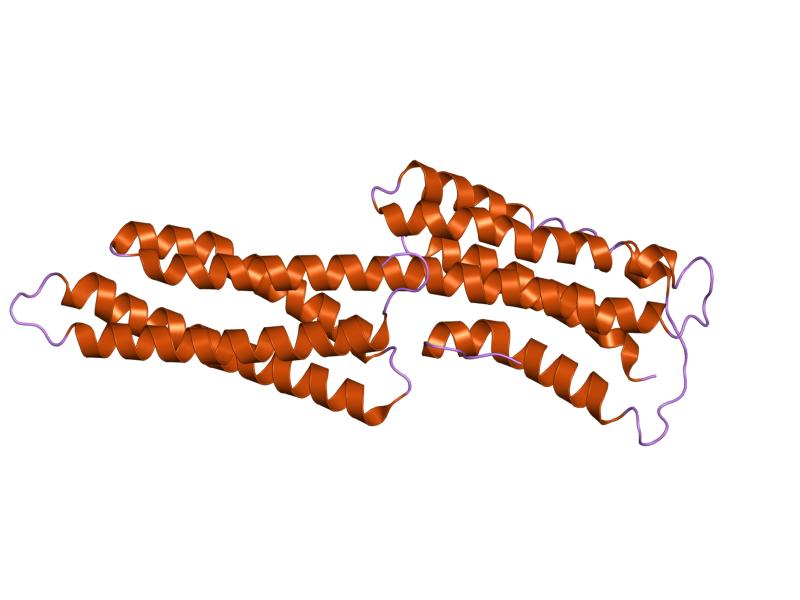
- human vinculin head (1-258) in complex with talin's vinculin binding site 3 (residues 1944-1969)

Identifiers
- Symbol: VBS
- Pfam: PF08913
- InterPro: IPR015009
Available protein structures:
- PDB: IPR015009 PF08913 (ECOD; PDBsum)
- AlphaFold: IPR015009; PF08913

==== Function ====
Vinculin binding sites are protein domains predominantly found in talin and talin-like molecules, enabling binding of vinculin to talin, stabilising integrin-mediated cell-matrix junctions. Talin, in turn, links integrins to the actin cytoskeleton.

==== Structure ====
The consensus sequence for vinculin binding sites is LxxAAxxVAxxVxxLIxxA, with a secondary structure prediction of four amphipathic helices. The hydrophobic residues that define the VBS are themselves 'masked' and are buried in the core of a series of helical bundles that make up the talin rod.

== Activation of the integrin α_{IIb}β_{3} ==
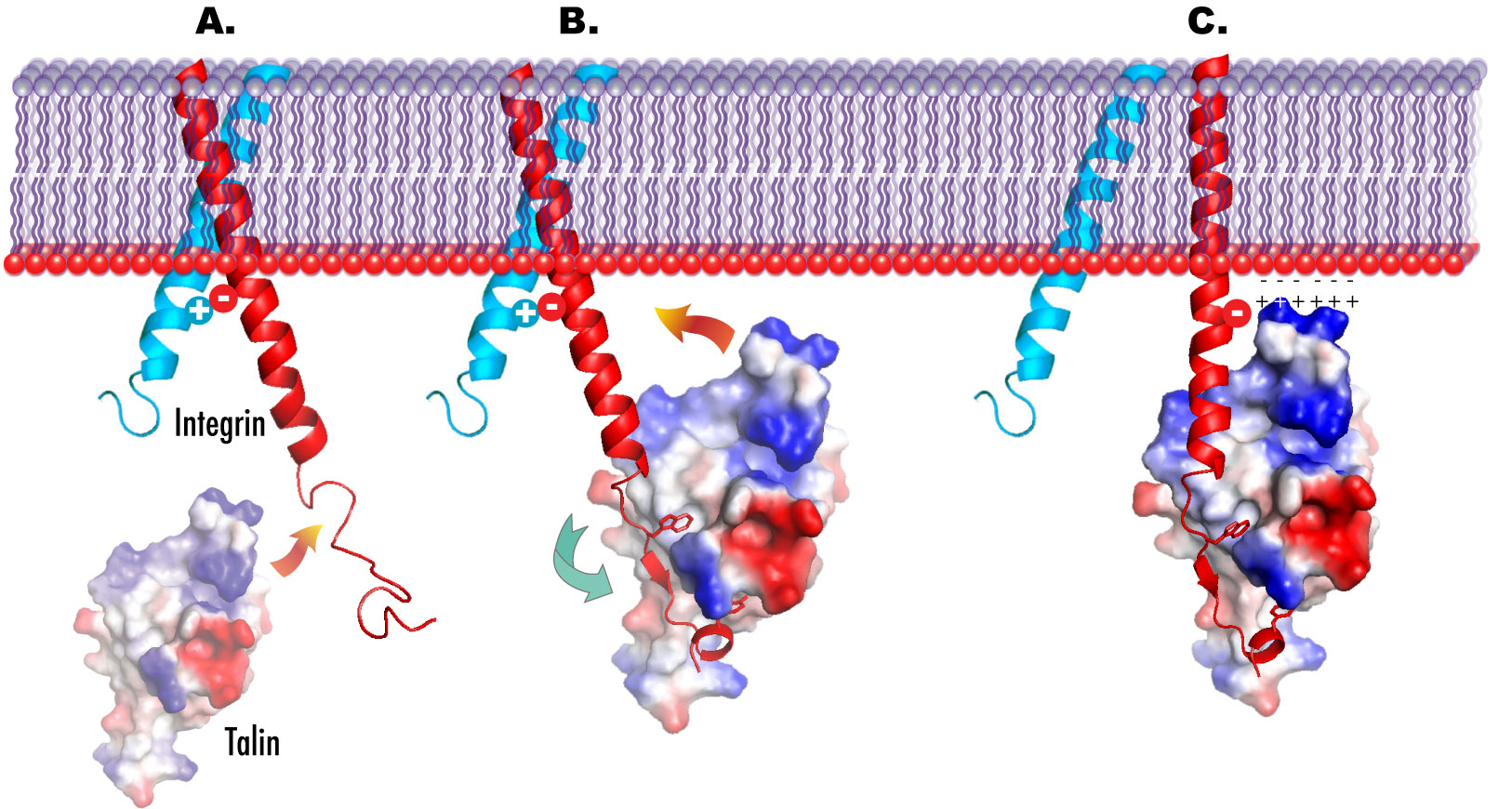
Model of talin-induced integrin activation

A structure–function analysis reported in 2007 provides a cogent structural model (see top right) to explain talin-dependent integrin activation in three steps:

1. The talin F3 domain (surface representation; colored by charge), freed from its autoinhibitory interactions in the full-length protein, becomes available for binding to the integrin.
2. F3 engages the membrane-distal part of the β3-integrin tail (in red), which becomes ordered, but the α–β integrin interactions that hold the integrin in the low-affinity conformation remain intact.
3. In a subsequent step, F3 engages the membrane-proximal portion of the β3 tail while maintaining its membrane–distal interactions.

== Human proteins containing this domain ==
TLN1; TLN2;

== See also ==
- Actin-binding protein
- Merlin (protein) an acronym for "Moesin-Ezrin-Radixin-Like Protein"
