= Vinculin =

Mammalian protein found in humans

VCL
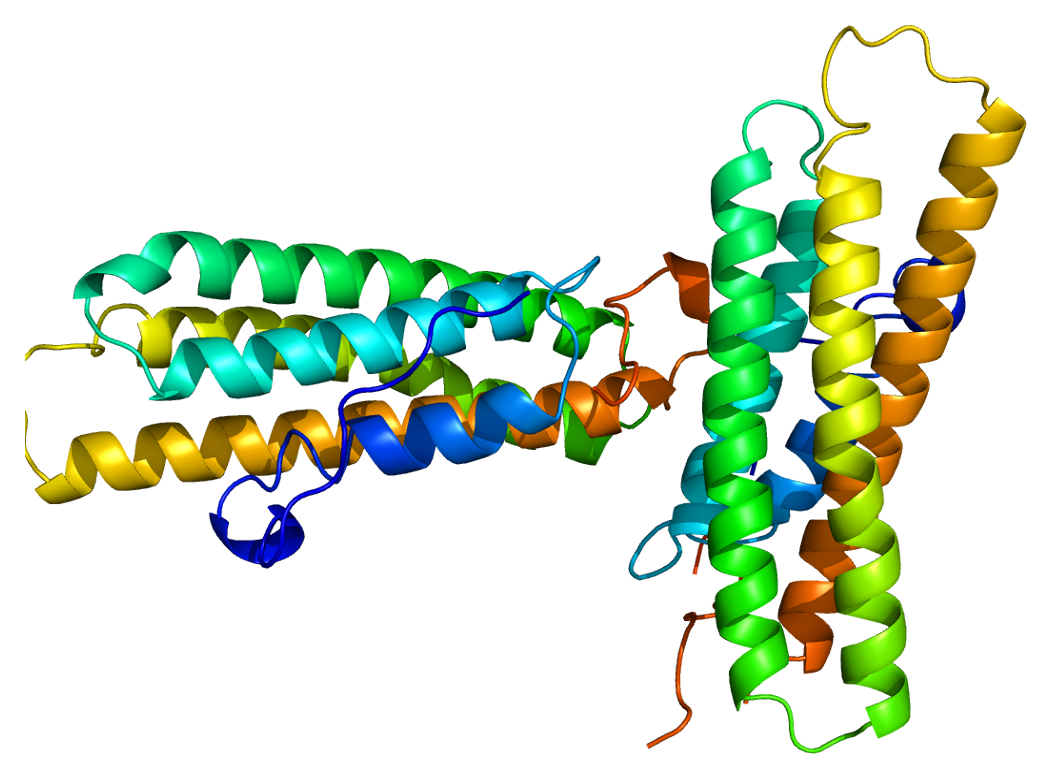

Identifiers
- Aliases: VCL, CMD1W, CMH15, HEL114, MV, Mvinculin
- External IDs: OMIM: 193065; MGI: 98927; GeneCards: VCL
Available structures
PDB	Ortholog search: PDBe RCSB
PDB	List of PDB id codes 1RKC, 1RKE, 1SYQ, 1TR2, 2GWW, 2IBF, 3H2U, 3H2V, 3MYI, 3TJ5, 3TJ6, 3VF0, 4DJ9, 4EHP, 1YDI, 2HSQ, 3RF3, 3S90, 4LN2, 4LNP, 4PR9, 3JBK

Gene location (Human)
Chr.	Chromosome 10 (human)
Band	10q22.2	Start	73,995,193 bp
Band	10q22.2	End	74,121,363 bp

Gene location (Mouse)
Chr.	Chromosome 14 (mouse)
Band	14 A3|14 11.53 cM	Start	20,979,466 bp
Band	14 A3|14 11.53 cM	End	21,083,744 bp
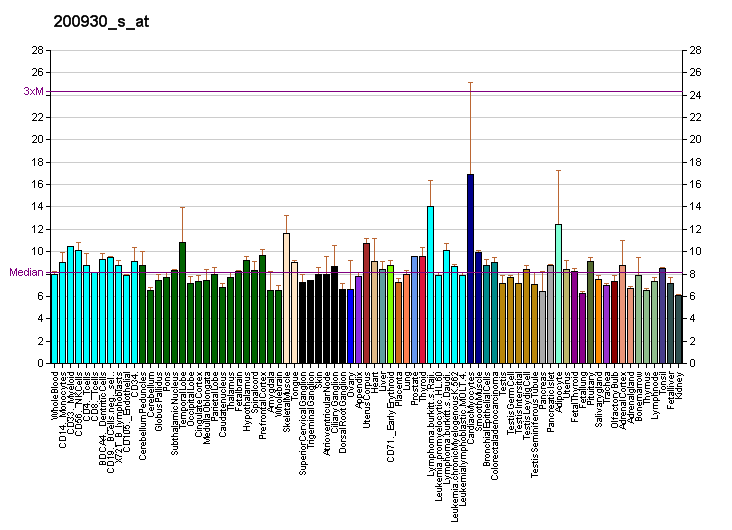

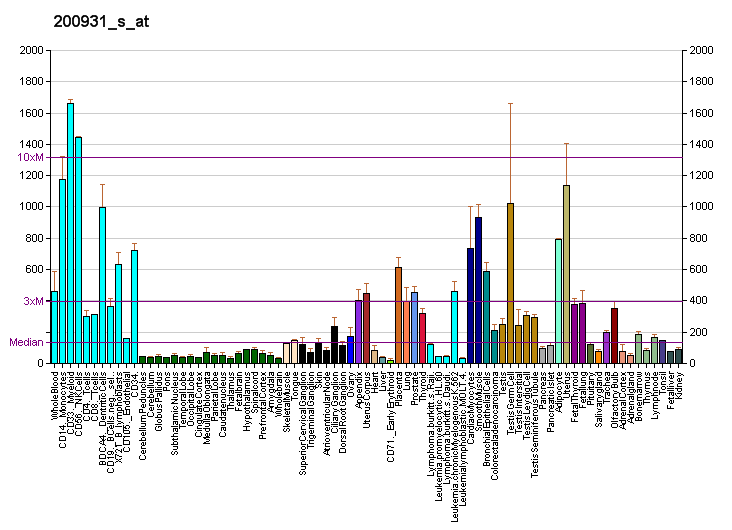
RNA expression pattern
Bgee	Human / Mouse (ortholog); Top expressed in: saphenous vein; urethra; vena cava; smooth muscle tissue; right coronary artery; popliteal artery; tibial arteries; nipple; seminal vesicula; Descending thoracic aorta / Top expressed in: tunica media of zone of aorta; calvaria; endothelial cell of lymphatic vessel; tibiofemoral joint; umbilical cord; ascending aorta; right lung; left lung; carotid body; left lung lobe; More reference expression data
BioGPS	More reference expression data
Gene ontology
Molecular function	beta-catenin binding; dystroglycan binding; structural molecule activity; protein binding; actin binding; alpha-catenin binding; ubiquitin protein ligase binding; cadherin binding
Cellular component	cytoplasm; extracellular vesicle; cytosol; outer dense plaque of desmosome; membrane; cell-cell junction; focal adhesion; cell-substrate junction; adherens junction; plasma membrane; inner dense plaque of desmosome; terminal web; extracellular region; cell junction; brush border; actin cytoskeleton; zonula adherens; membrane raft; fascia adherens; costamere; cytoskeleton; extracellular exosome; podosome; secretory granule lumen; specific granule lumen; ficolin-1-rich granule lumen; sarcolemma
Biological process	regulation of cell migration; muscle contraction; adherens junction assembly; epithelial cell-cell adhesion; platelet degranulation; morphogenesis of an epithelium; cell adhesion; negative regulation of cell migration; protein localization to cell surface; axon extension; cell-matrix adhesion; platelet aggregation; apical junction assembly; lamellipodium assembly; neutrophil degranulation
Sources:Amigo / QuickGO
Orthologs
Databases	NCBI: entry; OMA: entry
Species	Human	Mouse
Entrez	7414	22330
Ensembl	ENSG00000035403	ENSMUSG00000021823
UniProt	P18206	Q64727
RefSeq (mRNA)	NM_003373; NM_014000	NM_009502
RefSeq (protein)	NP_003364; NP_054706	NP_033528
Location (UCSC)	Chr 10: 74 – 74.12 Mb	Chr 14: 20.98 – 21.08 Mb
PubMed search
- Wikidata
View/Edit Human	View/Edit Mouse

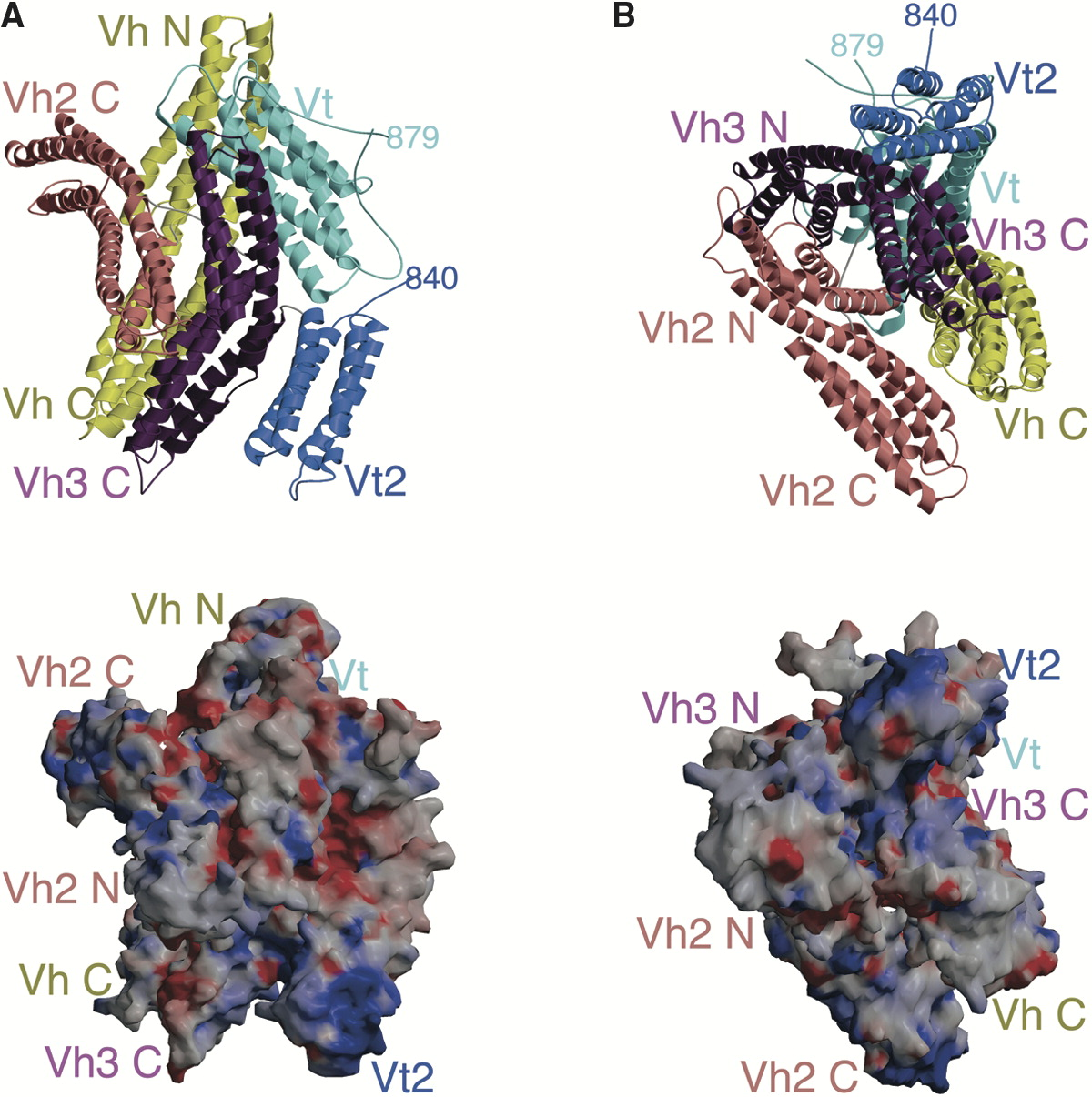
Vinculin is a globular protein approximately 115 x 85 x 65 angstroms in linear dimension.

In mammalian cells, vinculin is a membrane-cytoskeletal protein in focal adhesion plaques that is involved in linkage of integrin adhesion molecules to the actin cytoskeleton. Vinculin is a cytoskeletal protein associated with cell–cell and cell–matrix junctions, where it is thought to function as one of several interacting proteins involved in anchoring F-actin to the membrane.

Discovered independently by Benny Geiger and Keith Burridge, its sequence is 20–30% similar to α-catenin, which serves a similar function.

Binding alternately to talin or α-actinin, vinculin's shape and, as a consequence, its binding properties are changed. The vinculin gene occurs as a single copy and what appears to be no close relative to take over functions in its absence. Its splice variant metavinculin (see below) also needs vinculin to heterodimerize and work in a dependent fashion.

== Structure ==
Vinculin is a 117-kDa cytoskeletal protein with 1066 amino acids. The protein contains a basic N-terminal domain and an acidic C-terminal domain separated by a proline-rich middle segment. Vinculin consists of a globular head domain that contains binding sites for talin and α-actinin as well as a tyrosine phosphorylation site, while the tail region contains binding sites for F-actin, paxillin, and lipids.

Essentially, there is an 835 amino acid N-terminal head, which is split into four domains. This is linked to the C-terminal tail with a linker region.

The recent discovery of the 3D structure sheds light on how this protein tailors its shape to perform a variety of functions. For example, vinculin is able to control the cell's motility by simply altering its shape from active to inactive. When in its ‘inactive’ state, vinculin's conformation is characterized by the interaction between its head and tail domains. And, when transforming to the ‘active’ form, such as when talin triggers binding, the intramolecular interaction between the tail and head is severed. In other words, when talin's binding sites (VBS) of α-helices bind to a helical bundle structure in vinculin's head domain, the ‘helical bundle conversion’ is initiated, which leads to the reorganization of the α-helices (α1- α-4), resulting in an entirely new five-helical bundle structure. This function also extends to cancer cells, and regulating their movement and proliferation of cancer to other parts of the body.

== Mechanism and function ==
Cell spreading and movement occur through the process of binding of cell surface integrin receptors to extracellular matrix adhesion molecules. Vinculin is associated with focal adhesion and adherens junctions, resulting in significant protein dynamics. These are complexes that nucleate actin filaments and crosslinkers between the external medium, plasma membrane, and actin cytoskeleton. The complex at the focal adhesions consists of several proteins such as vinculin, α-actinin, paxillin, and talin, at the intracellular face of the plasma membrane.

In more specific terms, the amino-terminus of vinculin binds to talin, which, in turn, binds to β-integrins, and the carboxy-terminus binds to actin, phospholipids, and paxillin-forming homodimers. The binding of vinculin to talin and actin is regulated by polyphosphoinositides and inhibited by acidic phospholipids. The complex then serves to anchor actin filaments to the membrane and thus, helps to reinforce force on talin within the focal adhesions.

The loss of vinculin impacts a variety of cell functions; it disrupts the formation of the complex, and prevents cell adhesion and spreading. The absence of the protein demonstrates a decrease in spreading of cells, accompanied by reduced stress fiber formation, formation of fewer focal adhesions, and inhibition of lamellipodia extension. It was discovered that cells that are deficient in vinculin have growth cones that advance more slowly, as well as filopodia and lamellipodia that were less stable than the wild-type. Based on research, it has been postulated that the lack of vinculin may decrease cell adhesion by inhibiting focal adhesion assembly and preventing actin polymerization. On the other hand, overexpression of vinculin may restore adhesion and spreading by promoting recruitment of cytoskeletal proteins to the focal adhesion complex at the site of integrin binding. Vinculin's ability to interact with integrins to the cytoskeleton at the focal adhesion appears to be critical for control of cytoskeletal mechanics, cell spreading, and lamellipodia formation. Thus, vinculin appears to play a key role in shape control based on its ability to modulate focal adhesion structure and function.

== Activation ==
Vinculin is present in equilibrium between an active and inactive state. The active state is triggered upon binding to its designated partner. These changes occur when vinculin interacts with focal adhesion points to which it is binding to. When vinculin resides in its inactive form, the protein is kept designated to the cytoplasm unlike the focal adhesion points bound from the active state. The molecule talin is thought to be the major initiator of vinculin activation due to its presence in focal complexes. The combinatorial model of vinculin states that either α-actinin or talin can activate vinculin either alone or with the assistance of PIP_{2} or actin. This activation takes place by separation of the head-tail connection within inactive vinculin.

== Binding site ==
VBS
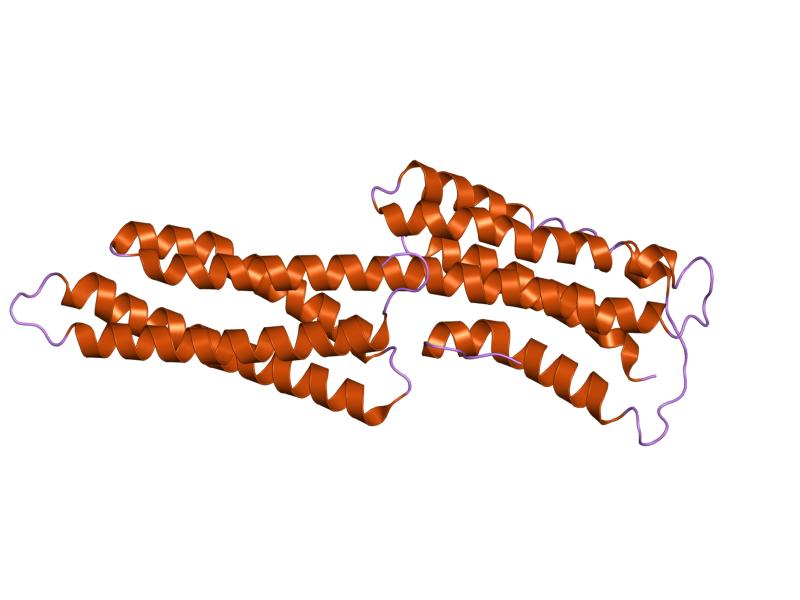
- Human vinculin head (1-258) in complex with talin's vinculin binding site 3 (residues 1944-1969)

Identifiers
- Symbol: VBS
- Pfam: PF08913
- InterPro: IPR015009
Available protein structures:
- PDB: IPR015009 PF08913 (ECOD; PDBsum)
- AlphaFold: IPR015009; PF08913

Vinculin binding sites are predominantly found in talin and talin-like molecules, enabling binding of vinculin to talin, stabilising integrin-mediated cell-matrix junctions. Talin, in turn, links integrins to the actin cytoskeleton. The consensus sequence for Vinculin binding sites is LxxAAxxVAxxVxxLIxxA, with a secondary structure prediction of four amphipathic helices. The hydrophobic residues that define the VBS are themselves 'masked' and are buried in the core of a series of helical bundles that make up the talin rod.

== Splice variants ==
Smooth muscles and skeletal muscles (and probably to a lower extent in cardiac muscle) in their well-differentiated (contractile) state co-express (along with vinculin) a splice variant carrying an extra exon in the 3' coding region, thus encoding a longer isoform meta-vinculin (meta VCL) of ~150KD molecular weight — a protein whose existence has been known since the 1980s. Translation of the extra exon causes a 68- to 79-amino acid acid-rich insert between helices I and II within the C-terminal tail domain. Mutations within the insert region correlate with hereditary idiopathic dilated cardiomyopathy.

The length of the insert in metavinculin is 68 amino acids in mammals and 79 amino acids in frog. Compared metavinculin sequences from pig, man, chicken, and frog, and found the insert to be bipartite: the first part variable and the second highly conserved. Both vinculin isoforms co-localize in muscular adhesive structures, such as dense plaques in smooth muscles, intercalated discs in cardiomyocytes, and costameres in skeletal muscles. Metavinculin tail domain has a lower affinity for the head as compared with the vinculin tail. In case of metavinculin, unfurling of the C-terminal hydrophobic hairpin loop of tail domain is impaired by the negative charges of the 68-amino acid insert, thus requiring phospholipid-activated regular isoform of vinculin to fully activate the metavinculin molecule.

== Interactions ==
Vinculin has been shown to interact with:

- CDH1,
- Paxillin, and
- SORBS1.

In cases of small intestinal bacterial overgrowth presented as IBS symptoms, anti-CdtB antibodies have been identified to affect vinculin function, which is required in gut motility.
