= Layilin =

Protein-coding gene in the species Homo sapiens

LAYN

Identifiers
- Aliases: LAYN, Layilin
- External IDs: MGI: 2685357; GeneCards: LAYN

Gene location (Human)
Chr.	Chromosome 11 (human)
Band	11q23.1	Start	111,540,280 bp
Band	11q23.1	End	111,561,745 bp

Gene location (Mouse)
Chr.	Chromosome 9 (mouse)
Band	9|9 A5.3	Start	50,965,940 bp
Band	9|9 A5.3	End	50,988,394 bp
RNA expression pattern
Bgee	Human / Mouse (ortholog); Top expressed in: decidua; stromal cell of endometrium; amniotic fluid; ascending aorta; pancreatic epithelial cell; Descending thoracic aorta; muscle layer of sigmoid colon; smooth muscle tissue; urethra; left ovary / Top expressed in: aortic valve; ascending aorta; endothelial cell of lymphatic vessel; embryo; embryo; facial motor nucleus; lens; blood; supraoptic nucleus; cumulus cell; More reference expression data
BioGPS	n/a
Orthologs
Databases	NCBI: entry; OMA: entry
Species	Human	Mouse
Entrez	143903	244864
Ensembl	ENSG00000204381	ENSMUSG00000060594
UniProt	Q6UX15	Q8C351
RefSeq (mRNA)	NM_001258390; NM_001258391; NM_178834; NM_001318799	NM_001033534
RefSeq (protein)	NP_001245319; NP_001245320; NP_001305728; NP_849156	NP_001028706
Location (UCSC)	Chr 11: 111.54 – 111.56 Mb	Chr 9: 50.97 – 50.99 Mb
PubMed search
- Wikidata
View/Edit Human	View/Edit Mouse

Layilin is a protein that in humans is encoded by the LAYN gene.

== Medical Relevance ==
A study has shown that Layilin is upregulated in tumor infiltrating CD8+ Cytotoxic T cells of patients with liver cancer.
