= Integrin beta 3 =

Mammalian protein found in Homo sapiens

ITGB3
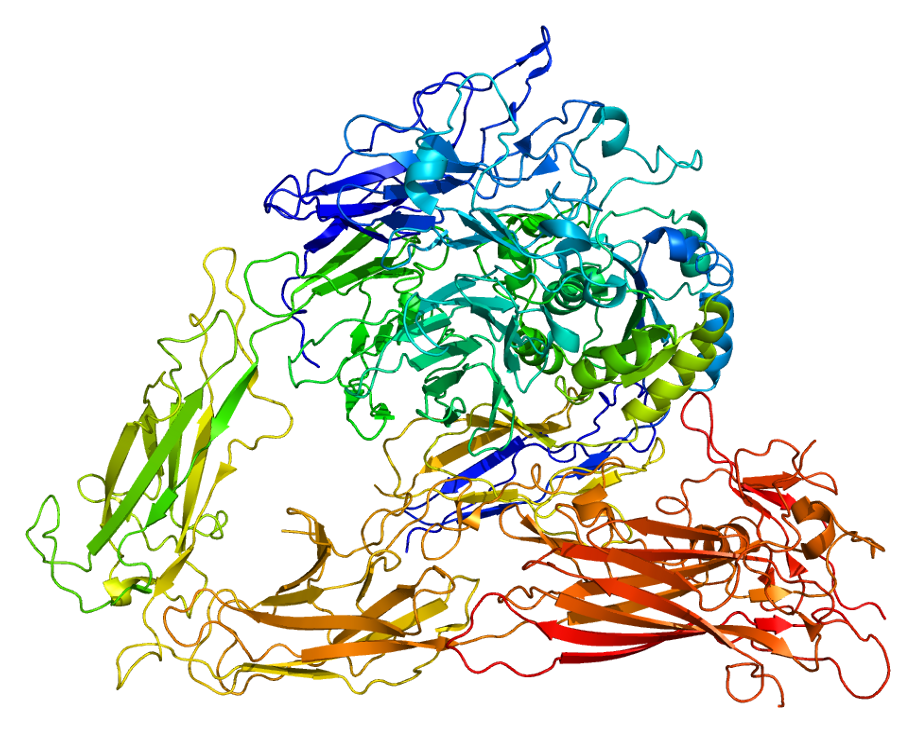

Identifiers
- Aliases: ITGB3, BDPLT16, BDPLT2, CD61, GP3A, GPIIIa, GT, integrin subunit beta 3, BDPLT24, GT2
- External IDs: OMIM: 173470; MGI: 96612; GeneCards: ITGB3
Available structures
PDB	Ortholog search: PDBe RCSB
PDB	List of PDB id codes 4O02, 1JV2, 1KUP, 1KUZ, 1L5G, 1M1X, 1M8O, 1MIZ, 1MK7, 1MK9, 1S4X, 1TYE, 1U8C, 2K9J, 2KNC, 2KV9, 2L1C, 2L91, 2LJD, 2LJE, 2LJF, 2MTP, 2Q6W, 2RMZ, 2RN0, 2VC2, 2VDK, 2VDL, 2VDM, 2VDN, 2VDP, 2VDQ, 2VDR, 3FCS, 3FCU, 3IJE, 3NID, 3NIF, 3NIG, 3T3M, 3T3P, 3ZDX, 3ZDY, 3ZDZ, 3ZE0, 3ZE1, 3ZE2, 4CAK, 4G1E, 4G1M, 4MMX, 4MMY, 4MMZ, 5HDB, 4Z7Q, 4Z7O, 4Z7N

Gene location (Human)
Chr.	Chromosome 17 (human)
Band	17q21.32	Start	47,253,827 bp
Band	17q21.32	End	47,313,743 bp

Gene location (Mouse)
Chr.	Chromosome 11 (mouse)
Band	11 E1|11 67.84 cM	Start	104,498,826 bp
Band	11 E1|11 67.84 cM	End	104,561,302 bp
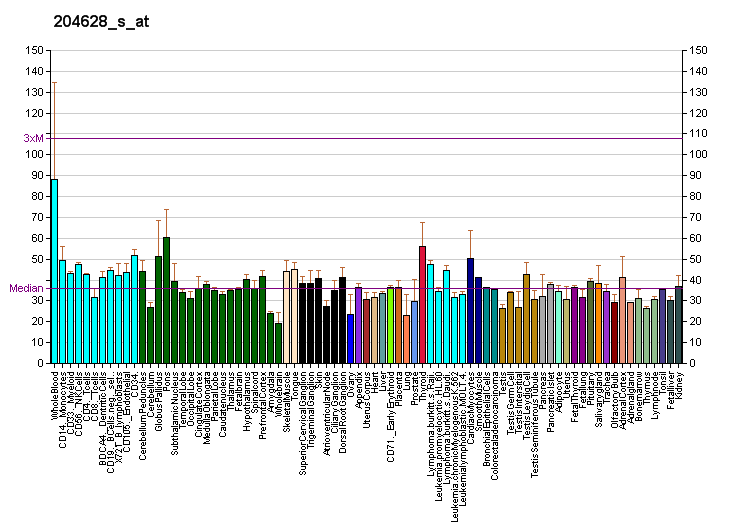

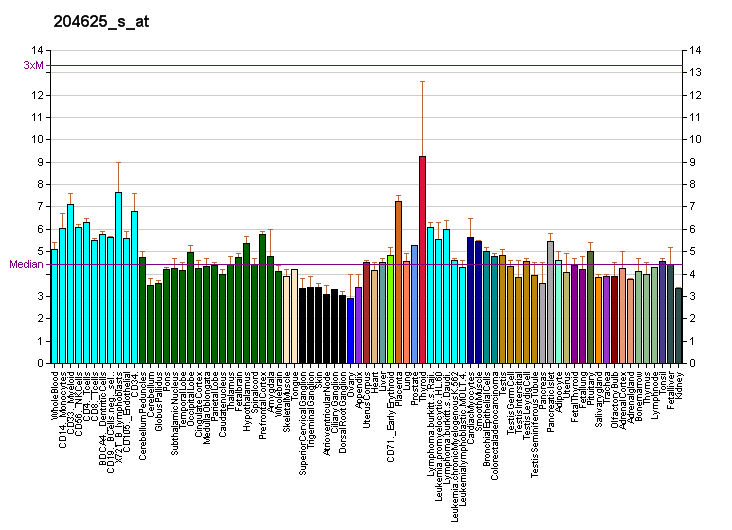

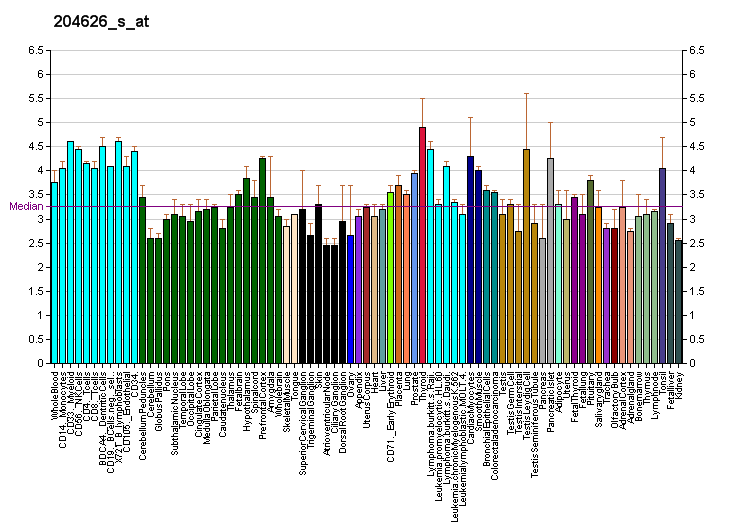
RNA expression pattern
Bgee	Human / Mouse (ortholog); Top expressed in: monocyte; thoracic aorta; ascending aorta; Descending thoracic aorta; right lobe of thyroid gland; left lobe of thyroid gland; tendon of biceps brachii; popliteal artery; tibial arteries; right coronary artery / Top expressed in: ascending aorta; aortic valve; decidua; blood; endothelial cell of lymphatic vessel; granulocyte; superior surface of tongue; femur; body of femur; zygote; More reference expression data
BioGPS	More reference expression data
Gene ontology
Molecular function	vascular endothelial growth factor receptor 2 binding; fibronectin binding; virus receptor activity; extracellular matrix binding; protein disulfide isomerase activity; protease binding; platelet-derived growth factor receptor binding; protein binding; identical protein binding; enzyme binding; cell adhesion molecule binding; neuregulin binding; coreceptor activity; fibroblast growth factor binding; insulin-like growth factor I binding; C-X3-C chemokine binding; integrin binding; fibrinogen binding
Cellular component	integral component of membrane; cell projection; alphav-beta3 integrin-vitronectin complex; membrane; focal adhesion; melanosome; receptor complex; plasma membrane; integral component of plasma membrane; ruffle membrane; cell surface; cell junction; integrin complex; platelet alpha granule membrane; integrin alphav-beta3 complex; extracellular exosome; lamellipodium membrane; nucleus; microvillus membrane; filopodium membrane; alphav-beta3 integrin-IGF-1-IGF1R complex; alphav-beta3 integrin-PKCalpha complex; alphav-beta3 integrin-HMGB1 complex; glutamatergic synapse; synapse
Biological process	negative regulation of lipoprotein metabolic process; apolipoprotein A-I-mediated signaling pathway; positive regulation of vascular endothelial growth factor receptor signaling pathway; positive regulation of protein phosphorylation; regulation of cell migration; negative chemotaxis; positive regulation of endothelial cell proliferation; tube development; heterotypic cell-cell adhesion; angiogenesis involved in wound healing; wound healing; platelet degranulation; blood coagulation; extracellular matrix organization; smooth muscle cell migration; positive regulation of endothelial cell migration; cell growth; cell-substrate adhesion; vascular endothelial growth factor receptor signaling pathway; cell adhesion; positive regulation of peptidyl-tyrosine phosphorylation; mesodermal cell differentiation; cell-substrate junction assembly; integrin-mediated signaling pathway; negative regulation of lipid storage; substrate adhesion-dependent cell spreading; negative regulation of lipid transport; cell-matrix adhesion; viral process; regulation of bone resorption; platelet aggregation; cell migration; negative regulation of macrophage derived foam cell differentiation; activation of protein kinase activity; leukocyte migration; cell adhesion mediated by integrin; platelet activation; apoptotic cell clearance; regulation of postsynaptic neurotransmitter receptor internalization; regulation of protein localization; regulation of serotonin uptake
Sources:Amigo / QuickGO
Orthologs
Databases	NCBI: entry; OMA: entry
Species	Human	Mouse
Entrez	3690	16416
Ensembl	ENSG00000259207	ENSMUSG00000020689
UniProt	P05106	O54890
RefSeq (mRNA)	NM_000212	NM_016780
RefSeq (protein)	NP_000203	NP_058060
Location (UCSC)	Chr 17: 47.25 – 47.31 Mb	Chr 11: 104.5 – 104.56 Mb
PubMed search
- Wikidata
View/Edit Human	View/Edit Mouse

Integrin beta-3 (β3) or CD61 is a protein that in humans is encoded by the ITGB3 gene. CD61 is a cluster of differentiation found on thrombocytes.

== Structure and function ==
The ITGB3 protein product is the integrin beta chain beta 3. Integrins are integral cell-surface proteins composed of an alpha chain and a beta chain. A given chain may combine with multiple partners resulting in different integrins. Integrin beta 3 is found along with the alpha IIb chain in platelets. Integrins are known to participate in cell adhesion as well as cell-surface-mediated signaling.

== Role in endometriosis ==
Defectively expressed β3 integrin subunit has been correlated with presence of endometriosis, and has been suggested as a putative marker of this condition.

== Interactions ==
CD61 has been shown to interact with PTK2, ITGB3BP, TLN1 and CIB1.

== See also ==
- Glycoprotein IIb/IIIa
