= Costamere =

Component of striated muscle cells

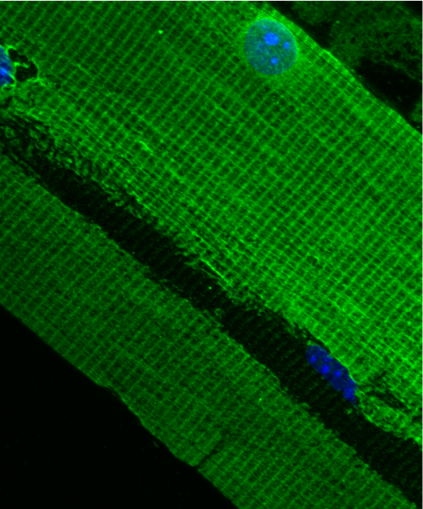
- Costamere structure in mouse quadriceps

Details
- Part of: Striated muscle

Identifiers
- Latin: costamerum
- MeSH: D054974
- TH: H2.00.05.2.01013

The costamere is a structural-functional component of striated muscle cells which connects the sarcomere of the muscle to the cell membrane (i.e. the sarcolemma).

Costameres are sub-sarcolemmal protein assemblies circumferentially aligned in register with the Z-disk of peripheral myofibrils. They physically couple force-generating sarcomeres with the sarcolemma in striated muscle cells and are thus considered one of several "Achilles' heels" of skeletal muscle, a critical component of striated muscle morphology which, when compromised, is thought to directly contribute to the development of several distinct myopathies.

The dystrophin-associated protein complex, also referred to as the dystrophin-associated glycoprotein complex (DGC or DAGC), contains various integral and peripheral membrane proteins such as dystroglycans and sarcoglycans, which are thought to be responsible for linking the internal cytoskeletal system of individual myofibers to structural proteins within the extracellular matrix (such as collagen and laminin). Therefore, it is one of the features of the sarcolemma which helps to couple the sarcomere to the extracellular connective tissue as some experiments have shown. Desmin protein may also bind to the DAG complex, and regions of it are known to be involved in signaling.

== Structure ==
Costameres are highly complex networks of proteins and glycoproteins, and can be considered as consisting of two major protein complexes: the dystrophin-glycoprotein complex (DGC) and the integrin-vinculin-talin complex. The sarcoglycans of the DGC and the integrins of the integrin-vinculin-talin complex attach directly to filamin C, a component of the Z-disk, linking these protein complexes of costameres to complexes of the Z-disk. Restated, filamin C physically links the two complexes that constitute the costamere to sarcomeres by interacting with the sarcoglycans in the DGC and the integrins of the integrin-vinculin-talin complex.

The DGC consists of peripheral and integral proteins that physically traverse the sarcolemma and connect the ECM to the F-actin based cytoskeleton. The core proteins of DGC are dystrophin, the sarcoglycans (including alpha, beta, gamma, and lambda sarcoglycan), sarcospan, dystroglycan (alpha and beta), and syntrophin. These proteins are thought to play an important role in maintaining the structural integrity of sarcolemma during contraction and stretching, and loss of these core proteins results in progressive contraction induced damage.

The vinculin and talin components of the integrin-vinculin-talin complex are cytoskeletal proteins physically anchored to the costamere as a whole via the integrin components, which are transmembrane proteins that interact directly with filamin C of the Z disk.

== Function ==
Costameres have several primary functions. First, they keep the sarcolemma in line with the sarcomere during contraction and subsequent relaxation. They are also responsible for the lateral transmission of the sarcomere-generated contractile force to the sarcolemma and the extracellular matrix. Only 20-30% of the total force generated by sarcomere contraction is transmitted longitudinally, suggesting that the majority of the force generated by sarcomeres is transduced in the lateral direction, perpendicular to the contracting myofibril fibers. Most of the force generated by the sarcomeres deep inside the muscle fiber is transmitted perpendicularly to adjacent myofibrils until it reaches the peripheral myofibrils. At that point, the costameric complex channels the force through the sarcolemma to the extracellular matrix. The lateral transmission of force by costameres helps maintain uniform sarcomere lengths in adjacent muscle cells that are under the control of different motor units and are therefore not synchronized in their active contractions; restated, if one muscle fiber is actively contracting and an adjacent one is not, the lateral force transmission helps this second fiber to shorten as well. Costameres also transmit forces in the opposite direction, transmitting the forces of external mechanical stress from the sarcolemma to the Z-disk. Costameres are also involved in protecting the relatively weak and labile sarcolemma from the mechanical stresses of contraction and stretching. The proteins mechanically support the lipid bilayer, and also may facilitate an organized folding of the plasma membrane ("festooning") that minimizes stress on the bilayer during contraction and stretching. Finally, costameres are also involved in the orchestration of mechanically related signaling.

== Pathology ==
The dysfunction of the proteins involved in costameres contributes to some muscular diseases, including muscular dystrophies and cardiomyopathies.

== Dynamics ==
Costameres are dynamic structures. Several studies have suggested that costameres are responsive to mechanical, electrical, and chemical stimuli. For instance, mechanical tension is critical in regulating costameric protein expression, stability, and organization, and dystrophin deficient costameres may sense increased mechanical stress and attempt to compensate with filament recruitment.
