= Focal adhesion =

Structures which transmit force and signals between a cell and the extracellular matrix

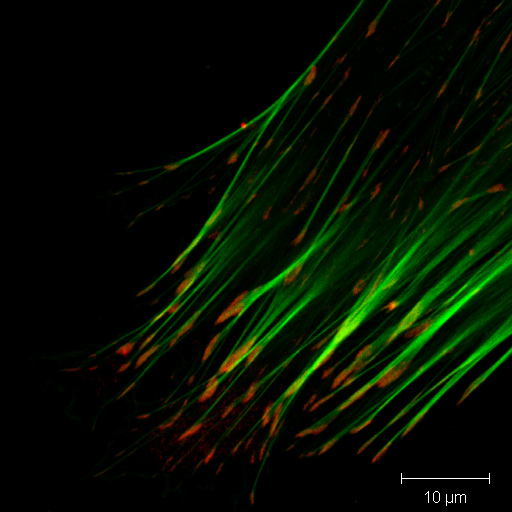
Immunofluorescence coloration of actin (green) and the focal adhesion protein vinculin (red) in a fibroblast. Focal adhesions are visible as red dots at the end of the green bundles.

Focal adhesions (FAs) also cell–matrix adhesions are large multiprotein complexes through which mechanical force and regulatory signals are transmitted between the extracellular matrix (ECM) and an interacting cell. Focal adhesions are associated with the outer cell membrane, located at the ends of actin fibres of the cytoskeleton. They mediate the regulatory signaling events of a cell's response to ECM adhesion.

Focal adhesions serve as the mechanical linkages to the ECM, and as a biochemical signaling hub to concentrate and direct numerous signaling proteins at sites of integrin binding and clustering.

== Structure and function ==
Focal adhesions are integrin-containing, multi-protein structures that form mechanical links between intracellular actin bundles and the extracellular substrate in many cell types. Focal adhesions are large, dynamic protein complexes through which the cytoskeleton of a cell connects to the ECM. They are limited to clearly defined ranges of the cell, at which the plasma membrane closes to within 15 nm of the ECM substrate. Focal adhesions are in a state of constant flux: proteins associate and disassociate with it continually as signals are transmitted to other parts of the cell, relating to anything from cell motility to cell cycle. Focal adhesions can contain over 100 different proteins, which suggests a considerable functional diversity. More than anchoring the cell, they function as signal carriers (sensors), which inform the cell about the condition of the ECM and thus affect their behavior. In sessile cells, focal adhesions are quite stable under normal conditions, while in moving cells their stability is diminished: this is because in motile cells, focal adhesions are being constantly assembled and disassembled as the cell establishes new contacts at the leading edge, and breaks old contacts at the trailing edge of the cell. One example of their important role is in the immune system, in which white blood cells migrate along the connective endothelium following cellular signals to damaged biological tissue.

== Morphology ==
Connection between focal adhesions and proteins of the extracellular matrix generally involves integrins. Integrins bind to extra-cellular proteins via short amino acid sequences, such as the RGD motif (found in proteins such as fibronectin, laminin, or vitronectin), or the DGEA and GFOGER motifs found in collagen. Integrins are heterodimers which are formed from one beta and one alpha subunit. These subunits are present in different forms, their corresponding ligands classify these receptors into four groups: RGD receptors, laminin receptors, leukocyte-specific receptors and collagen receptors. Within the cell, the intracellular domain of integrin binds to the cytoskeleton via adapter proteins such as talin, α-actinin, filamin, vinculin and tensin. Many other intracellular signalling proteins, such as focal adhesion kinase, bind to and associate with this integrin-adapter protein–cytoskeleton complex, and this forms the basis of a focal adhesion.

== Adhesion dynamics with migrating cells ==
The dynamic assembly and disassembly of focal adhesions plays a central role in cell migration. During cell migration, both the composition and the morphology of the focal adhesion change. Initially, small (0.25μm^{2}) focal adhesions called focal complexes (FXs) are formed at the leading edge of the cell in lamellipodia: they consist of integrin, and some of the adapter proteins, such as talin, paxillin and tensin. Many of these focal complexes fail to mature and are disassembled as the lamellipodia withdraw. However, some focal complexes mature into larger and stable focal adhesions, and recruit many more proteins such as zyxin. Recruitment of components to the focal adhesion occurs in an ordered, sequential manner. Once in place, a focal adhesion remains stationary with respect to the extracellular matrix, and the cell uses this as an anchor on which it can push or pull itself over the ECM. As the cell progresses along its chosen path, a given focal adhesion moves closer and closer to the trailing edge of the cell. At the trailing edge of the cell the focal adhesion must be dissolved. The mechanism of this is poorly understood and is probably instigated by a variety of different methods depending on the circumstances of the cell. One possibility is that the calcium-dependent protease calpain is involved: it has been shown that the inhibition of calpain leads to the inhibition of focal adhesion-ECM separation. Focal adhesion components are amongst the known calpain substrates, and it is possible that calpain degrades these components to aid in focal adhesion disassembly

=== Actin retrograde flow ===
The assembly of nascent focal adhesions is highly dependent on the process of retrograde actin flow. This is the phenomenon in a migrating cell where actin filaments polymerize at the leading edge and flow back towards the cell body. This is the source of traction required for migration; the focal adhesion acts as a molecular clutch when it tethers to the ECM and impedes the retrograde movement of actin, thus generating the pulling (traction) force at the site of the adhesion that is necessary for the cell to move forward. This traction can be visualized with traction force microscopy. A common metaphor to explain actin retrograde flow is a large number of people being washed downriver, and as they do so, some of them hang on to rocks and branches along the bank to stop their downriver motion. Thus, a pulling force is generated onto the rock or branch that they are hanging on to. These forces are necessary for the successful assembly, growth, and maturation of focal adhesions.

=== Natural biomechanical sensor ===
Extracellular mechanical forces, which are exerted through focal adhesions, can activate Src kinase and stimulate the growth of the adhesions. This indicates that focal adhesions may function as mechanical sensors, and suggests that force generated from myosin fibers could contribute to maturing the focal complexes. This gains further support from the fact that inhibition of myosin-generated forces leads to slow disassembly of focal adhesions, by changing the turnover kinetics of the focal adhesion proteins.

The relationship between forces on focal adhesions and their compositional maturation, however, remains unclear. For instance, preventing focal adhesion maturation by inhibiting myosin activity or stress fiber assembly does not prevent forces sustained by focal adhesions, nor does it prevent cells from migrating. Thus force propagation through focal adhesions may not be sensed directly by cells at all time and force scales.

Their role in mechanosensing is important for durotaxis.

== See also ==
- Actin
- TES (protein)
- Paxillin
