= Filamin-A =

Protein-coding gene in humans

FLNA
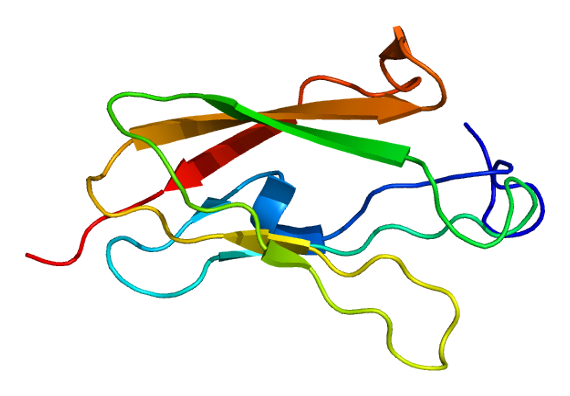

Identifiers
- Aliases: FLNA, ABP-280, ABPX, CSBS, CVD1, FLN, FLN-A, FLN1, FMD, MNS, NHBP, OPD, OPD1, OPD2, XLVD, XMVD, filamin A, FGS2
- External IDs: OMIM: 300017; MGI: 95556; GeneCards: FLNA
Available structures
PDB	Ortholog search: PDBe RCSB
PDB	List of PDB id codes 2AAV, 2BP3, 2BRQ, 2J3S, 2JF1, 2K3T, 2K7P, 2MTP, 2W0P, 2WFN, 3CNK, 3HOC, 3HOP, 3HOR, 3ISW, 3RGH, 4M9P, 4P3W

Gene location (Human)
Chr.	X chromosome (human)
Band	Xq28	Start	154,348,524 bp
Band	Xq28	End	154,374,634 bp

Gene location (Mouse)
Chr.	X chromosome (mouse)
Band	X A7.3|X 37.89 cM	Start	73,267,067 bp
Band	X A7.3|X 37.89 cM	End	73,293,426 bp
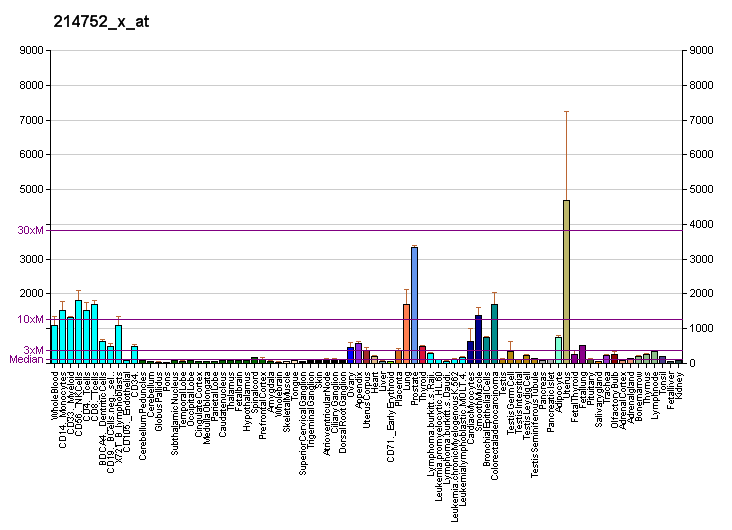

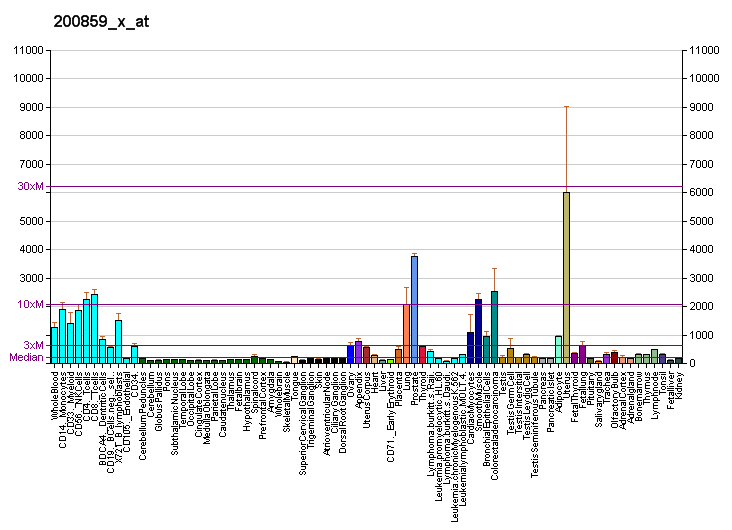

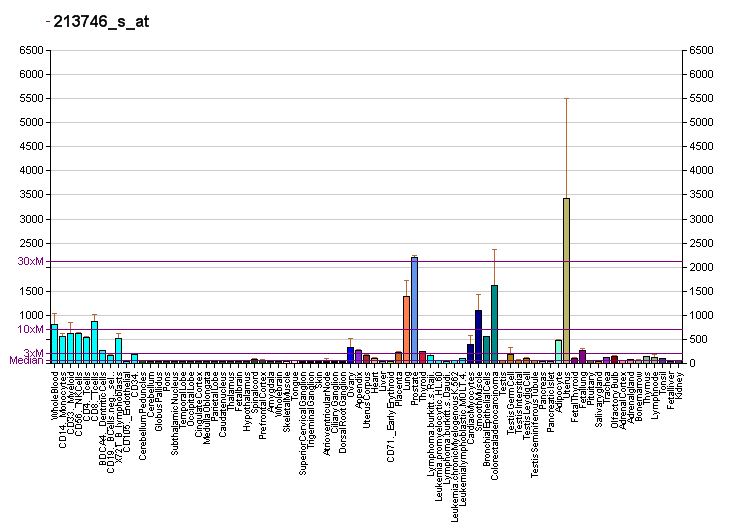
RNA expression pattern
Bgee	Human / Mouse (ortholog); Top expressed in: right coronary artery; popliteal artery; tibial arteries; ascending aorta; Descending thoracic aorta; body of uterus; saphenous vein; gastric mucosa; left coronary artery; muscle layer of sigmoid colon / Top expressed in: tunica media of zone of aorta; granulocyte; ascending aorta; uterus; cervix; umbilical cord; external carotid artery; aortic valve; internal carotid artery; tail of embryo; More reference expression data
BioGPS	More reference expression data
Gene ontology
Molecular function	protein homodimerization activity; protein-containing complex binding; transcription factor binding; mu-type opioid receptor binding; signal transducer activity; actin filament binding; small GTPase binding; kinase binding; actin binding; SMAD binding; Fc-gamma receptor I complex binding; G protein-coupled receptor binding; GTPase binding; RNA binding; potassium channel regulator activity; transmembrane transporter binding; cadherin binding; protein binding
Cellular component	cytoplasm; membrane; focal adhesion; cortical cytoskeleton; plasma membrane; Myb complex; dendritic shaft; extracellular region; soma; cell cortex; nucleolus; actin filament; actin cytoskeleton; perinuclear region of cytoplasm; extracellular exosome; cytoskeleton; nucleus; apical dendrite; filamentous actin; extracellular matrix; cell-cell junction; cytosol; Z discdkac
Biological process	actin cytoskeleton reorganization; negative regulation of transcription by RNA polymerase I; negative regulation of protein catabolic process; establishment of protein localization; protein stabilization; platelet degranulation; mRNA transcription by RNA polymerase II; negative regulation of apoptotic process; receptor clustering; negative regulation of DNA-binding transcription factor activity; cytoplasmic sequestering of protein; platelet activation; mitotic spindle assembly; positive regulation of substrate adhesion-dependent cell spreading; protein localization to cell surface; cell projection organization; adenylate cyclase-inhibiting dopamine receptor signaling pathway; actin crosslink formation; positive regulation of I-kappaB kinase/NF-kappaB signaling; positive regulation of integrin-mediated signaling pathway; platelet aggregation; cell junction assembly; regulation of cell migration; wound healing, spreading of cells; semaphorin-plexin signaling pathway; formation of radial glial scaffolds; cerebral cortex development; cilium assembly; protein localization to plasma membrane; positive regulation of potassium ion transmembrane transport; regulation of membrane repolarization during atrial cardiac muscle cell action potential; regulation of membrane repolarization during cardiac muscle cell action potential; positive regulation of neural precursor cell proliferation; positive regulation of neuron migration
Sources:Amigo / QuickGO
Orthologs
Databases	NCBI: entry; OMA: entry
Species	Human	Mouse
Entrez	2316	192176
Ensembl	ENSG00000196924	ENSMUSG00000031328
UniProt	P21333	Q8BTM8
RefSeq (mRNA)	NM_001110556; NM_001456	NM_001290421; NM_010227
RefSeq (protein)	NP_001104026; NP_001447	NP_001277350; NP_034357; NP_001390993
Location (UCSC)	Chr X: 154.35 – 154.37 Mb	Chr X: 73.27 – 73.29 Mb
PubMed search
- Wikidata
View/Edit Human	View/Edit Mouse

Filamin A, alpha (FLNA) is a protein that in humans is encoded by the FLNA gene.

== Structure ==
The structure of filamin A, alpha includes an actin binding N terminal domain, 24 internal repeats and 2 hinge regions.

== Function ==
Actin-binding protein, or filamin, is a 280-kD protein that crosslinks actin filaments into orthogonal networks in cortical cytoplasm and participates in the anchoring of membrane proteins for the actin cytoskeleton. Remodeling of the cytoskeleton is central to the modulation of cell shape and migration. Filamin A, encoded by the FLNA gene, is a widely expressed filamin that regulates the reorganization of the actin cytoskeleton by interacting with integrins, transmembrane receptor complexes, and secondary messengers. At least 31 disease-causing mutations in this gene have been discovered.

=== DNA repair ===
Interaction of FLNA with the BRCA1 protein is required for efficient regulation of early stages of DNA repair processes. FLNA is implicated in the control of the DNA repair process of homologous recombination and non-homologous end joining.

== Interactions ==
Filamin has been shown to interact with:

- BRCA2,
- CD29
- CASR,
- FBLIM1,
- FILIP1,
- FLNB,
- NPHP1,
- RALA,
- SH2B3,
- TRIO, and
- VHL.
