= Cecil Hackett =

Australian doctor, anthropologist and medical researcher

Cecil John Hackett FRCP (25 April 1905 in Norwood, South Australia – 8 April 1995 in England) was an Australian medical doctor, anthropologist and medical researcher. His research covered Indigenous communities in Central Australia in the 1920s and 1930s. From 1954 to 1965 he worked at the World Health Organization (WHO), leading the organisation's efforts at the largely successful eradication of yaws and becoming a world expert of the disease.

== Biography ==
Hackett was educated at Queen's School, North Adelaide and St Peter's College. He studied medicine at the University of Adelaide between 1922 and 1927. At the end of his first year he went on a university expedition to Central Australia. Hackett there met an Aboriginal woman with boomerang leg. After graduating he worked a year in a hospital in Adelaide. Between 1929 and 1930 Hackett studied at the London School of Hygiene and Tropical Medicine. He became lifelong friends with another South Australian working there, Neil Hamilton-Fairley. Hackett then worked for the Colonial Service in Shanghai in 1932 but had to return to Adelaide because of his bad health.

In 1933, Hackett joined Norman Tindale on an expedition to the Mann and Musgrave ranges to study the Pitjantjatjara people. This involved spending two months on camels following tribal groups. Hackett later wrote "The experience of living among the hunter-gatherer Pitjantjatjara in conditions where they were the majority and privileged and we were the minority and under privileged, made a lasting impression on me. We were attracted to these cheerful good-natured folk who were so well adapted to their tough environment…..Their detailed knowledge of their country, their skills and intelligence soon gained our respect." His journals of this and other expeditions are now in the South Australian Museum. After encountering another person suffering from boomerang leg, Hackett was determined to find out the cause of the deformation. He received a grant from Adelaide University and managed to determine that the condition was not caused by yaws, as had been suspected, rather it was a non-venereal treponemal infection. For his discovery he was awarded a Doctor of Medicine.

In 1937, Hackett once more went to England, where he worked in the Anatomy department of Cambridge University. He then received a Senior Research Fellowship from the British Medical Research Council. This enabled Hackett to go to Uganda, where he researched the occurrence of yaws and syphilis. On his return he married Bessie Beattie Shaw (born South Africa 10 November 1912). Hamilton-Fairley and his wife Mary were their witnesses. Cecil and Beattie went on to have two sons and remained married until his death. In 1940 his research was finished and Hackett received a doctorate from Cambridge, however his paper Bone lesions of yaws in Uganda would not be published until much later, in 1951. With the start of World War II Hackett joined the RAF, serving in Sierra Leone, Egypt, India and Burma, mainly being concerned with the prevention of malaria.

After the war ended, Hackett returned to England, where he became director of the Wellcome Museum of Anatomy and Pathology in London. In 1951 he was made a Fellow in the Royal College of Physicians. In 1954 he joined the World Health Organization in Geneva, to become Medical Officer in the Venereal Diseases and Treponematoses Section. During the following ten years he helped organise yaws eradication programs in many countries in Africa, Asia and South America. The success of these campaigns in reducing the global prevalence of yaws and other endemic treponematoses by 95% was credited as one of the greatest public health achievements in the history of the organization. He retired in 1965 and returned to London, where he continued his research on diverse topics. One of these was to determine whether the historical spread of disease could be charted by examining the bone lesions of dated human remains. This work, published in 1976, has been used frequently to suggest that syphilis entered Europe long before Columbus. Another later publication focuses on the visible changes that bones undergo after deposition and burial, important in the field of archaeology. Hackett died of Alzheimer's disease in London in April 1995.
