= Ainslie Caterer =

Australian cricketer, cricket administrator and educator

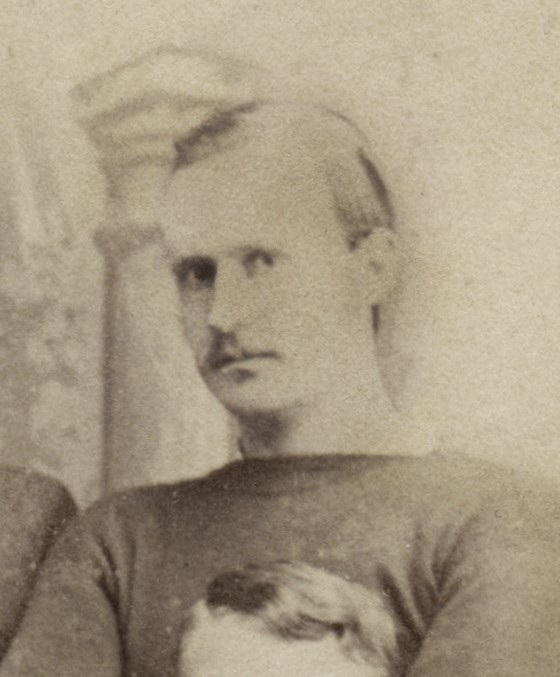

Personal information
- Full name: Thomas Ainslie Caterer
- Born: 16 May 1858; Woodville, South Australia
- Died: 25 August 1924 (aged 66); Walkerville, South Australia
- Batting: Left-handed
- Bowling: Left-arm fast-medium
- Role: Bowler

Domestic team information
- Years: Team
- 1884/85: South Australia

Career statistics
Competition	First-class
Matches	1
Runs scored	0
Batting average	–
100s/50s	0/0
Top score	0*
Balls bowled	124
Wickets	1
Bowling average	42.00
5 wickets in innings	0
10 wickets in match	0
Best bowling	1/42
Catches/stumpings	0/–
- Source: CricketArchive, 18 August 2015

Thomas Ainslie Caterer (16 May 1858 – 25 August 1924) was a leading South Australian cricketer, Australian rules footballer, cricket administrator and educator of the late nineteenth and early twentieth centuries.

Born in Woodville, South Australia to Thomas Caterer, a pioneer Adelaide teacher, mayor of Kensington and Norwood and President of Norwood Football Club, and Marina (née Mudie), Caterer attended Norwood Grammar, the school founded by his father, and the then newly opened University of Adelaide. In 1879, Caterer became the first graduate of the university, with a Bachelor of Arts. Friends and well-wishers attempted to attend the graduation ceremony but were banned from doing so.

== Sporting career ==
Caterer made his senior footballing debut in 1870 with South Australian Football Association (SAFA) club Kensington, where he also served as honorary secretary in 1870. He served as SAFA chairman for two years from 1880 and then as a committeeman and was awarded life membership in 1886. Late in his footballing career Caterer debuted for Norwood Football Club, playing two games for them in 1884.

A left arm fast-medium bowler, Caterer began playing for Kensington Cricket Club and later for Adelaide Cricket Club, and played his first important, non-first-class cricket match for South Australia against a combined "Australians" side at the Adelaide Oval from 6 November 1880, scoring ten and seven and taking 1/8 (one wicket for eight runs) and 1/15. He was not picked for the inaugural inter-colonial match between South Australia and Victoria played a week later, instead playing for a South Australian second eleven against a Suburban Association XI.

Caterer continued to bowl well in Adelaide district cricket over the following seasons and was chosen in the South Australian side to play the Australians in Adelaide starting 14 March 1884, taking 4/60, including bowling Australian captain Billy Murdoch first ball.

In the 1884/85 season, Caterer was chosen in a South Australian side to play the touring English team led by Alfred Shaw, taking match figures of 7/109 and impressing the South Australian selectors enough to name him in the South Australian team to play against Victoria at the Melbourne Cricket Ground (MCG).

The match, which proved to be Caterer's only first-class match, started on 23 January 1885. He took 1/42 and failed to score a run as South Australia won by 53 runs.

== Sports administration ==
Caterer had been involved in sports administration since 1880 when serving as Kensington Football Club's delegate to the South Australian Football Association and chairing its general meetings. He unsuccessfully stood for a position on the South Australian Cricket Association's (SACA) Ground and Finance Committee in 1901 before his election to the Committee in 1904, serving on the committee until 1913 and 1915 to 1922. In addition to his membership of the Ground and Finance Committee, Caterer also served as Chairman of the SACA Cricket Committee from 1918 to 1921 and served as a proxy delegate on the Board of Control for International Cricket. For his service to SACA, Caterer was elected as a Life Member in 1923.

In 1909, Caterer organised for St Peter's College to employ English player Jack Crawford at £160 per year in order for Crawford to play for South Australia.

Additionally, Caterer served as the chairman of the South Australian Poultry and Dog Society and was appointed an honorary life member.

== Teaching career ==
Caterer began teaching, first at Norwood Grammar before moving to St Peter's College in 1886. He rose to the position of Senior Resident Master, edited the school's magazine, organised St Peter's WWI memorial and was acting headmaster from 1916 to 1919 following the resignation of Henry Girdlestone. Additionally, Caterer was elected Clerk of the Senate of the University of Adelaide in 1888, a position he held until July 1922, and he was a member of the University Council from 1917 to 1921.

Caterer suffered a stroke in April 1921 and was invalided. He retired from his position at St Peter's College and did not seek re-election to the University Council. He retired from his role at the University Senate in July 1922 but although he was unable to attend meetings, he did not resign from his SACA committee positions. In response, Caterer was asked to resign but refused to do so, leading SACA to evoke, for the first time, the rule that allowed them to declare a position on the Ground and Finance Committee open. Three weeks later Caterer was declared an honorary life member.

Caterer died at his Walkerville home in Adelaide, predeceased by his wife Amy (née Edmunds) and survived by two daughters; Colleen Ringwood, who was living in the Northern Territory with her husband, and Miss Brenda Caterer of Adelaide. St Peter's College created the Caterer Memorial Scholarship in his honour.

== Sources ==
- Harte, C. (1990) The History of the South Australian Cricket Association, Sports Marketing: Adelaide. ISBN 0 958 7980 3 6.
- Page, R. (1984) South Australian cricketers 1877-1984, Association of Cricket Statisticians: Houghton Mill, Nottinghamshire.
- Thornton, K. (2010) The Messages of Its Walls and Fields: A History of St Peter's College, 1847 to 2009, Wakefield Press: Adelaide. ISBN 9 781 862 5492 2 7.
