= William Ray (pathologist) =

English-born academic

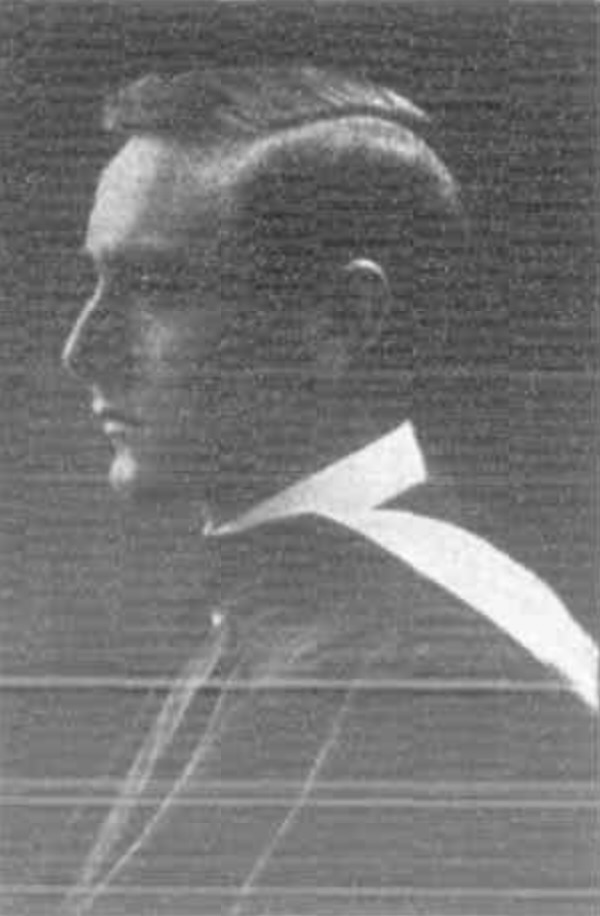
William Ray in 1907

William Ray (c. 1884 – 6 or 7 June 1953) was an English-born academic in Adelaide, South Australia.

== History ==
Ray was born in Manchester, England, the youngest son of William Ray (c. 1844 – 10 June 1932), and emigrated with his parents to South Australia, settling in North Adelaide. Young William was educated at Queen's School, North Adelaide and St Peter's College, then studied medicine at the University of Adelaide, where he had a brilliant career, culminating in a Rhodes Scholarship, which took him in 1907 to Magdalen College, Oxford, followed by pathology work at the Lister laboratory, for which research work ("concerning passive immunity in relation to infectious diseases") he was awarded the Philip Walker Studentship in pathology of £200 per year for three years.

He returned to Adelaide in 1913, and was appointed to the Adelaide Hospital staff as an in-patient physician, which he filled for 20 years.

He also served as lecturer in the University of Adelaide Faculty of Medicine and acting Dean in 1926 during Prof. Frederic Wood-Jones' absences, and when Wood-Jones resigned to take a position at the University of Hawaii, was appointed to the post for the remainder of 1926–27.

In January 1938 he was appointed Director-General of Medical Studies at the university.

Ray was for many years a member of the University Council and the Council of St. Mark's College.

He served as Police Surgeon from 1927 (or earlier) to 1936, and was recognised as one of Australia's pre-eminent authorities on medico-legal affairs. His successor was Dr. Arthur Walter Sydney James Welch.

== Family ==
Ray married Mona Carleton Parker (1882 – 4 April 1953) in Whittlesford, Cambridgeshire on 18 June 1910. They had a son and daughter:

- John Ray, cricketer for Adelaide district, later a practising medical doctor in South Yarra, Melbourne
- Jocelyn Ray also lived in Melbourne.

Walter Vernon Ray S.M. (1880 – 7 March 1952) was a brother. He married Clarice Lilian Parker (born 1884) in 1910. Clarice and Mona were not sisters.
