= Queen's College, North Adelaide =

Australian school (operated 1891–1949)

Queen's College was a privately owned and run school for boys on Barton Terrace, North Adelaide. It ran continuously from 1891 to 1949, an Australian record for a proprietary (Note: The qualification "proprietary" excludes church-run schools, of which there is a great number.) boys' school.

== History ==
In 1885 Rev. Thomas Field (later Canon Field) and Frank Dobbs opened the Adelaide School Collegiate' for the Anglican Church in the Christ Church schoolrooms at c. 79–85 Jeffcott Street, North Adelaide. In 1889 Dobbs retired and was succeeded by the Rev. H. A. Brookshank, M.A.

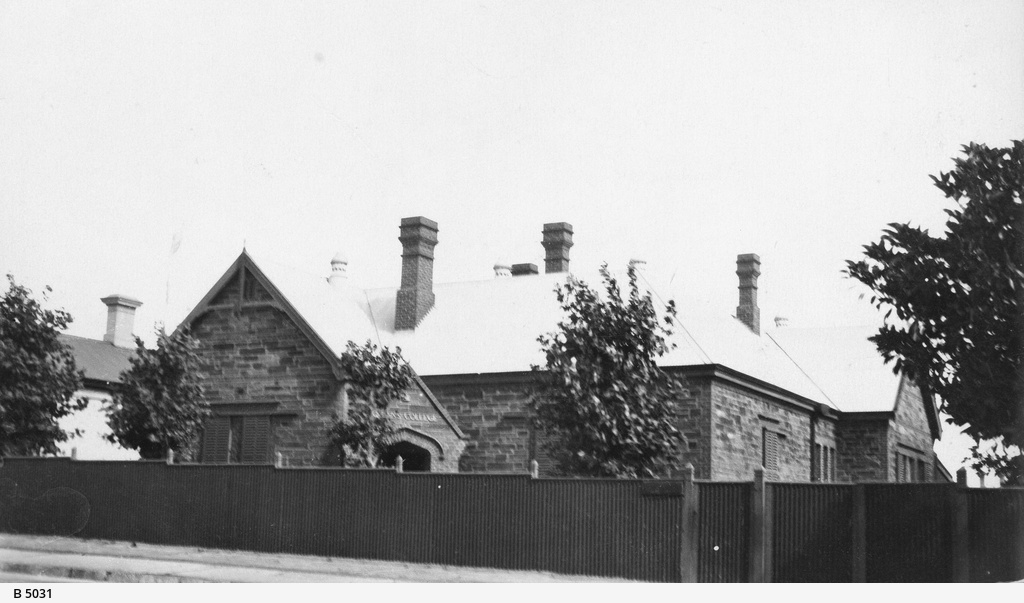
Queen's School, North Adelaide c 1928

Queen's College, North Adelaide
1 Schoolhouse
2 Christ Church
3 Christ Church schoolroom

In 1891 the school was taken over as a private venture by J. H. Lindon and G. L. Heinemann, and renamed "The Queen's School" in honour of Queen Victoria.

James Henry Lindon, MA (8 June 1856 – 6 June 1897) was born on Jersey and educated at Rossall School and Trinity College, Cambridge, where he took his M.A.
He had some health problems and, looking for a healthier climate, emigrated to Queensland. While there he accepted a teaching position with Sydney Grammar School. In 1883 he was appointed classical tutor at Trinity College, Melbourne and the following year he took the position of second master at St Peter's College, Adelaide. He was there during the typhoid scare of 1886, at the end of which year the headmaster, Rev. Williams, took a year's leave for a trip to England, and Lindon acted in his place.

The new school was a success from the start. The first school year opened with 34 students and ended with 72, and managed to provide quality education despite the cramped conditions. Teachers in that first year include: L. B. Cross, Bronard, Greenwood, Wallace Packer, Hugo Leschen, Norman MacGeorge and Sgt. Egan, who drilled the boys twice a week. At the end-of-year prizegiving, the visiting examiner B. T. Williams pronounced the school highly successful in producing boys with high average standard of education rather than a few brilliant examples from talented boys. In 1892 a new building was constructed on Barton Terrace, four doors east of the boarding-house, to a design by architect Frank J. Naish (c. 1843–1904), which included four classrooms 26 by 20 feet (7.9 m × 6.1 m), an assembly room "Big School Room" 40 by 20 feet (12.2 m × 6.1 m) and a chemistry laboratory. Ceilings were 16 feet (4.9 m) high. The grounds included tennis courts and a parade area. The school was close to the Park Lands and an oval, where the first of many cricket matches was held between Queen's School and Hahndorf Academy.

Heinemann, a member of the famous publishing family, left at the end of 1895 to return to Britain, and Lindon, who by this time was bed-ridden, took on as partner R. G. Jacomb-Hood. Lindon died in 1897, and his remains were buried at the North Road Cemetery alongside those of J. A. Hartley and J. T. Sunter of Prince Alfred College.

Robert Gordon Jacomb-Hood MA (3 June 1865 – 22 July 1897) was born in Chudleigh, Devonshire, a son of civil engineer John Hood, and has been cited as a descendant of Samuel Hood. He was educated at Rugby, and Clare College, Cambridge, where he obtained his M.A. He was for five years house master at Wadham School then, Like Lindon, emigrated to Australia for the healthier climate. In 1891 he was appointed assistant master at Cumloden School on Alma Road, St Kilda, Victoria. In 1895 he moved to Adelaide, and Queen's College, whose proprietor, Lindon, was ill, and took over management of the school. Hood was a noted Classical scholar and a keen golfer. He never married, but had a brother, Dr. Charles Jacomb-Hood, and three sisters in England. He too was buried at the North Road cemetery. No definite link has yet been found to the English artist George Percy Jacomb-Hood.

Hood purchased the business from Lindon's widow and ran the school successfully for 30 years. On 27 August 1926 Edward Stokes, M.A. took over the school, which continued to prosper and, "on the advice of a number of old boys and certain educationists", it was in 1928 renamed Queen's College.

Edward Stokes (c. 1880 – 6 April 1934) was born in Melrose, South Australia a son of Rev. Frank H. Stokes and grandson of General John Stokes. He was educated at St Peter's College and Adelaide University, then went to Magdalen College, Oxford, where be gained his M.A. and an exhibition in chemistry. In 1908 he was appointed to the Imperial Indian Education Service as a headmaster at Bareilly, Oudh Province. On November 19 November 1909, after a brief return to Adelaide, he married in Bombay May, youngest daughter of Willett Ram of Halesworth, Suffolk; they had one son and five daughters. He returned to Adelaide in 1923 to take up an appointment as master in charge of the Preparatory School at St Peters College, then in 1926 purchased Queen's College. He died in 1934 and was buried at the North Road Cemetery.

The curriculum in the 1930s included history (ancient, English, Australian, and economic), geography, classics, modern languages, mathematics, science, book-keeping, and shorthand. The boys were organised into two Houses, "Lindon" and "Jacomb-Hood" (later simply "Hood"), named for the first two headmasters. They competed for the Bonython Cup, presented by Sir Langdon. The school colours were chocolate and gold. The school library, which contained over 800 books, memorialised Sir Ross Smith, who with his brother Keith was educated at the school. Stokes died on 7 April 1934 and D. O. Haslam, who had been with the school since 1931, leased the college and boarding house from Stokes' trustees.

Dudley Osborne Haslam (1909–2004) was a son of William Osborne Haslam (1882–1959) and Gertrude Amy Haslam, née Button (1884– ). He was educated at Scotch and Prince Alfred colleges, and studied engineering at Adelaide University. He joined the school in 1931 as assistant master, then in 1933 succeeded T. A. Le Messurier as Science and Mathematics master. He married Ivy Clarice Morriss of Mannum, South Australia on 26 January 1935. He

The school roll dropped in the mid-1930s, then returned to 100 in 1938 and continued to grow, reaching 133 in 1941 and 160 in 1943, and there were now three Houses: Hood, Lindon and Field. Additional property was purchased in 1942 to cope with the increase then in July 1949 Haslam announced that the school was no longer viable and would close at the end of the year. Haslam immediately accepted the offer of a teaching appointment with his old school Scotch College. Many of the school's pupils transferred to Pulteney Grammar School.

== Notable students ==
Arguably the best-known names among past students were Sir Ross and Keith Smith, but the school had seven or eight Rhodes Scholars including Reginald J. Rudall and Dr. W. Ray, and a surprising number of prominent medical men including Dr Thorold Grant, whose dermatitis case made headline news in 1933, and the leading London ENT specialist F. F. Muecke who married Ada Crossley.

Other notable students included Lawrence Bragg, (Note: Like many students listed here including Muecke, Bragg attended Queen's School for a year or two before enrolling with St Peter's College. Bragg was at Queen's in 1900; SPC 1901–1905.) Cecil Hackett, Elton Mayo and his brother Herbert Mayo, Victor Marra Newland, Grenfell Price, Walter Parsons, Reginald Rudall and Arthur Rymill

In the Great War of 1914–1918, around 200 "old boys" enlisted, 34 losing their lives.
