= Francis Williams (headmaster) =

Headmaster of St Peter's college

Rev. Francis Williams (1830 – 21 July 1895) was headmaster of St Peter's College, Adelaide, South Australia.

== History ==
Williams was born in Oxford, England and educated at Hurstpierpoint College and Lincoln College, Oxford, where he graduated BA in 1854, and MA in 1860. He was ordained deacon in 1852 and priest in 1853 in the Diocese of Rochester.

He came to South Australia in 1861 without fanfare to take a position with St Peter's College as third master; in 1873 he was appointed second master, and subsequently bursar.

At the end of 1881, after allegations of Ritualism and subsequent divisions in the College Council, W. Bedell Stanford, who had been appointed Head Master by Bishop Short in 1879, resigned. Williams was persuaded to postpone his planned holiday to England, and was made acting Head, and in 1882 was formally appointed to the position. In April 1886 Williams and a College man-servant suffered from a severe attack of typhoid fever, but no student or other staff member was affected. In December that year he took twelve months' holiday to England, James Henry Lindon (8 June 1856 – 6 June 1897), later founder of Queen's College, North Adelaide, acting in his place.

In 1889 he resigned as Head Master, and was succeeded (briefly) by the Rev. Philip Edwin Raynor, M.A. ( – October 1930), who was in turn replaced by the Rev. Henry Girdlestone, M.A. (c. 1863 – 29 June 1926), perhaps the college's most successful headmaster.

In 1892 Williams was appointed Bishop's Chaplain to Dr. Kennion, then Dr. Harmer's Chaplain.

Williams was appointed to St. Peter's College' Board of Governors, a position he actively maintained until his death.

He collapsed and died aboard a tramcar while returning to his home "Woodspring" in Unley Park from St Peter's Cathedral, where he had been acting as chaplain at the morning church service. His remains were interred at the North Road Cemetery.

== Family ==
Williams married Celia Roubel Laurie (1 May 1852 – 16 March 1922) on 29 June 1871, Celia was a daughter of B. F. Laurie, SM., of "Southcott", Port Elliot.

- Eva Roubel Williams (24 August 1872 – 9 December 1932) married Frederick Augustus d'Arenberg, both eldest daughters alumnae of Advanced School for Girls.
- Dora Frances Williams (21 October 1874 – 10? 13? November 1950) married Thomas Slaney Poole in 1903
- Mary Violet Williams (29 March 1876 – 31 May 1949) married William Gosse Hay on 26 October 1901. William was a son of Alexander Hay
- Grace Laurie Williams (1880– ) married Rev. E. Iliff Robson on 20 May 1903 in London.
- (Florence) Irene Williams (1 December 1882 – 1945) married Percival Robinson on 7 December 1907, lived in New South Wales
- F(rank) Laurie Williams (9 May 1885 – 6 January 1945)
- Christabel Hope Williams (3 December 1886 – 28 May 1943) married Norton Hervey Case on 20 June 1908, lived in New South Wales
- Arthur Denzil Williams (12 July 1891 – 26 October 1941)
- Claud Roubel Williams (3 July 1894 – c. 1946)
