= Larsen syndrome =

Congenital disorder

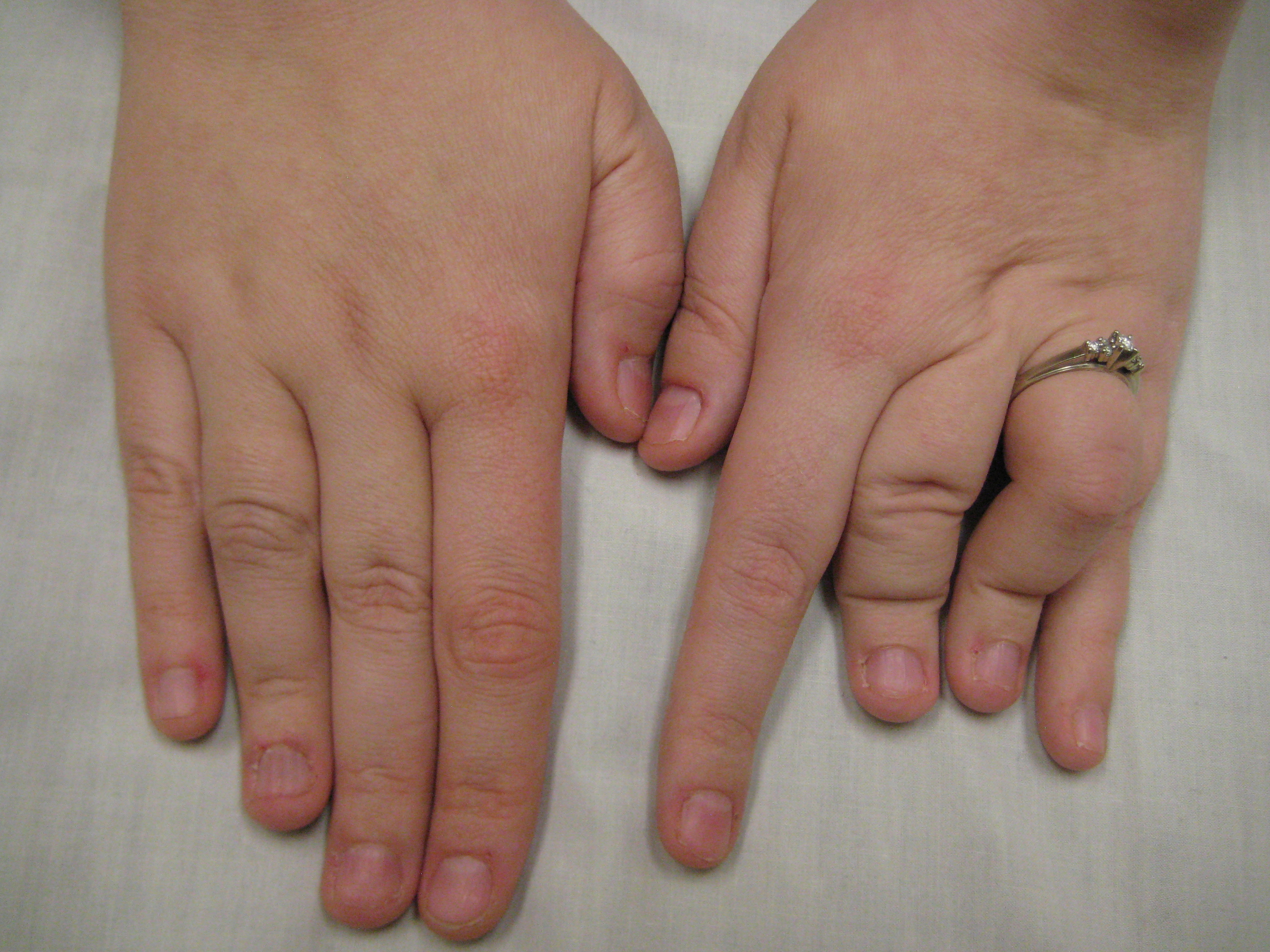
- Hands of a person with Larsen syndrome: Note the joint abnormalities of the left hand.

Larsen syndrome (LS) is a congenital disorder discovered in 1950 by Larsen and associates when they observed dislocation of the large joints and face anomalies in six of their patients. Patients with Larsen syndrome normally present with a variety of symptoms, including congenital anterior dislocation of the knees, dislocation of the hips and elbows, flattened facial appearance, prominent foreheads, and depressed nasal bridges. Larsen syndrome can also cause a variety of cardiovascular and orthopedic abnormalities. This rare disorder is caused by a genetic defect in the gene encoding filamin B, a cytoplasmic protein that is important in regulating the structure and activity of the cytoskeleton. The gene that influences the emergence of Larsen syndrome is found in chromosome region, 3p21.1-14.1, a region containing human type VII collagen gene. Larsen syndrome has recently been described as a mesenchyme disorder that affects the connective tissue of an individual. Autosomal dominant and recessive forms of the disorder have been reported, although most cases are autosomal dominant. Reports have found that in Western societies, Larsen syndrome can be found in one in every 100,000 births, but this is most likely an underestimate because the disorder is frequently unrecognized or misdiagnosed.

== Signs and symptoms ==
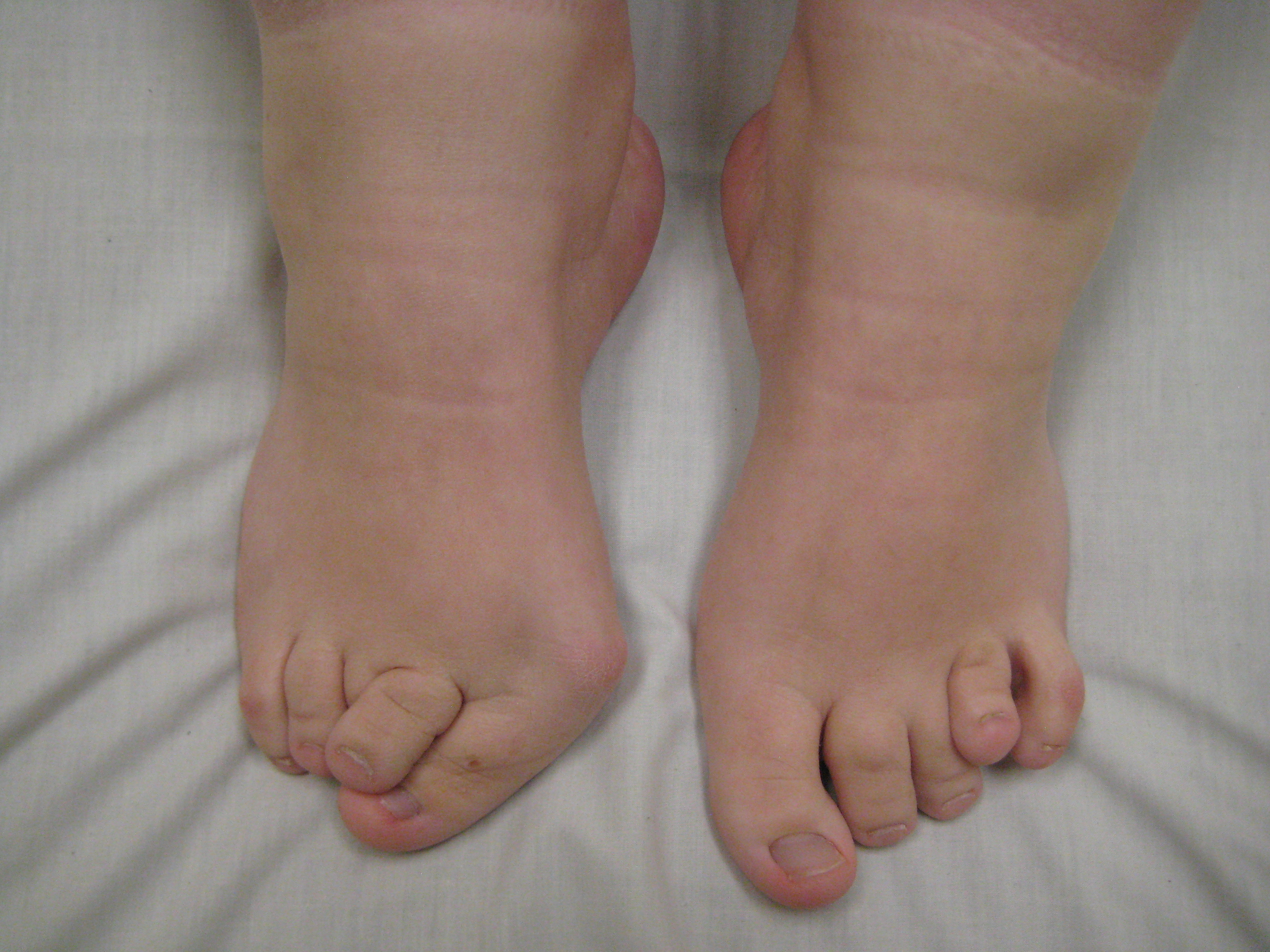
Feet of a person with Larsen syndrome: Note the small size and joint abnormalities.

=== Common symptoms ===
Symptoms are related to defects in connective tissue.

- Congenital anterior dislocation of the knees
- Dislocation of hips and shoulders
- Flattened facial appearance
- Prominent forehead
- Depressed nasal bridge
- Club foot
- Cervical kyphosis

=== Cardiac anomalies ===
Cardiac defects are similar to those associated with Marfan's syndrome, a disorder of the connective tissue.

- Elongation of aorta
- Bicuspid aortic valve
- Subaortic stenosis
- Mitral valve prolapse with mitral regurgitation
- Atrial septal defect
- Patent ductus arteriosus
- Tricuspid valve prolapse
- Aortic dissection and aneurysm
- Aneurysm of ductus arteriosus

=== Other reported symptoms ===
These symptoms were found in rare cases of Larsen syndrome.

- Cataracts
- Cleft palate
- Extra bones of wrist
- Malocclusion
- Microdontia and hypodontia
- Complete agenesis of anus
- Bifid uterus
- Bifid tongue

== Causes ==
=== Mutations in gene encoding filamin B ===
Filamins are cytoplasmic proteins that regulate the structure and activity of the cytoskeleton. These proteins serve as scaffolds on which intracellular signaling and protein trafficking are organized. Filamin B has been found to be expressed in human growth plate chondrocytes, which are especially important in vertebrae segmentation and skeleton morphogenesis. Genetic analysis of patients with Larsen syndrome has found the syndrome is caused by missense mutations in the gene that codes for filamin B. These mutations cause an accelerated rate of apoptosis in the epiphyseal growth plates of individuals with the mutation. The defects can cause short stature and other symptoms associated with Larsen syndrome.

=== Localization ===
Genetic analysis has found that a gene linked to Larsen syndrome, LAR1, is strongly linked to chromosome 3p markers. The locus of this gene is found in a region defined distally by D3S1581 and proximally by D3S1600. This location can be mapped to chromosome region 3p21.1-14.1. Human type VII collagen gene is found within this region in chromosome region 3p21.1. It is reasonable to believe that the joint abnormalities and cardiac anomalies associated with Larsen syndrome are related to the fact that the human type VII collagen gene is found within the same chromosome region as the LAR1 gene.

== Genetics ==
Both autosomal dominant and recessive forms of Larsen syndrome have been reported. The former is significantly more common than the latter. Symptoms such as syndactyly, cleft palate, short stature, and cardiac defects are seen more commonly in individuals with the autosomal recessive form of the disorder. A lethal form of the disorder has been reported. It is described as being a combination of the Larsen phenotype and pulmonary hypoplasia.

== Diagnosis ==
Ultrasound remains as one of the only effective ways of prenatally diagnosing Larsen syndrome. Prenatal diagnosis is extremely important, as it can help families prepare for the arrival of an infant with specific necessities. Ultrasound can capture prenatal images of multiple joint dislocations, abnormal positioning of legs and knees, depressed nasal bridge, prominent forehead, and club feet. These symptoms are all associated with Larsen syndrome, so they can be used to confirm that a fetus has the disorder.

== Treatment ==
Treatment for Larsen syndrome varies according to the symptoms of the individual. Orthopedic surgery can be performed to correct the serious joint defects associated with Larsen syndrome. Reconstructive surgery can be used to treat the facial abnormalities. Cervical kyphosis can be very dangerous to an individual because it can cause the vertebrae to disturb the spinal cord. Posterior cervical arthrodesis has been performed on patients with cervical kyphosis, and the results have been successful Propranolol has been used to treat some of the cardiac defects associated with Marfan's syndrome, so the drug also has been suggested to treat cardiac defects associated with Larsen syndrome.

== Prognosis ==
While Larsen syndrome can be lethal if untreated, the prognosis is relatively good if individuals are treated with orthopedic surgery, physical therapy, and other procedures used to treat the symptoms linked with Larsen syndrome.

== See also ==
- Boomerang dysplasia
