= Woodcourt College =

School in Sydney, Australia

Woodcourt College was an independent Anglican single-sex primary and secondary day and boarding school for girls, located in Wardell Road on the boundary between Marrickville and Dulwich, inner western suburbs of Sydney, New South Wales, Australia. The school was also known as Dulwich Hill Ladies College and Kindergarten. The school opened in 1905 and closed in 1935; its records are held by the State Library of New South Wales.

== Overview ==
Built as a private residence in 1885, Woodcourt was opened by Grace Hunt, a trained teacher, in 1905. Grace Matilda Hunt (née Henderson) (d.1946) was born in Germany. She was the widow of Harold Wesley George Hunt (died 1903) and had a young family of three, including, a future professor, Harold Arthur Kinross Hunt (died 1977). Woodcourt was acquired by the Anglican Church of Australia in 1919 and became a diocesan school with Hunt remaining as principal until her retirement in 1929. It enrolled both day girls and boarders from kindergarten to the leaving certificate. At its peak, the school had about 150 students and its colours were gold and brown. Internal renovations were made to the buildings in 1929 before Bessie Foster became Headmistress in 1930. When Woodcourt College closed, the land was subdivided and the house was later demolished for apartments.

== Notable alumnae ==
- Phyllis Katherine Fraser Mullens, a nurse

== See also ==
- List of non-government schools in New South Wales
- List of boarding schools
