= FILIP1 =

Protein-coding gene in the species Homo sapiens

Identifiers
- Aliases: FILIP1, FILIP, filamin A interacting protein 1
- External IDs: OMIM: 607307; MGI: 1917848; HomoloGene: 6700; GeneCards: FILIP1; OMA:FILIP1 - orthologs

Gene location (Human)
| Chr. | Chromosome 6 (human) |
| Band | 6q14.1 | Start | 75,291,859 bp |
| Band | 6q14.1 | End | 75,493,800 bp |

Gene location (Mouse)
| Chr. | Chromosome 9 (mouse) |
| Band | 9|9 E1 | Start | 79,712,376 bp |
| Band | 9|9 E1 | End | 79,920,133 bp |
RNA expression pattern
| Bgee | Human / Mouse (ortholog); Top expressed in: myocardium of left ventricle; cardiac muscle tissue of right atrium; tibialis anterior muscle; deltoid muscle; right ventricle; Skeletal muscle tissue of rectus abdominis; biceps brachii; quadriceps femoris muscle; vastus lateralis muscle; Skeletal muscle tissue of biceps brachii / Top expressed in: interventricular septum; muscle of thigh; sciatic nerve; ascending aorta; left ventricle; iris; aortic valve; otolith organ; utricle; myocardium of ventricle; More reference expression data |
| BioGPS | n/a |
Orthologs
| Species | Human | Mouse |
| Entrez | 27145 | 70598 |
| Ensembl | ENSG00000118407 | ENSMUSG00000034898 |
| UniProt | Q7Z7B0 | Q9CS72 |
| RefSeq (mRNA) | NM_001289987; NM_001300866; NM_015687 | NM_001081243; NM_001357352; NM_001357353; NM_001357354 |
| RefSeq (protein) | NP_001276916; NP_001287795; NP_056502 | n/a |
| Location (UCSC) | Chr 6: 75.29 – 75.49 Mb | Chr 9: 79.71 – 79.92 Mb |
| PubMed search |
- Wikidata
| View/Edit Human | View/Edit Mouse |

Filamin-A-interacting protein 1, abbreviated as FILIP1, is a protein that in humans is encoded by the FILIP1 gene.

== Interactions ==
FILIP1 has been shown to interact with Filamin.
