= FERMT2 =

Protein-coding gene in the species Homo sapiens

Identifiers
- Aliases: FERMT2, KIND2, MIG2, PLEKHC1, UNC112, UNC112B, mig-2, fermitin family member 2, URP2SF, FERM domain containing kindlin 2
- External IDs: OMIM: 607746; MGI: 2385001; GeneCards: FERMT2
Available structures
PDB	Ortholog search: PDBe RCSB
PDB	List of PDB id codes 2LGX, 2LKO, 2MSU, 4F7H

Gene location (Human)
Chr.	Chromosome 14 (human)
Band	14q22.1	Start	52,857,268 bp
Band	14q22.1	End	52,952,435 bp

Gene location (Mouse)
Chr.	Chromosome 14 (mouse)
Band	14|14 C1	Start	45,696,252 bp
Band	14|14 C1	End	45,767,575 bp
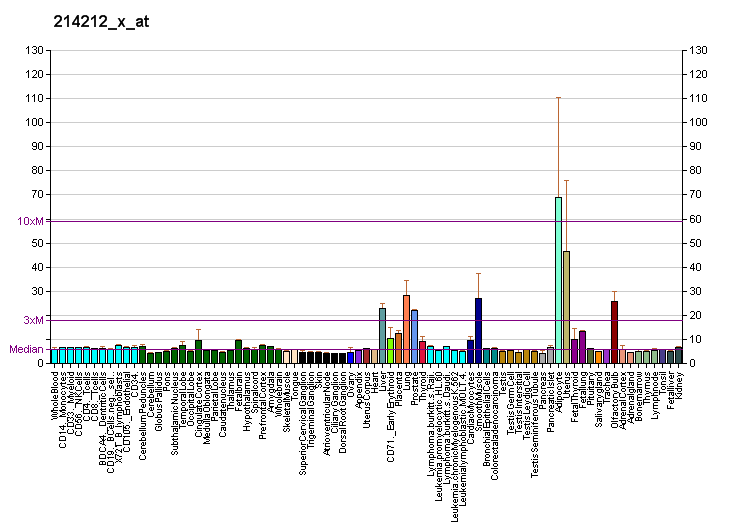

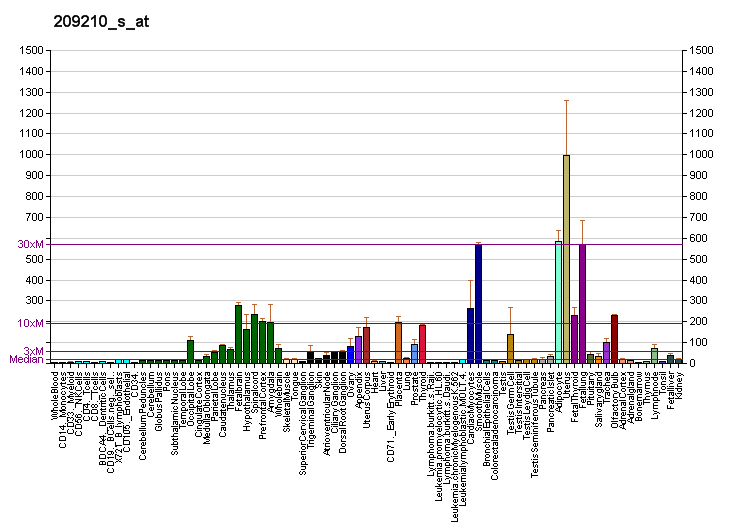

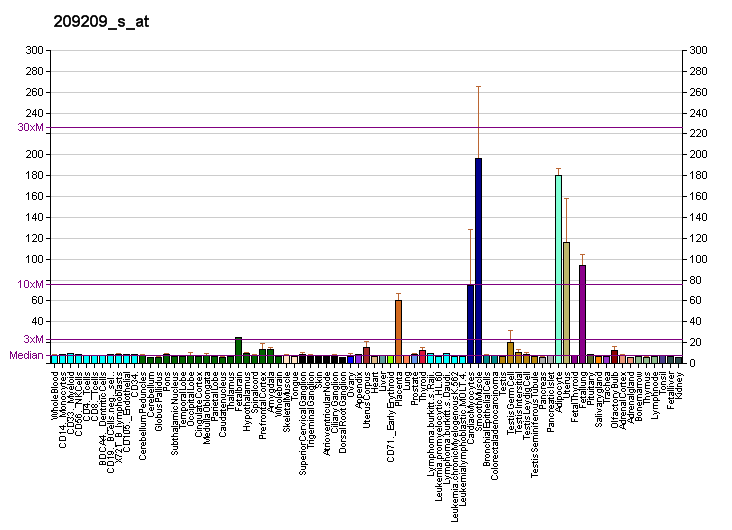
RNA expression pattern
Bgee	Human / Mouse (ortholog); Top expressed in: decidua; tail of epididymis; metanephric glomerulus; saphenous vein; cartilage tissue; parietal pleura; seminal vesicula; visceral pleura; tibia; secondary oocyte / Top expressed in: left lung; left lung lobe; ankle; right lung lobe; vastus lateralis muscle; triceps brachii muscle; sternocleidomastoid muscle; tail of embryo; temporal muscle; digastric muscle; More reference expression data
BioGPS	More reference expression data
Gene ontology
Molecular function	protein binding; phosphatidylinositol-3,4,5-trisphosphate binding; lipid binding; actin filament binding
Cellular component	cytoplasm; filamentous actin; cytosol; cell projection; membrane; I band; focal adhesion; extrinsic component of cytoplasmic side of plasma membrane; plasma membrane; stress fiber; nucleoplasm; cell surface; cell junction; cell cortex; cytoskeleton; lamellipodium membrane; nucleus
Biological process	protein localization to membrane; Wnt signaling pathway; focal adhesion assembly; cell adhesion; regulation of cell shape; integrin-mediated signaling pathway; substrate adhesion-dependent cell spreading; integrin activation; cell-matrix adhesion; transforming growth factor beta receptor signaling pathway; cell junction assembly
Sources:Amigo / QuickGO
Orthologs
Databases	NCBI: entry; OMA: entry
Species	Human	Mouse
Entrez	10979	218952
Ensembl	ENSG00000073712	ENSMUSG00000037712
UniProt	Q96AC1	Q8CIB5
RefSeq (mRNA)	NM_001134999; NM_001135000; NM_006832	NM_146054; NM_001360525; NM_001360526
RefSeq (protein)	NP_001128471; NP_001128472; NP_006823	NP_666166; NP_001347454; NP_001347455
Location (UCSC)	Chr 14: 52.86 – 52.95 Mb	Chr 14: 45.7 – 45.77 Mb
PubMed search
- Wikidata
View/Edit Human	View/Edit Mouse

Fermitin family homolog 2 (FERMT2) also known as pleckstrin homology domain-containing family C member 1 (PLEKHC1) or kindlin-2 is a protein that in humans is encoded by the FERMT2 gene.

Kindlin-2 is the first of the kindlin protein to be discovered in 1994. It was detected in a screen for epidermal growth factor (EGF)-induced mRNAs and initially named mitogen-inducible gene 2 (Mig-2) protein.

== Function ==
FERMT2 is a component of extracellular matrix structures in mammalian cells and is required for proper control of cell shape change.

A major task of kindlins is to regulate the activation of integrins.

== Interactions ==
FERMT2 has been shown to interact with FBLIM1.

== Role in health and diseases ==
- Loss of kindlin-2 in mice leads to peri-implantation lethality.
- Kindlin-2 is highly expressed in activated myofibroblasts for regulation of focal adhesion formation.
- Deletion of Kindlin-2 retards insulin secretion and reduces β-cell mass in mice.
- Elevated kindlin-2 expression was observed in tubular intestinal fibrosis of the kidney, a condition is characterized by massive expansion of the cortical interstitium, conversion of fibroblasts into myofibroblasts and progressive EMT of tubular epithelial cells.
- Kindlin-2 is required for angiogenesis and blood vessel homeostasis.
- Kindlin-2 can exert tumor-promoting or tumor-inhibiting functions based on tumor-type-dependent.
- FERMT2 modulates the Alzheimer's Disease risk by regulating APP metabolism and Aβ peptide production.
