= Harold Hunt (professor) =

Australian academic

Harold Arthur Kinross Hunt FAHA (16 March 1903 – 11 April 1977) was an Australian educationist who was Professor of Classical Studies at the University of Melbourne and Dean of the Faculty of Arts. He was a Foundation Fellow of the Australian Academy of the Humanities.

== Early life ==
Hunt was born at Dubbo, New South Wales, the third child of Harold Wesley George Hunt (1867-1903), founder and Headmaster of Dubbo Boys Grammar School, and his wife Grace Matilda (née Henderson). He was three months old when his father died and his mother then trained as a teacher. She later founded Woodcourt College in the Sydney suburb of Marrickville. He attended his father's alma mater, Newington College, from 1916 until 1920, under C. J. Prescott. In 1920, he won the Wigram Allen Scholarship, endowed by Sir George Wigram Allen, for classics, with Herbert Dadswell receiving it for mathematics. At the end of 1920 Hunt was named Dux of the College and received the Schofield Scholarship. He went up to the University of Sydney and in 1921 and graduated as a Bachelor of Arts with first-class honours in classics. He also won the university medal and the Cooper Travelling Scholarship, which enabled him to take a Master of Arts at Queen's College, Oxford in 1926.

== Schoolmaster ==
Upon graduation, Hunt was appointed by Melbourne Grammar School headmaster R. P. Franklin to teach classics and completed a Diploma of Education in 1929 at the University of Melbourne. In 1931 he became senior classics master and whilst at "Grammar" was involved in debating, rowing, rifle-shooting and the cadet corps. He married Gwendolen Dinah Fulton Jones in 1928.

== University career ==
In 1936, Hunt was appointed to the University of Melbourne as lecturer in classics. He was promoted to senior lecturer in 1945 and associate-professor in 1949. In 1955 he made Professor of Classical Studies. Hunt was awarded a Litt.D. by the university in 1950. He was Dean of the Faculty of Arts and served as a member of the university council from 1952 until 1955.

== War service ==
Hunt served with the Citizen Military Forces in 1942 and then became an intelligence officer with the Australian Imperial Force until 1943. Rising to the rank of Captain, he devised an intensive course in the instruction of the Japanese language for Australian soldiers

== Publications ==
He wrote Training through Latin in 1948 and other technical publications with the Australian Council for Educational Research, between 1962 and 1965. His doctoral thesis, The Humanism of Cicero, was published 1954. After retiring, Hunt published The Story of Rotary in Australia (1971), The Professor and the Possum (1973), The Master Printers of Sydney (1976) and A Physical Interpretation of the Universe: The Doctrines of Zeno the Stoic (1976). Cicero and Virgil (1972) is a festschrift for Hunt edited by John Martyn.
