= Atelosteogenesis type I =

- Other names: Spondylo-humero-femoral dysplasia
- Autosomal dominant pattern is the inheritance manner of this condition
- Specialty: Medical genetics

Atelosteogenesis type I is a rare autosomal dominant condition. This condition is evident at birth and is associated with a very poor prognosis for the baby. It may be diagnosed antenatally.

== Signs and symptoms ==
Clinical features include

- Abnormal facies
  - Prominent forehead
  - Hypertelorism
  - Depressed nasal bridge with a grooved tip
  - Micrognathia
  - Cleft palate
- Severe short limbed dwarfism
- Joint dislocations (hip, knee and elbow joints)
- Club feet
- Cardiorespiratory failure

Cardiorespiratory failure is due to pulmonary hypoplasia or tracheobronchial hypoplasia.

== Causes ==
This condition is caused by mutations in the filamin B (FLNB) gene.

== Diagnosis ==
This condition is evident at birth and may be diagnosed antenatally with ultrasound or magnetic resonance imaging. The infants may be still born. Those that are live born do not survive long.

Radiological findings include

- Severe platyspondyly
- Distally tapered, shortened, incomplete or absent humeri and femurs
- Shortened or bowed radii, ulnas and tibias
- Hypoplastic pelvis and fibulas
- Deficient ossification of the metacarpals, middle and proximal phalanges

=== Differential diagnosis ===
This includes

- Achondroplasia
- Achondrogenesis
- Atelosteogenesis III
- Boomerang dysplasia
- Campomelic dysplasia
- Ellis–Van Creveld syndrome
- Hypophosphatasia
- Melnick Needles syndrome
- Metatropic dysplasia
- Osteogenesis imperfecta
- Roberts syndrome
- Short-rib polydactyly syndrome
- Thanatophoric dysplasia

== History ==
This condition was first described by Maroteaux et al. in 1982.
