= FBLIM1 =

Protein-coding gene in humans

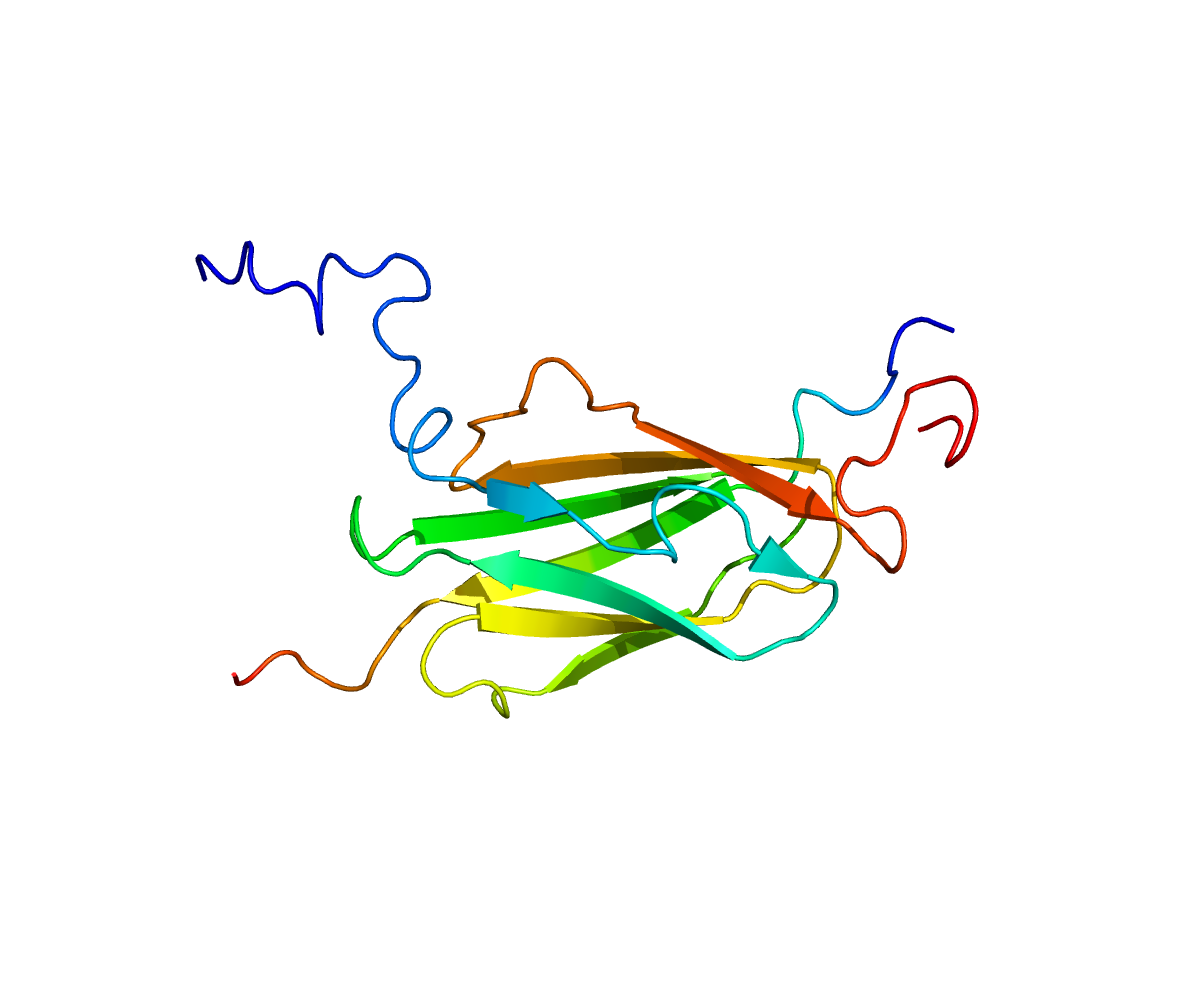

Identifiers
- Aliases: FBLIM1, CAL, FBLP-1, FBLP1, filamin binding LIM protein 1
- External IDs: OMIM: 607747; MGI: 1921452; GeneCards: FBLIM1
Available structures
PDB	Ortholog search: PDBe RCSB
PDB	List of PDB id codes 2K9U, 2W0P, 4P3W

Gene location (Human)
Chr.	Chromosome 1 (human)
Band	1p36.21	Start	15,756,607 bp
Band	1p36.21	End	15,786,594 bp

Gene location (Mouse)
Chr.	Chromosome 4 (mouse)
Band	4|4 D3	Start	141,303,373 bp
Band	4|4 D3	End	141,333,407 bp
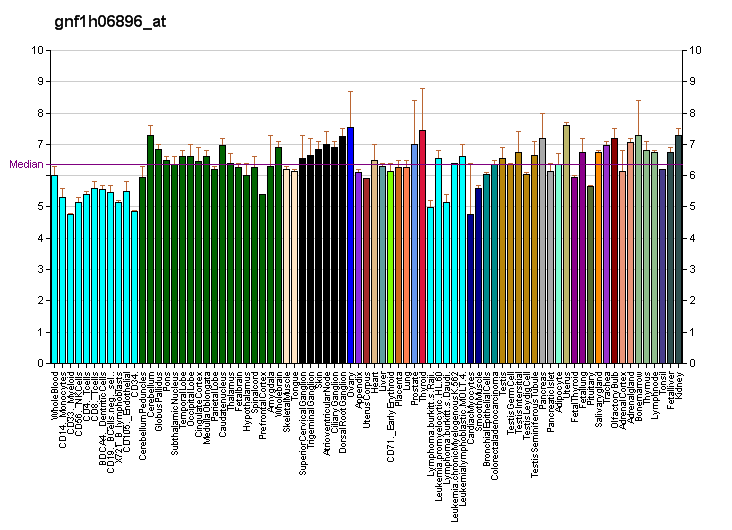
RNA expression pattern
Bgee	Human / Mouse (ortholog); Top expressed in: right coronary artery; Descending thoracic aorta; ascending aorta; mucosa of ileum; popliteal artery; tibial arteries; cardiac muscle tissue of right atrium; saphenous vein; pancreatic ductal cell; left coronary artery / Top expressed in: interventricular septum; ascending aorta; tunica media of zone of aorta; aortic valve; myocardium of ventricle; right ventricle; genital tubercle; cardiac muscles; epithelium of stomach; left colon; More reference expression data
BioGPS	More reference expression data
Gene ontology
Molecular function	filamin binding; protein binding; metal ion binding
Cellular component	cytoplasm; cytosol; cell cortex; cytoskeleton; stress fiber; focal adhesion; fibrillar center; cell junction
Biological process	regulation of integrin activation; cell adhesion; cell junction assembly; regulation of cell shape; cell-cell adhesion
Sources:Amigo / QuickGO
Orthologs
Databases	NCBI: entry; OMA: entry
Species	Human	Mouse
Entrez	54751	74202
Ensembl	ENSG00000162458	ENSMUSG00000006219
UniProt	Q8WUP2	Q71FD7
RefSeq (mRNA)	NM_001024215; NM_001024216; NM_017556; NM_001350151	NM_001163256; NM_133754; NM_001378958; NM_001378959
RefSeq (protein)	NP_001019386; NP_001019387; NP_060026; NP_001337080	NP_001156728; NP_598515; NP_001365887; NP_001365888; NP_001391569 NP_001391570; NP_001391571; NP_001391572; NP_001391573
Location (UCSC)	Chr 1: 15.76 – 15.79 Mb	Chr 4: 141.3 – 141.33 Mb
PubMed search
- Wikidata
View/Edit Human	View/Edit Mouse

Filamin-binding LIM protein 1 is a protein that in humans is encoded by the FBLIM1 gene.

This gene encodes a protein with an N-terminal filamin-binding domain, a central proline-rich domain, and, multiple C-terminal LIM domains. This protein localizes at cell junctions and may link cell adhesion structures to the actin cytoskeleton. This protein may be involved in the assembly and stabilization of actin filaments and likely plays a role in modulating cell adhesion, cell morphology and cell motility. This protein also localizes to the nucleus and may affect cardiomyocyte differentiation after binding with the NKX2-5 transcription factor. Alternative splicing results in multiple transcript variants encoding different isoforms.

== Interactions ==
FBLIM1 has been shown to interact with filamin, PLEKHC1 and FLNB.
