= Richard Penrose Franklin =

Australian schoolmaster and educationist (1884–1942)

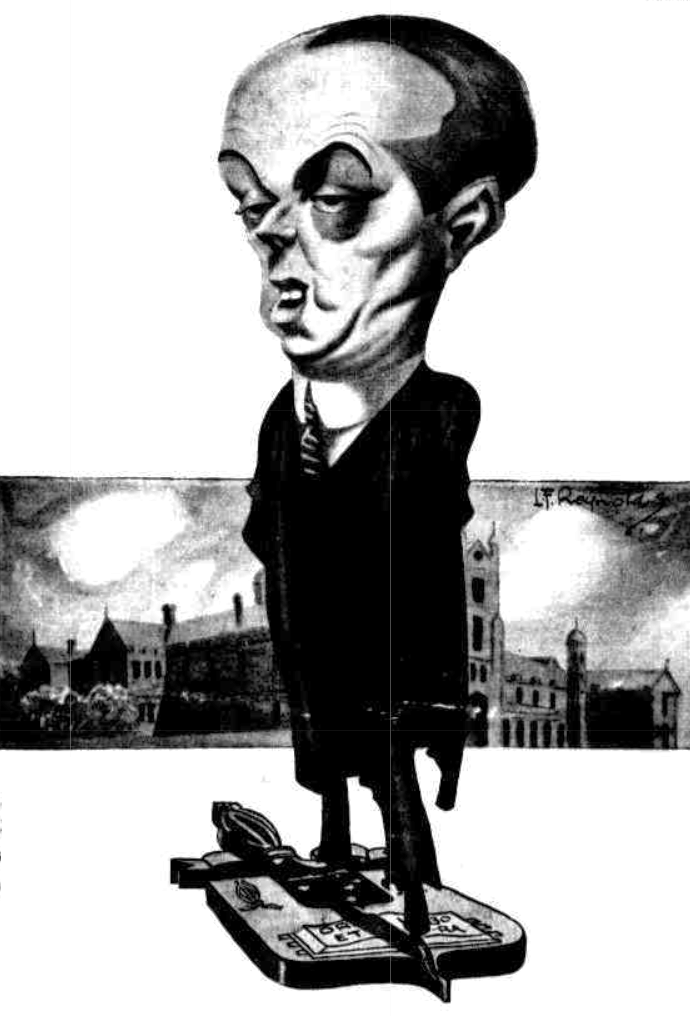
1927 caricature by Reynolds

Richard Penrose Franklin (28 November 1884 – 12 October 1942) was an Australian schoolmaster and educationist. He served as headmaster of Melbourne Grammar School from 1915 to 1936.

== History ==
Franklin was born on 28 November 1884, at Surbiton, London, the son of Julia Reed Franklin, née Gould and Samuel Franklin, a London solicitor. He was educated at Borlase School, Marlow, and at St. Paul's School, London, where he distinguished himself both scholastically and on the sports field, being both captain of the school and a member of the school's cricket and football teams 1903–1904. In 1904, he enrolled with Pembroke College, Cambridge, where he achieved first-class honors in classical Tripos and graduated MA.

In 1908, he emigrated to Melbourne, Australia to join the firm of Dalgety & Co but finding his interests lay elsewhere, in late 1910 joined the teaching staff of the Geelong Church of England Grammar School. In 1909, he joined Sydney Church of England Grammar School ("Shore") as senior housemaster and senior classical master, whose school magazine Torchbearer, gave him a high encomium. His brother Charles Franklin was also a teacher there. In 1915, he successfully applied for the position of headmaster of Melbourne Grammar School, inducted 21 September, then in 1916 enlisted with the First AIF and served overseas, Henry Girdlestone acting headmaster in his absence. He returned in 1919 as Lieut. Franklin, and served at Melbourne Grammar until 24 June 1936, when he retired on medical advice. During his time at "Grammar" the school roll had doubled and two important buildings, Grimwade House and Creswick House, had been added by donation.

As an educator, he placed high importance on the "Classics" (Latin and Greek), appointing such eminent scholars as Carl Kaeppel and Harold Hunt to teach those subjects, to the detriment of modern studies, some averred.

A tall (well over 6 feet (180 cm), and nicknamed "Lofty") athletically built man, Franklin coached high jump, long jump and hurdles to good effect, some noted schoolboy athletes being Jack Park, Alf Watson and Donald F. McLardy (hurdles), and Frank Woodhouse (pole vault).

He was president of the Head Masters' Association and the Head Masters' Conference of Australia. He was also vice-chairman of the Soldiers' Children's Education Board, and a prominent member of the Victorian Council of Public Education.

He died at his home in Toorak, on 12 October 1942, aged 57. His remains were cremated at Spring Vale cemetery. He never married.

Major Reginald Norris Franklin DSO (c. 1882 – 6 July 1919) of the 2nd (Queensland) Light Horse, who saw service in Gallipoli and Egypt, was a brother. Another brother was an instructor at the Naval College.
