= Benjamin Mendes da Costa =

English merchant and philanthropist

Benjamin Mendes da Costa (17 July 1803 - 26 November 1868) was an English merchant and philanthropist. Da Costa was born in Enfield, London, to Benjamin Mendes da Costa and his second wife, Louisa. Although da Costa's father was a Jew, the children of his second marriage were brought up as members of the Church of England.

In July 1840, da Costa emigrated to the newly settled colony of South Australia, becoming a successful merchant on Hindley Street. He acquired 6 acres (2.4 ha) of land in the city centre, as well as fifteen country sections. He was elected to the committee of the Merchant's Institute and became good friends with the colonial chaplain, James Farrell, and Bishop Augustus Short. Da Costa left the colony in 1848, returning to London. He died of lung cancer in November 1868.

Throughout Da Costa's life, he made many friends and supported St Peter's College, Adelaide. His success brought the school's great wealth.

Da Costa's best friend, Gerard Owen was another successful English Merchant. However, Owen did not move to Adelaide and stayed in England to live a happy life.

In his will, da Costa bequeathed his South Australian landholdings to St Peter's College, Adelaide. The estate was subject to the life interests of ten relations; the last died in 1910, upon which time the property was vested in the school. St Peter's has named a hall, a house and a scholarship in his honour.
