= Carl Henry Kaeppel =

Australian scholar (1887–1946)

- Born: Carl Henry Kaeppel; 13 January 1887; Mittagong, New South Wales, Australia
- Died: 6 December 1946 (aged 59); Lewisham, New South Wales, Australia
- Known for: Classical language scholar

Carl Henry Kaeppel MC BA (13 January 1887 – 6 December 1946), generally referred to as Carl Kaeppel, was an Australian scholar of Classical languages and geography.

== History ==
Kaeppel was born at Nattai near Mittagong, New South Wales, a son of (Carl William) Herbert Kaeppel (c. 1855 – 22 January 1888) and Emily Annette Kaeppel, née Edwards ( – 12 August 1927). His father died when Kaeppel was one year old.

Kaeppel was educated at Sydney Grammar School, of which he was captain in 1905, and at Sydney University, where he graduated BA with first-class honours in Classics in 1910. He had won the Salting exhibition, Cooper scholarship, and Cooper travelling scholarship, which entitled him to go to Oxford, but illness prevented him from taking up the opportunity; instead he was able to undertake a long tour of Europe, studying languages. He returned to Australia, serving as a master at Sydney Grammar School ("Shore") for some years, then at The Armidale School, Armidale.

He enlisted with the First Australian Imperial Force in January 1916. In mid-March, as Lieutenant Kaeppel, he left Australia to serve in World War I with the 18th Battalion. He was promoted to captain and adjutant, was mentioned in dispatches and won the Military Cross.

He worked at the British Museum on early geographic texts, and did a course in anthropology at London University under Professor Seligman.

Kaeppel travelled extensively in Europe and learned eleven languages, but was not a polyglot.

He returned to Australia, where by 1922 he had been appointed senior classics master at Melbourne Grammar School by headmaster R. P. Franklin, a close friend (they had taught together at "Shore"), but in 1931 was forced to leave on account of his heavy drinking. He moved to Sydney, where he survived by tutoring privately.

Kaeppel engaged in research on Classical geography and anthropology, and articles based on this work, read before the Classical Association of Victoria, were published as Off the Beaten Track in the Classics in 1936. He converted to the Roman Catholic faith that same year, and devoted the last years of his life to Catholic education, teaching at Marist Brothers' High School, Darlinghurst (280–296 Liverpool Street, since demolished), and St Vincent's College, Potts Point. He edited a regular page on education for The Catholic Weekly.

He died in Lewisham Private Hospital, aged 59. Requiem Mass was celebrated at St Canice's Church, Darlinghurst, and his remains were buried in Waverley Cemetery.

== Personal ==
Kaeppel married Muriel Beatrice Bailie on 8 January 1916. She left him while he was overseas and they divorced in 1920.

== Character ==
According to reports, Kaeppel was a reliable and lovable individual who valued knowledge in its pure form. He was a voracious reader, retaining and cross-referencing a great deal of information. He carried in his head the makings of many books, although he only completed a small number. He was considered a welcome conversationalist and a writer and spoke on a range of subjects on ABC radio. A regular at the Savage and Naval and Military clubs, he was a hard drinker. He was considered lacking in worldly ambition and died virtually penniless, his death having perhaps been hastened by his being gassed during the war.

== Recognition ==
Following an anonymous benefaction, annual prizes for study in the classics, known as the Carl Kaeppel Memorial Prize, were instituted at the Marist Brothers' High School, Darlinghurst.

== Publications ==
- Carl Kaeppel (1932). A Short History of Latin Literature. The Shakespeare Head Press.
- Carl Kaeppel (1936). Off the Beaten Track in the Classics.
- Carl Kaeppel (ed.). Caesar, Gallic War. Book V. Shakespeare Head Press. Used by State Education Departments.
