= Nephrocystin-1 =

Protein found in humans

NPHP1
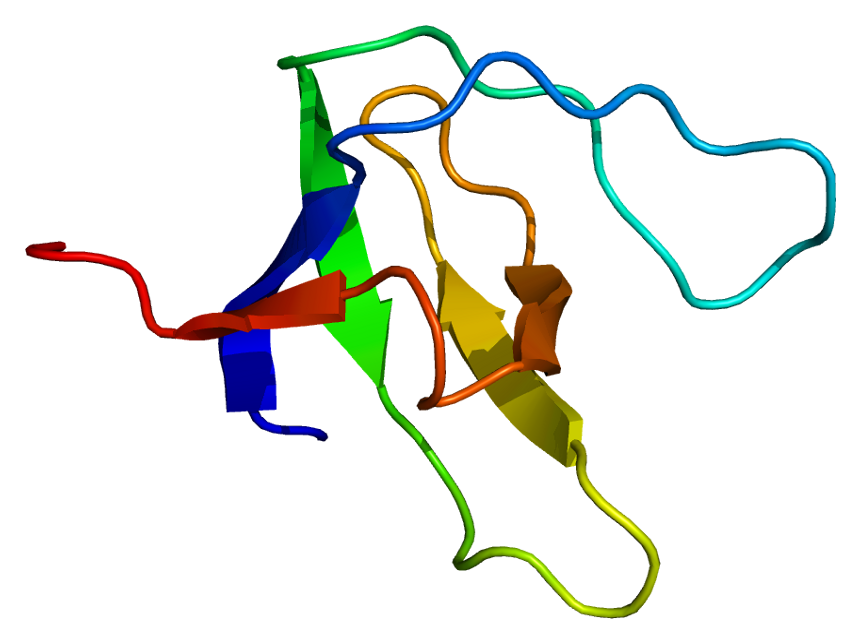

Identifiers
- Aliases: NPHP1, JBTS4, NPH1, SLSN1, nephrocystin 1
- External IDs: OMIM: 607100; MGI: 1858233; GeneCards: NPHP1
Available structures
PDB	Ortholog search: PDBe RCSB
PDB	List of PDB id codes 1S1N

Gene location (Human)
Chr.	Chromosome 2 (human)
Band	2q13	Start	110,122,311 bp
Band	2q13	End	110,205,066 bp

Gene location (Mouse)
Chr.	Chromosome 2 (mouse)
Band	2|2 F1	Start	127,582,652 bp
Band	2|2 F1	End	127,630,817 bp
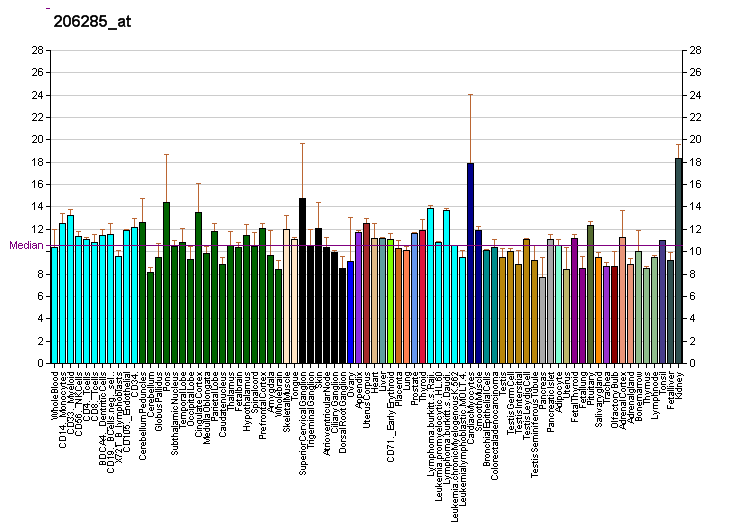
RNA expression pattern
Bgee	Human / Mouse (ortholog); Top expressed in: right uterine tube; bronchial epithelial cell; olfactory zone of nasal mucosa; muscle of thigh; left testis; right testis; anterior pituitary; buccal mucosa cell; gonad; gastrocnemius muscle / Top expressed in: spermatocyte; spermatid; seminiferous tubule; esophagus; Epithelium of choroid plexus; coelomic epithelium; extensor digitorum longus muscle; utricle; right kidney; proximal tubule; More reference expression data
BioGPS	More reference expression data
Gene ontology
Molecular function	structural molecule activity; protein binding
Cellular component	cytoplasm; cytosol; cell projection; membrane; cell-cell junction; bicellular tight junction; adherens junction; cilium; photoreceptor connecting cilium; cell junction; motile cilium; cytoskeleton; ciliary transition zone
Biological process	cell differentiation; excretion; spermatid differentiation; cell projection organization; retina development in camera-type eye; spermatogenesis; actin cytoskeleton organization; signal transduction; visual behavior; positive regulation of bicellular tight junction assembly; ciliary basal body-plasma membrane docking; cell-cell adhesion
Sources:Amigo / QuickGO
Orthologs
Databases	NCBI: entry; OMA: entry
Species	Human	Mouse
Entrez	4867	53885
Ensembl	ENSG00000144061	ENSMUSG00000027378
UniProt	O15259	Q9QY53
RefSeq (mRNA)	NM_000272; NM_001128178; NM_001128179; NM_207181; NM_001374256 NM_001374257	NM_001291012; NM_001291013; NM_016902; NM_001355429; NM_001369236
RefSeq (protein)	NP_000263; NP_001121650; NP_001121651; NP_997064; NP_001361185 NP_001361186	NP_001277941; NP_001277942; NP_058598; NP_001342358; NP_001356165
Location (UCSC)	Chr 2: 110.12 – 110.21 Mb	Chr 2: 127.58 – 127.63 Mb
PubMed search
- Wikidata
View/Edit Human	View/Edit Mouse

Nephrocystin-1 is a protein that in humans is encoded by the NPHP1 gene (previously NPH1).

== Function ==
This gene encodes a protein with src homology domain 3 (SH3) patterns. Mutations in this gene cause familial juvenile nephronophthisis.

== Interactions ==
NPHP1 has been shown to interact with BCAR1, PTK2B, Filamin and INVS.
