= Inversin =

Protein found in humans

INVS

Identifiers
- Aliases: INVS, INV, NPH2, NPHP2, inversin
- External IDs: OMIM: 243305; MGI: 1335082; GeneCards: INVS

Gene location (Human)
Chr.	Chromosome 9 (human)
Band	9q31.1	Start	100,099,243 bp
Band	9q31.1	End	100,302,175 bp

Gene location (Mouse)
Chr.	Chromosome 4 (mouse)
Band	4 B1|4 26.11 cM	Start	48,279,760 bp
Band	4 B1|4 26.11 cM	End	48,431,954 bp
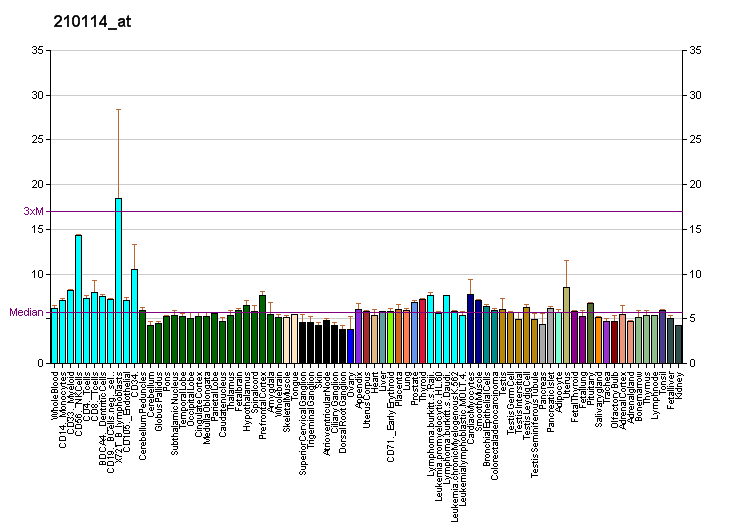
RNA expression pattern
Bgee	Human / Mouse (ortholog); Top expressed in: Achilles tendon; sural nerve; gonad; pancreatic ductal cell; sperm; left ovary; right lobe of liver; ventricular zone; testicle; stromal cell of endometrium / Top expressed in: saccule; lumbar spinal ganglion; fossa; vestibular membrane of cochlear duct; pituitary gland; tail of embryo; Ileal epithelium; condyle; aortic valve; ciliary body; More reference expression data
BioGPS	More reference expression data
Gene ontology
Molecular function	protein binding; calmodulin binding
Cellular component	cytoplasm; spindle; cell projection; cilium; microtubule; cytoskeleton; membrane; nucleus
Biological process	multicellular organism development; Wnt signaling pathway; negative regulation of canonical Wnt signaling pathway
Sources:Amigo / QuickGO
Orthologs
Databases	NCBI: entry; OMA: entry
Species	Human	Mouse
Entrez	27130	16348
Ensembl	ENSG00000119509	ENSMUSG00000028344
UniProt	Q9Y283; Q2M1I4	O89019
RefSeq (mRNA)	NM_014425; NM_183245; NM_001318381; NM_001318382	NM_001281977; NM_001281978; NM_010569
RefSeq (protein)	NP_001305310; NP_001305311; NP_055240; NP_001305310.1	n/a
Location (UCSC)	Chr 9: 100.1 – 100.3 Mb	Chr 4: 48.28 – 48.43 Mb
PubMed search
- Wikidata
View/Edit Human	View/Edit Mouse

Inversin, also called Nephrocystin-2, is a protein that in humans is encoded by the INVS gene (previously NPHP2).

This gene encodes a protein containing multiple ankyrin domains and two IQ calmodulin-binding domains. The encoded protein may function in renal tubular development and function, and in left-right axis determination. This protein interacts with nephrocystin and infers a connection between primary cilia function and left-right axis determination. A similar protein in mice interacts with calmodulin. Mutations in this gene have been associated with nephronophthisis type 2. Two transcript variants encoding distinct isoforms have been identified for this gene.

== Interactions ==
INVS has been shown to interact with NPHP1.
