= Boomerang dysplasia =

- Other names: Dwarfism with short, bowed, rigid limbs and characteristic facies
- Boomerang dysplasia has an autosomal dominant pattern of inheritance.
- Specialty: Medical genetics
- Differential diagnosis: Larsen syndrome, Greenberg dysplasia, Spondylocarpotarsal synostosis syndrome
- Frequency: 1.282907e-07%

Boomerang dysplasia is a lethal form of osteochondrodysplasia known for a characteristic congenital feature in which bones of the arms and legs are malformed into the shape of a boomerang. Death usually occurs in early infancy due to complications arising from overwhelming systemic bone malformations.

Osteochondrodysplasias are skeletal disorders that cause malformations of both bone and cartilage.

== Presentation ==
Prenatal and neonatal diagnosis of boomerang dysplasia includes several prominent features found in other osteochondrodysplasias, though the "boomerang" malformation seen in the long bones is the delineating factor.

Featured symptoms of boomerang dysplasia include: dwarfism (a lethal type of infantile dwarfism caused by systemic bone deformities), underossification (lack of bone formation) in the limbs, spine and ilium (pelvis); proliferation of multinucleated giant-cell chondrocytes (cells that produce cartilage and play a role in skeletal development - chondrocytes of this type are rarely found in osteochondrodysplasias), brachydactyly (shortened fingers) and micromelia (undersized, shortened bones).

The characteristic "boomerang" malformation presents intermittently among random absences of long bones throughout the skeleton, in affected individuals. For example, one individual may have an absent radius and fibula, with the "boomerang" formation found in both ulnas and tibias. Another patient may present "boomerang" femora, and an absent tibia.

== Cause ==
Mutations in the Filamin B (FLNB) gene cause boomerang dysplasia. FLNB is a cytoplasmic protein that regulates intracellular communication and signalling by cross-linking the protein actin to allow direct communication between the cell membrane and cytoskeletal network, to control and guide proper skeletal development. Disruptions in this pathway, caused by FLNB mutations, result in the bone and cartilage abnormalities associated with boomerang dysplasia.

Chondrocytes, which also have a role in bone development, are susceptible to these disruptions and either fail to undergo ossification, or ossify incorrectly.

FLNB mutations are involved in a spectrum of lethal bone dysplasias. One such disorder, atelosteogenesis type I, is very similar to boomerang dysplasia, and several symptoms of both often overlap.

== Genetics ==
Early journal reports of boomerang dysplasia suggested X-linked recessive inheritance, based on observation and family history. It was later discovered, however, that the disorder is actually caused by a sporadic genetic mutation fitting an autosomal dominant genetic profile.

Autosomal dominant inheritance indicates that the defective gene responsible for a disorder is located on an autosome, and only one copy of the gene is sufficient to cause the disorder, when inherited from a parent who has the disorder.

Boomerang dysplasia, although an autosomal dominant disorder, is not inherited because those afflicted do not live beyond infancy. They cannot pass the gene to the next generation.

== See also ==
- Larsen syndrome
