= Henry Girdlestone =

Rev. Henry Girdlestone, M.A. (5 July 1863 – 29 June 1926), often referred to as Canon Girdlestone, was head master of St Peter's College from 1894 to 1916 and of Melbourne Grammar School from 1917 to 1919.

== History ==
Girdlestone was born at Penkridge, Staffordshire, the eldest son of Eliza Jane Girdlestone, née Webb and Henry Girdlestone, a Church of England clergyman. He grew up at the rectory of Bathampton and was educated at Bath College and Magdalen College, Oxford University, where he graduated BA and MA and rowed for Oxford. In 1888 he returned to Bath College as a tutor, and was briefly a private tutor to one of the Lords Ashtown. In 1891 he entered holy orders in the Diocese of Bath and Wells and was ordained in 1892.

In 1893 Bishop Kennion was in England recruiting teaching staff for St Peter's College, Adelaide, and Girdlestone successfully applied for the position of headmaster. Years later he would joke that Kennion was more impressed with the fact that he had rowed stroke for Oxford in 1885 and 1886 than his other credentials. He commenced his duties in the first term of 1894, and his influence was immediately felt. His love of sport and good sportsmanship was infectious, and he gained additional respect by his own record and athletic ability. Rowing became one of the chief features of the school's sporting calendar. Enrolments, and indeed student numbers, which had stagnated during the reign of his predecessor, P. E. Raynor, immediately improved: when he took charge the College had 170 students; a year later there were 202; in succeeding years 275, 310, 347 . . . and in 1916 when he retired there were 450. Nor did he neglect the school's traditions of discipline, patriotism, religious observance and scholastic achievement; that and his forthright manner won the boys' respect and that of their parents.

Girdlestone was appointed honorary canon of St Peter's Cathedral in 1912 by Bishop Thomas. He and his wife, with Archdeacon Hornabrook, put much effort and energy into the founding and running of St. Peter's College Mission, a charitable outreach at St. Mary Magdalene's Church, Moore Street off Angas Street. He was a member of the University of Adelaide council from 1901 and for most of his time in Adelaide actively involved with the Adelaide Rowing Club and its president 1913–15.

He resigned as headmaster in 1916, saying that the job should be that of a younger man (large of frame, he had continually to fight a tendency to overweight), and retired to his home in Balhannah, T. Ainslie Caterer filling the vacancy. He consented however, to take charge in 1917 of Melbourne Grammar School, whose headmaster, Richard Penrose "Lofty" Franklin (November 1884 – 12 October 1942) had volunteered for war service, and relinquished the position on the return of Lieut. Franklin in 1919.

He retired with his family to England in April 1920 by the liner SS Osterley, and lived at "Hillcote" Lansdown, near Bath, where he died, and was buried at Lansdown cemetery.

== Family ==
Girdlestone married Helen Joanna Crawford (died November 1946) on 17 September 1900. Helen was a daughter of W. Crawford, Adelaide manager of the Union Bank. They had two children:

- Peter Crawford Girdlestone (1902– )
- (Helen) Neste Girdlestone, later Mrs Donald Murray (1905– )
