= Filamin-B =

Protein-coding gene in the species Homo sapiens

FLNB
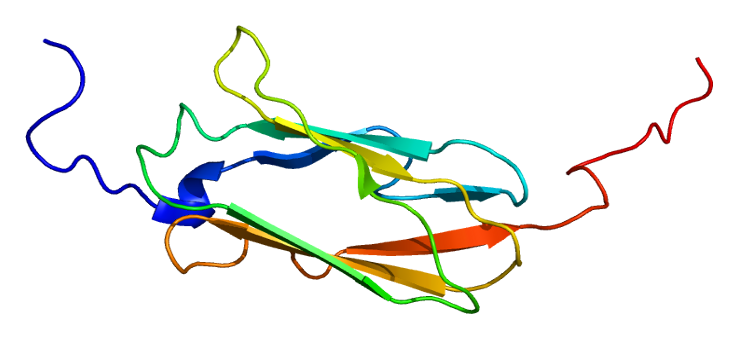

Identifiers
- Aliases: FLNB, ABP-278, ABP-280, AOI, FH1, FLN-B, FLN1L, LRS1, SCT, TABP, TAP, filamin B
- External IDs: OMIM: 603381; MGI: 2446089; GeneCards: FLNB
Available structures
| PDB | Ortholog search: PDBe RCSB |
| PDB | List of PDB id codes 2DI8, 2DI9, 2DIA, 2DIB, 2DIC, 2DJ4, 2DLG, 2DMB, 2DMC, 2E9I, 2E9J, 2EE6, 2EE9, 2EEA, 2EEB, 2EEC, 2EED, 2WA5, 2WA6, 2WA7, 3FER, 4B7L |

Gene location (Human)
| Chr. | Chromosome 3 (human) |
| Band | 3p14.3 | Start | 58,008,398 bp |
| Band | 3p14.3 | End | 58,172,251 bp |

Gene location (Mouse)
| Chr. | Chromosome 14 (mouse) |
| Band | 14|14 A1 | Start | 14,518,185 bp |
| Band | 14|14 A1 | End | 14,651,816 bp |
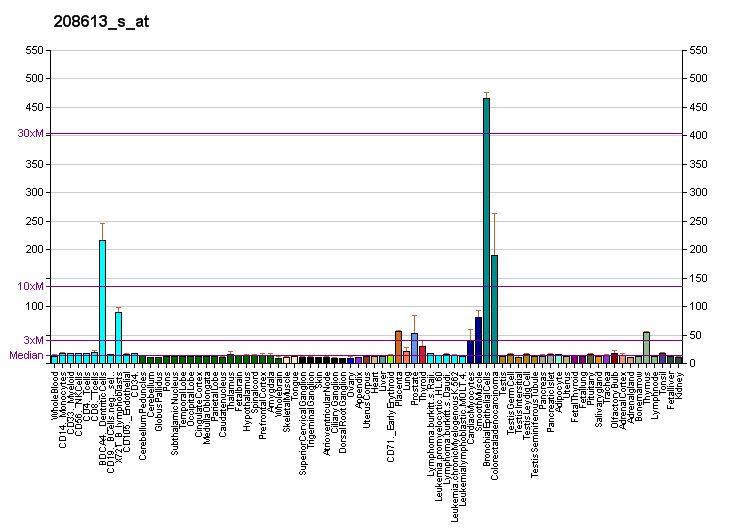

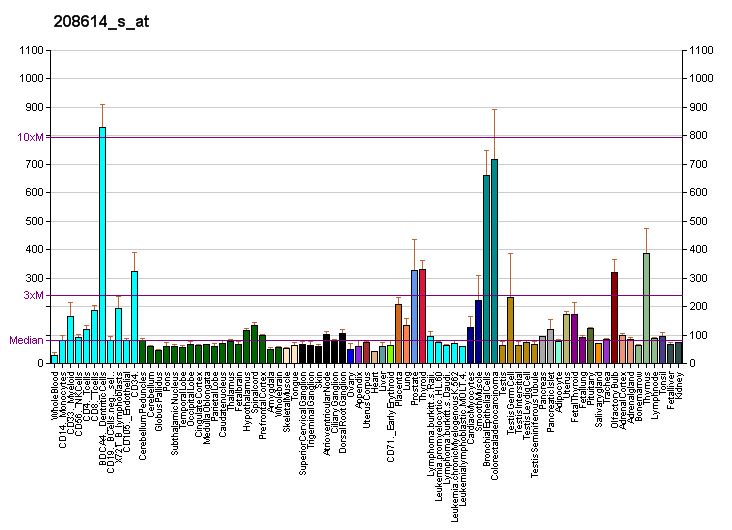
RNA expression pattern
| Bgee | Human / Mouse (ortholog); Top expressed in: mucosa of transverse colon; tibial nerve; body of uterus; right uterine tube; sural nerve; prostate; muscle layer of sigmoid colon; mucosa of ileum; left lobe of thyroid gland; left uterine tube / Top expressed in: epithelium of stomach; phalanx of foot; left colon; mucous cell of stomach; pyloric antrum; secondary oocyte; corneal stroma; lip; submandibular gland; uterus; More reference expression data |
| BioGPS | More reference expression data |
Gene ontology
| Molecular function | identical protein binding; protein binding; actin binding; RNA binding; cadherin binding |
| Cellular component | integral component of membrane; cytoskeleton; brush border; actin cytoskeleton; extracellular exosome; stress fiber; plasma membrane; Z discdkac; cytoplasm; cell cortex; focal adhesion; extracellular matrix; cytosol; nucleus; neuron projection; soma; phagocytic vesicle |
| Biological process | muscle organ development; skeletal muscle tissue development; actin cytoskeleton organization; epithelial cell morphogenesis; multicellular organism development; cell differentiation; signal transduction; keratinocyte development; cellular response to interferon-gamma |
Sources:Amigo / QuickGO
Orthologs
| Databases | NCBI: entry; OMA: entry |
| Species | Human | Mouse |
| Entrez | 2317 | 286940 |
| Ensembl | ENSG00000136068 | ENSMUSG00000025278 |
| UniProt | O75369 | Q80X90 |
| RefSeq (mRNA) | NM_001164317; NM_001164318; NM_001164319; NM_001457 | NM_001081427; NM_134080 |
| RefSeq (protein) | NP_001157789; NP_001157790; NP_001157791; NP_001448 | NP_001074896; NP_598841 |
| Location (UCSC) | Chr 3: 58.01 – 58.17 Mb | Chr 14: 14.52 – 14.65 Mb |
| PubMed search |
- Wikidata
| View/Edit Human | View/Edit Mouse |

Filamin B, beta (FLNB), also known as Filamin B, beta (truncated actin binding protein 278 homolog), is a cytoplasmic protein which in humans is encoded by the FLNB gene.

FLNB regulates intracellular communication and signalling by cross-linking the protein actin to allow direct communication between the cell membrane and cytoskeletal network, to control and guide proper skeletal development.

Mutations in the FLNB gene are involved in several lethal bone dysplasias, including boomerang dysplasia and atelosteogenesis type I.

== Interactions ==
FLNB has been shown to interact with GP1BA, Filamin-A, FBLIM1, PSEN1, CD29 and PSEN2.

== See also ==
- Larsen syndrome
