= Filamin =

Class of proteins

Filamins are a class of proteins that hold two actin filaments at large angles. Filamin protein in mammals is made up of an actin-binding domain at its N-terminus that is followed by 24 immunoglobulin-like repeat modules of roughly 95 amino acids. There are two hinge regions; between repeats 15-16 and 23-24. Filamin gets cleaved at these hinge regions to generate smaller fragments of the protein. Filamin has two actin-binding sites with a V-linkage between them, so that it cross-links actin filaments into a network with the filaments oriented almost at right angles to one another.

Filamin proteins include:

- Filamin-A
- Filamin-B
- Filamin-C

Over-expression of FLNA stops the regeneration of bladder carcinoma (BC) cells, by inhibiting the cell cycle and inducing apoptosis of BC cells. FLNA has also been shown to reduce the mobility and invasion abilities of BC cells.

== FLNA ==
The FLNa protein is also known for having an important structural function in the cardiovascular system. In particular, it has been studied by the American Society of Hematology for its role in platelet function in the blood. Platelets are known for their role in wound repair as they are able to aggregate and stop bleeding. Megakaryocytes allow for the production of platelets. However, mutations in the FLNa gene have been found to disrupt the process of healing as they limit the production of giant platelets that are needed for healing. This condition is known as Macrothrombocytopenia.

== FLNC ==
The FLNC protein is important to the functioning of cardiac and skeletal tissue. In particular, mutations to the FLNC can have detrimental effects on cardiac tissue. The FLNC proteins have an important role in the structure of cardiac muscle. They contribute to the z-disk proteins which are heavily found in both cardiac and skeletal muscle tissue. Many studies have been conducted to evaluate the effects of mutations on the FLNC gene to patients that are otherwise healthy in terms of their heart. Studies conducted by the American College of Cardiology Foundation show that missense mutations in the FLNC gene could be precursors for diverse cardiomyopathies. Specifically, hypertrophic cardiomyopathy (HCM) and restrictive cardiomyopathy (RCM) were noted. A further investigation of the link between this protein and cardiac tissue could allow professionals to develop treatments to prevent and treat patients with FLNC mutation induced cardiomyopathies.
