= St Peter's College, Adelaide =

Independent Anglican boys' school in Adelaide, Australia

St Peter's College
- Latin: Sancti Petri Schola Collegiata

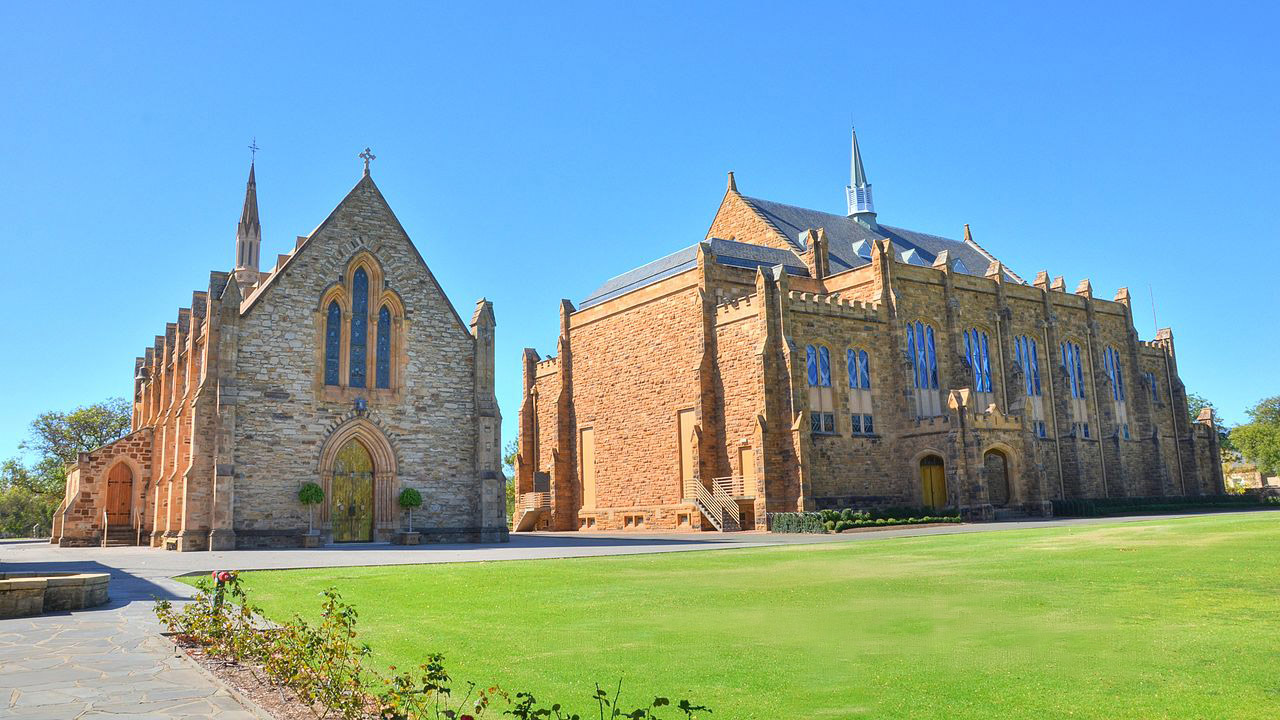

Location
- Hackney, Adelaide, South Australia; Australia; 34°54′49″S 138°37′4″E

Information
- Other name: The Collegiate School of St Peter
- Type: Independent day and boarding school
- Motto: Latin: Pro Deo et Patria (For God and Country)
- Denomination: Anglican
- Established: 15 July 1847; 179 years ago
- Headmaster: Tim Browning
- Chaplain: Theo McCall
- Years: ELC–Year 12
- Gender: Boys
- Enrolment: 1,585 (2025)
- Campus: Hackney Road; Finniss
- Area: 32 ha (79 acres) (main campus)
- Colours: Royal blue and white
- School fees: A$34,760 (2026, Year 12 total annual charges)
- Affiliations: Association of Independent Schools of South Australia; HMC; Sports Association for Adelaide Schools
- Website: stpeters.sa.edu.au

St Peter's College (legally The Anglican Church of Australia Collegiate School of Saint Peter) is an independent Anglican day and boarding school for boys in Adelaide, South Australia. It was founded in 1847 as the Church of England Collegiate School of South Australia, opening on 15 July in a schoolroom behind Holy Trinity Church on North Terrace. Classes moved to the present Hackney Road site in 1850.

The school teaches boys from Early Years to Year 12. Senior students may take the South Australian Certificate of Education (SACE) or the International Baccalaureate Diploma Programme; St Peter's has been an authorised IB school since 1997. The main campus is at Hackney, and the school also has the Norm Howard Outdoor Education Centre at Finniss, near Lake Alexandrina.

The Big Quad precinct is listed on the South Australian Heritage Register. Former pupils include Nobel laureates Lawrence Bragg, Howard Florey and Robin Warren.

== History ==
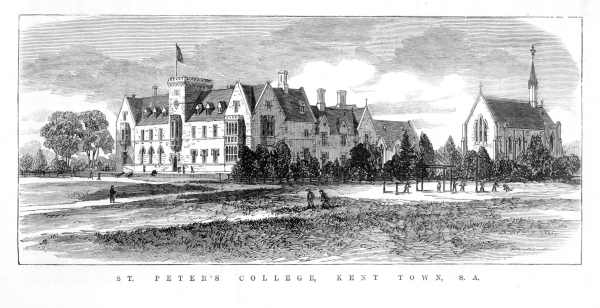
The St Peter's College grounds in 1875. Old School House is centre-ground and the chapel is to the right.

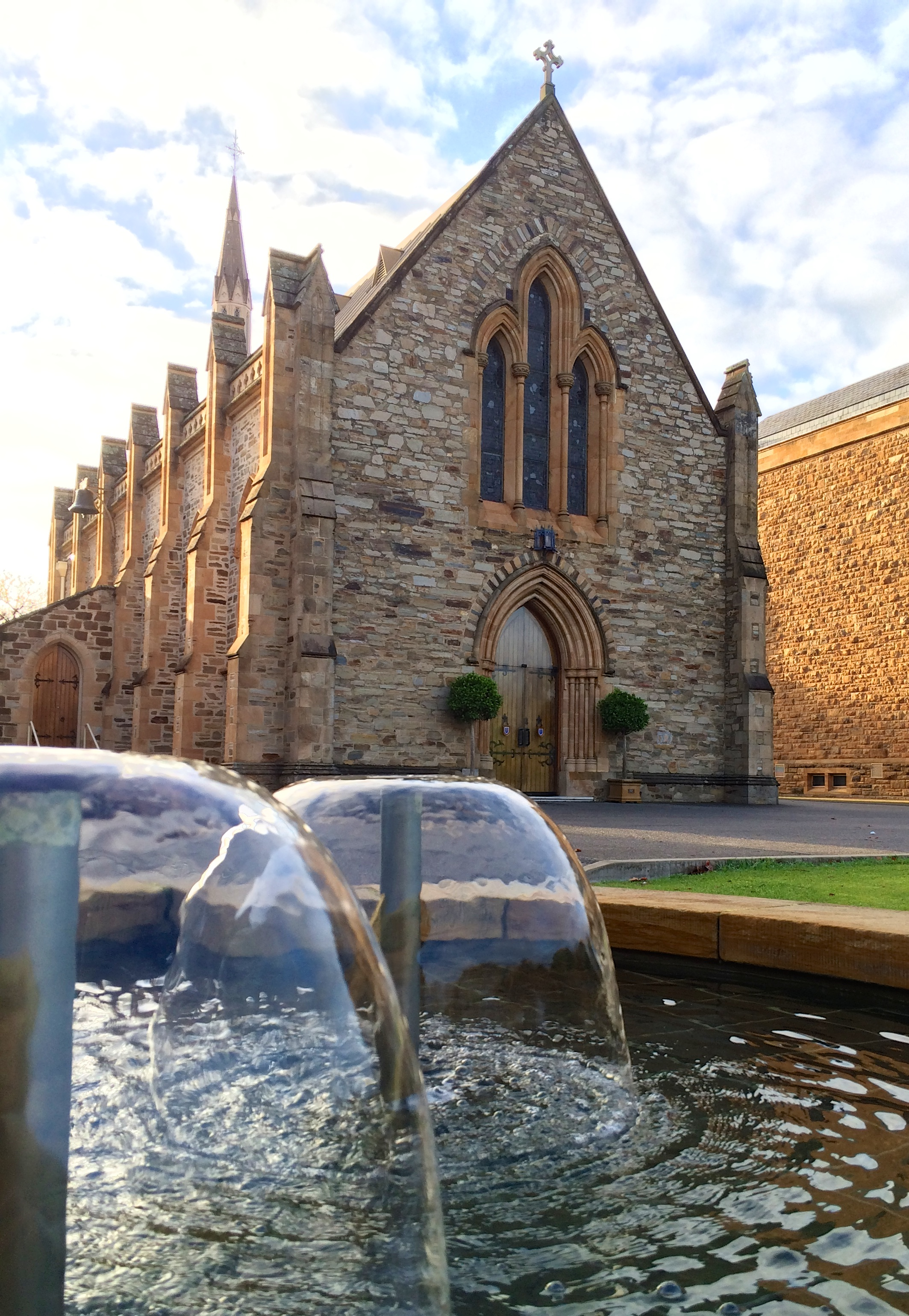
The St Peter's College chapel, opened in 1864

=== Foundation and early years, 1847–1878 ===
On 24 February 1847, a group of colonists met at Holy Trinity Church to discuss establishing a proprietary school for boys. William James Woodcock and Marshall MacDermott were among the principal organisers; others involved included James Farrell, William Allen, William Wyatt and George Wright Hawkes. A deed of settlement was drawn up in March, and the proposed South Australia Proprietary School was renamed the Church of England Collegiate School of South Australia in May. The school opened on 15 July 1847 with 11 pupils and one teacher.

Augustus Short, the first Anglican Bishop of Adelaide, arrived in December 1847 with a £2,000 grant from the Society for Promoting Christian Knowledge. His chaplain, Theodore Wilson, became headmaster in January 1848. Short bought land at Hackney in January 1848. On 24 May 1849 he laid the foundation stone of the main building in the presence of Governor Sir Henry Edward Fox Young. The school was incorporated under the Saint Peter's Collegiate School Ordinance Act 1849. An amending Act in 1889 changed the formal name to the Church of England Collegiate School of St Peter.

Because the Trinity schoolroom was overcrowded, a separate schoolroom at Hackney was finished before the main building. Designed by Henry Stuckey, Big School Room opened on 23 January 1850 and classes moved there from North Terrace. Informal boarding had begun in 1848, when Wilson accommodated pupils at his city residence. Formal boarding at Hackney dates from 1853, when boarders moved into the Main Building, later called Old School House.

Wilson resigned in 1851. Samuel Allom and Edmund Jenkins were acting heads before George Henry Farr arrived in 1854. Farr remained headmaster until 1878. The chapel nave opened in 1864, and Old School House was extended in 1870.

=== Expansion, 1879–1919 ===
Farr was followed by William Stanford, Francis Williams and Philip Raynor. Their terms ran from 1879 to 1881, 1882 to 1889 and 1890 to 1893 respectively. The first St Peter's School Magazine appeared in June 1884. The motto Pro Deo et Patria ("For God and Country") was adopted in 1890, and a cadet corps was established in 1900.

Henry Girdlestone was headmaster from 1894 to 1915. Enrolment rose from about 170 to 475 during his term. He co-founded a school mission at St Mary Magdalene's Church in 1908, and a separate Preparatory School opened in 1910. T. Ainslie Caterer was acting headmaster from 1916 to 1919. Memorial Hall and the Big Quad cloisters were later built as war memorials.

=== Interwar and wartime years, 1920–1945 ===
Julian Bickersteth became headmaster in 1920. He made games compulsory and introduced a house system. The first four houses later became Da Costa, Farrell, Hawkes and Short.

Memorial Hall was built in memory of members of the school community who served in the First World War. Governor Sir Archibald Weigall laid the foundation stone in 1921, and the hall opened on 22 September 1929.

Guy Pentreath, headmaster from 1934 to 1943, added or expanded music, art, woodwork and engineering in the curriculum. A building program in 1935–36 produced a new headmaster's residence, a new boarding house, changing rooms and alterations around the Big Quad. The 1878 gymnasium became Da Costa Dining Hall, and Big School Room became the school library. MacDermott and Woodcock houses were added in 1937.

During the Second World War the engineering workshop made munitions components and an Air Training Corps was added to the cadet corps. Pentreath returned to England in 1943; John Holroyd Hill was acting headmaster in 1944–45.

=== Post-war years, 1946–1978 ===
Colin Gordon became headmaster in 1946 and was the first layman to hold the post. The school then had about 700 pupils. Gordon recruited new staff, appointed a full-time psychologist for educational guidance and changed the senior curriculum and assessment system.

The college bought Athelney House in 1952; it later became part of a boarding complex. The Cedric Hayward Memorial Gates were dedicated in 1953. The Memorial Arch and western and southern cloisters in the Big Quad followed in 1957.

The Rev. John Stephen Corfield Miller succeeded Gordon in 1961. During Miller's term the Senior School grew by about one fifth and 21 major building projects were completed. Curriculum changes included agricultural courses and Indonesian, and arts and classical studies received greater attention. Howard and Young houses were created in 1963.

New School House ceased to be a boarding house in 1971 and was renamed the Pentreath Building in 1976. The Miller Library opened in 1977, ending Big School Room's use as the main library.

=== Since 1978 ===
The St Peter's College Foundation was established in 1985 during Tony Shinkfield's headmastership. On 2 December that year a fire badly damaged Memorial Hall. The exterior walls survived, and the rebuilt hall was opened by South Australian Governor Sir Donald Dunstan on 11 March 1988.

St Peter's became an authorised International Baccalaureate school in 1997. School House at Athelney closed as a boarding residence in 2002, and School & Allen House began operating the following year after the enlargement of Wyatt & Allen House. The Burchnall Sports Centre opened in 2003.

A whole-school positive-education program developed during Simon Murray's headmastership. Psychologist Martin Seligman worked at the school in 2012. The program was discussed in a 2012 case study and a 2015 edited volume on positive education.

The Junior School was redeveloped in 2010. The Pentreath Building was converted for Years 7 and 8 and opened in that role in 2016. The Big Quad precinct was entered on the South Australian Heritage Register in 2016. Tim Browning became the school's 15th headmaster in 2018. The Big Quad and Big School Room were redeveloped in 2021–22. The new Year 12 College and other rooms around the quadrangle were formally opened on 29 July 2022, during the school's 175th-anniversary Founders' Day observance.

=== Benefactions and endowments ===
Early benefactors included William Allen and James Farrell. Allen gave about £7,000 and land to the school. Farrell left the residue of his estate, valued at £15,700, to the college.

Benjamin Mendes da Costa left his South Australian real estate to the school, subject to life interests held by ten relatives. The last beneficiary died in 1910 and the property passed to the school in 1912. A house, the dining hall and a scholarship bear his name.

Scholarships are documented at St Peter's from at least 1869. The St Peter's College Foundation, founded in 1985, raises money for scholarships and building projects. The 175-Year Anniversary Scholarship was established after the school's first Giving Day in 2021.

== Governance and Anglican identity ==
St Peter's is governed by a Council of Governors under the school's Act and statutes. The Archbishop of Adelaide is an ex officio governor and president of the Council. The Saint Peter's Collegiate School Ordinance Act 1849 remains an Act of limited application in South Australia.

The school is Anglican and admits students of other faiths or none. Its stated values are Truth, Respect and Service. Senior School students attend chapel and study Theology and Philosophy, which covers Christianity, other religions and Western philosophy. The School Chaplain is the Rev. Dr Theo McCall.

== Headmasters ==
The school numbers its substantive headmasters and does not include acting appointments in that sequence.

Headmasters of St Peter's College, Adelaide
Ordinal	Officeholder	Term
1	Rev. Theodore Wilson	1848–1850
2	Rev. George Farr	1854–1878
3	Rev. William Stanford	1879–1881
4	Rev. Francis Williams	1882–1889
5	Rev. Philip Edwin Raynor	1890–1893
6	Rev. Henry Girdlestone	1894–1915
7	Rev. Julian Bickersteth	1920–1933
8	Rev. Guy Pentreath	1934–1943
9	Colin Gordon	1946–1960
10	Rev. John Miller	1961–1978
11	Dr Tony Shinkfield	1978–1992
12	Richard Burchnall	1992–2004
13	Philip Grutzner	2005–2010
14	Simon Murray	2010–2017
15	Tim Browning	2018–present

Acting headmasters have included Samuel Allom (1851–1853), Edmund Jenkins (1853–1854), T. Ainslie Caterer (1916–1919), John Holroyd Hill (1944–1945), R. E. Cameron, F. H. Schubert and Ben Hanisch. Cameron acted in 1945 and 1952, and Schubert acted as headmaster on six occasions. Hanisch was acting headmaster in the second half of 2017.

== Emblem and motto ==
Collectable Australian school cigarette card featuring an earlier St Peter's College crest, c. 1920s.

Engraver Samuel Calvert designed the school's first emblem in 1849. Based on the emblem of the Society for Promoting Christian Knowledge, it showed a robed female figure representing wisdom, with a crucifix and a light. The design carried the school's Latin name and the date 1849.

The Council of Governors adopted a new crest and the motto Pro Deo et Patria ("For God and Country") in 1890. The present crest has a blue shield with crossed gold keys and a bishop's mitre. The keys refer to Saint Peter and the mitre to the school's Anglican connection.

== Campus and heritage ==
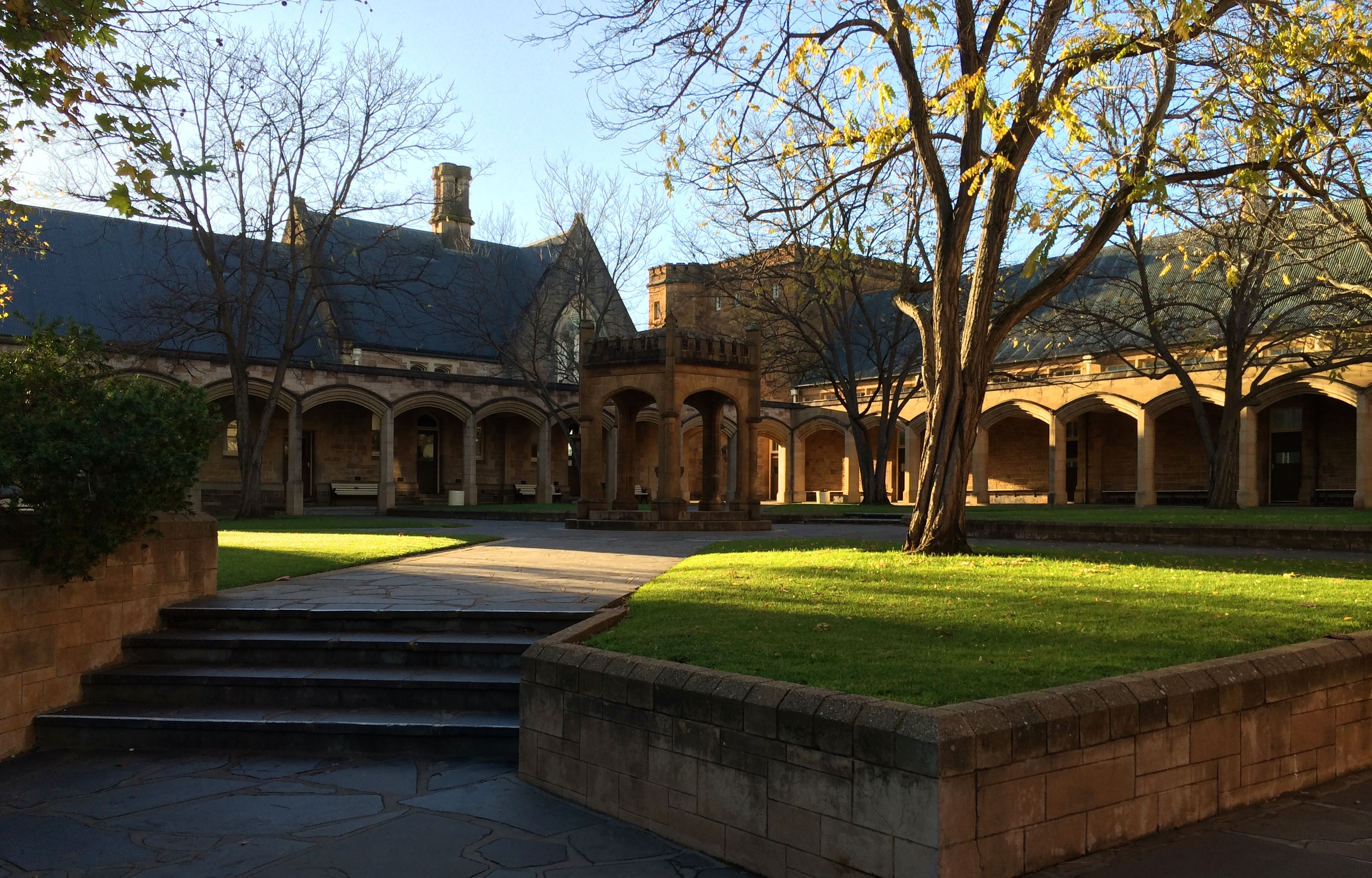
The Big Quadrangle before its 2022 redevelopment

The main campus occupies about 32 ha (79 acres) on Hackney Road, about 2 kilometres (1.2 mi) from the Adelaide city centre. A government heritage survey records that neighbouring land was laid out as "College Town" in 1849; the later suburb names College Park and St Peters continued the association with the school.

Early Years and Junior School facilities are at the southern end of the campus. Years 7 and 8 are based in the Pentreath Building, and Years 9–12 use the Senior School precinct. The grounds have seven ovals, a hockey pitch, ten tennis courts, swimming pools, gymnasiums and specialist teaching and performing-arts facilities.

=== Heritage precinct ===
The Big Quad precinct was entered on the South Australian Heritage Register on 7 December 2016 (State Heritage ID 26457). The registered place includes Old School House, Big School Room, the chapel, Memorial Hall, Da Costa Dining Hall, cloisters and the Jury Memorial Fountain.

Big School Room opened in 1850 and was the first completed building at Hackney. It was the Stow Memorial Library from 1938 until the Miller Library opened in 1977, and it has also been used for classes, examinations, debates and school gatherings. The school claims that it is the oldest classroom still in use in Australia. Old School House developed from the Main Building begun in 1849. By 1857 it housed staff and boarders; extensions followed in 1870 and 1897.

The present chapel was designed by Edward Hamilton. Its foundation stone was laid in 1861 and the nave opened in 1864. The chancel and roof flèche were completed in 1873, with an organ chamber added in 1877 and a vestry in 1878. Major renovations took place in 1912 and 1987.

The quadrangle took shape over several decades. A gymnasium built in 1878 formed the northern side, and classrooms were added on the other sides. The Jury Memorial Fountain dates from 1919. In the 1930s the gymnasium was converted into Da Costa Dining Hall. Memorial Hall opened in 1929, was badly damaged by fire in 1985 and reopened in 1988. The Memorial Arch and western and southern cloisters date from 1957; an eastern cloister was added in 1986.

=== Other buildings ===
Athelney House is an Italianate residence built in 1858 for Peter Dowding Prankerd. St Peter's bought it in 1952, and it formed part of the boarding accommodation from the 1960s until 2002.

The Pentreath Building was built in 1935–36 as a boarding house. Boarding ended there in 1971, and the building was named after Guy Pentreath in 1976. It was redeveloped for Years 7 and 8 in 2015–16.

The separate Preparatory School opened in 1910. Its original building was later named the Shinkfield Building and was modernised in the mid-1980s. Old Palm House, now used by the Early Learning Centre, was entered on the South Australian Heritage Register in 1990.

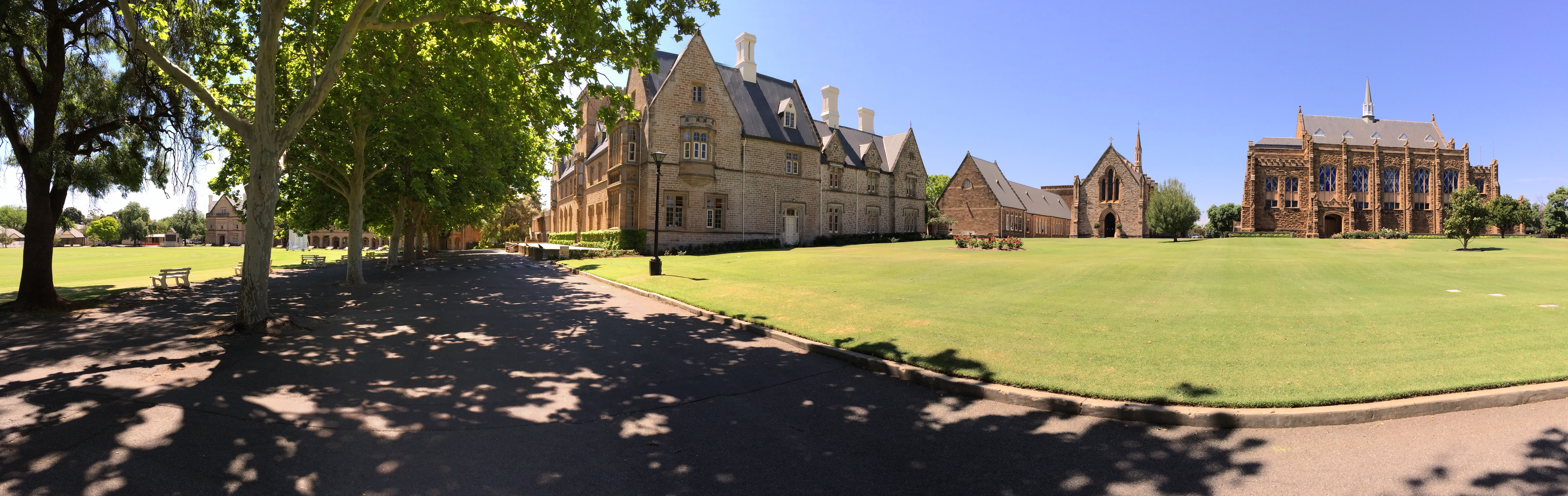
Panorama of St Peter's College buildings, including Old School House, the Chapel and Memorial Hall

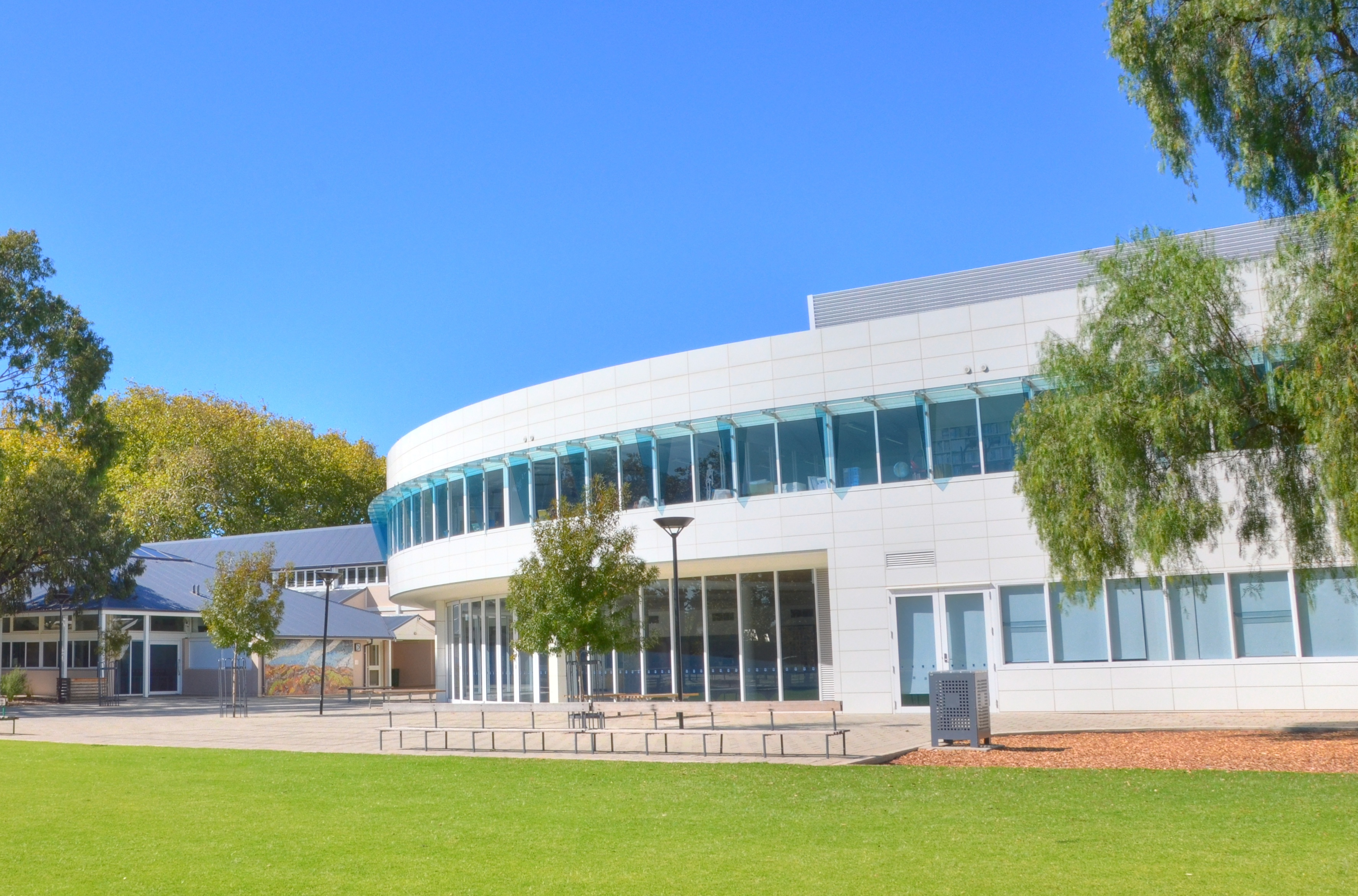
Junior School campus

=== Finniss ===
The Norm Howard Outdoor Education Centre is at Finniss, near Lake Alexandrina. It is used for school camps, rowing and other outdoor-education activities. The school's outdoor-education program begins in the Junior Years and includes a 21-day Year 10 journey through the Flinders Ranges.

== School organisation and curriculum ==
St Peter's is divided into Early Years, Junior Years, Middle Years and Senior Years. My School recorded 1,585 students in 2025. The Early Learning Centre is for boys aged three and four. The Junior Years cover Prep, Reception and Years 1–6; Middle Years are Years 7 and 8, and Senior Years are Years 9–12.

=== Curriculum ===
The Senior School has nine faculties covering arts, English, health and physical education, humanities, languages, mathematics, science, technology, and theology and philosophy. Years 7 and 8 follow a common program and study a language. Year 9 students have a larger elective program, and in Year 10 science separates into biology, physics and chemistry.

Some students take subjects above their nominal year level under the school's "stage not age" arrangements. The school has more than 25 SACE subjects and also offers the IB Diploma Programme. Selected senior students can undertake university subjects before completing Year 12 through the University Studies Program.

=== Pastoral care ===
All Senior School students belong to a house. Years 7 and 8 have year-level mentor classes; from Year 9 students move to vertical House mentor groups. Mentors, Heads of House, chaplains, year-level staff and school psychologists are involved in pastoral care.

== Boarding ==
The first pupils to board with the school lived with headmaster Theodore Wilson in 1848. Other off-campus arrangements followed. The school dates formal boarding at Hackney from 1853, when boarders moved into the Main Building, later Old School House.

Boarders have occupied several buildings. Old School House was used until the new School House opened in 1936; that building, now Pentreath, ceased boarding use in 1971. Wyatt House and Allen House were combined as Wyatt & Allen House, while Athelney House was used for boarding from the 1960s until 2002.

School & Allen House was formed in 2003. The 2026 Senior School handbook gives the boarding population as up to 100 boys in Years 7–12. Boys in Years 11 and 12 have private rooms, and boarders eat in Da Costa Dining Hall.

== House system ==
The Senior School house system dates from 1920. There are ten houses, used for pastoral care and inter-house competition.

Senior School houses
House	Founded	Colour	Emblem	Namesake or origin
Da Costa	1920	Grey	Kangaroo	Benjamin Mendes da Costa, benefactor
Farrell	1920	Purple	Emu	James Farrell, first Dean of Adelaide and benefactor
Hawkes	1920	Gold/yellow	Griffin	George Wright Hawkes, early promoter, governor and benefactor
Short	1920	Brown	Lion	Augustus Short, first Anglican Bishop of Adelaide
MacDermott	1937	Emerald green	Heraldic boars and chevron	Marshall MacDermott, founder and early governor
Woodcock	1937	Cerise and black	Caduceus	William James Woodcock, Anglican clergyman and founder
Howard	1963	Navy blue	Southern Cross	Charles Beaumont Howard, first Colonial Chaplain of South Australia
Young	1963	Red and blue	Kookaburra	Sir Henry Edward Fox Young, Governor of South Australia and benefactor
Farr	1987	Burgundy	Eagle	George Henry Farr, second substantive headmaster
School & Allen	2003	Light blue and white	Phoenix	Formed from School House and Wyatt & Allen House; Allen commemorates William Allen

The Junior School has four houses: Alliston-Jones, Brooks, Clayton-Dyer and Stokes-Ware. They are named after former Preparatory School teachers and heads.

== Co-curricular activities ==
=== Sport ===
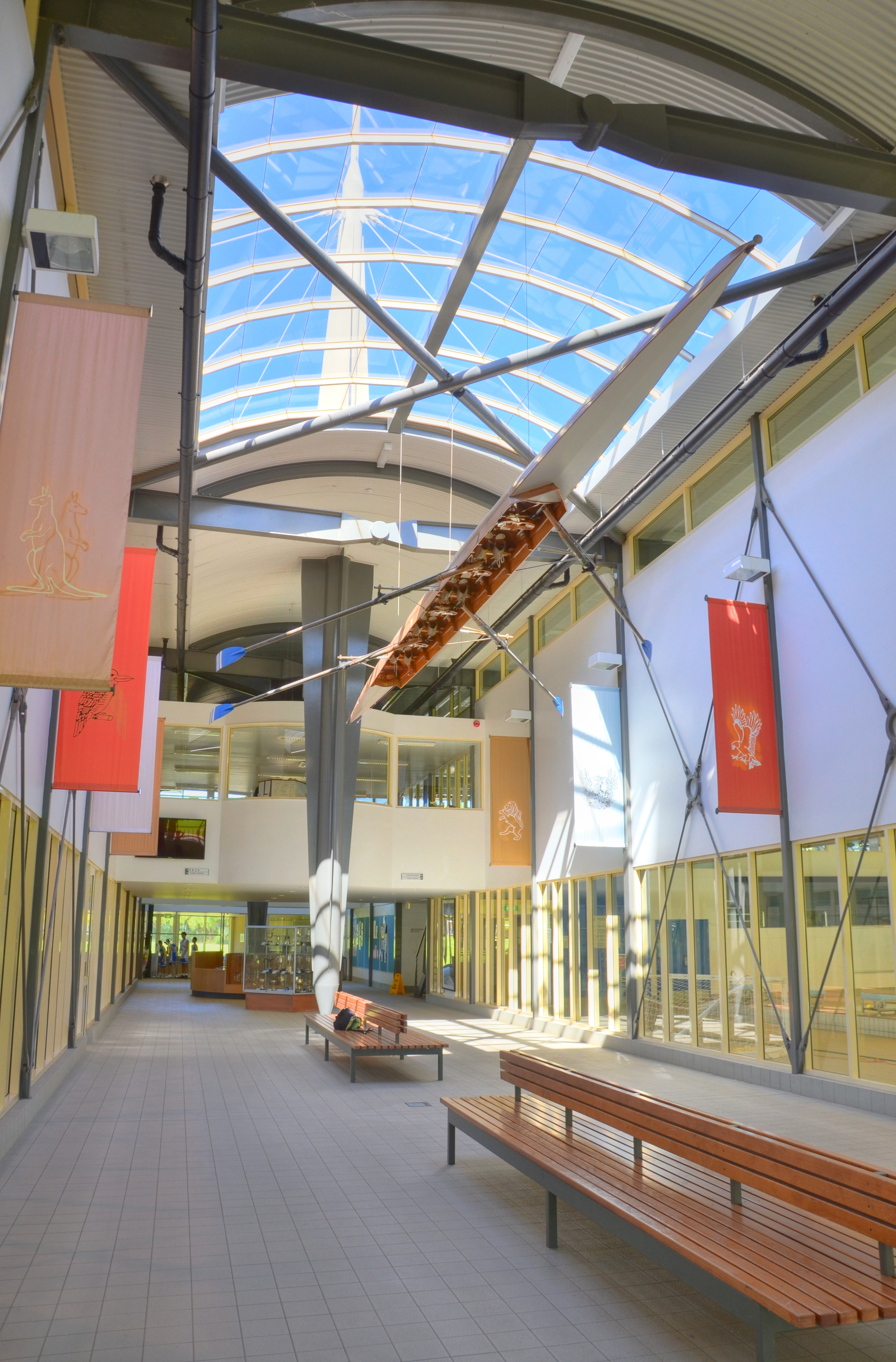
Entrance hall of the Burchnall Sports Centre

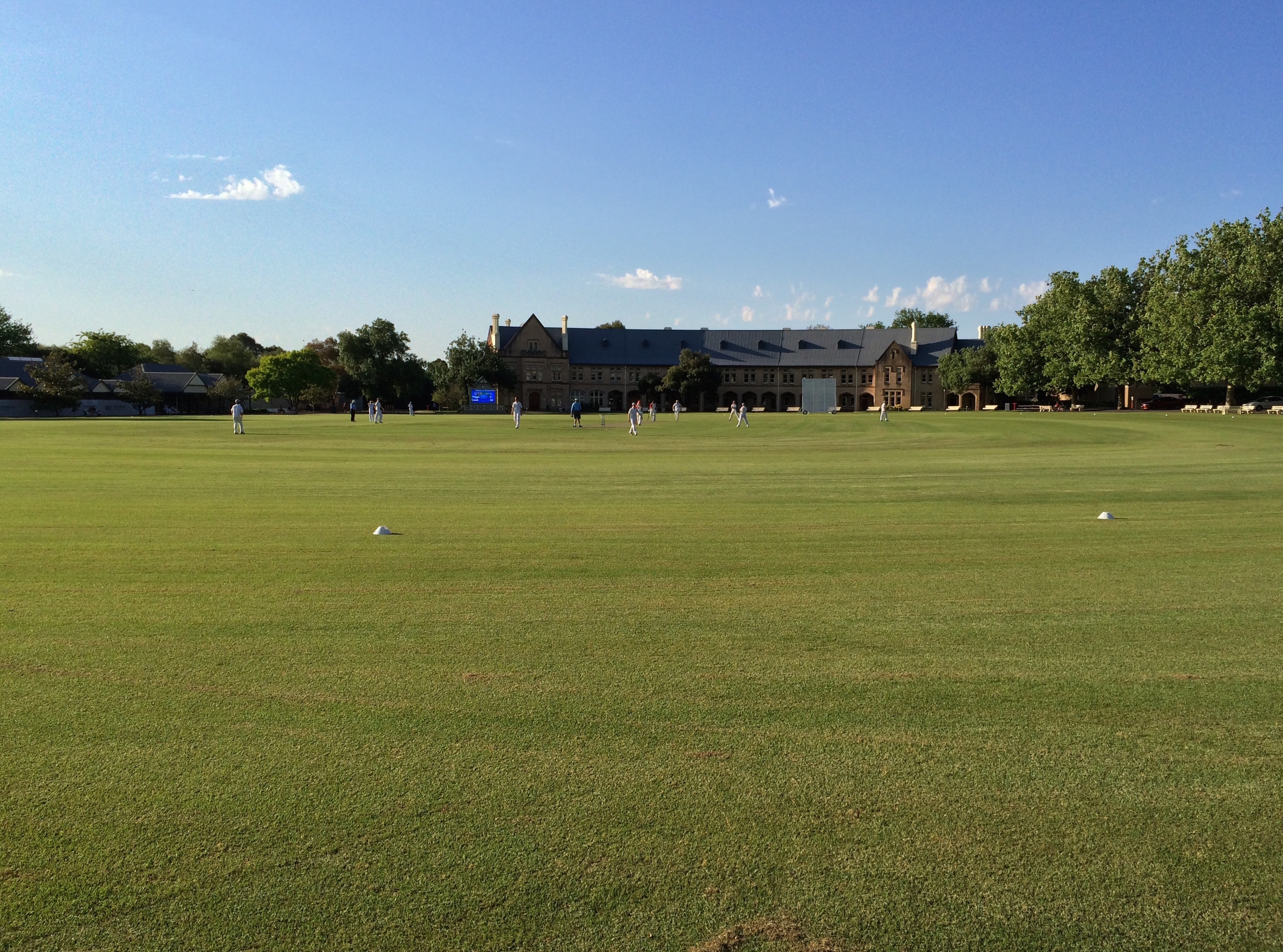
Cricket on the Main Oval

Sport is compulsory in the Senior School, although the requirement varies by year level. St Peter's competes in the Sports Association for Adelaide Schools (SAAS).

The main inter-school rivalry is with Prince Alfred College. Intercol competitions are held in a number of sports. The cricket match has been played annually since 1878; Katharine Thornton's history of the school describes it as the world's longest continuously played annual school cricket fixture.

=== Music and drama ===
Music is compulsory to Year 8 and is an elective from Year 9. The 2026 Senior School handbook reported more than 30 ensembles and choirs and about 350 students taking private music lessons. The program includes orchestras, bands and choirs.

Drama is part of the curriculum and co-curricular program. Senior School activities include a senior play or musical, a Years 7–9 production and technical theatre.

=== Clubs and societies ===
The 2026 handbook lists clubs and societies in areas including art, languages, history, mathematics, science, public speaking, mooting, service and reconciliation. Cross Keys is an annual publication of student art and writing.

=== Outdoor education ===
Outdoor education is compulsory in Years 7–10. Year 7 includes an overnight stay at Finniss and a five-day expedition; Year 8 has a five-day program on the Yorke Peninsula; and Year 9 travels to Gariwerd (Grampians National Park). Year 10 students undertake a 21-day journey in the Flinders Ranges.

=== Service learning ===
Service programs in the Senior School include Buddy Up, the Sony Foundation Children's Holiday Camp with Wilderness School, The Smith Family Student2Student reading program and Mary Mags Dinners. Students may also arrange individual service placements.

== Indigenous education and reconciliation ==
The school acknowledges the Kaurna people as the traditional owners of the Adelaide Plains. Its 2023–2027 strategic framework includes partnerships supporting First Nations education. Senior School activities have included a Reconciliation Committee, National Reconciliation Week events and inter-school Anglican workshops. The school has also offered the Adbri Scholarship for Indigenous Students.

== Traditions and commemorations ==
Founders' Day marks the opening of the school on 15 July 1847. By the late nineteenth century old scholars held a church service on the Sunday nearest 15 July. It became a whole-school observance during Guy Pentreath's headmastership in the 1930s.

Speech Day developed from the school's first prize-giving at Holy Trinity Church in 1848. After the move to Hackney it was held in Big School Room, and from 1929 in Memorial Hall.

Guy Pentreath introduced the School Prayer. The phrase "the message of its walls and fields" from the prayer was later used in the title of Katharine Thornton's 2010 history of the school. An Anzac memorial service is held in front of Memorial Hall.

== Old scholars and community ==
St Peter's Old Collegians was formed in 1870 and incorporated in 1871; the first recorded Old Scholars' Dinner was held in 1864. The association organises reunions and other alumni activities and reports more than 11,000 members.

The Mission Guild was established in 1923 and raises money for charities and student service activities. The St Peter's College Foundation, established in 1985, raises money for scholarships and capital works.

== Publications and archives ==
The St Peter's College Magazine began in June 1884. Saints, a community publication, was first issued in 1974. The school archives hold records, photographs and objects relating to the school's history.

== Notable alumni ==
According to the school, its former pupils include three Nobel laureates, ten Australian premiers and 42 Rhodes Scholars. Selected alumni include:

- Lawrence Bragg – physicist and co-recipient of the 1915 Nobel Prize in Physics.
- Don Dunstan – Premier of South Australia from 1967 to 1968 and 1970 to 1979.
- Howard Florey – pharmacologist and co-recipient of the 1945 Nobel Prize in Physiology or Medicine for work on penicillin.
- Bruce Frayne – sprinter and member of Australia's fourth-placed men's 4 × 400 metres relay team at the 1984 Summer Olympics.
- Richard Harris – anaesthetist and joint recipient of the 2019 Australian of the Year award.
- Scott Hicks – film director known for Shine (1996).
- Essington Lewis – industrialist and Australia's director-general of munitions during the Second World War.
- Aidan Murphy – sprinter and bronze medallist in the men's 4 × 400 m relay at the 2026 World Athletics Relays.
- Lachie Neale – Australian rules footballer and winner of the 2020 and 2023 Brownlow Medals.
- Andy Thomas – aerospace engineer and NASA astronaut.
- Robin Warren – pathologist and co-recipient of the 2005 Nobel Prize in Physiology or Medicine for research on Helicobacter pylori.

== See also ==
- List of schools in South Australia
- List of Anglican schools in Australia
- List of boarding schools in Australia
