= Sorbs (disambiguation) =

Sorbs (also known as Lusatians or Wends), are a west Slavic people living in Lusatia.

Sorbs may also refer to:

- Sorbs (tribe), a 7th- to 10th-century Early Slavic tribe in Lower Lusatia
- Sorbs, Hérault, a commune in the Hérault département in France
- SORBS, the Spam and Open Relay Blocking System, an open proxy and open mail relay Domain Name System Black List
- SORBS1, a human gene
- SORBS2, a human gene
- SORBS3, a human gene

== See also ==
- Sorb (disambiguation)
