= CBLB =

CBLB may refer to:

- CBLB (gene)
- CBLB (AM), a radio retransmitter (1340 AM) licensed to serve Schreiber, Ontario, Canada
