= Cbl TKB domain =

CBL proto-oncogene N-terminal domain 1 (four-helix bundle)
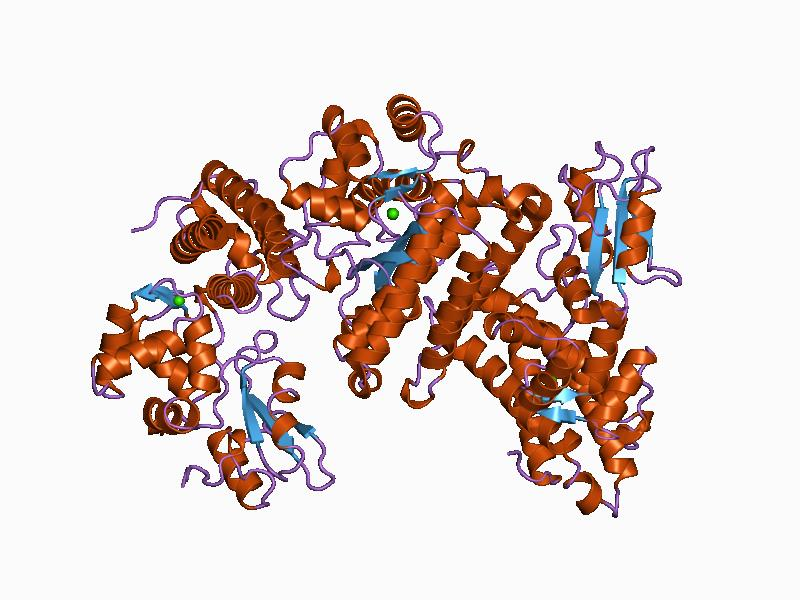
- structure of the n-terminal domain of cbl in complex with its binding site in zap-70

Identifiers
- Symbol: Cbl_N
- Pfam: PF02262
- InterPro: IPR003153
- SCOP2: 1b47 / SCOPe / SUPFAM
Available protein structures:
- Pfam: structures / ECOD
- PDB: RCSB PDB; PDBe; PDBj
- PDBsum: structure summary

CBL proto-oncogene N-terminus, EF hand-like domain
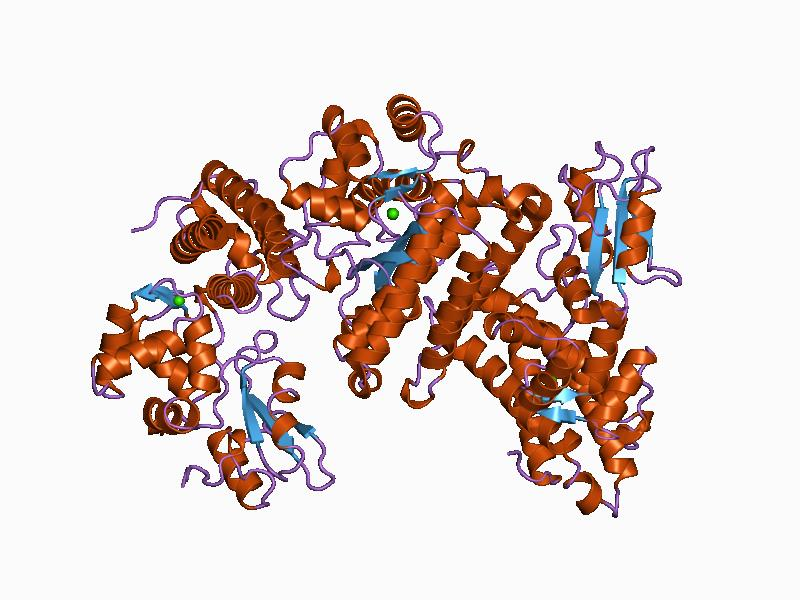
- structure of the n-terminal domain of cbl in complex with its binding site in zap-70

Identifiers
- Symbol: Cbl_N2
- Pfam: PF02761
- InterPro: IPR014741
- SCOP2: 1b47 / SCOPe / SUPFAM
Available protein structures:
- Pfam: structures / ECOD
- PDB: RCSB PDB; PDBe; PDBj
- PDBsum: structure summary

CBL proto-oncogene N-terminus, SH2-like domain
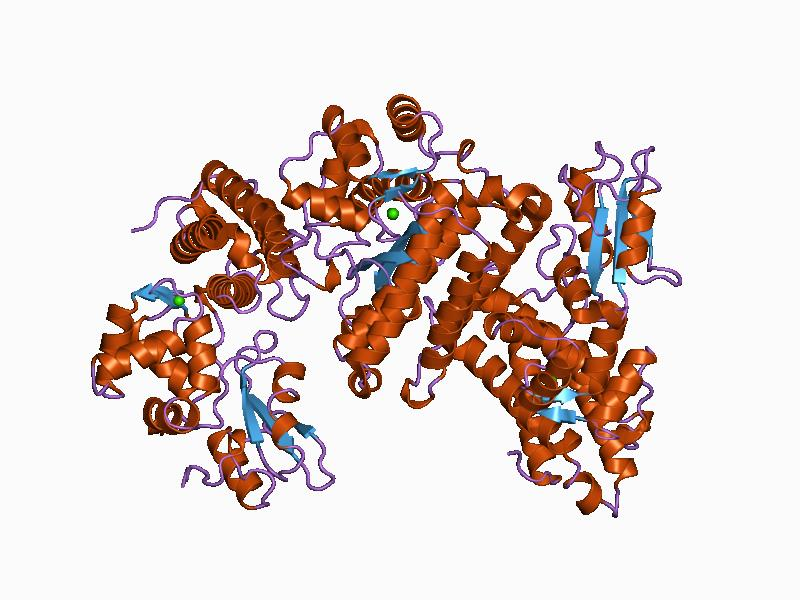
- structure of the n-terminal domain of cbl in complex with its binding site in zap-70

Identifiers
- Symbol: Cbl_N3
- Pfam: PF02762
- InterPro: IPR014742
- SCOP2: 1b47 / SCOPe / SUPFAM
- CDD: cd09920
Available protein structures:
- Pfam: structures / ECOD
- PDB: RCSB PDB; PDBe; PDBj
- PDBsum: structure summary

In molecular biology, the Cbl TKB domain (tyrosine kinase binding domain), also known as the phosphotyrosine binding (PTB) domain is a conserved region found at the N-terminus of Cbl adaptor proteins. This N-terminal region is composed of three evolutionarily conserved domains: an N-terminal four-helix bundle domain, an EF hand-like domain and a SH2-like domain, which together are known to bind to phosphorylated tyrosine residues.
