= CBL (gene) =

Mammalian gene

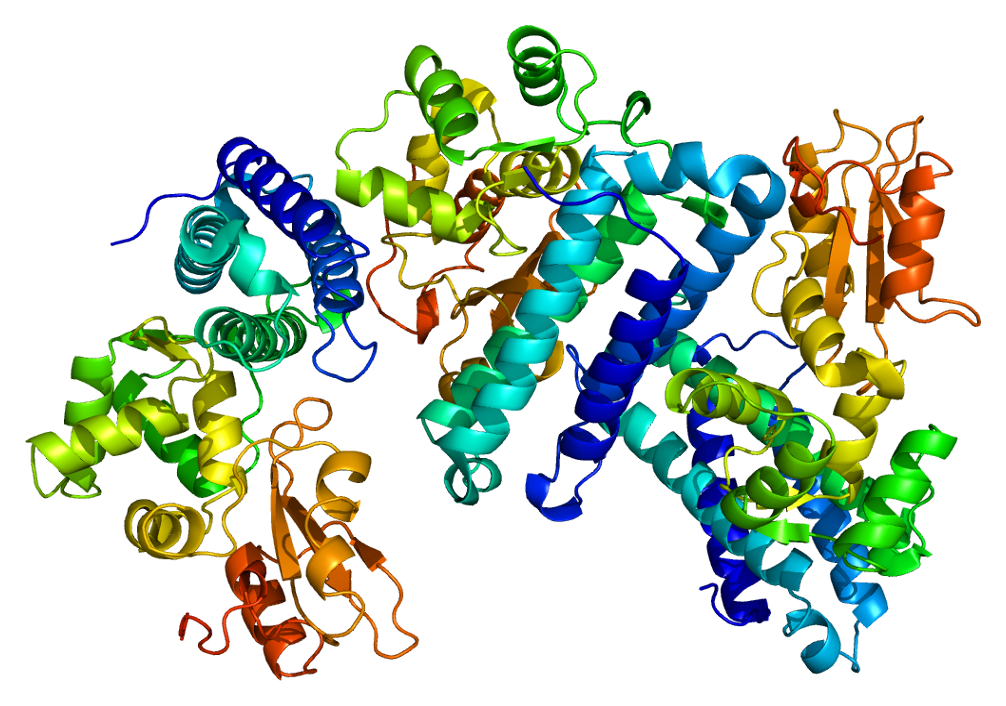

Identifiers
- Aliases: CBL, C-CBL2, FRA11B, NSLL, RNF55, Cbl proto-oncogene
- External IDs: OMIM: 165360; MGI: 88279; GeneCards: CBL
Available structures
PDB	Ortholog search: PDBe RCSB
PDB	List of PDB id codes 1B47, 1FBV, 1YVH, 2CBL, 2JUJ, 2K4D, 2OO9, 2Y1M, 2Y1N, 3BUM, 3BUN, 3BUO, 3BUW, 3BUX, 3OB1, 3OB2, 3PLF, 4A49, 4A4B, 4A4C, 4GPL
Enzyme activity
EC #	BRENDA	ExPASy	KEGG	MetaCyc
2.3.2.27	↗	↗	↗	↗

Gene location (Human)
Chr.	Chromosome 11 (human)
Band	11q23.3	Start	119,206,298 bp
Band	11q23.3	End	119,313,926 bp

Gene location (Mouse)
Chr.	Chromosome 9 (mouse)
Band	9 A5.1- A5.2|9 24.72 cM	Start	44,054,273 bp
Band	9 A5.1- A5.2|9 24.72 cM	End	44,145,346 bp
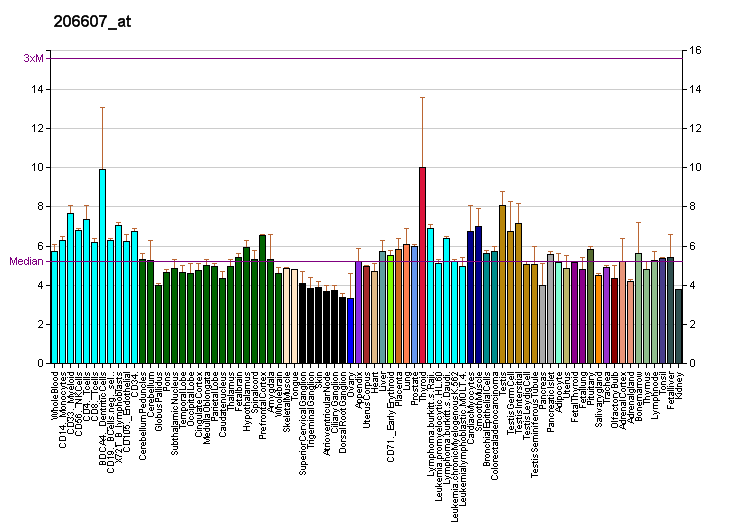
RNA expression pattern
Bgee	Human / Mouse (ortholog); Top expressed in: gonad; trigeminal ganglion; testicle; trabecular bone; saphenous vein; spinal ganglia; superficial temporal artery; nipple; blood; visceral pleura / Top expressed in: thymus; granulocyte; Rostral migratory stream; spermatocyte; tail of embryo; spermatid; mesenteric lymph nodes; lateral septal nucleus; anterior amygdaloid area; blood; More reference expression data
BioGPS	More reference expression data
Gene ontology
Molecular function	calcium ion binding; DNA-binding transcription factor activity; phosphotyrosine residue binding; signal transducer activity; metal ion binding; ubiquitin-protein transferase activity; protein binding; ephrin receptor binding; SH3 domain binding; phosphatidylinositol 3-kinase regulatory subunit binding; transferase activity; receptor tyrosine kinase binding; ubiquitin protein ligase activity; cadherin binding; epidermal growth factor receptor binding; protein kinase binding; protein tyrosine kinase binding
Cellular component	membrane; plasma membrane; nucleus; perinuclear region of cytoplasm; flotillin complex; growth cone; cytoplasm; cytosol; focal adhesion; axon; mast cell granule; membrane raft; Golgi apparatus; cilium; cell projection
Biological process	positive regulation of receptor-mediated endocytosis; negative regulation of epidermal growth factor receptor signaling pathway; epidermal growth factor receptor signaling pathway; negative regulation of apoptotic process; regulation of signaling; fibroblast growth factor receptor signaling pathway; cell surface receptor signaling pathway; protein ubiquitination; positive regulation of phosphatidylinositol 3-kinase signaling; transforming growth factor beta receptor signaling pathway; cellular response to DNA damage stimulus; cellular response to nerve growth factor stimulus; cellular response to platelet-derived growth factor stimulus; positive regulation of epidermal growth factor receptor signaling pathway; regulation of transcription, DNA-templated; neuron death; cellular response to oxygen-glucose deprivation; response to activity; response to starvation; response to ethanol; protein polyubiquitination; protein monoubiquitination; negative regulation of epidermal growth factor-activated receptor activity; male gonad development; response to gamma radiation; response to testosterone; entry of bacterium into host cell; mast cell degranulation; response to antibiotic; membrane organization; negative regulation of neuron death; cytokine-mediated signaling pathway; interleukin-6-mediated signaling pathway; ubiquitin-dependent protein catabolic process; signal transduction; regulation of Rap protein signal transduction; cellular response to epidermal growth factor stimulus; regulation of platelet-derived growth factor receptor-alpha signaling pathway
Sources:Amigo / QuickGO
Orthologs
Databases	NCBI: entry; OMA: entry
Species	Human	Mouse
Entrez	867	12402
Ensembl	ENSG00000110395	ENSMUSG00000034342
UniProt	P22681	P22682
RefSeq (mRNA)	NM_005188	NM_007619
RefSeq (protein)	NP_005179	NP_031645
Location (UCSC)	Chr 11: 119.21 – 119.31 Mb	Chr 9: 44.05 – 44.15 Mb
PubMed search
- Wikidata
View/Edit Human	View/Edit Mouse

E3 ubiquitin-protein ligase CBL is an enzyme that in humans is encoded by the CBL (Casitas B-lineage Lymphoma) gene. CBL gene is the founding member the Cbl family. The protein CBL which is an E3 ubiquitin-protein ligase involved in cell signalling and protein ubiquitination. Mutations to this gene have been implicated in a number of human cancers, particularly acute myeloid leukaemia.

== Discovery ==
In 1989 a virally encoded portion of the chromosomal mouse Cbl gene was the first member of the Cbl family to be discovered and was named v-Cbl to distinguish it from normal mouse c-Cbl. The virus used in the experiment was a mouse-tropic strain of Murine leukemia virus isolated from the brain of a mouse captured at Lake Casitas, California known as Cas-Br-M, and was found to have excised approximately a third of the original c-Cbl gene from a mouse into which it was injected. Sequencing revealed that the portion carried by the retrovirus encoded a tyrosine kinase binding domain, and that this was the oncogenic form as retroviruses carrying full-length c-Cbl did not induce tumor formation. The resultant transformed retrovirus was found to consistently induce a type of pre-B lymphoma, known as Casitas B-lineage lymphoma, in infected mice.

== Structure ==
Full length c-Cbl has been found to consist of several regions encoding for functionally distinct protein domains:

- N-terminal tyrosine kinase binding domain (TKB domain): determines the protein which it can bind to
- RING finger domain motif: recruits enzymes involved in ubiquitination
- Proline-rich region: the site of interaction between Cbl and cytosolic proteins involved in Cbl's adaptor functions
- C-terminal ubiquitin-associated domain (UBA domain): the site of ubiquitin binding

This domain structure and the tyrosine and serine-rich content of the protein product is typical of an "adaptor molecule" used in cell signalling pathways.

== Homologues ==
Three mammalian homologues have been characterized, which all differ in their ability to function as adaptor proteins due to the differing lengths of their C-terminal UBA domains:

1. c-Cbl: ubiquitously expressed, 906 and 913 amino acids in length in humans and mice respectively
2. Cbl-b: ubiquitously expressed, 982 amino acids long.
3. Cbl-c: lacks the UBA domain and is therefore only 474 amino acids in length. It is primarily expressed in epithelial cells however its function is poorly understood.

Both c-Cbl and Cbl-b have orthologues in D. melanogaster (D-Cbl) and C. elegans (Sli-1), hinting at a long evolutionary path for these proteins.

== Function ==
=== Ubiquitin ligase ===
Ubiquitination is the process of chemically attaching ubiquitin monomers to a protein, thereby targeting it for degradation. As this is a multi-step process, several different enzymes are involved, the final one being a member of the E3 family of ligases. Cbl functions as an E3 ligase, and therefore is able to catalyse the formation of a covalent bond between ubiquitin and Cbl's protein substrate - typically a receptor tyrosine kinase. The RING-finger domain mediates this transfer, however like other E3 ligases of the RING type no intermediate covalent bond is formed between ubiquitin and the RING-finger domain. The stepwise attachment of ubiquitin to the substrate receptor tyrosine kinase can lead to its removal from the plasma membrane and subsequent trafficking to the lysosome for degradation.

== Interactions ==
Cbl gene has been shown to interact with:

- Abl gene,
- ARHGEF7,
- C-Met,
- CD2AP,
- CSF1R.
- CRK,
- CRKL,
- EGFR,
- FRS2,
- FYN,
- Grb2,
- HCK,
- IGF1R,
- LCP2,
- NCK1,
- PDGFRA,
- PIK3R1,
- PIK3R2,
- PLCG1,
- PTK2B,
- PTPN11,
- SH2B2,
- SH3KBP1
- SHC1,
- SLA2,
- SORBS1,
- SORBS2,
- SPRY2,
- Syk,
- UBE2L3,
- VAV1,
- YWHAB,
- YWHAQ, and
- ZAP-70,
