= INPPL1 =

Protein-coding gene in the species Homo sapiens

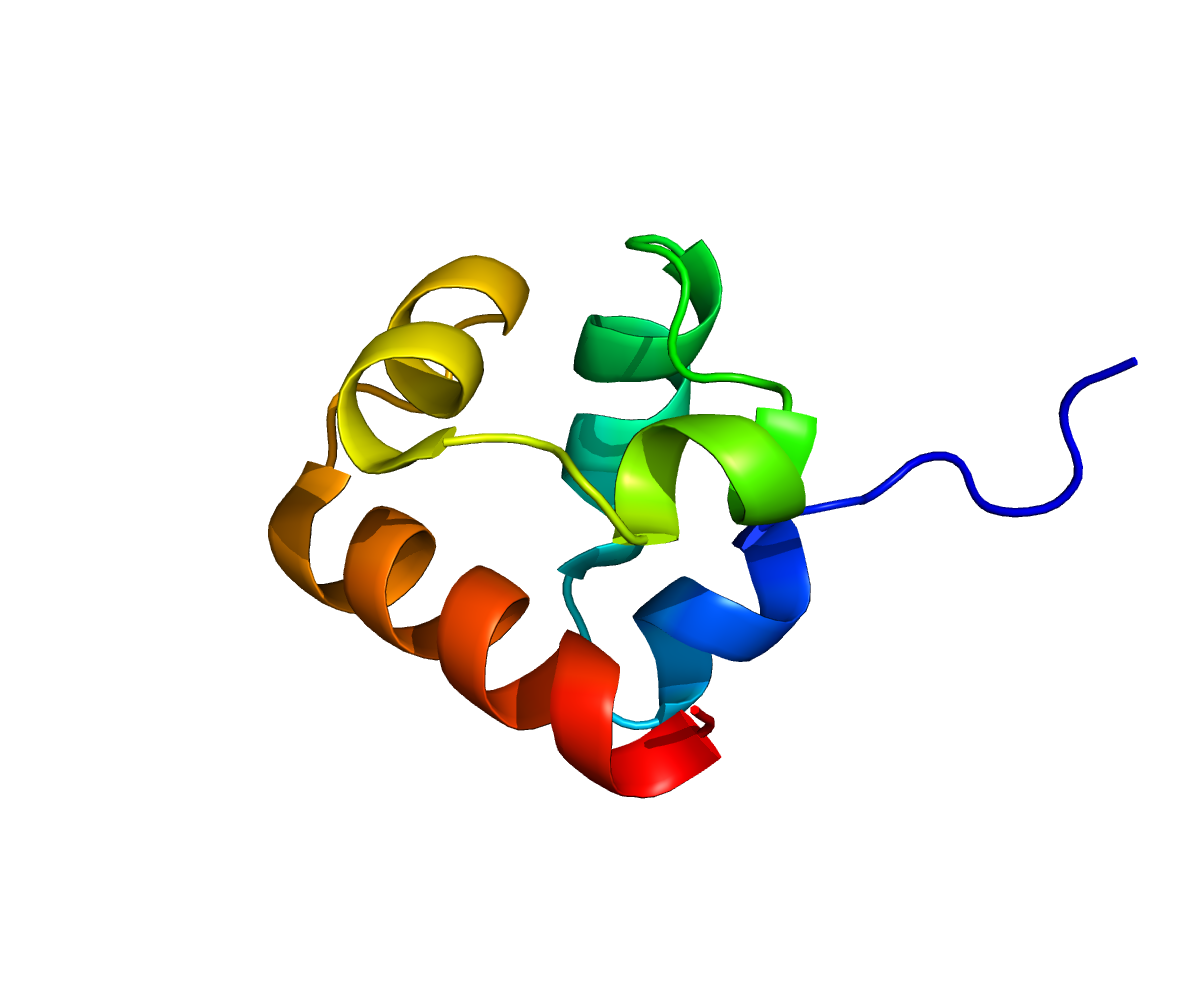

Identifiers
- Aliases: INPPL1, OPSMD, SHIP2, inositol polyphosphate phosphatase like 1
- External IDs: OMIM: 600829; MGI: 1333787; GeneCards: INPPL1
Available structures
| PDB | Ortholog search: PDBe RCSB |
| PDB | List of PDB id codes 2K4P, 2KSO, 2MK2, 3NR8, 4A9C |
Enzyme activity
| EC # | BRENDA | ExPASy | KEGG | MetaCyc |
|---|---|---|---|---|
| 3.1.3.86 | ↗ | ↗ | ↗ | ↗ |

Gene location (Human)
| Chr. | Chromosome 11 (human) |
| Band | 11q13.4 | Start | 72,223,701 bp |
| Band | 11q13.4 | End | 72,239,105 bp |

Gene location (Mouse)
| Chr. | Chromosome 7 (mouse) |
| Band | 7|7 E2 | Start | 101,471,839 bp |
| Band | 7|7 E2 | End | 101,487,436 bp |
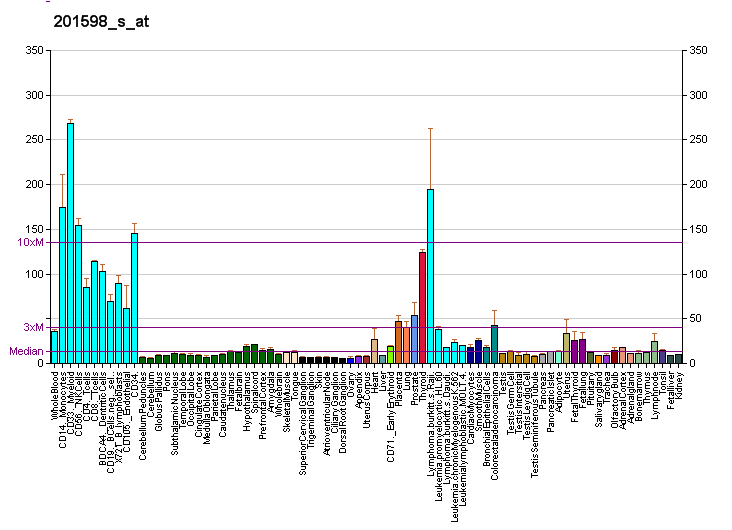
RNA expression pattern
| Bgee | Human / Mouse (ortholog); Top expressed in: gastric mucosa; stromal cell of endometrium; right lobe of thyroid gland; muscle layer of sigmoid colon; left lobe of thyroid gland; right uterine tube; right ovary; granulocyte; left uterine tube; apex of heart / Top expressed in: muscle of thigh; digastric muscle; extraocular muscle; Ileal epithelium; internal carotid artery; ventricular zone; lactiferous gland; cardiac muscle tissue of left ventricle; temporal muscle; ankle; More reference expression data |
| BioGPS | More reference expression data |
Gene ontology
| Molecular function | SH3 domain binding; SH2 domain binding; protein binding; actin binding; hydrolase activity; phosphatidylinositol-3,4,5-trisphosphate 5-phosphatase activity; inositol-1,3,4,5-tetrakisphosphate 5-phosphatase activity |
| Cellular component | Golgi apparatus; cell projection; membrane; filopodium; plasma membrane; cytoskeleton; lamellipodium; cytoplasm; cytosol |
| Biological process | endocytosis; cellular lipid metabolic process; actin filament organization; immune system process; inositol phosphate metabolic process; endochondral ossification; post-embryonic development; negative regulation of gene expression; response to insulin; cell adhesion; phosphatidylinositol dephosphorylation; glucose metabolic process; phosphatidylinositol biosynthetic process; ruffle assembly; negative regulation of cell population proliferation; cytokine-mediated signaling pathway |
Sources:Amigo / QuickGO
Orthologs
| Databases | NCBI: entry; OMA: entry |
| Species | Human | Mouse |
| Entrez | 3636 | 16332 |
| Ensembl | ENSG00000165458 | ENSMUSG00000032737 |
| UniProt | O15357 | Q6P549 |
| RefSeq (mRNA) | NM_001567 | NM_001122739; NM_010567 |
| RefSeq (protein) | NP_001558 | NP_001116211; NP_034697 |
| Location (UCSC) | Chr 11: 72.22 – 72.24 Mb | Chr 7: 101.47 – 101.49 Mb |
| PubMed search |
- Wikidata
| View/Edit Human | View/Edit Mouse |

SH2-domain containing Phosphatidylinositol-3,4,5-trisphosphate 5-phosphatase 2 is an enzyme that in humans is encoded by the INPPL1 gene.

INPPL1 encodes inositol polyphosphate-5 phosphatase-like 1, a protein that in addition to the phosphatase domain contains an SH2 (src-homology domain 2) motif.

== Interactions ==
INPPL1 has been shown to interact with:

- BCAR1,
- FLNC,
- SHC1, and
- SORBS1.
