= Tyrosine-protein kinase ABL1 =

Human protein-coding gene on chromosome 9

ABL1

Identifiers
- Aliases: ABL1, ABL proto-oncogene 1, non-receptor tyrosine kinase, ABL, JTK7, bcr/abl, c-ABL, c-p150, v-abl, CHDSKM, BCR-ABL, Genes, abl
- External IDs: OMIM: 189980; MGI: 87859; GeneCards: ABL1
Available structures
PDB	Ortholog search: PDBe RCSB
PDB	List of PDB id codes 1AB2, 1AWO, 1BBZ, 1JU5, 1OPL, 1ZZP, 2ABL, 2E2B, 2FO0, 2G1T, 2G2F, 2G2H, 2G2I, 2GQG, 2HIW, 2HYY, 2HZ0, 2HZ4, 2HZI, 2V7A, 3CS9, 3EG0, 3EG1, 3EG2, 3EG3, 3EGU, 3K2M, 3QRI, 3QRJ, 3QRK, 3T04, 3UE4, 3UYO, 3PYY, 4J9B, 4J9C, 4J9D, 4J9E, 4J9F, 4J9G, 4J9H, 4J9I, 4JJB, 4JJC, 4JJD, 4TWP, 4WA9, 4XEY, 4YC8, 5DC9, 5DC4, 5DC0, 2O88, 5HU9
Enzyme activity
EC #	BRENDA	ExPASy	KEGG	MetaCyc
2.7.10.2	↗	↗	↗	↗

Gene location (Human)
Chr.	Chromosome 9 (human)
Band	9q34.12	Start	130,713,016 bp
Band	9q34.12	End	130,887,675 bp

Gene location (Mouse)
Chr.	Chromosome 2 (mouse)
Band	2 21.86 cM|2 B	Start	31,578,388 bp
Band	2 21.86 cM|2 B	End	31,694,239 bp
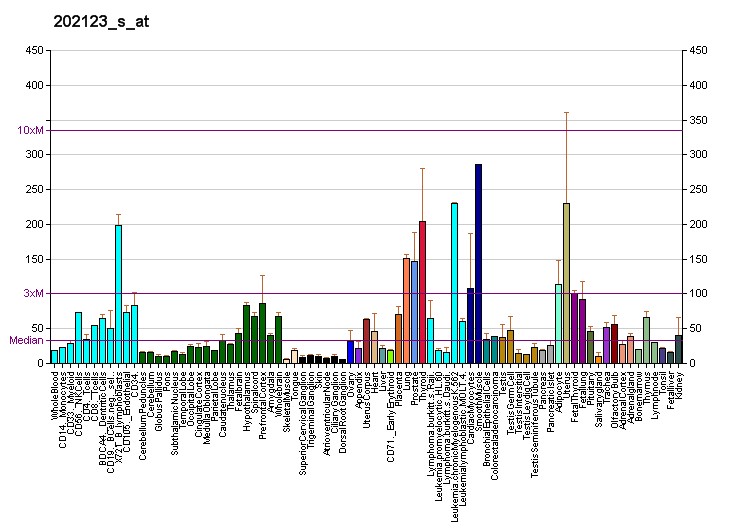
RNA expression pattern
Bgee	Human / Mouse (ortholog); Top expressed in: frontal pole; paraflocculus of cerebellum; middle frontal gyrus; muscle layer of sigmoid colon; gastric mucosa; stromal cell of endometrium; left uterine tube; ventricular zone; body of uterus; ganglionic eminence / Top expressed in: external carotid artery; internal carotid artery; Gonadal ridge; genital tubercle; tail of embryo; vas deferens; condyle; endocardial cushion; vestibular membrane of cochlear duct; ventricular zone; More reference expression data
BioGPS	More reference expression data
Gene ontology
Molecular function	actin monomer binding; protein domain specific binding; SH3 domain binding; kinase activity; protein C-terminus binding; signaling receptor binding; ATP binding; protein kinase activity; nicotinate-nucleotide adenylyltransferase activity; non-membrane spanning protein tyrosine kinase activity; metal ion binding; proline-rich region binding; magnesium ion binding; transferase activity; actin filament binding; protein binding; syntaxin binding; protein kinase C binding; DNA binding; nucleotide binding; manganese ion binding; mitogen-activated protein kinase binding; protein tyrosine kinase activity; four-way junction DNA binding; bubble DNA binding; phosphotyrosine residue binding; transcription coactivator activity; neuropilin binding; SH2 domain binding; ephrin receptor binding; supercoiled DNA binding; sequence-specific double-stranded DNA binding
Cellular component	cytoplasm; cytosol; nuclear membrane; membrane; extrinsic component of cytoplasmic side of plasma membrane; mitochondrion; actin cytoskeleton; perinuclear region of cytoplasm; cytoskeleton; nucleus; nucleolus; nucleoplasm; cell leading edge; nuclear body; dendrite; protein-containing complex; soma; postsynapse
Biological process	positive regulation of protein phosphorylation; B-1 B cell homeostasis; regulation of axon extension; neuromuscular process controlling balance; positive regulation of muscle cell differentiation; cellular response to DNA damage stimulus; protein phosphorylation; regulation of cell adhesion; regulation of microtubule polymerization; DNA damage induced protein phosphorylation; intrinsic apoptotic signaling pathway in response to DNA damage; positive regulation of ERK1 and ERK2 cascade; substrate adhesion-dependent cell spreading; platelet-derived growth factor receptor-beta signaling pathway; positive regulation of actin filament binding; B cell receptor signaling pathway; apoptotic process; negative regulation of endothelial cell apoptotic process; cerebellum morphogenesis; regulation of actin cytoskeleton reorganization; regulation of transcription, DNA-templated; epidermal growth factor receptor signaling pathway; Fc-gamma receptor signaling pathway involved in phagocytosis; establishment of protein localization; thymus development; negative regulation of phospholipase C activity; positive regulation of mitotic cell cycle; actin filament branching; spleen development; response to oxidative stress; phagocytosis; positive regulation of peptidyl-tyrosine phosphorylation; regulation of response to DNA damage stimulus; mitochondrial depolarization; positive regulation of Wnt signaling pathway, planar cell polarity pathway; platelet-derived growth factor receptor signaling pathway; regulation of endocytosis; activation of protein kinase C activity; regulation of actin cytoskeleton organization; phosphorylation; signal transduction in response to DNA damage; positive regulation of oxidoreductase activity; positive regulation of release of sequestered calcium ion into cytosol; negative regulation of I-kappaB kinase/NF-kappaB signaling; regulation of cell motility; positive regulation of microtubule binding; cell adhesion; regulation of autophagy; peptidyl-tyrosine autophosphorylation; alpha-beta T cell differentiation; regulation of cellular senescence; negative regulation of protein serine/threonine kinase activity; actin cytoskeleton organization; negative regulation of cellular senescence; positive regulation of osteoblast proliferation; mitotic cell cycle; activated T cell proliferation; endocytosis; negative regulation of cell-cell adhesion; B cell proliferation involved in immune response; cellular response to dopamine; positive regulation of cytosolic calcium ion concentration; positive regulation of neuron death; regulation of cell cycle; negative regulation of BMP signaling pathway; autophagy; B cell proliferation; negative regulation of ubiquitin-protein transferase activity; microspike assembly; positive regulation of apoptotic process; regulation of extracellular matrix organization; positive regulation of I-kappaB kinase/NF-kappaB signaling; negative regulation of ERK1 and ERK2 cascade; transitional one stage B cell differentiation; DNA mismatch repair; Bergmann glial cell differentiation; peptidyl-tyrosine phosphorylation; collateral sprouting; cellular response to lipopolysaccharide; negative regulation of mitotic cell cycle; cellular response to hydrogen peroxide; DNA repair; innate immune response; neural tube closure; post-embryonic development; neuron differentiation; cellular response to oxidative stress; regulation of cell population proliferation; protein autophosphorylation; neuroepithelial cell differentiation; integrin-mediated signaling pathway; positive regulation of endothelial cell migration; cell differentiation; regulation of Cdc42 protein signal transduction; neuropilin signaling pathway; endothelial cell migration; regulation of T cell differentiation; positive regulation of transcription by RNA polymerase II; T cell receptor signaling pathway; positive regulation of stress fiber assembly; positive regulation of focal adhesion assembly; DNA conformation change; positive regulation of cell migration involved in sprouting angiogenesis; positive regulation of substrate adhesion-dependent cell spreading; negative regulation of long-term synaptic potentiation; regulation of hematopoietic stem cell differentiation; regulation of modification of synaptic structure; positive regulation of blood vessel branching; positive regulation of actin cytoskeleton reorganization
Sources:Amigo / QuickGO
Orthologs
Databases	NCBI: entry; OMA: entry
Species	Human	Mouse
Entrez	25	11350
Ensembl	ENSG00000097007	ENSMUSG00000026842
UniProt	P00519	P00520
RefSeq (mRNA)	NM_007313; NM_005157	NM_001112703; NM_009594; NM_001283045; NM_001283046; NM_001283047
RefSeq (protein)	NP_005148; NP_009297	NP_001106174; NP_001269974; NP_001269975; NP_001269976; NP_033724
Location (UCSC)	Chr 9: 130.71 – 130.89 Mb	Chr 2: 31.58 – 31.69 Mb
PubMed search
- Wikidata
View/Edit Human	View/Edit Mouse

Tyrosine-protein kinase ABL1 also known as ABL1 is a protein that, in humans, is encoded by the ABL1 gene (previous symbol ABL) located on chromosome 9. c-Abl is sometimes used to refer to the version of the gene found within the mammalian genome, while v-Abl refers to the viral gene, which was initially isolated from the Abelson murine leukemia virus.

== Structure ==
The ABL1 protein is a non-receptor tyrosine kinase that contains both Src homology 3 (SH3) and Src homology 2 (SH2) domains, followed by a tyrosine kinase domain. These domains are involved in regulating its activity and interactions with other proteins.

ABL1 also contains signals that allow it to shuttle between the nucleus and cytoplasm, as well as regions that enable binding to the actin cytoskeleton.

== Function ==
The ABL1 proto-oncogene encodes a cytoplasmic and nuclear protein tyrosine kinase that has been implicated in processes of cell differentiation, cell division, cell adhesion, and stress response such as DNA repair. Activity of ABL1 protein is negatively regulated by its SH3 domain, and deletion of the SH3 domain turns ABL1 into an oncogene. The DNA-binding activity of the ubiquitously expressed ABL1 tyrosine kinase is regulated by CDC2-mediated phosphorylation, suggesting a cell cycle function for ABL1.

A characteristic translocation, t(9;22), results in the head-to-tail fusion of the BCR and ABL1 genes, leading to a fusion gene present in many cases of chronic myelogenous leukemia.

The ABL1 gene is expressed as either a 6- or a 7-kb mRNA transcript, with alternatively spliced first exons spliced to the common exons 2–11.

== Clinical significance ==
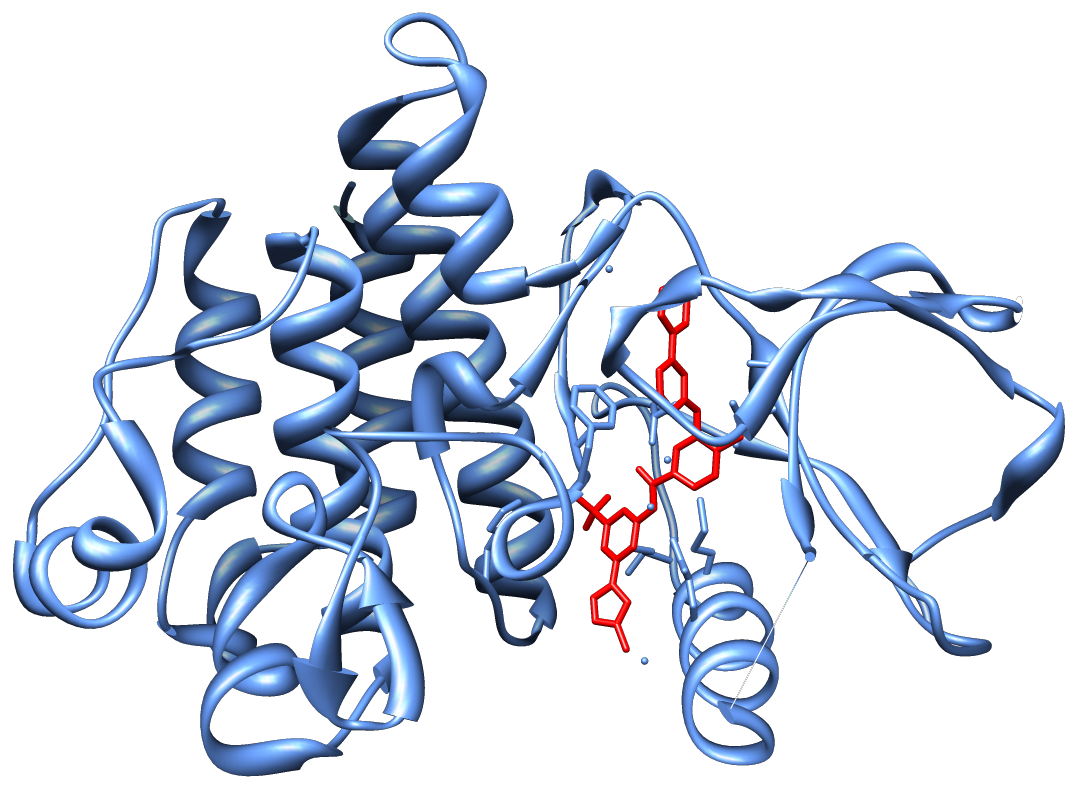
ABL1 kinase domain (blue) in complex with the second-generation Bcr-Abl tyrosine-kinase inhibitor nilotinib (red)

This gene is a partner in a fusion gene with the BCR gene in the Philadelphia chromosome, a characteristic abnormality in chronic myelogenous leukemia (CML) and rarely in some other leukemia forms. In CML, the gene is activated by being translocated within the BCR (breakpoint cluster region) gene on chromosome 22. This new fusion gene, BCR-ABL, encodes an unregulated, cytoplasm-targeted tyrosine kinase that allows the cells to proliferate without being regulated by cytokines. This, in turn, allows the cell to become cancerous.

The resulting BCR-ABL1 fusion protein exhibits constitutive tyrosine kinase activity and activates multiple downstream signaling pathways, including RAS/MAPK, PI3K/AKT, and Src family kinases, which promote uncontrolled cell proliferation and survival. This can also lead to a clonal myeloproliferative disorder.

The BCR-ABL protein can be inhibited by various small molecules. One such inhibitor is imatinib mesylate, which occupies the tyrosine kinase domain and inhibits BCR-ABL's influence on the cell cycle. Second generation BCR-ABL tyrosine-kinase inhibitors are also under development to inhibit BCR-ABL mutants resistant to imatinib.

== Interactions ==
ABL gene has been shown to interact with:

- ABI1,
- ABI2,
- ABL2,
- ATM,
- BCAR1,
- BCR,
- BRCA1,
- CAT,
- CBL,
- CRKL,
- DOK1,
- EPHB2,
- GPX1,
- GRB10,
- MTOR,
- GRB2,
- MDM2,
- NCK1,
- NEDD9,
- NTRK1,
- P73,
- PAG1,
- PAK2,
- PSTPIP1,
- RAD9A,
- RAD51,
- RB1,
- RFX1,
- RYBP,
- SHC1,
- SORBS2,
- SPTA1,
- SPTAN1,
- TERF1,
- VAV1, and
- YTHDC1.

== Regulation ==
There is some evidence that the expression of Abl is regulated by the microRNA miR-203.

== See also ==
- BCR gene
