= INSM1 =

Protein-coding gene in the species Homo sapiens

Identifiers
- Aliases: INSM1, IA-1, IA1, INSM transcriptional repressor 1
- External IDs: OMIM: 600010; MGI: 1859980; GeneCards: INSM1
Available structures
PDB	Ortholog search: PDBe RCSB
PDB	List of PDB id codes 2LV2, 3ZMS

Gene location (Human)
Chr.	Chromosome 20 (human)
Band	20p11.23	Start	20,368,104 bp
Band	20p11.23	End	20,370,949 bp

Gene location (Mouse)
Chr.	Chromosome 2 (mouse)
Band	2|2 G1	Start	146,063,841 bp
Band	2|2 G1	End	146,066,940 bp
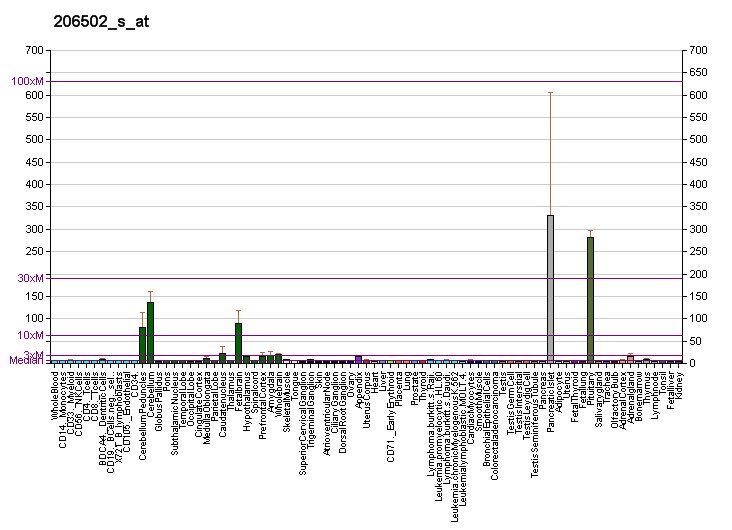
RNA expression pattern
Bgee	Human / Mouse (ortholog); Top expressed in: beta cell; ganglionic eminence; ventricular zone; pituitary gland; anterior pituitary; cerebellar vermis; cerebellar hemisphere; right hemisphere of cerebellum; paraflocculus of cerebellum; putamen / Top expressed in: medial ganglionic eminence; Rostral migratory stream; pineal gland; ventricular zone; islet of Langerhans; fossa; lumbar spinal ganglion; trigeminal ganglion; olfactory system; olfactory epithelium; More reference expression data
BioGPS	More reference expression data
Gene ontology
Molecular function	DNA binding; DNA-binding transcription factor activity; histone deacetylase binding; metal ion binding; RNA polymerase II cis-regulatory region sequence-specific DNA binding; DNA-binding transcription repressor activity, RNA polymerase II-specific; nucleic acid binding; chromatin DNA binding; cyclin binding; DNA-binding transcription factor activity, RNA polymerase II-specific
Cellular component	transcription repressor complex; nucleoplasm; nucleus
Biological process	sympathetic ganglion development; negative regulation of protein phosphorylation; noradrenergic neuron development; cell differentiation; regulation of transcription, DNA-templated; norepinephrine biosynthetic process; positive regulation of cell migration; pancreatic A cell differentiation; negative regulation of transcription by RNA polymerase II; nervous system development; transcription, DNA-templated; multicellular organism development; positive regulation of neural precursor cell proliferation; adrenal chromaffin cell differentiation; endocrine system development; positive regulation of cell differentiation; positive regulation of cell population proliferation; regulation of gene expression; cell cycle; type B pancreatic cell development; regulation of protein-containing complex assembly; type B pancreatic cell differentiation; endocrine pancreas development; negative regulation of cell population proliferation; transdifferentiation; regulation of cell cycle process; neuron differentiation
Sources:Amigo / QuickGO
Orthologs
Databases	NCBI: entry; OMA: entry
Species	Human	Mouse
Entrez	3642	53626
Ensembl	ENSG00000173404	ENSMUSG00000068154
UniProt	Q01101	Q63ZV0
RefSeq (mRNA)	NM_002196	NM_016889
RefSeq (protein)	NP_002187	NP_058585
Location (UCSC)	Chr 20: 20.37 – 20.37 Mb	Chr 2: 146.06 – 146.07 Mb
PubMed search
- Wikidata
View/Edit Human	View/Edit Mouse

Insulinoma-associated protein 1 is a protein that in humans is encoded by the INSM1 gene.

== Function ==
Insulinoma-associated 1 (INSM1) gene is intronless and encodes a protein containing both a zinc finger DNA-binding domain and a putative prohormone domain. This gene is a sensitive marker for neuroendocrine differentiation of human lung tumors.

== Interactions ==
INSM1 has been shown to interact with SORBS1.
