= SLA2 =

Protein-coding gene in the species Homo sapiens

Identifiers
- Aliases: SLA2, C20orf156, MARS, SLAP-2, SLAP2, Src-like-adaptor 2, Src like adaptor 2
- External IDs: OMIM: 606577; MGI: 1925049; GeneCards: SLA2
Available structures
PDB	Ortholog search: PDBe RCSB
PDB	List of PDB id codes 4M4Z

Gene location (Human)
Chr.	Chromosome 20 (human)
Band	20q11.23	Start	36,612,318 bp
Band	20q11.23	End	36,646,196 bp

Gene location (Mouse)
Chr.	Chromosome 2 (mouse)
Band	2|2 H1	Start	156,714,377 bp
Band	2|2 H1	End	156,729,112 bp
RNA expression pattern
Bgee	Human / Mouse (ortholog); Top expressed in: buccal mucosa cell; granulocyte; monocyte; blood; testicle; lymph node; spleen; appendix; oocyte; bone marrow cell / Top expressed in: thymus; zygote; primary oocyte; secondary oocyte; granulocyte; embryo; blood; embryo; pharynx; morula; More reference expression data
BioGPS	n/a
Gene ontology
Molecular function	protein binding; protein N-terminus binding; non-membrane spanning protein tyrosine kinase activity; signaling receptor binding; 1-phosphatidylinositol-3-kinase regulator activity
Cellular component	cytoplasm; late endosome; plasma membrane; endosome membrane; membrane; cytoplasmic vesicle; nucleoplasm; Golgi apparatus; intracellular membrane-bounded organelle; extrinsic component of cytoplasmic side of plasma membrane; phosphatidylinositol 3-kinase complex
Biological process	negative regulation of calcium-mediated signaling; negative regulation of B cell activation; intracellular receptor signaling pathway; negative regulation of transcription by RNA polymerase II; T cell activation; B cell mediated immunity; regulation of immune response; antigen receptor-mediated signaling pathway; positive regulation of signal transduction; transmembrane receptor protein tyrosine kinase signaling pathway; cell migration; cell differentiation; peptidyl-tyrosine autophosphorylation; regulation of cell population proliferation; innate immune response; regulation of signal transduction; regulation of phosphatidylinositol 3-kinase activity; negative regulation of insulin receptor signaling pathway; phosphatidylinositol phosphate biosynthetic process
Sources:Amigo / QuickGO
Orthologs
Databases	NCBI: entry; OMA: entry
Species	Human	Mouse
Entrez	84174	77799
Ensembl	ENSG00000101082	ENSMUSG00000027636
UniProt	Q9H6Q3	Q8R4L0
RefSeq (mRNA)	NM_032214; NM_175077	NM_029983; NM_001356495
RefSeq (protein)	NP_115590; NP_778252	NP_084259; NP_001343424
Location (UCSC)	Chr 20: 36.61 – 36.65 Mb	Chr 2: 156.71 – 156.73 Mb
PubMed search
- Wikidata
View/Edit Human	View/Edit Mouse

Src-like-adapter 2 is a protein that in humans is encoded by the SLA2 gene.

== Function ==
This gene encodes a member of the SLAP family of adapter proteins. The encoded protein may play an important receptor-proximal role in downregulating T and B cell-mediated responses and inhibits antigen receptor-induced calcium mobilization. This protein interacts with Cas-Br-M (murine) ecotropic retroviral transforming sequence c. Two transcript variants encoding distinct isoforms have been identified for this gene.

== Interactions ==
SLA2 has been shown to interact with Cbl gene.
