= ASAP2 =

Protein-coding gene in humans

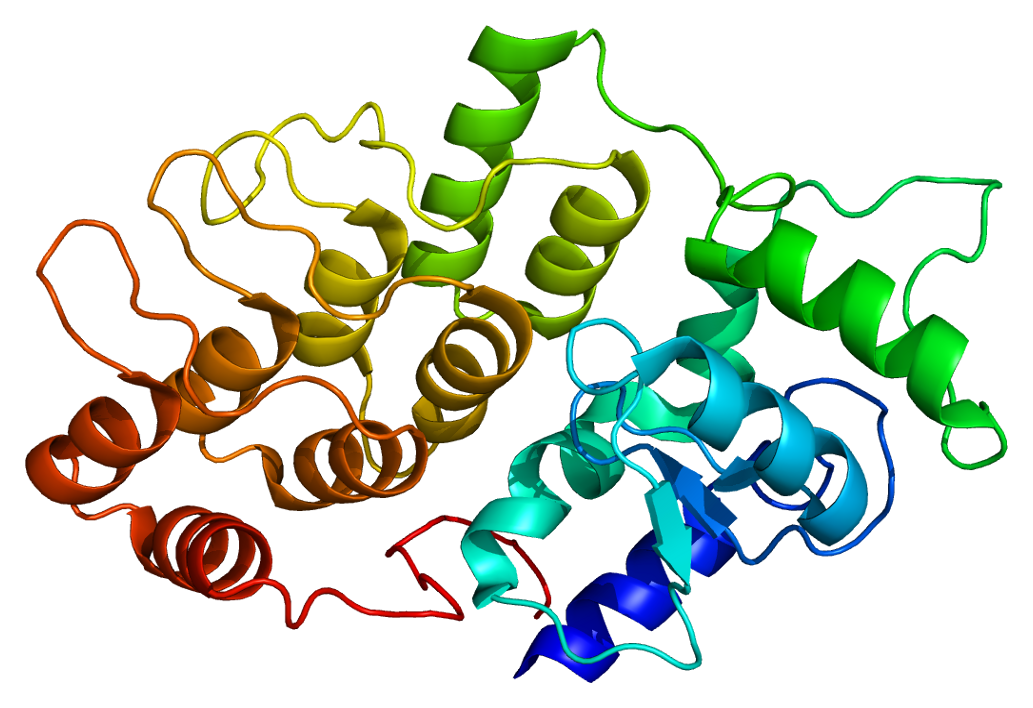

Identifiers
- Aliases: ASAP2, AMAP2, CENTB3, DDEF2, PAG3, PAP, Pap-alpha, SHAG1, ArfGAP with SH3 domain, ankyrin repeat and PH domain 2
- External IDs: OMIM: 603817; MGI: 2685438; GeneCards: ASAP2
Available structures
PDB	Ortholog search: PDBe RCSB
PDB	List of PDB id codes 1DCQ

Gene location (Human)
Chr.	Chromosome 2 (human)
Band	2p25.1|2p24	Start	9,206,765 bp
Band	2p25.1|2p24	End	9,405,683 bp

Gene location (Mouse)
Chr.	Chromosome 12 (mouse)
Band	12|12 A1.3	Start	21,040,460 bp
Band	12|12 A1.3	End	21,320,172 bp
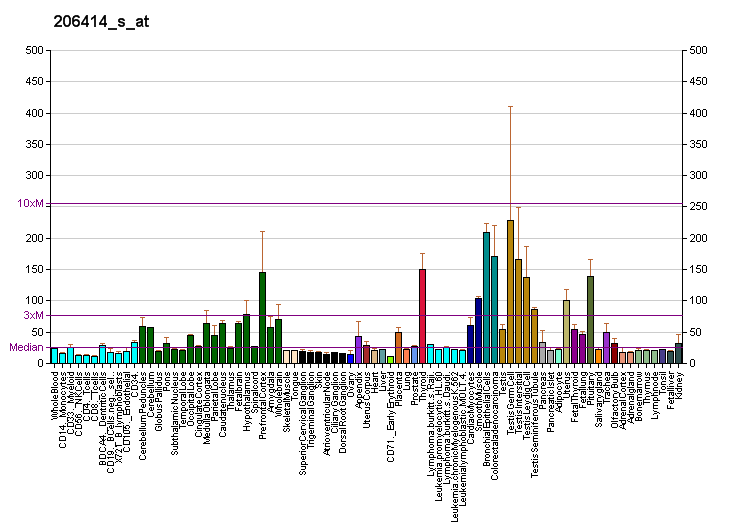
RNA expression pattern
Bgee	Human / Mouse (ortholog); Top expressed in: secondary oocyte; sperm; synovial joint; renal medulla; amniotic fluid; cartilage tissue; buccal mucosa cell; skin of hip; mucosa of colon; mucosa of sigmoid colon / Top expressed in: lumbar subsegment of spinal cord; ascending aorta; tail of embryo; epithelium of stomach; hand; genital tubercle; endothelial cell of lymphatic vessel; aortic valve; secondary oocyte; lateral geniculate nucleus; More reference expression data
BioGPS	More reference expression data
Gene ontology
Molecular function	protein binding; metal ion binding; GTPase activator activity
Cellular component	cytoplasm; Golgi cisterna membrane; plasma membrane; Golgi apparatus; membrane
Biological process	positive regulation of GTPase activity
Sources:Amigo / QuickGO
Orthologs
Databases	NCBI: entry; OMA: entry
Species	Human	Mouse
Entrez	8853	211914
Ensembl	ENSG00000151693	ENSMUSG00000052632
UniProt	O43150	Q7SIG6
RefSeq (mRNA)	NM_001135191; NM_003887	NM_001004364; NM_001098168; NM_001135192
RefSeq (protein)	NP_001128663; NP_003878	NP_001004364; NP_001091637; NP_001128664
Location (UCSC)	Chr 2: 9.21 – 9.41 Mb	Chr 12: 21.04 – 21.32 Mb
PubMed search
- Wikidata
View/Edit Human	View/Edit Mouse

Arf-GAP with SH3 domain, ANK repeat and PH domain-containing protein 2 is a protein that in humans is encoded by the ASAP2 gene.

This gene encodes a multidomain protein containing an N-terminal alpha-helical region with a coiled-coil motif, followed by a pleckstrin homology (PH) domain, an Arf-GAP domain, an ankyrin homology region, a proline-rich region, and a C-terminal Src homology 3 (SH3) domain. The protein localizes in the Golgi apparatus and at the plasma membrane, where it colocalizes with protein tyrosine kinase 2-beta (PTK2B). The encoded protein forms a stable complex with PTK2B in vivo. This interaction appears to be mediated by binding of its SH3 domain to the C-terminal proline-rich domain of PTK2B. The encoded protein is tyrosine phosphorylated by activated PTK2B. In vitro it shows strong GTPase-activating protein (GAP) activity towards the small GTPases ADP-ribosylation factor (ARF) 1 and ARF5 and weak activity towards ARF6. The encoded protein is believed to function as an ARF GAP that controls ARF-mediated vesicle budding when recruited to Golgi membranes. In addition, it functions as a substrate and downstream target for PTK2B and SRC, a pathway that may be involved in the regulation of vesicular transport.

== Interactions ==
ASAP2 has been shown to interact with PTK2B.
