= SH3KBP1 =

Protein-coding gene in the species Homo sapiens

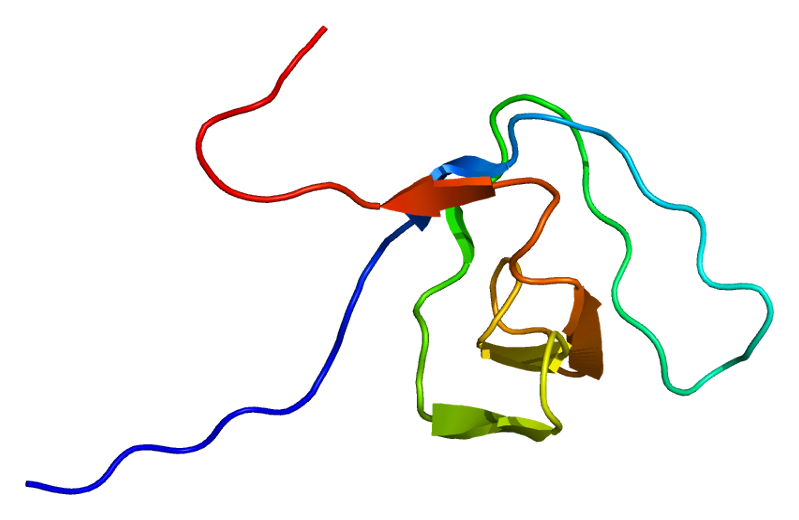

Identifiers
- Aliases: SH3KBP1, CD2BP3, CIN85, GIG10, HSB-1, HSB1, MIG18, SH3 domain containing kinase binding protein 1, IMD61, AGMX2
- External IDs: OMIM: 300374; MGI: 1889583; GeneCards: SH3KBP1
Available structures
PDB	Ortholog search: PDBe RCSB
PDB	List of PDB id codes 2BZ8, 2K6D, 2K9G, 2O2O, 2YDL, 5ABS, 2N64

Gene location (Human)
Chr.	X chromosome (human)
Band	Xp22.12	Start	19,533,977 bp
Band	Xp22.12	End	19,887,600 bp

Gene location (Mouse)
Chr.	X chromosome (mouse)
Band	X|X F4	Start	158,410,268 bp
Band	X|X F4	End	158,761,065 bp
RNA expression pattern
Bgee	Human / Mouse (ortholog); Top expressed in: secondary oocyte; myocardium of left ventricle; mucosa of ileum; lateral nuclear group of thalamus; skin of arm; cardiac muscle tissue of right atrium; inferior ganglion of vagus nerve; subthalamic nucleus; blood; white blood cell / Top expressed in: thymus; zygote; myocardium of ventricle; right ventricle; granulocyte; cardiac muscles; atrioventricular valve; secondary oocyte; stroma of bone marrow; extraocular muscle; More reference expression data
BioGPS	n/a
Gene ontology
Molecular function	SH3 domain binding; protein binding
Cellular component	cytosol; membrane; cell-cell junction; focal adhesion; plasma membrane; endocytic vesicle; synapse; cell junction; neuron projection; cytoskeleton; cytoplasmic vesicle membrane; cytoplasmic vesicle; cytoplasm
Biological process	negative regulation of epidermal growth factor receptor signaling pathway; endocytosis; cell-cell signaling; cytoskeleton organization; regulation of cell shape; cell migration; apoptotic process; membrane organization; axon guidance; actin filament organization
Sources:Amigo / QuickGO
Orthologs
Databases	NCBI: entry; OMA: entry
Species	Human	Mouse
Entrez	30011	58194
Ensembl	ENSG00000147010	ENSMUSG00000040990
UniProt	Q96B97; Q5JPT2	Q8R550
RefSeq (mRNA)	NM_001024666; NM_001184960; NM_031892; NM_001353890; NM_001353891 NM_001353892; NM_001353893; NM_001353894; NM_001353895; NM_001353897	NM_001135727; NM_001135728; NM_001290661; NM_001290664; NM_021389 NM_001374701
RefSeq (protein)	NP_001019837; NP_001171889; NP_114098; NP_001340819; NP_001340820 NP_001340821; NP_001340822; NP_001340823; NP_001340824; NP_001340826	NP_001129199; NP_001129200; NP_001277590; NP_001277593; NP_067364 NP_001361630
Location (UCSC)	Chr X: 19.53 – 19.89 Mb	Chr X: 158.41 – 158.76 Mb
PubMed search
- Wikidata
View/Edit Human	View/Edit Mouse

SH3 domain-containing kinase-binding protein 1 (synonyms - CIN85, in rodents - Ruk) is an adaptor protein that in humans is encoded by the SH3KBP1 gene.

== Function ==
CBL (MIM 165360) constitutively interacts with SH3 domain-containing proteins and, upon tyrosine phosphorylation, with SH2 domain-containing proteins. The SH3KBP1 gene encodes an 85-kD CBL-interacting protein that enhances tumor necrosis factor (MIM 191160)-mediated apoptotic cell death (Narita et al., 2001).[supplied by OMIM]

== Interactions ==
SH3KBP1 has been shown to interact with B-cell linker, Grb2, SH3GLB2, SH3GL3, SH3GL2, BCAR1, Epidermal growth factor receptor, CBLB, Cbl gene, SOS1, CRK and PAK2.
