= ABL2 =

Protein-coding gene in humans

Identifiers
- Aliases: ABL2, ABLL, ARG, ABL proto-oncogene 2, non-receptor tyrosine kinase
- External IDs: OMIM: 164690; MGI: 87860; GeneCards: ABL2
Available structures
PDB	Ortholog search: PDBe RCSB
PDB	List of PDB id codes 2ECD, 2KK1, 2XYN, 3GVU, 3HMI, 3ULR, 4EIH
Enzyme activity
EC #	BRENDA	ExPASy	KEGG	MetaCyc
2.7.10.2	↗	↗	↗	↗

Gene location (Human)
Chr.	Chromosome 1 (human)
Band	1q25.2	Start	179,099,330 bp
Band	1q25.2	End	179,229,684 bp

Gene location (Mouse)
Chr.	Chromosome 1 (mouse)
Band	1 G3|1 67.71 cM	Start	156,386,356 bp
Band	1 G3|1 67.71 cM	End	156,477,138 bp
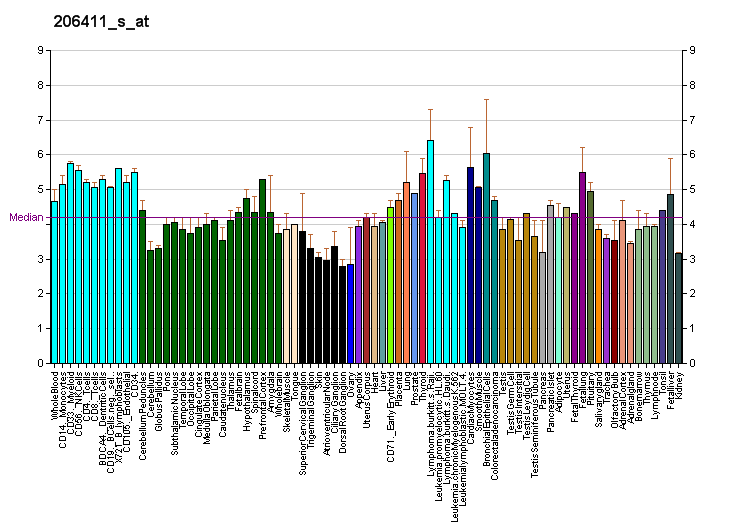
RNA expression pattern
Bgee	Human / Mouse (ortholog); Top expressed in: tendon of biceps brachii; buccal mucosa cell; sural nerve; visceral pleura; parietal pleura; middle temporal gyrus; Brodmann area 23; tibia; secondary oocyte; cerebellar vermis / Top expressed in: Rostral migratory stream; secondary oocyte; primary oocyte; otolith organ; zygote; utricle; endothelial cell of lymphatic vessel; hand; lumbar subsegment of spinal cord; foot; More reference expression data
BioGPS	More reference expression data
Gene ontology
Molecular function	transferase activity; protein kinase activity; nucleotide binding; actin monomer binding; manganese ion binding; non-membrane spanning protein tyrosine kinase activity; metal ion binding; kinase activity; actin filament binding; protein binding; signaling receptor binding; ATP binding; magnesium ion binding; protein tyrosine kinase activity; phosphotyrosine residue binding
Cellular component	cytoplasm; cytosol; extrinsic component of cytoplasmic side of plasma membrane; actin cytoskeleton; cytoskeleton
Biological process	cellular response to retinoic acid; regulation of actin cytoskeleton reorganization; phosphorylation; positive regulation of phospholipase C activity; transmembrane receptor protein tyrosine kinase signaling pathway; positive regulation of cytosolic calcium ion concentration; positive regulation of oxidoreductase activity; regulation of cell motility; protein phosphorylation; cell adhesion; regulation of cell population proliferation; positive regulation of neuron projection development; peptidyl-tyrosine autophosphorylation; peptidyl-tyrosine phosphorylation; innate immune response; signal transduction; regulation of autophagy; regulation of endocytosis; regulation of cell adhesion; cell differentiation; negative regulation of Rho protein signal transduction; exploration behavior
Sources:Amigo / QuickGO
Orthologs
Databases	NCBI: entry; OMA: entry
Species	Human	Mouse
Entrez	27	11352
Ensembl	ENSG00000143322	ENSMUSG00000026596
UniProt	P42684	Q4JIM5
RefSeq (mRNA)	NM_001136000; NM_001136001; NM_001168236; NM_001168237; NM_001168238 NM_001168239; NM_005158; NM_007314	NM_001136104; NM_009595
RefSeq (protein)	NP_001129472; NP_001129473; NP_001161708; NP_001161709; NP_001161710 NP_001161711; NP_005149; NP_009298	n/a
Location (UCSC)	Chr 1: 179.1 – 179.23 Mb	Chr 1: 156.39 – 156.48 Mb
PubMed search
- Wikidata
View/Edit Human	View/Edit Mouse

Tyrosine-protein kinase ABL2 also known as Abelson-related gene (Arg) is an enzyme that in humans is encoded by the ABL2 gene.

== Function ==
ABL2 is a cytoplasmic tyrosine kinase which is closely related to but distinct from ABL1. The similarity of the proteins includes the tyrosine kinase domains and extends amino-terminal to include the SH2 and SH3 domains. ABL2 is expressed in both normal and tumor cells. The expression of ABL2 gene is higher in KRAS mutant non-small cell lung cancer. The ABL2 gene product is expressed as two variants bearing different amino termini, both approximately 12-kb in length.

== Interactions ==
ABL2 has been shown to interact with three proteins: Abl gene, catalase, and SORBS2. The protein Abl gene is also known as abelson murine leukemia viral oncogene homolog 1 and is a protein that is encoded by the human ABL1 gene. Catalase is a common enzyme that catalyzes the decomposition of hydrogen peroxide to water and oxygen. SORBS2 is also known as Sorbin and SH3 domain-containing protein 2 and is a protein encoded by the SORBS2 gene in humans.
