= SORBS2 =

Protein-coding gene in the species Homo sapiens

Identifiers
- Aliases: SORBS2, ARGBP2, PRO0618, sorbin and SH3 domain containing 2
- External IDs: OMIM: 616349; MGI: 1924574; GeneCards: SORBS2
Available structures
PDB	Ortholog search: PDBe RCSB
PDB	List of PDB id codes 4IGZ

Gene location (Human)
Chr.	Chromosome 4 (human)
Band	4q35.1	Start	185,585,444 bp
Band	4q35.1	End	185,956,652 bp

Gene location (Mouse)
Chr.	Chromosome 8 (mouse)
Band	8|8 B1.1	Start	45,960,825 bp
Band	8|8 B1.1	End	46,280,943 bp
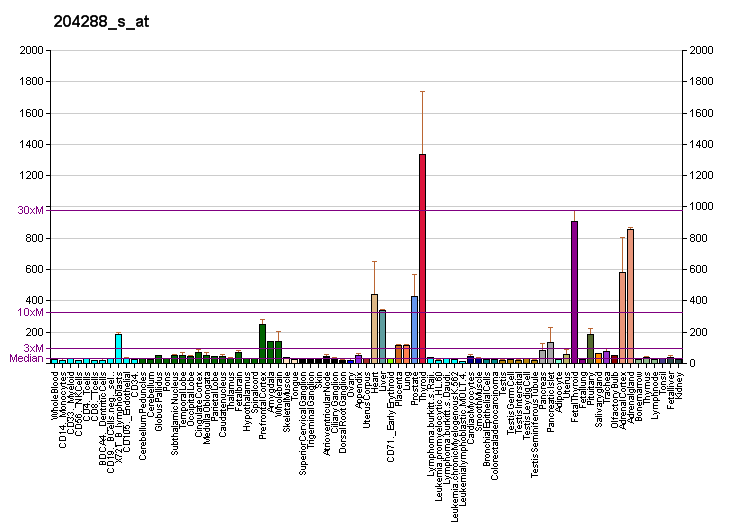
RNA expression pattern
Bgee	Human / Mouse (ortholog); Top expressed in: right ventricle; popliteal artery; tibial arteries; myocardium of left ventricle; right coronary artery; cardiac muscle tissue of right atrium; retinal pigment epithelium; right adrenal cortex; left adrenal cortex; apex of heart / Top expressed in: otolith organ; utricle; gastrula; myocardium of ventricle; atrioventricular valve; decidua; atrium; parotid gland; piriform cortex; left ventricle; More reference expression data
BioGPS	More reference expression data
Gene ontology
Molecular function	structural constituent of cytoskeleton; protein binding; cytoskeletal anchor activity; structural constituent of muscle; RNA binding; nucleic acid binding
Cellular component	cytoplasm; cell projection; membrane; focal adhesion; plasma membrane; cell junction; Z discdkac; apical plasma membrane; actin cytoskeleton; perinuclear region of cytoplasm; nucleus; lamellipodium; nucleoplasm
Biological process	cell growth involved in cardiac muscle cell development; actin filament organization; Notch signaling pathway; biological process
Sources:Amigo / QuickGO
Orthologs
Databases	NCBI: entry; OMA: entry
Species	Human	Mouse
Entrez	8470	234214
Ensembl	ENSG00000154556	ENSMUSG00000031626
UniProt	O94875	Q3UTJ2
RefSeq (mRNA)	NM_001145670; NM_001145671; NM_001145672; NM_001145673; NM_001145674 NM_001145675; NM_001270771; NM_003603; NM_021069	NM_001205219; NM_172752; NM_001310707; NM_001310708
RefSeq (protein)	NP_001139142; NP_001139143; NP_001139144; NP_001139145; NP_001139146 NP_001139147; NP_001257700; NP_003594; NP_066547	NP_001192148; NP_001297636; NP_001297637; NP_766340; NP_001389592 NP_001389593; NP_001389594; NP_001389595; NP_001389596; NP_001389597; NP_001389598; NP_001389599; NP_001389600; NP_001389601; NP_001389602; NP_001389603; NP_001389604
Location (UCSC)	Chr 4: 185.59 – 185.96 Mb	Chr 8: 45.96 – 46.28 Mb
PubMed search
- Wikidata
View/Edit Human	View/Edit Mouse

ArgBP2 protein, also referred to as Sorbin and SH3 domain-containing protein 2 is a protein that in humans is encoded by the SORBS2 gene. ArgBP2 belongs to the a small family of adaptor proteins having sorbin homology (SOHO) domains. ArgBP2 is highly abundant in cardiac muscle cells at sarcomeric Z-disc structures, and is expressed in other cells at actin stress fibers and the nucleus.

== Structure ==
ArgBP2 may exist in as many as 9 unique isoforms ranging from 52 kDa to 117 kDa (492 to 1100 amino acids). ArgBP2 belongs to the a small family of adaptor proteins having sorbin homology (SOHO) domains and three SH3 domains, which regulate cell adhesion, cytoskeletal organization and growth factor signaling; other members include CAP/ponsin and vinexin. The three SH3 domains are C-terminal, a serine-threonine rich domain resides in the middle, and the sorbin homology (SoHo) domain is N-terminal. The SH3 domains interact with Arg/Abl, vinculin. The SOHO domain interacts with flotillin found in lipid rafts.

== Function ==
The subcellular localization of this protein in epithelial and cardiac muscle cells suggests that ArgBP2 functions as an adapter protein to assemble signaling complexes in stress fibers, and that it is a potential link between Abl family kinases and the actin cytoskeleton. ArgBP2 contains several potential Abl phosphorylation sites; Arg and c-Abl represent the mammalian members of the Abelson family of non-receptor protein-tyrosine kinases. In non-muscle cells, ArgBP2 bids Cbl which enhances the degradation of c-Abl; and also Pyk2 which promotes cytoskeletal remodeling. ArgBP2 binding with flotillin at lipid rafts may indicate a role for ArgBP2 in vesicle trafficking and signal transduction. flotillin in skeletal muscle cells exhibits a striated pattern suggesting localization to T-tubules or sarcoplasmic reticular cisternae, though no precise role has been determined in cardiac cells. In cardiac muscle cells, pull-down experiments discovered ArgBP2 in complex with alpha actinin-2, vinculin, spectrin, paxillin, Pyk2 and flotillin, suggesting that ArgBP2 may be involved in myofibril assembly and Z-band signaling in cardiomyocytes, though functional studies are necessary to elucidate specific mechanisms. ArgBP2 has been linked to hypertrophic signaling, as a potent paracrine-acting RNA molecule shown to induce cardiac hypertrophy in mice, miR-21, acts on both ArgBP2 and PDLIM5 to trigger the hypertrophic response.

== Clinical Significance ==
Elevated levels of serum ArgBP2 and coordinate decreases in ArgBP2 in myocardial tissue were detected in the very early phase from patients post-myocardial infarction who died within 7 hours of the insult. Chromosome 4 pericentric inversion has been observed in 10 patients, with associated cardiac defects linked to terminal 4q35.1 deletions, which may affect SORBS2.

== Interactions ==
ArgBP2 has been shown to interact with:

- ABL,
- ABL2,
- ACTC1,
- CBL,
- FLOT1,
- PTK2B,
- PLDN, and
- VCL.
