= SH3GL3 =

Protein-coding gene in the species Homo sapiens

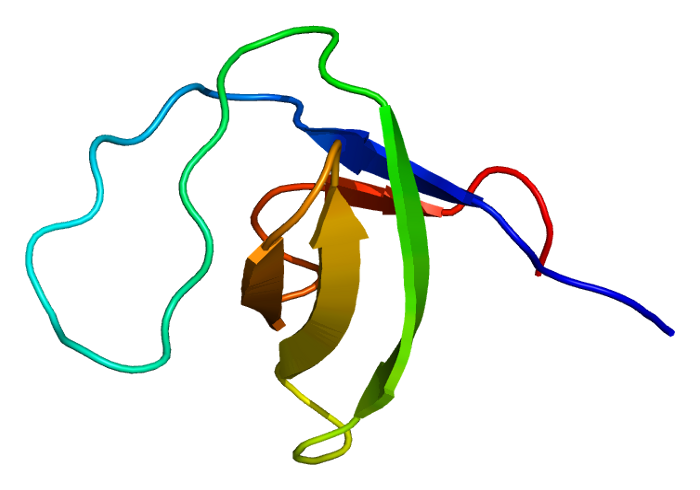

Identifiers
- Aliases: SH3GL3, CNSA3, EEN-B2, HsT19371, SH3D2C, SH3P13, SH3 domain containing GRB2 like endophilin A3, SH3 domain containing GRB2 like 3, endophilin A3
- External IDs: OMIM: 603362; MGI: 700011; GeneCards: SH3GL3
Available structures
PDB	Ortholog search: PDBe RCSB
PDB	List of PDB id codes 2EW3, 2Z0V

Gene location (Human)
Chr.	Chromosome 15 (human)
Band	15q25.2	Start	83,447,228 bp
Band	15q25.2	End	83,618,743 bp

Gene location (Mouse)
Chr.	Chromosome 7 (mouse)
Band	7 D3|7 47.15 cM	Start	82,173,840 bp
Band	7 D3|7 47.15 cM	End	82,307,419 bp
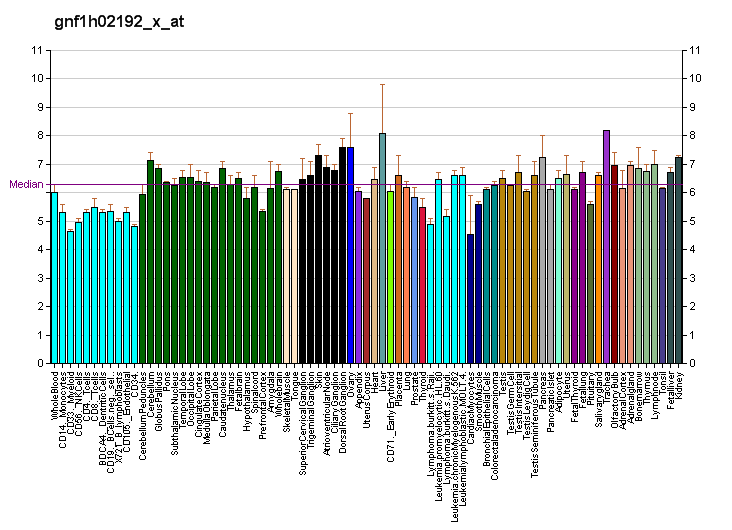

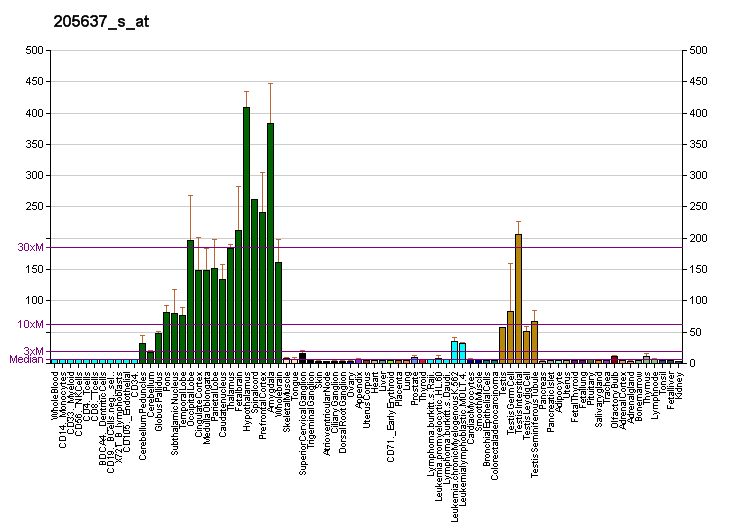

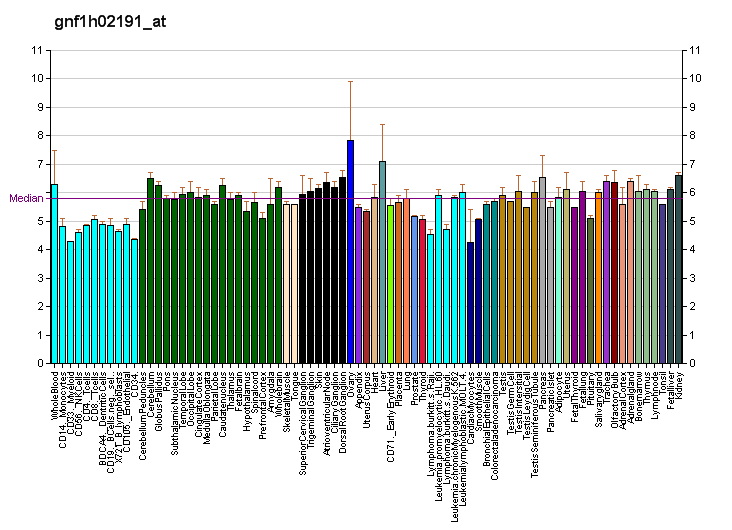
RNA expression pattern
Bgee	Human / Mouse (ortholog); Top expressed in: sperm; middle frontal gyrus; corpus callosum; C1 segment; Brodmann area 10; Brodmann area 46; hippocampus proper; Region I of hippocampus proper; left testis; substantia nigra / Top expressed in: spermatocyte; spermatid; superior cervical ganglion; seminiferous tubule; nucleus accumbens; optic nerve; barrel cortex; ventromedial nucleus; motor neuron; olfactory tubercle; More reference expression data
BioGPS	More reference expression data
Gene ontology
Molecular function	protein binding; identical protein binding; lipid binding; protein C-terminus binding
Cellular component	cytoplasm; endosome; early endosome; early endosome membrane; membrane; acrosomal vesicle; synapse; presynapse; postsynaptic endosome; glutamatergic synapse; postsynaptic density, intracellular component
Biological process	central nervous system development; endocytosis; signal transduction; positive regulation of neuron differentiation; negative regulation of clathrin-dependent endocytosis; regulation of clathrin-dependent endocytosis
Sources:Amigo / QuickGO
Orthologs
Databases	NCBI: entry; OMA: entry
Species	Human	Mouse
Entrez	6457	20408
Ensembl	ENSG00000140600	ENSMUSG00000030638
UniProt	Q99963	Q62421
RefSeq (mRNA)	NM_001301108; NM_001301109; NM_003027; NM_001324182; NM_001324183 NM_001324184; NM_001324185; NM_001324186; NM_001324187	NM_001277954; NM_001277955; NM_017400
RefSeq (protein)	NP_001288037; NP_001288038; NP_001311111; NP_001311112; NP_001311113 NP_001311114; NP_001311115; NP_001311116; NP_003018	NP_001264883; NP_001264884; NP_059096
Location (UCSC)	Chr 15: 83.45 – 83.62 Mb	Chr 7: 82.17 – 82.31 Mb
PubMed search
- Wikidata
View/Edit Human	View/Edit Mouse

Endophilin-A3 is a protein that in humans is encoded by the SH3GL3 gene.

== Interactions ==
SH3GL3 has been shown to interact with Huntingtin and SH3KBP1.
