= PTK2B =

Protein-coding gene in humans

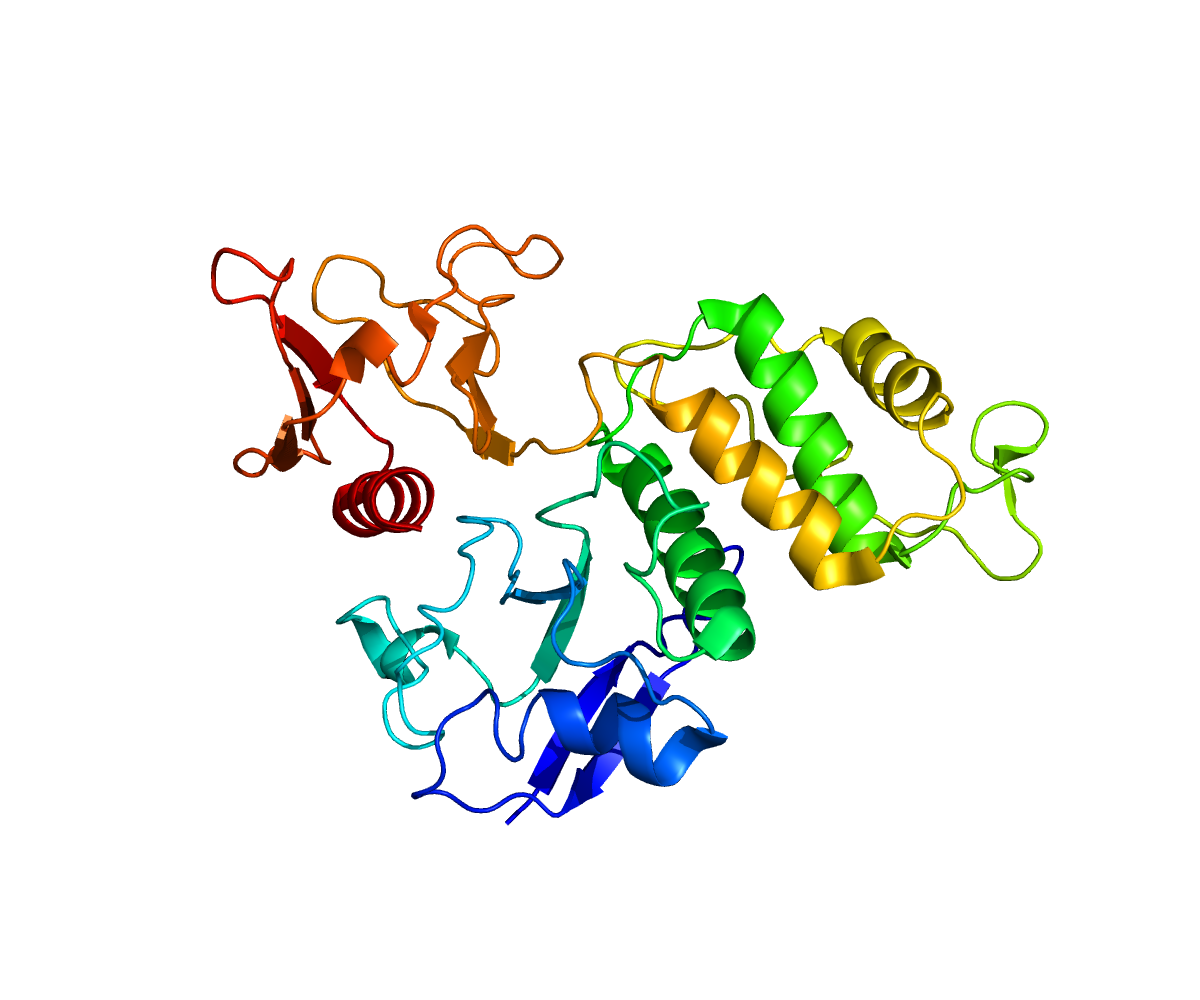

Identifiers
- Aliases: PTK2B, CADTK, CAKB, FADK2, FAK2, PKB, PTK, PYK2, RAFTK, protein tyrosine kinase 2 beta
- External IDs: OMIM: 601212; MGI: 104908; GeneCards: PTK2B
Available structures
PDB	Ortholog search: PDBe RCSB
PDB	List of PDB id codes 2LK4, 3CC6, 3ET7, 3FZO, 3FZP, 3FZR, 3FZS, 3FZT, 3GM1, 3GM2, 3GM3, 3H3C, 3U3F, 4EKU, 4H1J, 4H1M, 4R32, 4XEK, 4XEF, 4XEV
Enzyme activity
EC #	BRENDA	ExPASy	KEGG	MetaCyc
2.7.10.2	↗	↗	↗	↗

Gene location (Human)
Chr.	Chromosome 8 (human)
Band	8p21.2	Start	27,311,482 bp
Band	8p21.2	End	27,459,391 bp

Gene location (Mouse)
Chr.	Chromosome 14 (mouse)
Band	14 D1|14 34.36 cM	Start	66,390,706 bp
Band	14 D1|14 34.36 cM	End	66,518,501 bp
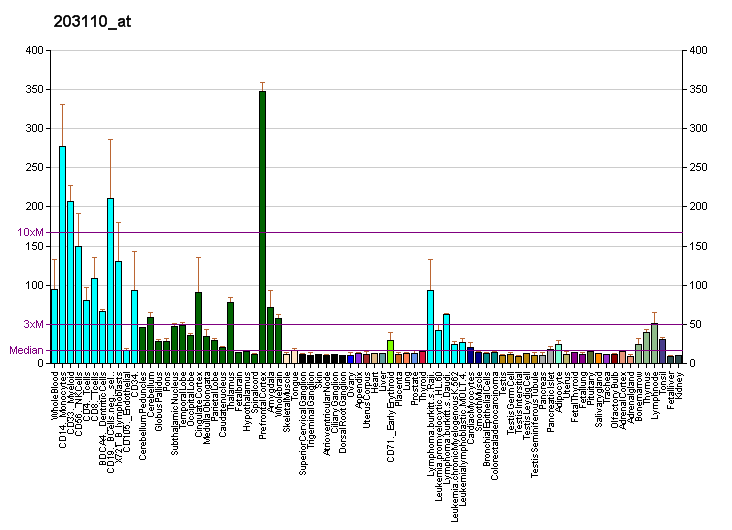
RNA expression pattern
Bgee	Human / Mouse (ortholog); Top expressed in: right hemisphere of cerebellum; granulocyte; Brodmann area 10; right frontal lobe; paraflocculus of cerebellum; monocyte; spleen; Brodmann area 9; bone marrow cell; anterior cingulate cortex / Top expressed in: dentate gyrus of hippocampal formation granule cell; superior frontal gyrus; CA3 field; primary visual cortex; olfactory tubercle; piriform cortex; entorhinal cortex; hippocampus proper; perirhinal cortex; granulocyte; More reference expression data
BioGPS	More reference expression data
Gene ontology
Molecular function	protein-containing complex binding; kinase activity; signaling receptor binding; ATP binding; protein kinase activity; non-membrane spanning protein tyrosine kinase activity; transferase activity; protein binding; nucleotide binding; 3-phosphoinositide-dependent protein kinase binding; NMDA glutamate receptor activity; signal transducer activity; calmodulin-dependent protein kinase activity; enzyme binding; protein tyrosine kinase activity; ubiquitin protein ligase binding; protein C-terminus binding
Cellular component	membrane; focal adhesion; extrinsic component of cytoplasmic side of plasma membrane; NMDA selective glutamate receptor complex; perinuclear region of cytoplasm; cytoskeleton; nucleus; cell projection; membrane raft; lamellipodium; apical dendrite; growth cone; plasma membrane; axon; soma; cell cortex; cell body; postsynaptic density; cell junction; dendrite; cytosol; cytoplasm; dendritic spine; postsynapse; glutamatergic synapse
Biological process	negative regulation of neuron apoptotic process; cellular response to retinoic acid; adaptive immune response; positive regulation of actin filament polymerization; tumor necrosis factor-mediated signaling pathway; positive regulation of JNK cascade; regulation of angiogenesis; marginal zone B cell differentiation; negative regulation of muscle cell apoptotic process; positive regulation of translation; stress fiber assembly; negative regulation of ossification; protein phosphorylation; cell surface receptor signaling pathway; vascular endothelial growth factor receptor signaling pathway; regulation of cell adhesion; positive regulation of reactive oxygen species metabolic process; angiogenesis; positive regulation of ERK1 and ERK2 cascade; long-term depression; positive regulation of excitatory postsynaptic potential; regulation of cGMP-mediated signaling; response to ethanol; neuron projection development; negative regulation of cell population proliferation; response to cocaine; apoptotic process; regulation of actin cytoskeleton reorganization; positive regulation of protein metabolic process; epidermal growth factor receptor signaling pathway; actin filament organization; response to reactive oxygen species; chemokine-mediated signaling pathway; response to mechanical stimulus; signal complex assembly; bone resorption; response to lithium ion; response to osmotic stress; positive regulation of cell growth; positive regulation of nitric-oxide synthase activity; positive regulation of synaptic transmission, glutamatergic; ionotropic glutamate receptor signaling pathway; response to organonitrogen compound; positive regulation of DNA biosynthetic process; positive regulation of peptidyl-tyrosine phosphorylation; protein autophosphorylation; innate immune response; negative regulation of myeloid cell differentiation; response to immobilization stress; cell differentiation; phosphorylation; positive regulation of cell-matrix adhesion; positive regulation of JUN kinase activity; immune system process; regulation of release of sequestered calcium ion into cytosol; negative regulation of apoptotic process; sprouting angiogenesis; regulation of inositol trisphosphate biosynthetic process; response to glucose; cellular response to fluid shear stress; positive regulation of angiogenesis; response to calcium ion; regulation of NMDA receptor activity; cellular defense response; oocyte maturation; positive regulation of ubiquitin-dependent protein catabolic process; negative regulation of potassium ion transport; regulation of cell shape; peptidyl-tyrosine autophosphorylation; integrin-mediated signaling pathway; positive regulation of B cell chemotaxis; response to hormone; response to cAMP; regulation of nitric oxide biosynthetic process; regulation of establishment of cell polarity; response to hydrogen peroxide; regulation of macrophage chemotaxis; positive regulation of protein kinase activity; regulation of leukocyte chemotaxis; negative regulation of bone mineralization; regulation of cell migration; response to hypoxia; blood vessel endothelial cell migration; activation of GTPase activity; positive regulation of cell migration; regulation of bone mineralization; positive regulation of cytosolic calcium ion concentration; positive regulation of nitric oxide biosynthetic process; response to stress; MAPK cascade; positive regulation of phosphatidylinositol 3-kinase activity; positive regulation of endothelial cell migration; focal adhesion assembly; regulation of cell population proliferation; regulation of calcium-mediated signaling; positive regulation of cell population proliferation; positive regulation of neuron projection development; glial cell proliferation; activation of Janus kinase activity; peptidyl-tyrosine phosphorylation; regulation of ubiquitin-dependent protein catabolic process; signal transduction; long-term potentiation; cell adhesion; interleukin-7-mediated signaling pathway; interleukin-2-mediated signaling pathway; regulation of synaptic plasticity; protein-containing complex assembly
Sources:Amigo / QuickGO
Orthologs
Databases	NCBI: entry; OMA: entry
Species	Human	Mouse
Entrez	2185	19229
Ensembl	ENSG00000120899	ENSMUSG00000059456
UniProt	Q14289	Q9QVP9
RefSeq (mRNA)	NM_004103; NM_173174; NM_173175; NM_173176	NM_001162365; NM_001162366; NM_172498; NM_001360233
RefSeq (protein)	NP_004094; NP_775266; NP_775267; NP_775268	NP_001155837; NP_001155838; NP_766086; NP_001347162
Location (UCSC)	Chr 8: 27.31 – 27.46 Mb	Chr 14: 66.39 – 66.52 Mb
PubMed search
- Wikidata
View/Edit Human	View/Edit Mouse

Protein tyrosine kinase 2 beta is an enzyme that in humans is encoded by the PTK2B gene.

== Function ==
This gene encodes a cytoplasmic protein tyrosine kinase that is involved in calcium-induced regulation of ion channels and activation of the MAP kinase signaling pathway. The encoded protein may represent an important signaling intermediate between neuropeptide-activated receptors or neurotransmitters that increase calcium flux and the downstream signals that regulate neuronal activity.

The encoded protein undergoes rapid tyrosine phosphorylation and activation in response to increases in the intracellular calcium concentration , nicotinic acetylcholine receptor activation, membrane depolarization, or protein kinase C activation. In addition, SOCE-induced Pyk2 activation mediates disassembly of endothelial adherens junctions, via tyrosine (Y1981-residue) phosphorylation of VE-PTP.

This protein has been shown to bind a CRK-associated substrate, a nephrocystin, a GTPase regulator associated with FAK, and the SH2 domain of GRB2.

The encoded protein is a member of the FAK subfamily of protein tyrosine kinases but lacks significant sequence similarity to kinases from other subfamilies. Four transcript variants encoding two different isoforms have been found for this gene.

== Interactions ==
PTK2B has been shown to interact with:

- BCAR1,
- Cbl gene,
- ASAP2,
- DLG3,
- DLG4,
- Ewing sarcoma breakpoint region 1,
- FYN,
- GRIN2A,
- Gelsolin,
- NPHP1,
- PITPNM1,
- PTPN11,
- PTPN6,
- Paxillin,
- RAS p21 protein activator 1,
- RB1CC1,
- SORBS2,
- Src, and
- TGFB1I1,
- VE-PTP

== See also ==
- Tyrosine kinase
