= Sorb =

Sorb may refer to:

- Sorbs, a Slavic ethnic group
- Sorbus, a genus of trees

- Sorbus domestica, a species belonging to the Sorbus genus
- Sorbus aucuparia, a species belonging to the Sorbus genus
- Sorbus torminalis, a species belonging to the Sorbus genus

- Sorb, the fruit of the true service tree, a.k.a. sorb tree (Sorbus domestica)
- Sorption, the action of both absorption and adsorption
- SORB, the Sex Offender Registry Board, a Massachusetts government database
- SORB, Small Offset Rigid Barrier, an automotive crash test

== See also ==
- Sorbs (disambiguation)
