= Catalase =

Enzyme decomposing hydrogen peroxide

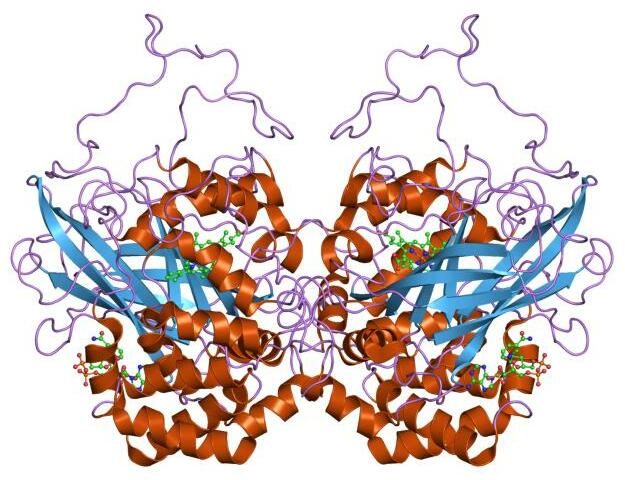

Identifiers
- Symbol: Catalase
- Pfam: PF00199
- InterPro: IPR011614
- PROSITE: PDOC00395
- SCOP2: 7cat / SCOPe / SUPFAM
- OPM superfamily: 370
- OPM protein: 3e4w
- CDD: cd00328
Available protein structures:
- PDB: IPR011614 PF00199 (ECOD; PDBsum)
- AlphaFold: IPR011614; PF00199

Catalase

Identifiers
- EC no.: 1.11.1.6
- CAS no.: 9001-05-2

Databases
- BRENDA: enzyme data
- ExPASy: NiceZyme view
- KEGG: enzyme entry
- MetaCyc: metabolic pathway
- Rhea: reactions
- PDB structures: RCSB PDB PDBe PDBsum
- Gene Ontology: AmiGO / QuickGO
Search
- PMC: articles
- PubMed: articles
- NCBI: proteins

CAT
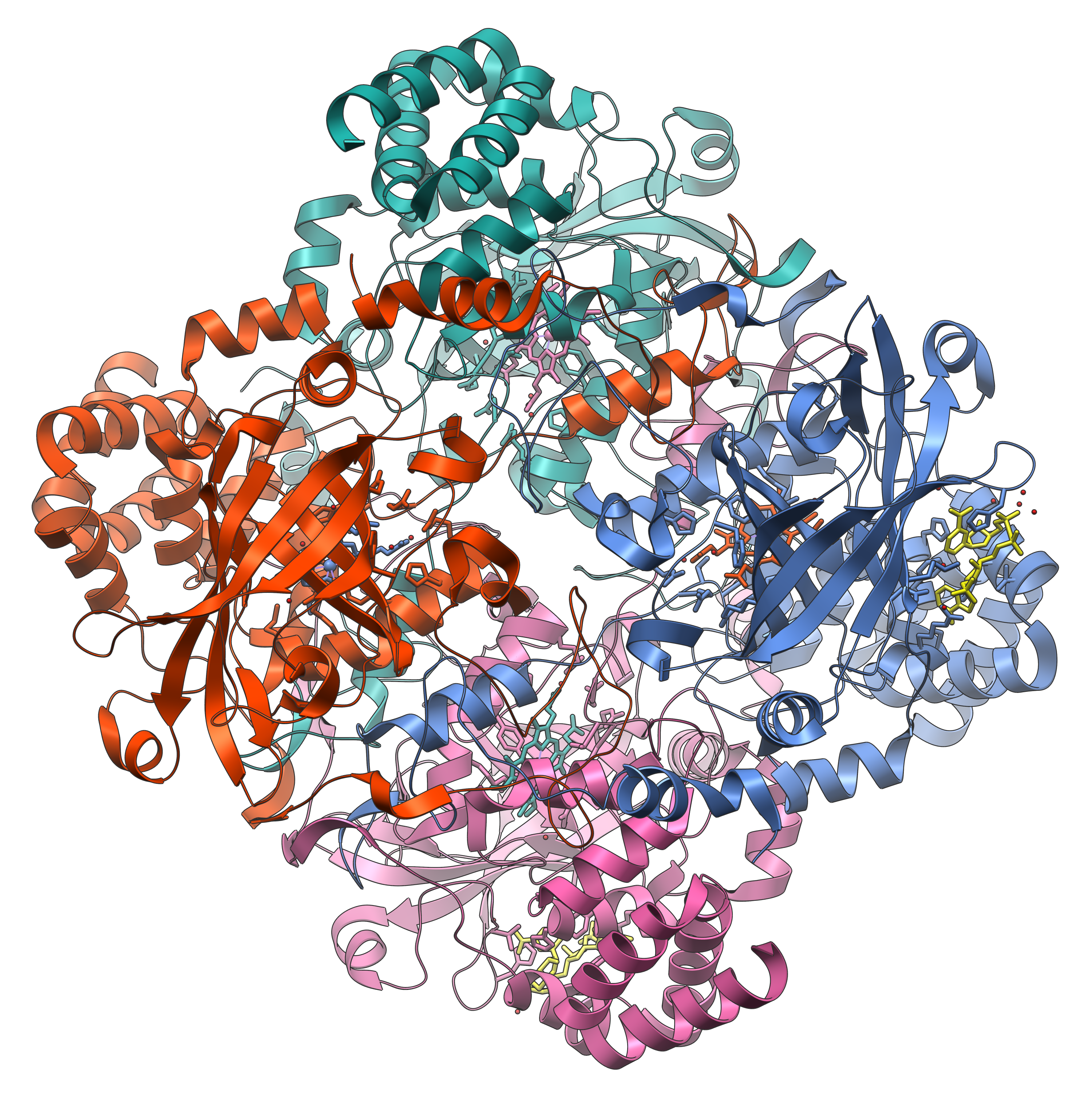

Identifiers
- Aliases: CAT, catalase
- External IDs: OMIM: 115500; MGI: 88271; GeneCards: CAT
Available structures
PDB	Ortholog search: PDBe RCSB
PDB	List of PDB id codes 1DGB, 1DGF, 1DGG, 1DGH, 1F4J, 1QQW
Enzyme activity
EC #	BRENDA	ExPASy	KEGG	MetaCyc
1.11.1.6	↗	↗	↗	↗

Gene location (Human)
Chr.	Chromosome 11 (human)
Band	11p13	Start	34,438,934 bp
Band	11p13	End	34,472,060 bp

Gene location (Mouse)
Chr.	Chromosome 2 (mouse)
Band	2 E2|2 54.43 cM	Start	103,284,194 bp
Band	2 E2|2 54.43 cM	End	103,315,505 bp
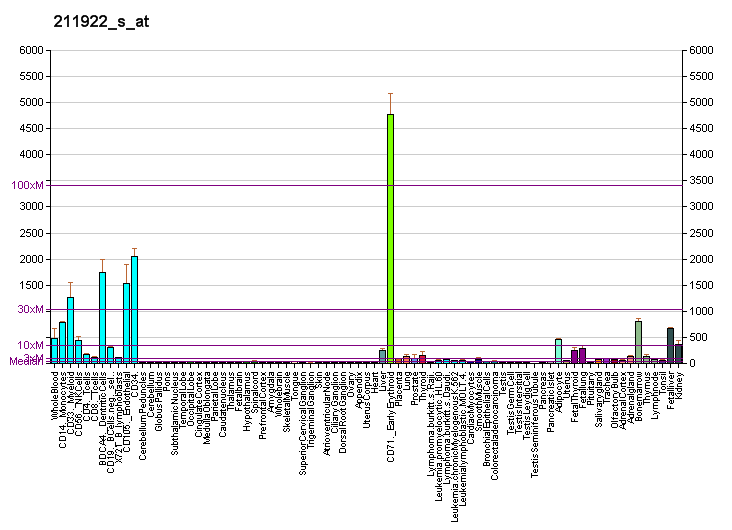

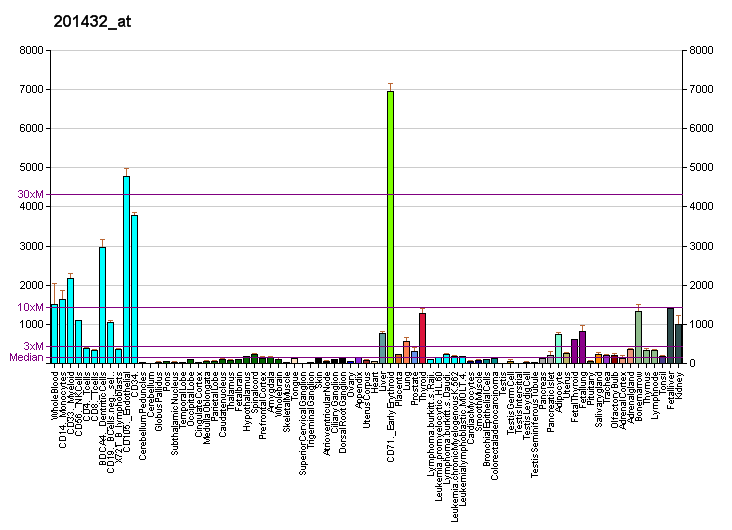
RNA expression pattern
Bgee	Human / Mouse (ortholog); Top expressed in: trabecular bone; kidney tubule; renal medulla; jejunal mucosa; liver; bone marrow; right lobe of liver; mucosa of ileum; skin of hip; skin of thigh / Top expressed in: left lobe of liver; blood; proximal tubule; tunica adventitia of aorta; right kidney; subcutaneous adipose tissue; stroma of bone marrow; brown adipose tissue; human kidney; intercostal muscle; More reference expression data
BioGPS	More reference expression data
Gene ontology
Molecular function	protein homodimerization activity; aminoacylase activity; peroxidase activity; metal ion binding; oxidoreductase activity, acting on peroxide as acceptor; catalase activity; antioxidant activity; heme binding; NADP binding; enzyme binding; oxidoreductase activity; signaling receptor binding; identical protein binding
Cellular component	cytosol; Golgi apparatus; membrane; intracellular membrane-bounded organelle; focal adhesion; mitochondrial intermembrane space; peroxisomal membrane; peroxisome; plasma membrane; peroxisomal matrix; endoplasmic reticulum; mitochondrion; lysosome; extracellular exosome; extracellular region; extracellular space; secretory granule lumen; ficolin-1-rich granule lumen
Biological process	response to phenylpropanoid; ureteric bud development; response to estradiol; response to hypoxia; response to cadmium ion; response to fatty acid; kidney development; response to inactivity; response to hyperoxia; cellular response to growth factor stimulus; ageing; cholesterol metabolic process; response to L-ascorbic acid; negative regulation of apoptotic process; response to ozone; response to oxidative stress; response to activity; protein tetramerization; response to vitamin E; response to insulin; response to vitamin A; aerobic dissimilation; response to lead ion; positive regulation of NF-kappaB transcription factor activity; osteoblast differentiation; hydrogen peroxide catabolic process; UV protection; positive regulation of phosphatidylinositol 3-kinase signaling; response to radiation; response to light intensity; response to ethanol; negative regulation of NF-kappaB transcription factor activity; triglyceride metabolic process; protein homotetramerization; response to UV; response to toxic substance; response to hydrogen peroxide; hemoglobin metabolic process; positive regulation of cell division; cellular oxidant detoxification; neutrophil degranulation; response to reactive oxygen species; cellular response to oxidative stress; protein targeting to peroxisome
Sources:Amigo / QuickGO
Orthologs
Databases	NCBI: entry; OMA: entry
Species	Human	Mouse
Entrez	847	12359
Ensembl	ENSG00000121691	ENSMUSG00000027187
UniProt	P04040	P24270
RefSeq (mRNA)	NM_001752	NM_009804
RefSeq (protein)	NP_001743	NP_033934
Location (UCSC)	Chr 11: 34.44 – 34.47 Mb	Chr 2: 103.28 – 103.32 Mb
PubMed search
- Wikidata
View/Edit Human	View/Edit Mouse

Catalase is a common enzyme found in nearly all living organisms exposed to oxygen (such as bacteria, plants, and animals) which catalyzes the decomposition of hydrogen peroxide to water and oxygen. It is a very important enzyme in protecting the cell from oxidative damage by reactive oxygen species (ROS). Catalase has one of the highest turnover numbers of all enzymes; one catalase molecule can convert millions of hydrogen peroxide molecules to water and oxygen each second.

Catalase is a tetramer of four polypeptide chains, each over 500 amino acids long. It contains four iron-containing heme groups that allow the enzyme to react with hydrogen peroxide. The optimum pH for human catalase is approximately 7, and has a fairly broad maximum: the rate of reaction does not change appreciably between pH 6.8 and 7.5. The pH optimum for other catalases varies between 4 and 11 depending on the species. The optimum temperature also varies by species.

== Structure ==
Human catalase forms a tetramer composed of four subunits, each of which can be conceptually divided into four domains. The extensive core of each subunit is generated by an eight-stranded antiparallel β-barrel (β1-8), with nearest neighbor connectivity capped by β-barrel loops on one side and α9 loops on the other. A helical domain at one face of the β-barrel is composed of four C-terminal helices (α16, α17, α18, and α19) and four helices derived from residues between β4 and β5 (α4, α5, α6, and α7). Alternative splicing may result in different protein variants.

== History ==
Catalase was first noticed in 1818 by Louis Jacques Thénard, who discovered hydrogen peroxide (H_{2}O_{2}). Thénard suggested its breakdown was caused by an unknown substance. In 1900, Oscar Loew was the first to give it the name catalase, and found it in many plants and animals. In 1937 catalase from beef liver was crystallized by James B. Sumner and Alexander Dounce and the molecular weight was measured in 1938.

The amino acid sequence of bovine catalase was determined in 1969, and the three-dimensional structure in 1981.

== Function ==
=== Molecular mechanism ===
While the complete mechanism of catalase is not currently known, the reaction is believed to occur in two stages:

H_{2}O_{2} + Fe(III)-E → H_{2}O + O=Fe(IV)-E(.+)

H_{2}O_{2} + O=Fe(IV)-E(.+) → H_{2}O + Fe(III)-E + O_{2}

Here Fe()-E represents the iron center of the heme group attached to the enzyme. Fe(IV)-E(.+) is a mesomeric form of Fe(V)-E, meaning the iron is not completely oxidized to +V, but receives some stabilising electron density from the heme ligand, which is then shown as a radical cation (.+).

As hydrogen peroxide enters the active site, it interacts with the amino acids Asn148 (asparagine at position 148) and His75, causing a proton (hydrogen ion) to transfer between the oxygen atoms. The free oxygen atom coordinates, freeing the newly formed water molecule and Fe(IV)=O. Fe(IV)=O reacts with a second hydrogen peroxide molecule to reform Fe(III)-E and produce water and oxygen. The reactivity of the iron center may be improved by the presence of the phenolate ligand of Tyr358 in the fifth coordination position, which can assist in the oxidation of the Fe(III) to Fe(IV). The efficiency of the reaction may also be improved by the interactions of His75 and Asn148 with reaction intermediates. The decomposition of hydrogen peroxide by catalase proceeds according to first-order kinetics, the rate being proportional to the hydrogen peroxide concentration.

Catalase can also catalyze the oxidation, by hydrogen peroxide, of various metabolites and toxins, including formaldehyde, formic acid, phenols, acetaldehyde and alcohols. It does so according to the following reaction:

H_{2}O_{2} + H_{2}R → 2H_{2}O + R

The exact mechanism of this reaction is not known.

Any heavy metal ion (such as copper cations in copper(II) sulfate) can act as a noncompetitive inhibitor of catalase. However, "Copper deficiency can lead to a reduction in catalase activity in tissues, such as heart and liver." Furthermore, the poison cyanide is a noncompetitive inhibitor of catalase at high concentrations of hydrogen peroxide. Arsenate acts as an activator. Three-dimensional protein structures of the peroxidated catalase intermediates are available at the Protein Data Bank.

=== Cellular role ===
Hydrogen peroxide is a harmful byproduct of many normal metabolic processes; to prevent damage to cells and tissues, it must be quickly converted into other, less dangerous substances. To this end, catalase is frequently used by cells to rapidly catalyze the decomposition of hydrogen peroxide into less-reactive gaseous oxygen and water molecules.

Mice genetically engineered to lack catalase are initially phenotypically normal. However, catalase deficiency in mice may increase the likelihood of developing obesity, fatty liver, and type 2 diabetes. Some humans have very low levels of catalase (acatalasia), yet show few ill effects.

The increased oxidative stress that occurs with aging in mice is alleviated by over-expression of catalase. Over-expressing mice do not exhibit the age-associated loss of spermatozoa, testicular germ and Sertoli cells seen in wild-type mice. Oxidative stress in wild-type mice ordinarily induces oxidative DNA damage (measured as 8-oxodG) in sperm with aging, but these damages are significantly reduced in aged catalase over-expressing mice. Furthermore, these over-expressing mice show no decrease in age-dependent number of pups per litter. Overexpression of catalase targeted to mitochondria extends the lifespan of mice.

In eukaryotes, catalase is usually located in a cellular organelle called the peroxisome. Peroxisomes in plant cells are involved in photorespiration (the use of oxygen and production of carbon dioxide) and symbiotic nitrogen fixation (the breaking apart of diatomic nitrogen (N_{2}) to reactive nitrogen atoms). Hydrogen peroxide is used as a potent antimicrobial agent when cells are infected with a pathogen. Catalase-positive pathogens, such as Mycobacterium tuberculosis, Legionella pneumophila, and Campylobacter jejuni, make catalase to deactivate the peroxide radicals, thus allowing them to survive unharmed within the host.

Like alcohol dehydrogenase, catalase converts ethanol to acetaldehyde, and drop-out studies in rodents suggest that it may be responsible for the majority of this reaction in the brain.

== Distribution among organisms ==
The large majority of known organisms use catalase in every organ, with particularly high concentrations occurring in the liver in mammals. Catalase is found primarily in peroxisomes and the cytosol of erythrocytes (and sometimes in mitochondria)

Almost all aerobic microorganisms use catalase. It is also present in some anaerobic microorganisms, such as Methanosarcina barkeri. Catalase is also universal among plants and occurs in most fungi.

One unique use of catalase occurs in the bombardier beetle. This beetle has two sets of liquids that are stored separately in two paired glands. The larger of the pair, the storage chamber or reservoir, contains hydroquinones and hydrogen peroxide, while the smaller, the reaction chamber, contains catalases and peroxidases. To activate the noxious spray, the beetle mixes the contents of the two compartments, causing oxygen to be liberated from hydrogen peroxide. The oxygen oxidizes the hydroquinones and also acts as the propellant. The oxidation reaction is very exothermic (ΔH = −202.8 kJ/mol) and rapidly heats the mixture to the boiling point.

Long-lived queens of the termite Reticulitermes speratus have significantly lower oxidative damage to their DNA than non-reproductive individuals (workers and soldiers). Queens have more than two times higher catalase activity and seven times higher expression levels of the catalase gene RsCAT1 than workers. It appears that the efficient antioxidant capability of termite queens can partly explain how they attain longer life.

Catalase enzymes from various species have vastly differing optimum temperatures. Poikilothermic animals typically have catalases with optimum temperatures in the range of 15–25 °C (59–77 °F), while mammalian or avian catalases might have optimum temperatures above 35 °C (95 °F), and catalases from plants vary depending on their growth habit. In contrast, catalase isolated from the hyperthermophile archaeon Pyrobaculum calidifontis has a temperature optimum of 90 °C (194 °F).

== Clinical significance and application ==
Hydrogen peroxide

Catalase is used in the food industry for removing hydrogen peroxide from milk prior to cheese production. Another use is in food wrappers, where it prevents food from oxidizing. Catalase is also used in the textile industry, removing hydrogen peroxide from fabrics to make sure the material is peroxide-free.

A minor use is in contact lens hygiene – a few lens-cleaning products disinfect the lens using a hydrogen peroxide solution; a solution containing catalase is then used to decompose the hydrogen peroxide before the lens is used again.

=== Bacterial identification (catalase test) ===
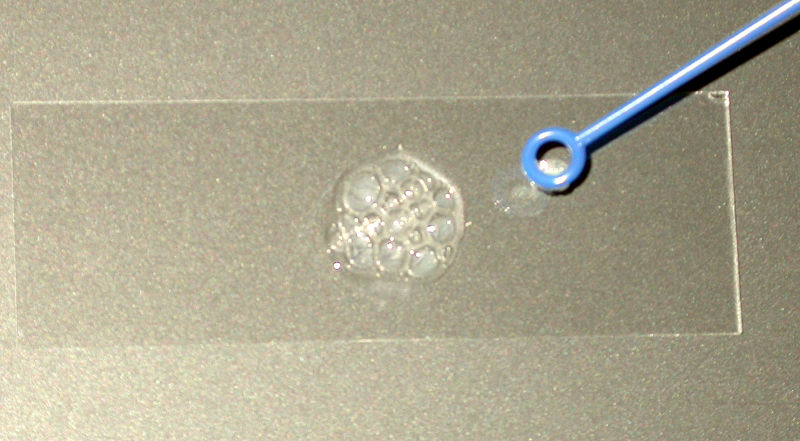
Positive catalase reaction

The catalase test is one of the three main tests used by microbiologists to identify species of bacteria. If the bacteria possess catalase (i.e., are catalase-positive), bubbles of oxygen are observed when a small amount of bacterial isolate is added to hydrogen peroxide. The catalase test is done by placing a drop of hydrogen peroxide on a microscope slide. An applicator stick is touched to the colony, and the tip is then smeared onto the hydrogen peroxide drop.

- If the mixture produces bubbles or froth, the organism is said to be 'catalase-positive'. Staphylococci and Micrococci are catalase-positive. Other catalase-positive organisms include Listeria, Corynebacterium diphtheriae, Burkholderia cepacia, Nocardia, the family Enterobacteriaceae (Citrobacter, E. coli, Enterobacter, Klebsiella, Shigella, Yersinia, Proteus, Salmonella, Serratia), Pseudomonas, Mycobacterium tuberculosis, Aspergillus, Cryptococcus, and Rhodococcus equi.
- If not, the organism is 'catalase-negative'. Streptococcus and Enterococcus spp. are catalase-negative.

While the catalase test alone cannot identify a particular organism, it can aid identification when combined with other tests such as antibiotic resistance. The presence of catalase in bacterial cells depends on both the growth condition and the medium used to grow the cells.

Capillary tubes may also be used. A small sample of bacteria is collected on the end of the capillary tube, without blocking the tube, to avoid false negative results. The opposite end is then dipped into hydrogen peroxide, which is drawn into the tube through capillary action, and turned upside down, so that the bacterial sample points downwards. The hand holding the tube is then tapped on the bench, moving the hydrogen peroxide down until it touches the bacteria. If bubbles form on contact, this indicates a positive catalase result. This test can detect catalase-positive bacteria at concentrations above about 10^{5} cells/mL, and is simple to use.

=== Bacterial virulence ===
Neutrophils and other phagocytes use peroxide to kill bacteria. The enzyme NADPH oxidase generates superoxide within the phagosome, which is converted via hydrogen peroxide to other oxidising substances like hypochlorous acid which kill phagocytosed pathogens. In individuals with chronic granulomatous disease (CGD), phagocytic peroxide production is impaired due to a defective NADPH oxidase system. Normal cellular metabolism will still produce a small amount of peroxide and this peroxide can be used to produce hypochlorous acid to eradicate the bacterial infection. However, if individuals with CGD are infected with catalase-positive bacteria, the bacterial catalase can destroy the excess peroxide before it can be used to produce other oxidising substances. In these individuals the pathogen survives and becomes a chronic infection. This chronic infection is typically surrounded by macrophages in an attempt to isolate the infection. This wall of macrophages surrounding a pathogen is called a granuloma. Many bacteria are catalase positive, but some are better catalase-producers than others. Some catalase-positive bacteria and fungi include: Nocardia, Pseudomonas, Listeria, Aspergillus, Candida, E. coli, Staphylococcus, Serratia, B. cepacia and H. pylori.

=== Acatalasia ===
Acatalasia is a condition caused by homozygous mutations in CAT, resulting in a lack of catalase. Symptoms are mild and include oral ulcers. A heterozygous CAT mutation results in lower, but still present catalase.

=== Gray hair ===
Low levels of catalase may play a role in the graying process of human hair. Hydrogen peroxide is naturally produced by the body and broken down by catalase. Hydrogen peroxide can accumulate in hair follicles and if catalase levels decline, this buildup can cause oxidative stress and graying. These low levels of catalase are associated with old age. Hydrogen peroxide interferes with the production of melanin, the pigment that gives hair its color.

== Interactions ==
Catalase has been shown to interact with the ABL2 and Abl genes. Infection with the murine leukemia virus causes catalase activity to decline in the lungs, heart and kidneys of mice. Conversely, dietary fish oil increased catalase activity in the heart, and kidneys of mice.

== Methods for determining catalase activity ==
In 1870, Schoenn discovered a formation of yellow color from the interaction of hydrogen peroxide with molybdate; then, from the middle of the 20th century, this reaction began to be used for colorimetric determination of unreacted hydrogen peroxide in the catalase activity assay. The reaction became widely used after publications by Korolyuk et al. (1988) and Goth (1991). The first paper describes serum catalase assay with no buffer in the reaction medium; the latter describes the procedure based on phosphate buffer as a reaction medium. Since phosphate ion reacts with ammonium molybdate, the use of MOPS buffer as a reaction medium is more appropriate.

Direct UV measurement of the decrease in the concentration of hydrogen peroxide is also widely used after the publications by Beers & Sizer and Aebi.

== See also ==
- Enzyme kinetics
- Glutathione peroxidase
- Peroxidase
- Superoxide dismutase
