= FLOT1 =

Protein-coding gene in the species Homo sapiens

Identifiers
- Aliases: FLOT1, flotillin 1
- External IDs: OMIM: 606998; MGI: 1100500; GeneCards: FLOT1

Gene location (Human)
Chr.	Chromosome 6 (human)
Band	6p21.33	Start	30,727,709 bp
Band	6p21.33	End	30,742,732 bp

Gene location (Mouse)
Chr.	Chromosome 17 (mouse)
Band	17|17 B1	Start	36,134,122 bp
Band	17|17 B1	End	36,143,683 bp
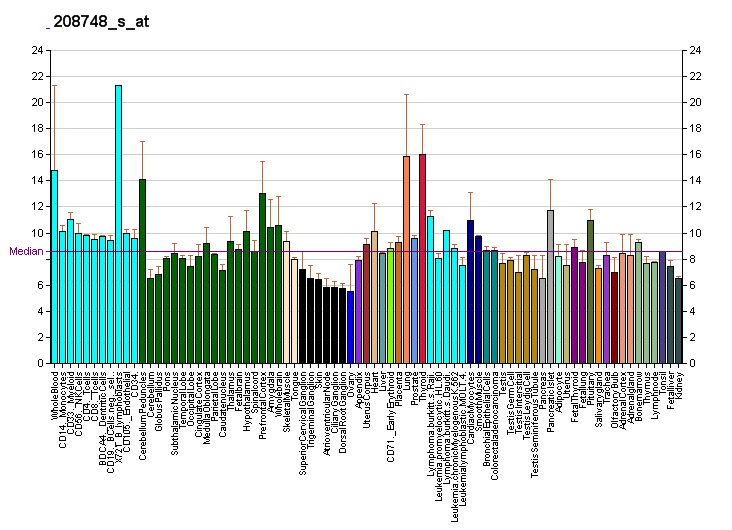

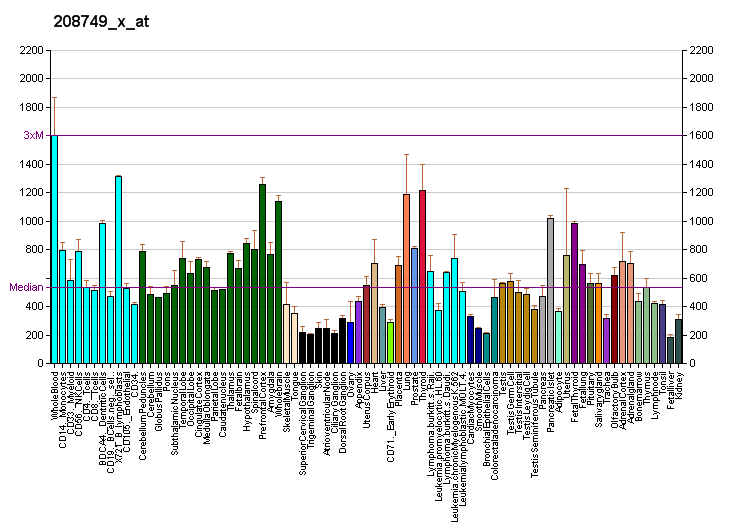

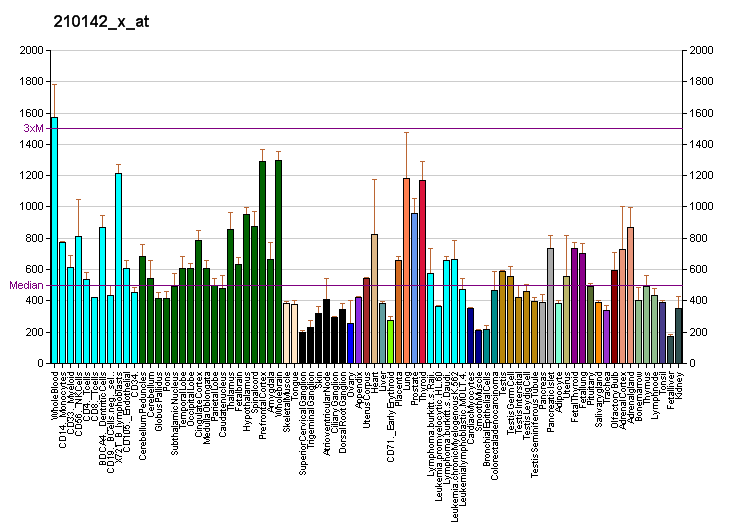
RNA expression pattern
Bgee	Human / Mouse (ortholog); Top expressed in: right adrenal gland; left adrenal gland; left adrenal cortex; right adrenal cortex; apex of heart; blood; C1 segment; dorsolateral prefrontal cortex; left ventricle; cerebellum / Top expressed in: granulocyte; interventricular septum; cardiac muscle tissue of left ventricle; right ventricle; dentate gyrus of hippocampal formation granule cell; ankle joint; sciatic nerve; facial motor nucleus; spinal ganglia; visual cortex; More reference expression data
BioGPS	More reference expression data
Gene ontology
Molecular function	protease binding; protein binding; protein heterodimerization activity; ionotropic glutamate receptor binding
Cellular component	integral component of membrane; endosome; membrane; cell-cell contact zone; focal adhesion; plasma membrane raft; melanosome; plasma membrane; centriolar satellite; microtubule organizing center; lysosomal membrane; flotillin complex; uropod; basolateral plasma membrane; early endosome; apical plasma membrane; cortical actin cytoskeleton; caveola; membrane raft; COP9 signalosome; sarcolemma; extracellular exosome; cytoplasmic vesicle; lamellipodium; cell-cell junction; external side of plasma membrane; synapse; presynaptic active zone; dopaminergic synapse; presynapse; glutamatergic synapse; GABA-ergic synapse
Biological process	positive regulation of cell-cell adhesion mediated by cadherin; positive regulation of cell adhesion molecule production; positive regulation of protein phosphorylation; regulation of toll-like receptor 4 signaling pathway; positive regulation of heterotypic cell-cell adhesion; positive regulation of toll-like receptor 3 signaling pathway; axonogenesis; positive regulation of skeletal muscle tissue development; positive regulation of cytokine production; extracellular matrix disassembly; protein kinase C signaling; response to endoplasmic reticulum stress; positive regulation of myoblast fusion; positive regulation of endocytosis; positive regulation of cell junction assembly; protein localization to membrane raft; membrane raft assembly; cellular response to exogenous dsRNA; regulation of receptor internalization; positive regulation of synaptic transmission, dopaminergic; positive regulation of protein binding; regulation of Rho protein signal transduction; protein homooligomerization; dsRNA transport; plasma membrane raft assembly; positive regulation of interferon-beta production; protein stabilization; protein localization to plasma membrane; regulation of neurotransmitter uptake; positive regulation of NF-kappaB transcription factor activity
Sources:Amigo / QuickGO
Orthologs
Databases	NCBI: entry; OMA: entry
Species	Human	Mouse
Entrez	10211	14251
Ensembl	ENSG00000137312; ENSG00000232280; ENSG00000224740; ENSG00000206480; ENSG00000206379 ENSG00000230143; ENSG00000236271; ENSG00000223654	ENSMUSG00000059714
UniProt	O75955	O08917
RefSeq (mRNA)	NM_005803; NM_001318875	NM_008027
RefSeq (protein)	NP_001305804; NP_005794	NP_032053
Location (UCSC)	Chr 6: 30.73 – 30.74 Mb	Chr 17: 36.13 – 36.14 Mb
PubMed search
- Wikidata
View/Edit Human	View/Edit Mouse

Flotillin-1 is a protein that in humans is encoded by the FLOT1 gene.

Caveolae are small domains on the inner cell membrane involved in vesicular trafficking and signal transduction. FLOT1 encodes a caveolae-associated, integral membrane protein. The function of flotillin 1 has not been determined.

== Interactions ==
FLOT1 has been shown to interact with SORBS1.
