= SORBS1 =

Protein-coding gene in the species Homo sapiens

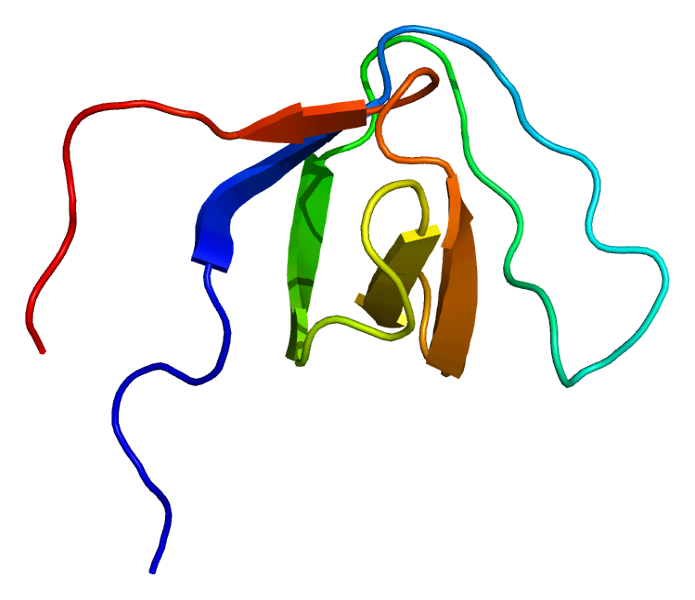

Identifiers
- Aliases: SORBS1, CAP, FLAF2, R85FL, SH3D5, SH3P12, SORB1, sorbin and SH3 domain containing 1
- External IDs: OMIM: 605264; MGI: 700014; GeneCards: SORBS1
Available structures
PDB	Ortholog search: PDBe RCSB
PDB	List of PDB id codes 2DL3, 2ECZ, 2LJ0, 2MOX, 2O2W, 2O31, 2O9S, 2O9V, 4LN2, 4LNP

Gene location (Human)
Chr.	Chromosome 10 (human)
Band	10q24.1	Start	95,311,771 bp
Band	10q24.1	End	95,561,414 bp

Gene location (Mouse)
Chr.	Chromosome 19 (mouse)
Band	19 C3|19 34.25 cM	Start	40,294,753 bp
Band	19 C3|19 34.25 cM	End	40,513,779 bp
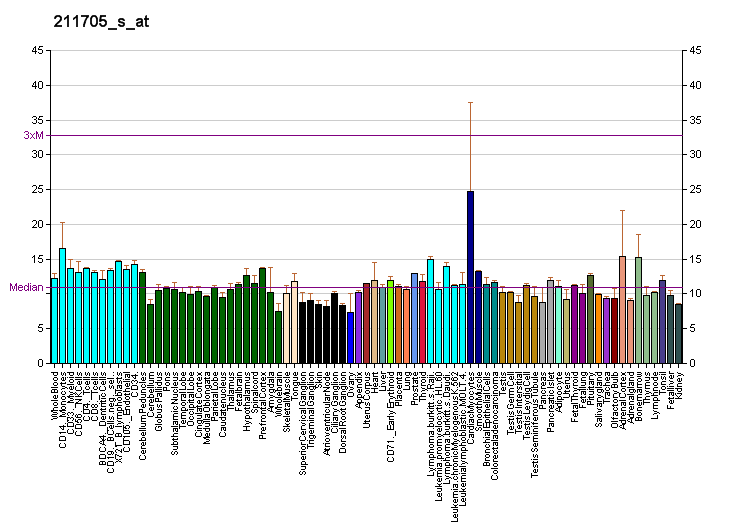

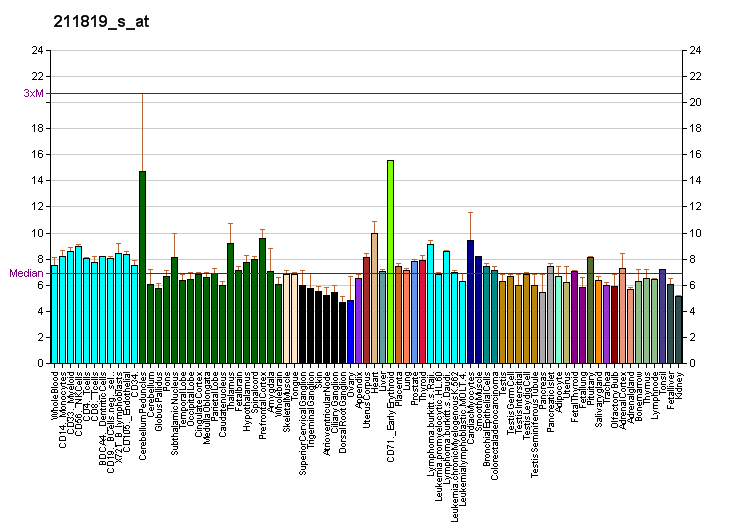

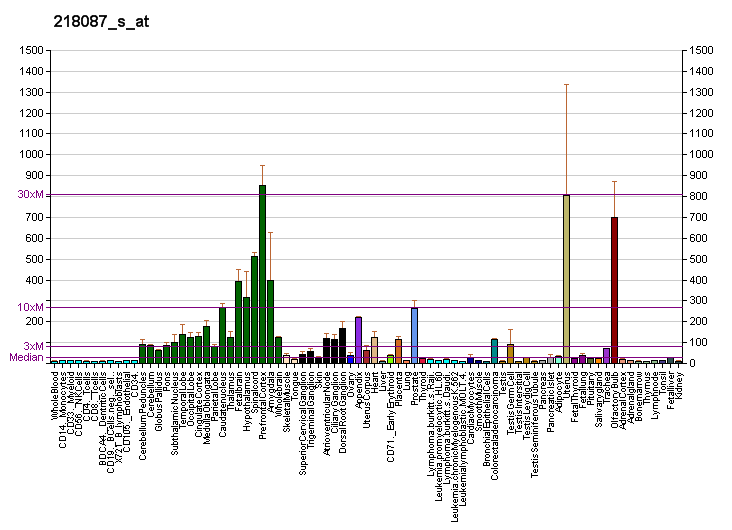
RNA expression pattern
Bgee	Human / Mouse (ortholog); Top expressed in: saphenous vein; myocardium of left ventricle; tail of epididymis; cardiac muscle tissue of right atrium; Descending thoracic aorta; gastric mucosa; popliteal artery; tibial arteries; right coronary artery; right ventricle / Top expressed in: Rostral migratory stream; tunica adventitia of aorta; subcutaneous adipose tissue; white adipose tissue; intercostal muscle; brown adipose tissue; myocardium of ventricle; paraventricular nucleus of hypothalamus; globus pallidus; tunica media of zone of aorta; More reference expression data
BioGPS	More reference expression data
Gene ontology
Molecular function	insulin receptor binding; cytoskeletal protein binding; protein binding; actin binding
Cellular component	cytosol; centrosome; membrane; focal adhesion; nuclear matrix; adherens junction; plasma membrane; stress fiber; cell junction; zonula adherens; membrane raft; cytoskeleton; nucleus; insulin receptor complex; cytoplasm
Biological process	positive regulation of glucose import; positive regulation of glycogen biosynthetic process; muscle contraction; positive regulation of lipid biosynthetic process; actin filament organization; stress fiber assembly; focal adhesion assembly; cellular response to insulin stimulus; cell-matrix adhesion; positive regulation of signal transduction; positive regulation of protein localization to plasma membrane; insulin receptor signaling pathway; positive regulation of insulin receptor signaling pathway
Sources:Amigo / QuickGO
Orthologs
Databases	NCBI: entry; OMA: entry
Species	Human	Mouse
Entrez	10580	20411
Ensembl	ENSG00000095637	ENSMUSG00000025006
UniProt	Q9BX66	Q62417
RefSeq (mRNA)	NM_001034954; NM_001034955; NM_001034956; NM_001034957; NM_001290294 NM_001290295; NM_001290296; NM_001290297; NM_001290298; NM_006434; NM_015385; NM_024991; NM_001377197; NM_001377198; NM_001377199; NM_001377200; NM_001377201; NM_001377202; NM_001377203; NM_001377204; NM_001377205; NM_001377206; NM_001377207; NM_001377208; NM_001377209; NM_001384447; NM_001384448; NM_001384449; NM_001384450; NM_001384451; NM_001384452; NM_001384453; NM_001384454; NM_001384455; NM_001384456; NM_001384457; NM_001384458; NM_001384459; NM_001384460; NM_001384461; NM_001384462; NM_001384463; NM_001384464; NM_001384465	NM_001034962; NM_001034963; NM_001034964; NM_009166; NM_178362
RefSeq (protein)	NP_001030126; NP_001030127; NP_001030128; NP_001030129; NP_001277223 NP_001277224; NP_001277225; NP_001277226; NP_001277227; NP_006425; NP_056200; NP_079267; NP_001364126; NP_001364127; NP_001364128; NP_001364129; NP_001364130; NP_001364131; NP_001364132; NP_001364133; NP_001364134; NP_001364135; NP_001364136; NP_001364137; NP_001364138	NP_001030134; NP_001030135; NP_001030136; NP_033192; NP_848139 NP_001389984; NP_001389985
Location (UCSC)	Chr 10: 95.31 – 95.56 Mb	Chr 19: 40.29 – 40.51 Mb
PubMed search
- Wikidata
View/Edit Human	View/Edit Mouse

CAP/Ponsin protein, also known as Sorbin and SH3 domain-containing protein 1, is a protein that in humans is encoded by the SORBS1 gene. It is part of a small family of adaptor proteins that regulate cell adhesion, growth factor signaling and cytoskeletal formation. It is mainly expressed in heart, skeletal muscle, liver, adipose tissue, and macrophages; in striated muscle tissue, it is localized to costamere structures.

== Structure ==
CAP/Ponsin may exist as thirteen alternatively-spliced isoforms, ranging from 81 kDa to 142 kDa. It is part of an adaptor protein family, of which ArgBP2 and vinexin are also a part. These proteins contain a conserved sorbin homology (SOHO) domain and three SH3 domains, and CAP/Ponsin is expressed in heart, skeletal muscle, liver, adipose tissue, and macrophages.

== Function ==
In muscle, CAP/Ponsin plays a role in the formation of mature costameres from focal adhesion-like contacts during assembly of the contractile apparatus, as overexpression of CAP/Ponsin disrupted normal cell-matrix contact morphology. In a mouse model of viral myocarditis due to Coxsackievirus infection, CAP/Ponsin stabilized antiviral type I interferon production and was protective against apoptosis and cytotoxicity. It has also been shown to be a major regulator of insulin-stimulated signaling and regulation of glucose uptake, by potentiating insulin-induced phosphorylation and recruitment of CBL to a lipid raft signaling complex involving flotillin. A role for it in macrophage function was illuminated by the finding that, in mice harboring SORBS1-deficient macrophages in bone marrow, it was protective against high-fat diet-induced insulin resistance and showed reduced inflammation. In non-muscle cells, it inhibits cell spreading and focal adhesion turnover, as its siRNA-mediated knockdown resulted in enhanced PAK/MEK/ERK activation and cell migration.

== Clinical Significance ==
CAP/Ponsin was demonstrated to be down-regulated in end-stage heart failure patients; an effect that was restored upon mechanical unloading. A single nucleotide polymorphism in SORBS1 was found to be associated with type 2 diabetes and obesity.

== Interactions ==
SORBS1 has been shown to interact with:

- CBL,
- FLOT1,
- INPPL1,
- INSM1,
- MLLT4,
- PXN, and
- Vinculin.
