= CBLB (gene) =

Protein-coding gene in humans

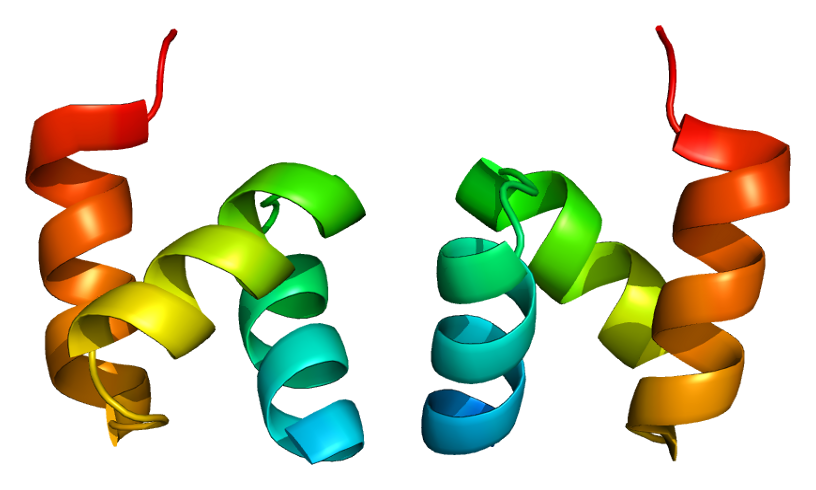

Identifiers
- Aliases: CBLB, Cbl-b, RNF56, Nbla00127, Cbl proto-oncogene B
- External IDs: OMIM: 604491; MGI: 2146430; GeneCards: CBLB
Available structures
PDB	Ortholog search: PDBe RCSB
PDB	List of PDB id codes 2AK5, 2BZ8, 2DO6, 2J6F, 2JNH, 2LDR, 2OOA, 2OOB, 3PFV, 3VGO, 3ZNI
Enzyme activity
EC #	BRENDA	ExPASy	KEGG	MetaCyc
2.3.2.27	↗	↗	↗	↗

Gene location (Human)
Chr.	Chromosome 3 (human)
Band	3q13.11	Start	105,655,461 bp
Band	3q13.11	End	105,869,552 bp

Gene location (Mouse)
Chr.	Chromosome 16 (mouse)
Band	16|16 B5	Start	51,851,588 bp
Band	16|16 B5	End	52,028,411 bp
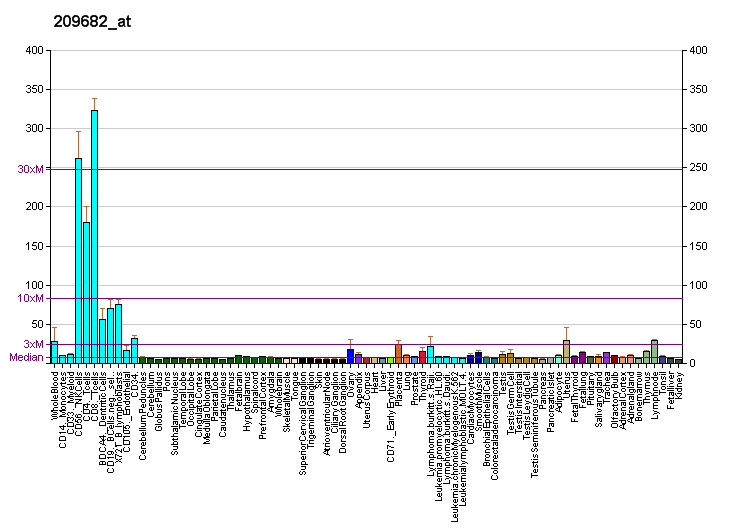
RNA expression pattern
Bgee	Human / Mouse (ortholog); Top expressed in: pericardium; epithelium of colon; Achilles tendon; tail of epididymis; saphenous vein; gastric mucosa; tibia; decidua; tibial nerve; visceral pleura / Top expressed in: hand; genital tubercle; tail of embryo; umbilical cord; cumulus cell; renal corpuscle; lymph node; blood; left lung lobe; mesenteric lymph nodes; More reference expression data
BioGPS	More reference expression data
Gene ontology
Molecular function	calcium ion binding; phosphotyrosine residue binding; metal ion binding; protein binding; ubiquitin-protein transferase activity; transferase activity; SH3 domain binding; receptor tyrosine kinase binding; ubiquitin protein ligase activity; zinc ion binding
Cellular component	nucleoplasm; cytoplasm; cytosol; plasma membrane; membrane raft; nucleus
Biological process	regulation of signaling; cell surface receptor signaling pathway; protein ubiquitination; NLS-bearing protein import into nucleus; signal transduction; proteolysis; epidermal growth factor receptor signaling pathway; negative regulation of epidermal growth factor-activated receptor activity; regulation of platelet-derived growth factor receptor-alpha signaling pathway
Sources:Amigo / QuickGO
Orthologs
Databases	NCBI: entry; OMA: entry
Species	Human	Mouse
Entrez	868	208650
Ensembl	ENSG00000114423	ENSMUSG00000022637
UniProt	Q13191	Q3TTA7
RefSeq (mRNA)	NM_170662; NM_001321786; NM_001321788; NM_001321789; NM_001321790 NM_001321791; NM_001321793; NM_001321794; NM_001321795; NM_001321796; NM_001321797; NM_001321798; NM_001321799; NM_001321806; NM_001321807; NM_001321808; NM_001321811; NM_001321813; NM_001321816; NM_001321820; NM_001321822; NM_004351	NM_001033238
RefSeq (protein)	NP_001308715; NP_001308717; NP_001308718; NP_001308719; NP_001308720 NP_001308722; NP_001308723; NP_001308724; NP_001308725; NP_001308726; NP_001308727; NP_001308728; NP_001308735; NP_001308736; NP_001308737; NP_001308740; NP_001308742; NP_001308745; NP_001308749; NP_001308751; NP_733762	NP_001028410
Location (UCSC)	Chr 3: 105.66 – 105.87 Mb	Chr 16: 51.85 – 52.03 Mb
PubMed search
- Wikidata
View/Edit Human	View/Edit Mouse

CBL-B is an E3 ubiquitin-protein ligase that in humans is encoded by the CBLB gene. CBLB is a member of the CBL gene family.

== Function ==
CBL-B functions as a negative regulator of T-cell activation. CBL-B expression in T cells causes ligand-induced T cell receptor down-modulation, controlling the activation degree of T cells during antigen presentation.

== Clinical significance ==
Mutation of the CBLB gene has been associated with autoimmune conditions such as type 1 diabetes.

== Interactions ==
CBLB has been shown to interact with:

- CRKL,
- Epidermal growth factor receptor,
- Grb2,
- NEDD4,
- PIK3R1, and
- SH3KBP1.
