= Tyrosin-protein kinase Lck =

Lymphocyte protein

LCK
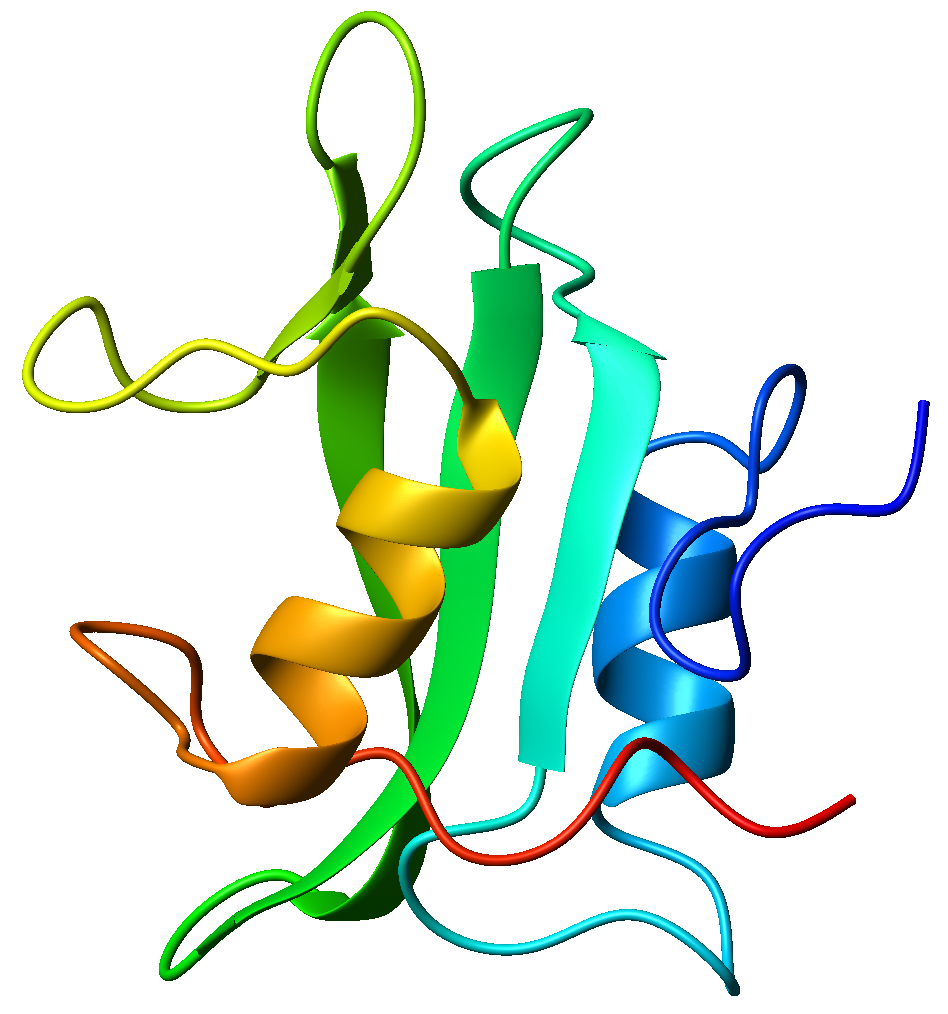

Identifiers
- Aliases: LCK, LCK proto-oncogene, Src family tyrosine kinase, IMD22, LSK, YT16, p56lck, pp58lck
- External IDs: OMIM: 153390; MGI: 96756; GeneCards: LCK
Available structures
PDB	Ortholog search: E9PI33 PDBe E9PI33 RCSB
PDB	List of PDB id codes 1BHF, 1BHH, 1CWD, 1CWE, 1FBZ, 1H92, 1IJR, 1KIK, 1LCJ, 1LCK, 1LKK, 1LKL, 1Q68, 1Q69, 1QPC, 1QPD, 1QPE, 1QPJ, 1X27, 2IIM, 2OF2, 2OF4, 2OFU, 2OFV, 2OG8, 2PL0, 2ZM1, 2ZM4, 2ZYB, 3AC1, 3AC2, 3AC3, 3AC4, 3AC5, 3AC8, 3ACJ, 3ACK, 3AD4, 3AD5, 3AD6, 3B2W, 3BRH, 3BYM, 3BYO, 3BYS, 3BYU, 3KMM, 3KXZ, 3LCK, 3MPM, 4D8K, 4C3F
Enzyme activity
EC #	BRENDA	ExPASy	KEGG	MetaCyc
2.7.10.2	↗	↗	↗	↗

Gene location (Human)
Chr.	Chromosome 1 (human)
Band	1p35.2	Start	32,251,239 bp
Band	1p35.2	End	32,286,165 bp

Gene location (Mouse)
Chr.	Chromosome 4 (mouse)
Band	4 D2.2|4 63.26 cM	Start	129,442,137 bp
Band	4 D2.2|4 63.26 cM	End	129,467,434 bp
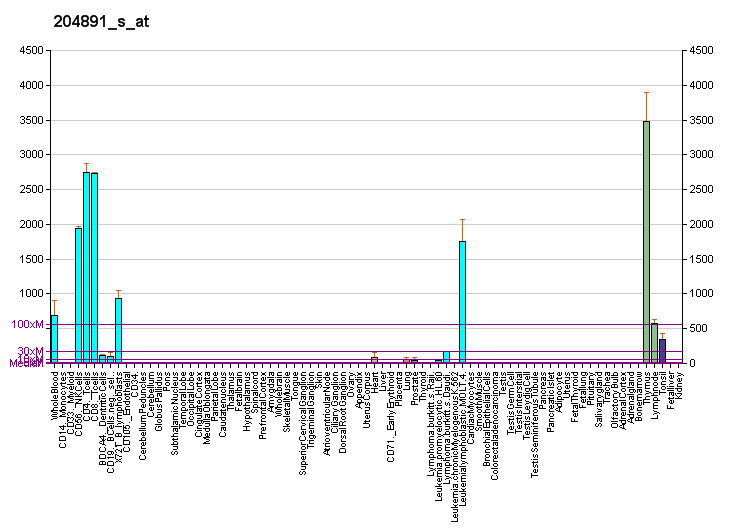

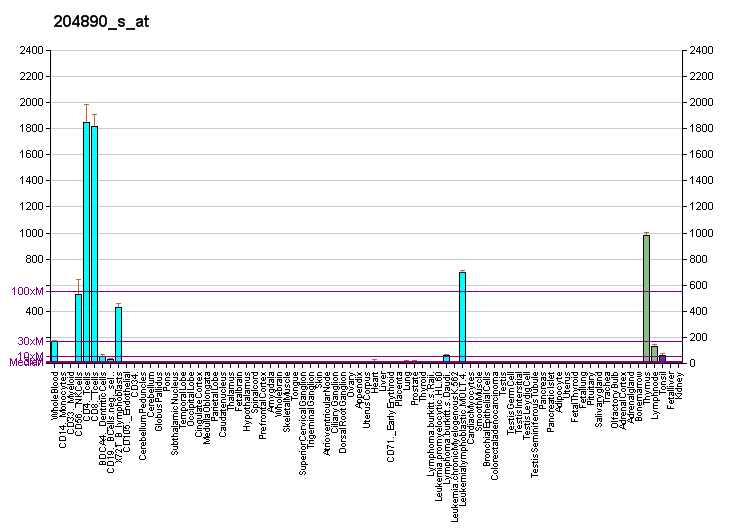
RNA expression pattern
Bgee	Human / Mouse (ortholog); Top expressed in: thymus; granulocyte; lymph node; blood; appendix; spleen; epithelium of nasopharynx; mucosa of ileum; superficial temporal artery; tonsil / Top expressed in: thymus; mesenteric lymph nodes; spleen; blood; otic placode; submandibular gland; otic vesicle; subcutaneous adipose tissue; ankle joint; epiblast; More reference expression data
BioGPS	More reference expression data
Gene ontology
Molecular function	transferase activity; nucleotide binding; protein kinase activity; CD4 receptor binding; ATPase binding; SH2 domain binding; CD8 receptor binding; phosphatidylinositol 3-kinase binding; protein C-terminus binding; protein binding; identical protein binding; protein phosphatase binding; ATP binding; protein kinase binding; phosphatidylinositol-4,5-bisphosphate 3-kinase activity; kinase activity; protein serine/threonine phosphatase activity; non-membrane spanning protein tyrosine kinase activity; phosphotyrosine residue binding; protein tyrosine kinase activity; T cell receptor binding; signaling receptor binding
Cellular component	cytoplasm; cytosol; membrane; extrinsic component of cytoplasmic side of plasma membrane; immunological synapse; extracellular exosome; pericentriolar material; membrane raft; plasma membrane
Biological process	B cell receptor signaling pathway; release of sequestered calcium ion into cytosol; hemopoiesis; phosphorylation; transmembrane receptor protein tyrosine kinase signaling pathway; positive regulation of T cell receptor signaling pathway; T cell costimulation; mitigation of host defenses by virus; platelet activation; T cell differentiation; regulation of cell population proliferation; cellular zinc ion homeostasis; regulation of lymphocyte activation; peptidyl-tyrosine autophosphorylation; T cell receptor signaling pathway; positive regulation of intrinsic apoptotic signaling pathway; leukocyte migration; positive regulation of T cell activation; protein dephosphorylation; innate immune response; phosphatidylinositol phosphate biosynthetic process; viral process; protein phosphorylation; activation of cysteine-type endopeptidase activity involved in apoptotic process; cell migration; peptidyl-tyrosine phosphorylation; interleukin-7-mediated signaling pathway; positive regulation of protein kinase B signaling; cell differentiation; positive regulation of heterotypic cell-cell adhesion; positive regulation of leukocyte cell-cell adhesion
Sources:Amigo / QuickGO
Orthologs
Databases	NCBI: entry; OMA: entry
Species	Human	Mouse
Entrez	3932	16818
Ensembl	ENSG00000182866	ENSMUSG00000000409
UniProt	P06239	P06240
RefSeq (mRNA)	NM_001042771; NM_005356; NM_001330468	NM_001162432; NM_001162433; NM_010693
RefSeq (protein)	NP_001036236; NP_001317397; NP_005347	NP_001155904; NP_001155905; NP_034823
Location (UCSC)	Chr 1: 32.25 – 32.29 Mb	Chr 4: 129.44 – 129.47 Mb
PubMed search
- Wikidata
View/Edit Human	View/Edit Mouse

Tyrosin-protein kinase Lck (or lymphocyte-specific protein tyrosine kinase) is a 56 kDa protein that is found inside lymphocytes and encoded in the human by the LCK gene. The Lck is a member of Src kinase family (SKF) and is important for the activation of T-cell receptor (TCR) signaling in both naive T cells and effector T cells. The role of Lck is less prominent in the activation or in the maintenance of memory CD8 T cells in comparison to CD4 T cells. In addition, the constitutive activity of the mouse Lck homolog varies among memory T cell subsets. It seems that in mice, in the effector memory T cell (TEM) population, more than 50% of Lck is present in a constitutively active conformation, whereas less than 20% of Lck is present as active form in central memory T cells. These differences are due to differential regulation by SH2 domain–containing phosphatase-1 (Shp-1) and C-terminal Src kinase.

Lck is responsible for the initiation of the TCR signaling cascade inside the cell by phosphorylating immunoreceptor tyrosine-based activation motifs (ITAM) within the TCR-associated chains.

Lck can be found in different forms in immune cells: free in the cytosol or bound to the plasma membrane (PM) through myristoylation and palmitoylation. Due to the presence of the conserved CxxC motif (C20 and C23) in the zinc clasp structure, Lck is able to bind the cell surface coreceptors CD8 and\or CD4.

Bound and free Lck have different properties: free Lck has more pronounced kinase activity in comparison to bound Lck, and moreover, the free form produces a higher level of T cell activation. The reasons for these differences are not well understood yet.

== T cell signaling ==
Lck is most commonly found in T cells. It associates with the cytoplasmic tails of the CD4 and CD8 co-receptors on T helper cells and cytotoxic T cells, respectively, to assist signaling from the T cell receptor (TCR) complex. T cells are able to respond to pathogen and cancer using T-cell receptor, nevertheless, they can also react to self-antigen causing the onset of autoimmune diseases. The T cells maturation occurs in the thymus and it is regulated by a threshold that defines the limit between the positive and the negative selection of thymocytes. In order to avoid the onset of autoimmune diseases, highly self-reactive T cells are removed during the negative selection, whereas, an amount of weak self-reactive T cells is required to promote an efficient immune response, therefore during the positive selection these cells are chosen for maturation. The threshold for positive and negative selection of developing T cells is regulated by the bound between the Lck and co-receptors.

There are two main pools of T cells which mediate adaptive immune responses: CD4+ T cells (or helper T cells), and CD8+ T-cells (or cytotoxic T cells) which are MHCII-and MHCI restricted respectively. Despite their role in the immune system is different their activation is similar. Cytotoxic T cells are directly involved in the individuation and in the removal of infected cells, whereas helper T cells modulate other immune cells to supply the response.

The initiation of immune response takes place when T cells encounter and recognize their cognate antigen. The antigen-presenting cells (APC) expose on their surface a fraction of the antigen that is recognized either from CD8+ T cells or CD4+ T cells. This binding leads to the activation of TCR signaling cascade in which the immunoreceptor tyrosine-based activation motifs (ITAM) located in the CD3-zeta chains (ζ-chains) of the TCR complex, are phosphorylated by Lck and less extended by Fyn. Both coreceptor-bound and free Lck can phosphorylate the CD3 chains upon TCR activation, evidences suggest that the free form of Lck can be recruited and trigger the TCR signal faster than the coreceptor-bound Lck Additionally, upon T cell activation, a fraction of kinase active Lck, translocate from outside of lipid rafts (LR) to inside lipid rafts where it interacts with and activates LR-resident Fyn, which is involved in further downstream signaling activation. Once ITAM complex is phosphorylated the CD3 chains can be bound by another cytoplasmic tyrosine kinase called ZAP-70. In the case of CD8+ T cells, once ZAP70 binds CD3, the coreceptor associated with Lck binds the MHC stabilizing the TCR-MHC-peptide interaction. The phosphorylated form of ZAP-70 recruits another molecule in the signaling cascade called LAT (Linker for activation of T cells), a transmembrane protein. LAT acts as a scaffold able to regulate the TCR proximal signals in a phosphorylation-dependent manner. The most important proteins recruited by phosphorylated LAT are Shc-Grb2-SOS, PI3K, and phospholipase C (PLC). The residue responsible for the recruitment of phospholipase C-γ1 (PLC-γ1) is Y132. This binding leads to the Tec family kinase ITK-mediated PLC-γ1 phosphorylation and activation that consequentially produce calcium (Ca^{2+}) ions mobilization, and activation of important signaling cascades within the lymphocyte. These include the Ras-MEK-ERK pathway, which goes on to activate certain transcription factors such as NFAT, NF-κB, and AP-1. These transcription factors regulate the production of a plethora of gene products, most notable, cytokines such as Interleukin-2 that promote long-term proliferation and differentiation of the activated lymphocytes. In addition to the significance of Lck and Fyn in T cell receptor signaling, these two src kinases have also been shown to be important in TLR-mediated signaling in T cells.

The function of Lck has been studied using several biochemical methods, including gene knockout (knock-out mice), Jurkat cells deficient in Lck (JCaM1.6), and siRNA-mediated RNA interference.

== Lck activity regulation ==
The activity of the Lck can be positively or negatively regulated by the presence of other proteins such as the membrane protein CD146, the transmembrane tyrosine phosphatase CD45 and C-terminal Src kinase (Csk). In mice, CD146 directly interacts with the SH3 domain of coreceptor-free LCK via its cytoplasmic domain, promoting the LCK autophosphorylation. There is very little understanding of the role of CD45 isoforms, it is known that they are cell type-specific, and that they depend on the state of activation and differentiation of cells. In naïve T cells in humans, CD45RA isoform is more frequent, whereas when cells are activated the CD45R0 isoform is expressed in higher concentrations. Mice express low levels of high molecular weight isoforms (CD45RABC) in thymocytes or peripheral T cells. Low levels of CD45RB are typical in primed cells, while high levels of CD45RB are found in both naïve and primed cells. In general, CD45 acts to promote the active form of LCK by dephosphorylating a tyrosine (Y192) in its inhibitory C-terminal tail. The consequent trans-autophosphorylation of the tyrosine in the lck activation loop (Y394), stabilizes its active form promoting its open conformation which further enhances the kinase activity and substrate binding. The Dephosphorylation of the Y394 site can also be regulated by SH2 domain-containing phosphatase 1 (SHP-1), PEST-domain enriched tyrosine phosphatase (PEP), and protein tyrosine phosphatase-PEST. In contrast, Csk has an opposite role to that of CD45, it phosphorylated the Y505 of Lck promoting the closed conformation with inhibited kinase activity. When both Y394 and Y505 are unphosphorylated the lck show a basal kinase activity, vice versa, when phosphorylated, lck show similar activity to the Y394 single phosphorylated Lck

== Structure ==
Lck is a 56-kilodalton protein. The N-terminal tail of Lck is myristoylated and palmitoylated, which tethers the protein to the plasma membrane of the cell. The protein furthermore contains a SH3 domain, a SH2 domain and in the C-terminal part the tyrosine kinase domain. The two main phosphorylation sites on Lck are tyrosines 394 and 505. The former is an autophosphorylation site and is linked to activation of the protein. The latter is phosphorylated by Csk, which inhibits Lck because the protein folds up and binds its own SH2 domain. Lck thus serves as an instructive example that protein phosphorylation may result in both activation and inhibition.

== Lck and disease ==
Mutations in Lck are liked to a various range of diseases such as SCID (Severe combined immunodeficiency) or CIDs. In these pathologies, the dysfunctional activation of the lck leads to T cell activation failure. Many pathologies are linked to the overexpression of Lck such as cancer, asthma, diabetes 1, rheumatoid arthritis, psoriasis, systemic lupus erythematosus, inflammatory bowel diseases (Crohn's disease and ulcerative colitis), organ graft rejection, atherosclerosis, hypersensitivity reactions, polyarthritis, dermatomyositis. The increase of the lck in colonic epithelial cells can lead to colorectal cancer. The lck play a role also in the Thymoma, an auto-immune disorder which involve thymus. Tumorigenesis is enhanced by abnormal proliferation of immature thymocytes due to low levels of Lck.

Lymphoid protein tyrosine phosphatase (lyp), is one of the suppressor of lck activity and mutations in this protein are correlated with the onset of diabetes 1. Increased activity of lck promote the onset of the diabetes 1.

Regarding respiratory diseases, asthma is associated with the activation of th2 type of t cell whose differentiation is mediated by lck. Moreover, mice with an unbalanced amount of lck show altered lung function which can consequentially leads to the onset of asthma.

== Substrates ==
Lck tyrosine phosphorylates a number of proteins, the most important of which are the CD3 receptor, CEACAM1, ZAP-70, SLP-76, the IL-2 receptor, Protein kinase C, ITK, PLC, SHC, RasGAP, Cbl, Vav1, and PI3K.

== Inhibition ==
In resting T cells, Lck is constitutively inhibited by Csk phosphorylation on tyrosine 505. Lck is also inhibited by SHP-1 dephosphorylation on tyrosine 394. Lck can also be inhibited by Cbl ubiquitin ligase, which is part of the ubiquitin-mediated pathway.

Saractinib, a specific inhibitor of LCK impairs maintenance of human T-ALL cells in vitro as well as in vivo by targeting this tyrosine kinase in cells displaying high level of lipid rafts.

Masitinib also inhibits Lck, which may have some impact on its therapeutic effects in canine mastocytoma.

HSP90 inhibitor NVP-BEP800 has been described to affect stability of the LCK kinase and growth of T-cell acute lymphoblastic leukemias.

== Interactions ==
Lck has been shown to interact with:

- ADAM15,
- CD2,
- CD44,
- CD4,
- COUP-TFII,
- DLG1,
- NOTCH1,
- PIK3CA,
- PTPN6,
- PTPRC,
- UNC119,
- SYK,
- UBE3A, and
- ZAP70.

== See also ==
- Tyrosine kinase
- T cell
