= CD8.4 =

Receptor on the surface of a eukaryotic cell

CD8.4 is a murine chimeric coreceptor. The extracellular and transmembrane part of the coreceptor is from wild-type CD8 coreceptor, whereas the intracellular domain from CD4 coreceptor. This model was created to examine role of coreceptor coupling to Lck (lymphocyte-specific protein tyrosine kinase) as the CD4 and CD8 coreceptors have an Lck-binding site in their intracellular domain. CD4 coreceptor has higher coupling to Lck in thymocytes than CD8 coreceptor. CD8.4 coreceptor has similar coupling to Lck as CD4 coreceptor, while the MHC I-binding site remains identical to wild-type CD8. This chimeric coreceptor therefore enables addressing influence of different coupling to Lck on TCR signaling.
