= SHB =

SHB may refer to:

- SHB (gene)
- Shabab El-Bourj SC, a Lebanese association football club
- Nakashibetsu Airport, Japan, IATA code
- Shook, Hardy & Bacon, an American law firm
- Shepherd's Bush tube station, London, UK, station code
- Svenska Handelsbanken, a bank
- Final Fantasy XIV: Shadowbringers, an expansion to the popular MMO game Final Fantasy XIV, commonly referred to as ShB to disambiguate it from the previous expansion, Stormblood

== See also ==
- SHB Đà Nẵng F.C., a Vietnamese association football club
