= GRB2-associated-binding protein 1 =

Protein-coding gene in the species Homo sapiens

GAB1

Identifiers
- Aliases: GAB1, GRB2 associated binding protein 1, DFNB26
- External IDs: OMIM: 604439; MGI: 108088; GeneCards: GAB1
Available structures
PDB	Ortholog search: PDBe RCSB
PDB	List of PDB id codes 4QSY

Gene location (Human)
Chr.	Chromosome 4 (human)
Band	4q31.21	Start	143,336,762 bp
Band	4q31.21	End	143,474,568 bp

Gene location (Mouse)
Chr.	Chromosome 8 (mouse)
Band	8|8 C2	Start	81,491,067 bp
Band	8|8 C2	End	81,607,148 bp
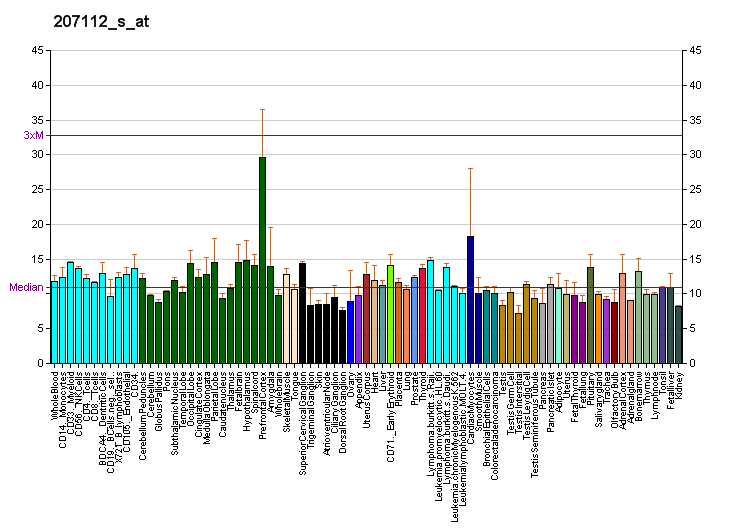
RNA expression pattern
Bgee	Human / Mouse (ortholog); Top expressed in: secondary oocyte; epithelium of colon; endothelial cell; corpus callosum; ventricular zone; trigeminal ganglion; sural nerve; inferior ganglion of vagus nerve; spinal ganglia; internal globus pallidus / Top expressed in: vestibular membrane of cochlear duct; sciatic nerve; vestibular sensory epithelium; genital tubercle; fossa; condyle; efferent ductule; external carotid artery; substantia nigra; atrioventricular junction; More reference expression data
BioGPS	More reference expression data
Gene ontology
Molecular function	protein binding; 1-phosphatidylinositol-3-kinase activity; phosphatidylinositol-4,5-bisphosphate 3-kinase activity
Cellular component	cytosol
Biological process	insulin receptor signaling pathway; cell population proliferation; phosphatidylinositol phosphate biosynthetic process; phosphatidylinositol-3-phosphate biosynthetic process; ERBB2 signaling pathway; axon guidance; epidermal growth factor receptor signaling pathway; angiogenesis; actin cytoskeleton reorganization; vascular endothelial growth factor signaling pathway; positive regulation of cell migration by vascular endothelial growth factor signaling pathway; positive regulation of angiogenesis; positive regulation of protein kinase B signaling; endothelial cell chemotaxis to vascular endothelial growth factor; response to hepatocyte growth factor; positive regulation of phosphatidylinositol 3-kinase signaling
Sources:Amigo / QuickGO
Orthologs
Databases	NCBI: entry; OMA: entry
Species	Human	Mouse
Entrez	2549	14388
Ensembl	ENSG00000109458	ENSMUSG00000031714
UniProt	Q13480	Q9QYY0
RefSeq (mRNA)	NM_002039; NM_207123	NM_001301298; NM_021356
RefSeq (protein)	NP_002030; NP_997006	NP_001288227; NP_067331
Location (UCSC)	Chr 4: 143.34 – 143.47 Mb	Chr 8: 81.49 – 81.61 Mb
PubMed search
- Wikidata
View/Edit Human	View/Edit Mouse

GRB2-associated-binding protein 1 is a protein that in humans is encoded by the GAB1 gene.

== Function ==
The protein encoded by this gene is a member of the IRS1-like multisubstrate docking protein family. The encoded protein is an important mediator of branching tubulogenesis and plays a central role in cellular growth response, transformation and apoptosis. Two transcript variants encoding different isoforms have been found for this gene. GAB1 is involved also in the tonic pAKT activity in malignant B cells, and induces PI3K activation irrespectively of BCR stimulation by antigen in chronic lymphocytic leukemia.

== Interactions ==
GAB1 has been shown to interact with:

- CRKL,
- Grb2,
- MAP3K3,
- PIK3R1,
- PLCG1 and
- PTPN11.
