= CISH (protein) =

Protein-coding gene in the species Homo sapiens

Identifiers
- Aliases: CISH, BACTS2, CIS, CIS-1, G18, SOCS, cytokine inducible SH2 containing protein
- External IDs: OMIM: 602441; MGI: 103159; GeneCards: CISH

Gene location (Human)
Chr.	Chromosome 3 (human)
Band	3p21.2	Start	50,606,489 bp
Band	3p21.2	End	50,611,774 bp

Gene location (Mouse)
Chr.	Chromosome 9 (mouse)
Band	9 F1|9 57.99 cM	Start	107,173,225 bp
Band	9 F1|9 57.99 cM	End	107,179,983 bp
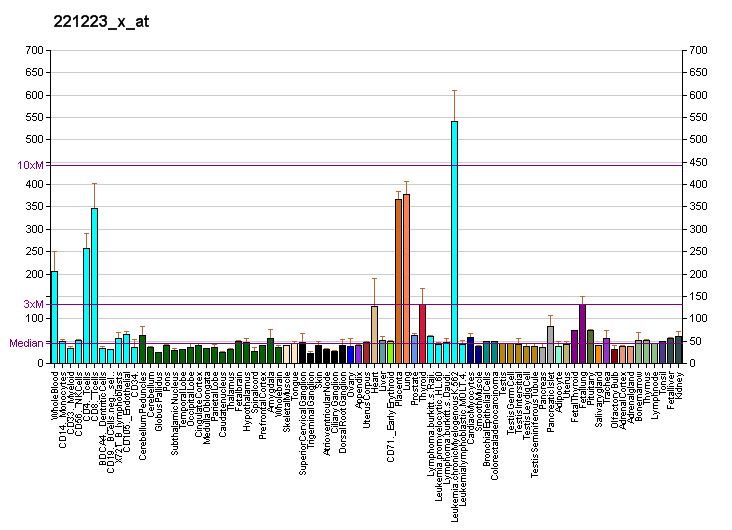
RNA expression pattern
Bgee	Human / Mouse (ortholog); Top expressed in: granulocyte; left lobe of thyroid gland; right lobe of thyroid gland; human kidney; tibialis anterior muscle; right lobe of liver; upper lobe of left lung; blood; placenta; apex of heart / Top expressed in: interventricular septum; triceps brachii muscle; sternocleidomastoid muscle; temporal muscle; myocardium of ventricle; digastric muscle; cardiac muscles; choroid plexus of fourth ventricle; right ventricle; right kidney; More reference expression data
BioGPS	More reference expression data
Gene ontology
Molecular function	protein kinase inhibitor activity; protein binding; molecular function; 1-phosphatidylinositol-3-kinase regulator activity
Cellular component	cytoplasm; cytosol; plasma membrane; cellular component; phosphatidylinositol 3-kinase complex
Biological process	regulation of growth; negative regulation of insulin receptor signaling pathway; protein kinase C-activating G protein-coupled receptor signaling pathway; intracellular signal transduction; negative regulation of signal transduction; regulation of cell growth; protein ubiquitination; negative regulation of protein kinase activity; negative regulation of receptor signaling pathway via JAK-STAT; cytokine-mediated signaling pathway; post-translational protein modification; interleukin-7-mediated signaling pathway; regulation of phosphatidylinositol 3-kinase activity; phosphatidylinositol phosphate biosynthetic process
Sources:Amigo / QuickGO
Orthologs
Databases	NCBI: entry; OMA: entry
Species	Human	Mouse
Entrez	1154	12700
Ensembl	ENSG00000114737	ENSMUSG00000032578
UniProt	Q9NSE2	Q62225
RefSeq (mRNA)	NM_013324; NM_145071	NM_009895; NM_001317354
RefSeq (protein)	NP_037456; NP_659508	NP_001304283; NP_034025
Location (UCSC)	Chr 3: 50.61 – 50.61 Mb	Chr 9: 107.17 – 107.18 Mb
PubMed search
- Wikidata
View/Edit Human	View/Edit Mouse

Cytokine-inducible SH2-containing protein is a protein that in humans is encoded by the CISH gene. CISH orthologs have been identified in most mammals with sequenced genomes. CISH controls T cell receptor (TCR) signaling, and variations of CISH with certain SNPs are associated with susceptibility to bacteremia, tuberculosis and malaria.

== Function ==
The protein encoded by this gene contains a SH2 domain and a SOCS box domain. The protein thus belongs to the cytokine-induced STAT inhibitor (CIS), also known as suppressor of cytokine signaling (SOCS) or STAT-induced STAT inhibitor (SSI), protein family. CIS family members are known to be cytokine-inducible negative regulators of cytokine signaling.

The expression of this gene can be induced by IL-2, IL-3, GM-CSF and EPO in hematopoietic cells. Proteasome-mediated degradation of this protein has been shown to be involved in the inactivation of the erythropoietin receptor.

CISH is induced by T cell receptor (TCR) ligation and negatively regulates it by targeting the critical signaling intermediate PLC-gamma-1 for degradation. The deletion of Cish in effector T cells has been shown to augment TCR signaling and subsequent effector cytokine release, proliferation and survival. The adoptive transfer of tumor-specific effector T cells knocked out or knocked down for CISH resulted in a significant increase in functional avidity and long-term tumor immunity. There are no changes in activity or phosphorylation of Cish's purported target, STAT5 in either the presence or absence of Cish.

In human tumor-infiltrating lymphocytes (TIL), CISH expression has been reported to be inversely expressed with known T cell activation/exhaustion markers and regulates their expression and neoantigen reactivity. Combination therapy with checkpoint blockade synergistically results in profound tumor regressing in a pre-clinical tumor model

== Interactions ==
CISH has been shown to interact with IL2RB and Growth hormone receptor. and PLCG1.
