= MAP4K1 =

Protein-coding gene in the species Homo sapiens

Identifiers
- Aliases: MAP4K1, HPK1, mitogen-activated protein kinase kinase kinase kinase 1
- External IDs: OMIM: 601983; MGI: 1346882; GeneCards: MAP4K1
Enzyme activity
EC #	BRENDA	ExPASy	KEGG	MetaCyc
2.7.11.1	↗	↗	↗	↗

Gene location (Human)
Chr.	Chromosome 19 (human)
Band	19q13.2	Start	38,587,641 bp
Band	19q13.2	End	38,618,882 bp

Gene location (Mouse)
Chr.	Chromosome 7 (mouse)
Band	7|7 B1	Start	28,681,475 bp
Band	7|7 B1	End	28,702,704 bp
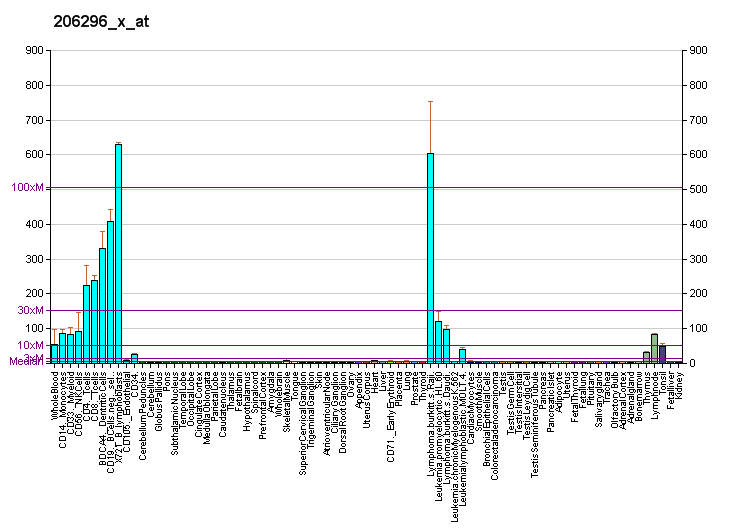

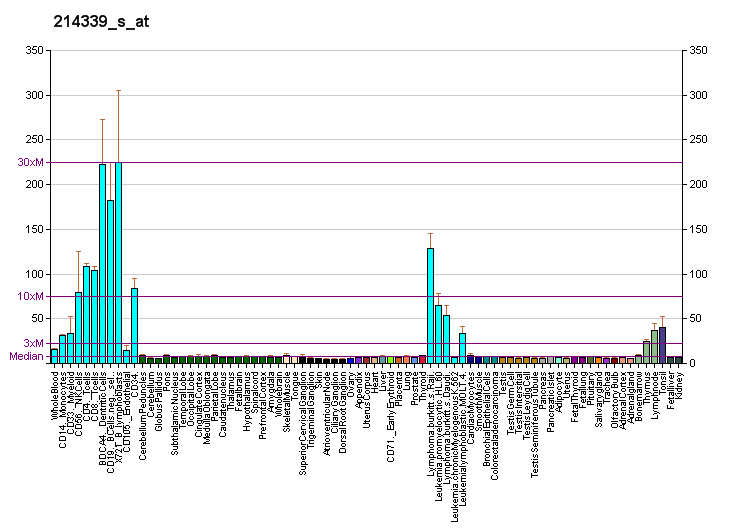

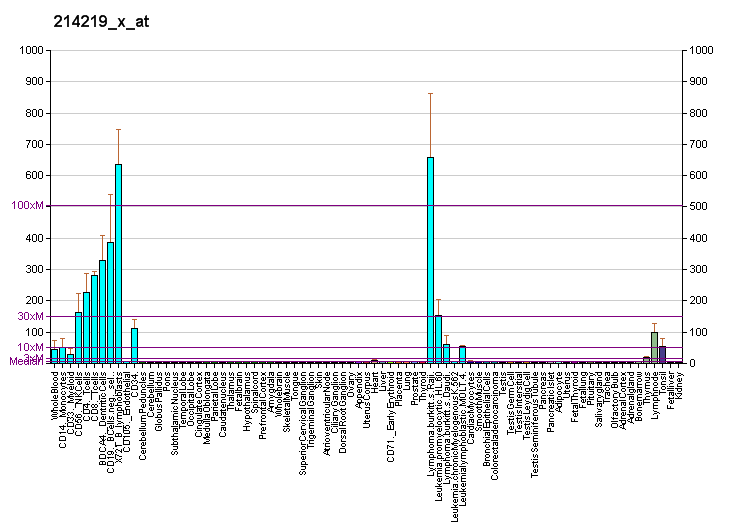
RNA expression pattern
Bgee	Human / Mouse (ortholog); Top expressed in: granulocyte; lymph node; spleen; appendix; bone marrow cell; blood; monocyte; tonsil; testicle; sural nerve / Top expressed in: mesenteric lymph nodes; spleen; thymus; spermatid; blood; ankle joint; morula; granulocyte; embryo; embryo; More reference expression data
BioGPS	More reference expression data
Gene ontology
Molecular function	transferase activity; protein kinase activity; MAP kinase kinase kinase kinase activity; protein serine/threonine kinase activity; nucleotide binding; protein binding; ATP binding; kinase activity
Cellular component	cytoplasm; membrane; intracellular anatomical structure
Biological process	protein autophosphorylation; protein phosphorylation; response to stress; cell population proliferation; intracellular signal transduction; peptidyl-serine phosphorylation; phosphorylation; regulation of mitotic cell cycle; regulation of apoptotic process; signal transduction; stress-activated protein kinase signaling cascade; activation of protein kinase activity; cellular response to phorbol 13-acetate 12-myristate
Sources:Amigo / QuickGO
Orthologs
Databases	NCBI: entry; OMA: entry
Species	Human	Mouse
Entrez	11184	26411
Ensembl	ENSG00000282928; ENSG00000104814	ENSMUSG00000037337
UniProt	Q92918	P70218
RefSeq (mRNA)	NM_001042600; NM_007181	NM_008279; NM_001355054
RefSeq (protein)	NP_001036065; NP_009112	NP_032305; NP_001341983
Location (UCSC)	Chr 19: 38.59 – 38.62 Mb	Chr 7: 28.68 – 28.7 Mb
PubMed search
- Wikidata
View/Edit Human	View/Edit Mouse

Mitogen-activated protein kinase kinase kinase kinase 1 is a protein kinase that in humans is encoded by the MAP4K1 gene. It is also known as HPK1 (Hematopoietic Progenitor Kinase 1). The protein has been shown to play a role in JNK activation.

== Interactions ==
MAP4K1 has been shown to interact with:

- B-cell linker,
- CRK,
- CRKL,
- Drebrin-like,
- GRAP2,
- Grb2,
- Linker of activated T cells, and
- NCK1.

Optimization of inhibitors of MAP4K1 for upregulating the T cell receptor signaling pathway has produced at least one compound that exhibits antitumor activity in an EMT6 syngeneic mouse model, and is an area of ongoing research.
