= GRAP =

Protein-coding gene in humans

Identifiers
- Aliases: GRAP, GRB2-related adaptor protein, GRB2 related adaptor protein, DFNB114
- External IDs: OMIM: 604330; MGI: 1918770; GeneCards: GRAP

Gene location (Human)
Chr.	Chromosome 17 (human)
Band	17p11.2	Start	19,020,656 bp
Band	17p11.2	End	19,047,011 bp

Gene location (Mouse)
Chr.	Chromosome 11 (mouse)
Band	11|11 B2	Start	61,544,091 bp
Band	11|11 B2	End	61,563,610 bp
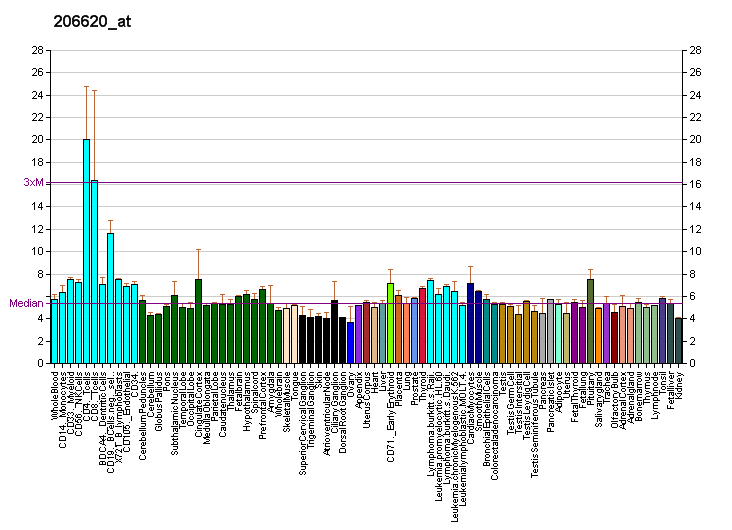
RNA expression pattern
Bgee	Human / Mouse (ortholog); Top expressed in: spleen; granulocyte; lymph node; blood; right lung; upper lobe of left lung; gallbladder; apex of heart; appendix; right lobe of thyroid gland / Top expressed in: mesenteric lymph nodes; thymus; spleen; right lung lobe; blood; lip; subcutaneous adipose tissue; embryo; left lung lobe; right kidney; More reference expression data
BioGPS	More reference expression data
Gene ontology
Molecular function	protein binding; non-membrane spanning protein tyrosine kinase activity; signaling receptor binding
Cellular component	cytoplasm; cytosol; extrinsic component of cytoplasmic side of plasma membrane
Biological process	cell-cell signaling; Ras protein signal transduction; positive regulation of signal transduction; transmembrane receptor protein tyrosine kinase signaling pathway; cell migration; cell differentiation; peptidyl-tyrosine autophosphorylation; regulation of cell population proliferation; innate immune response
Sources:Amigo / QuickGO
Orthologs
Databases	NCBI: entry; OMA: entry
Species	Human	Mouse
Entrez	10750	71520
Ensembl	ENSG00000154016	ENSMUSG00000004837
UniProt	Q13588	Q9CX99
RefSeq (mRNA)	NM_006613; NM_001330148	NM_027817
RefSeq (protein)	NP_001317077; NP_006604	NP_082093
Location (UCSC)	Chr 17: 19.02 – 19.05 Mb	Chr 11: 61.54 – 61.56 Mb
PubMed search
- Wikidata
View/Edit Human	View/Edit Mouse

GRB2-related adapter protein is a protein that in humans is encoded by the GRAP gene.

This gene encodes a member of the GRB2/Sem5 (C. elegans homolog)/Drk (Drosophila homolog) family. This member functions as a cytoplasmic signaling protein which contains an SH2 domain flanked by two SH3 domains. The SH2 domain interacts with ligand-activated receptors for stem cell factor and erythropoietin, and facilitates the formation of a stable complex with the BCR-ABL oncoprotein. This protein also associates with the Ras guanine nucleotide exchange factor SOS1 (son of sevenless homolog 1) through its N-terminal SH3 domain.

== Interactions ==
GRAP has been shown to interact with Linker of activated T cells.
