= ZAP70 deficiency =

- Other names: ZAP70 deficient SCID
- ZAP70 deficiency has an autosomal recessive pattern of inheritance.

ZAP70 deficiency, or ZAP70 deficient SCID, is a rare autosomal recessive form of severe combined immunodeficiency (SCID) resulting in a lack of CD8+ T cells. People with this disease lack the capability to fight infections, and it is fatal if untreated.

It is caused by a mutation in the ZAP70 gene.

== Presentation ==
Children with this condition typically present with infections and skin rashes. Unlike many forms of SCID, absolute lymphocyte count is normal and thymus is present.

== Cause ==
ZAP70 deficiency SCID is caused by a mutation is the ZAP70 gene, which is involved in the development of T cells.

== Diagnosis ==
It is characterized by a lack of CD8+ T cells and the presence of circulating CD4+ T cells which are unresponsive to T-cell receptor (TCR)-mediated stimuli. Diagnosis is usually made within the first six months of life. Genetic testing is required.

== Treatment ==
Hematopoietic stem cell transplantation is the only known cure for ZAP70 deficient SCID.

== Epidemiology ==
ZAP70 deficiency SCID is estimated to occur in approximately 1 in 50,000 people. Fewer than fifty people with this condition have been identified.
