= GRAP2 =

Protein-coding gene in the species Homo sapiens

Identifiers
- Aliases: GRAP2, GADS, GRAP-2, GRB2L, GRBLG, GRID, GRPL, GrbX, Grf40, Mona, P38, GRB2-related adaptor protein 2, GRB2 related adaptor protein 2
- External IDs: OMIM: 604518; MGI: 1333842; GeneCards: GRAP2

Gene location (Human)
Chr.	Chromosome 22 (human)
Band	22q13.1	Start	39,901,084 bp
Band	22q13.1	End	39,973,721 bp

Gene location (Mouse)
Chr.	Chromosome 15 (mouse)
Band	15|15 E1	Start	80,456,795 bp
Band	15|15 E1	End	80,537,055 bp
RNA expression pattern
Bgee	Human / Mouse (ortholog); Top expressed in: monocyte; granulocyte; blood; thymus; lymph node; testicle; spleen; epithelium of colon; appendix; bone marrow cell / Top expressed in: thymus; blood; spleen; yolk sac; embryo; mesenteric lymph nodes; granulocyte; genital tubercle; tail of embryo; seminiferous tubule; More reference expression data
BioGPS	More reference expression data
Gene ontology
Molecular function	protein binding; non-membrane spanning protein tyrosine kinase activity; signaling receptor binding
Cellular component	cytoplasm; cytosol; endosome; nucleus; extrinsic component of cytoplasmic side of plasma membrane
Biological process	Fc-epsilon receptor signaling pathway; cell-cell signaling; T cell costimulation; Ras protein signal transduction; T cell receptor signaling pathway; positive regulation of signal transduction; transmembrane receptor protein tyrosine kinase signaling pathway; cell migration; cell differentiation; peptidyl-tyrosine autophosphorylation; regulation of cell population proliferation; innate immune response
Sources:Amigo / QuickGO
Orthologs
Databases	NCBI: entry; OMA: entry
Species	Human	Mouse
Entrez	9402	17444
Ensembl	ENSG00000100351	ENSMUSG00000042351
UniProt	O75791	O89100
RefSeq (mRNA)	NM_001291824; NM_001291825; NM_001291826; NM_001291828; NM_004810	NM_001289442; NM_010815
RefSeq (protein)	NP_001278753; NP_001278754; NP_001278755; NP_001278757; NP_004801	NP_001276371; NP_034945
Location (UCSC)	Chr 22: 39.9 – 39.97 Mb	Chr 15: 80.46 – 80.54 Mb
PubMed search
- Wikidata
View/Edit Human	View/Edit Mouse

GRB2-related adapter protein 2 also known as GRB2-related adaptor downstream of Shc (GADS) is a 37 kDa protein that in humans is encoded by the GRAP2 gene.

== Function ==
This gene encodes a member of the GRB2/Sem5/Drk family. This member is an adaptor-like protein involved in leukocyte-specific protein-tyrosine kinase signaling. Like its related family member, GRB2-related adaptor protein (GRAP), this protein contains an SH2 domain flanked by two SH3 domains. This protein interacts with other proteins, such as GRB2-associated binding protein 1 (GAB1) and the SLP-76 leukocyte protein (LCP2), through its SH3 domains. Transcript variants utilizing alternative polyA sites exist.

== Interactions ==
GRAP2 has been shown to interact with:

- CCNDBP1,
- CD28,
- Linker of activated T cells,
- Lymphocyte cytosolic protein 2
- MAP4K1, and
- STAMBP.
