= PLCG1 =

Protein found in humans

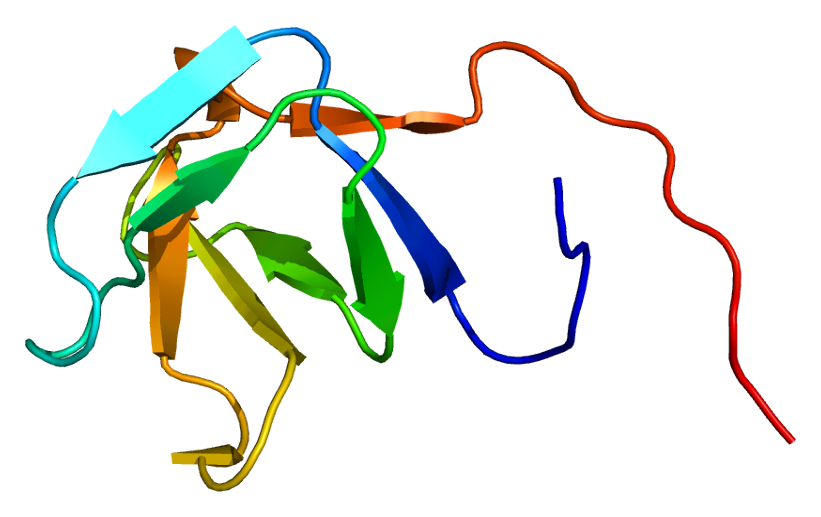

Identifiers
- Aliases: PLCG1, NCKAP3, PLC-II, PLC1, PLC148, PLCgamma1, phospholipase C gamma 1
- External IDs: OMIM: 172420; MGI: 97615; GeneCards: PLCG1
Available structures
| PDB | Ortholog search: PDBe RCSB |
| PDB | List of PDB id codes 1HSQ, 2HSP, 4EY0, 4FBN |
Enzyme activity
| EC # | BRENDA | ExPASy | KEGG | MetaCyc |
|---|---|---|---|---|
| 3.1.4.11 | ↗ | ↗ | ↗ | ↗ |

Gene location (Human)
| Chr. | Chromosome 20 (human) |
| Band | 20q12 | Start | 41,136,960 bp |
| Band | 20q12 | End | 41,196,801 bp |

Gene location (Mouse)
| Chr. | Chromosome 2 (mouse) |
| Band | 2 H2|2 80.97 cM | Start | 160,573,220 bp |
| Band | 2 H2|2 80.97 cM | End | 160,617,680 bp |
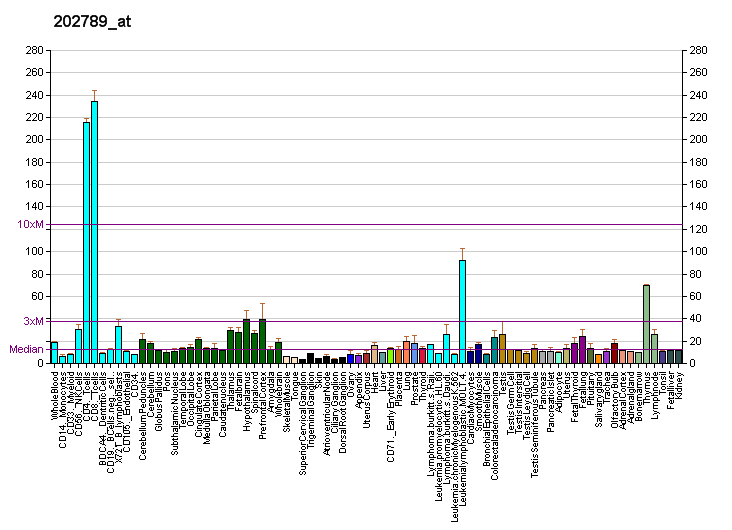

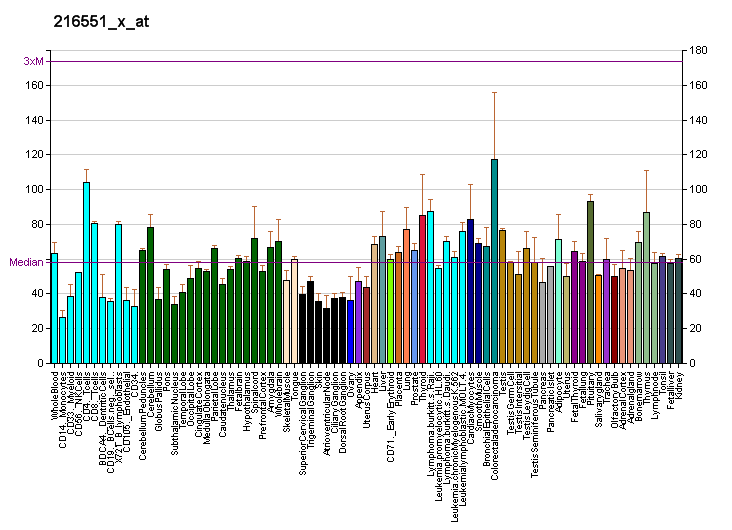
RNA expression pattern
| Bgee | Human / Mouse (ortholog); Top expressed in: right hemisphere of cerebellum; right lobe of thyroid gland; ganglionic eminence; left lobe of thyroid gland; right ovary; ventricular zone; canal of the cervix; body of uterus; left ovary; stromal cell of endometrium / Top expressed in: otolith organ; hand; utricle; aortic valve; ascending aorta; Rostral migratory stream; fossa; cumulus cell; internal carotid artery; condyle; More reference expression data |
| BioGPS | More reference expression data |
Gene ontology
| Molecular function | calcium ion binding; neurotrophin TRKA receptor binding; receptor tyrosine kinase binding; signal transducer activity; metal ion binding; protein binding; phosphoric diester hydrolase activity; phospholipase C activity; glutamate receptor binding; hydrolase activity; protein kinase binding; phosphatidylinositol phospholipase C activity |
| Cellular component | cytoplasm; cytosol; cell projection; cell-cell junction; ruffle; plasma membrane; COP9 signalosome; lamellipodium; Schaffer collateral - CA1 synapse; glutamatergic synapse; intracellular anatomical structure |
| Biological process | intracellular signal transduction; Fc-gamma receptor signaling pathway involved in phagocytosis; lipid metabolism; positive regulation of epithelial cell migration; positive regulation of release of sequestered calcium ion into cytosol; in utero embryonic development; inositol phosphate metabolic process; positive regulation of angiogenesis; cellular response to epidermal growth factor stimulus; Fc-epsilon receptor signaling pathway; lipid catabolic process; positive regulation of blood vessel endothelial cell migration; phospholipid catabolic process; viral process; T cell receptor signaling pathway; cell migration; leukocyte migration; calcium-mediated signaling; epidermal growth factor receptor signaling pathway; axon guidance; positive regulation of vascular endothelial cell proliferation; positive regulation of endothelial cell apoptotic process; signal transduction; activation of phospholipase C activity; positive regulation of phospholipase C activity; modulation of chemical synaptic transmission; calcium ion transport; inositol trisphosphate biosynthetic process; phosphatidylinositol-mediated signaling; release of sequestered calcium ion into cytosol |
Sources:Amigo / QuickGO
Orthologs
| Databases | NCBI: entry; OMA: entry |
| Species | Human | Mouse |
| Entrez | 5335 | 18803 |
| Ensembl | ENSG00000124181 | ENSMUSG00000016933 |
| UniProt | P19174 | Q62077 |
| RefSeq (mRNA) | NM_002660; NM_182811 | NM_021280 |
| RefSeq (protein) | NP_002651; NP_877963 | NP_067255 |
| Location (UCSC) | Chr 20: 41.14 – 41.2 Mb | Chr 2: 160.57 – 160.62 Mb |
| PubMed search |
- Wikidata
| View/Edit Human | View/Edit Mouse |

Phospholipase C, gamma 1, also known as PLCG1 and PLCgamma1, is a protein that in humans involved in cell growth, migration, apoptosis, and proliferation. It is encoded by the PLCG1 gene and is part of the PLC superfamily.

== Function ==
PLCγ1 is a cell growth factor from the PLC superfamily. PLCγ1 is used during cell growth and in cell migration and apoptosis, all of which are vital cell processes that, if disrupted by mutations, can cause cancerous cells to form within the body. Mutations in this protein show an increase in issues in cells regarding regulation of proliferation and their cell signaling. PLCγ1 roles are also involved in neuronal actin growth, calcium signaling, and brain development. It is highly regulated by multiple factors, such as PIK3, AMPK, and FAK. It is part of the PIP3 pathway and leads to and increase in calcium in the cells. In neuronal cells, PLCγ1 is highly involved in actin cytoskeleton organization and synaptic plasticity. The basic PLCγ1 pathway, as scientists currently understand it, is seen below.

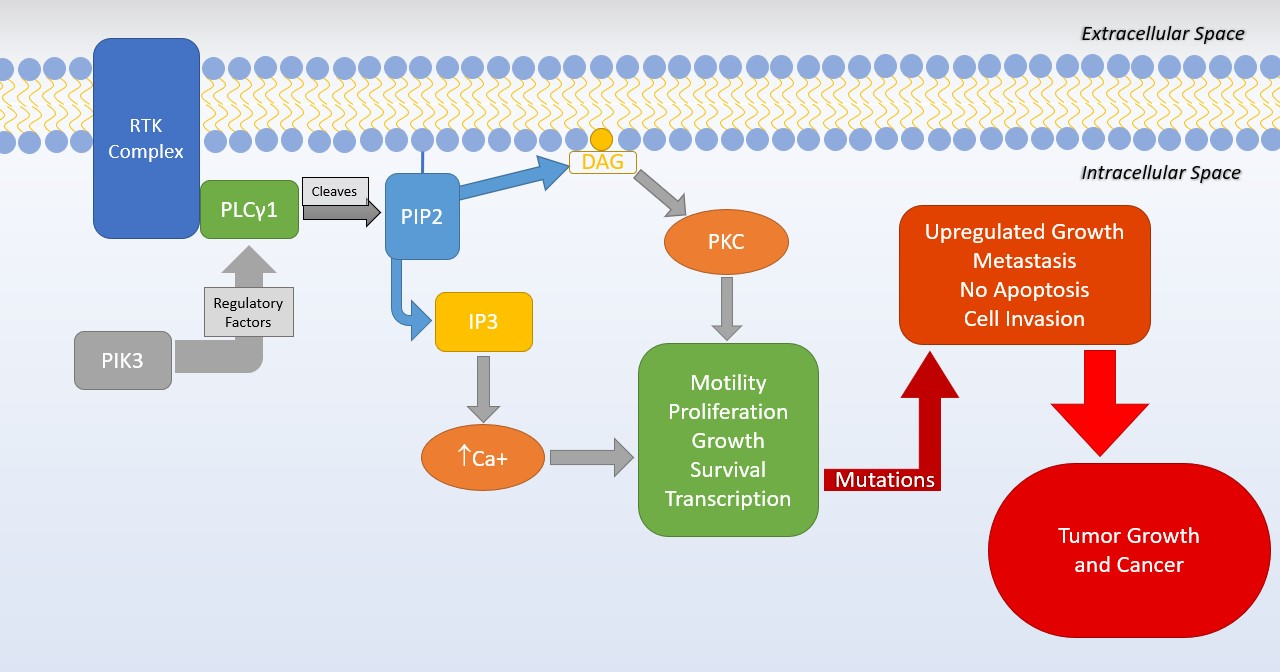
PLCG1 Pathway

The protein encoded by this gene catalyzes the formation of inositol 1,4,5-trisphosphate (IP3) and diacylglycerol (DAG) from phosphatidylinositol 4,5-bisphosphate. This reaction uses calcium as a cofactor and plays an important role in the intracellular transduction of receptor-mediated tyrosine kinase activators. For example, when activated by SRC, the encoded protein causes the Ras guanine nucleotide exchange factor RASGRP1 to translocate to the Golgi apparatus, where it activates Ras. Also, this protein has been shown to be a major substrate for heparin-binding growth factor 1 (acidic fibroblast growth factor)-activated tyrosine kinase. The receptor protein tyrosine phosphatase PTPmu (PTPRM) is capable of dephosphorylating PLCG1. Two transcript variants encoding different isoforms have been found for this gene.

Common to all PLC isozymes, PLCG1 consists of an N-terminal PH domain, which translocates PLC to the plasma membrane and binds PIP3; four EF hands; an X and Y catalytic region comprising the TIM barrel; and a C-terminal C2 domain. Specific to the PLCG isozymes is a large separation between the X and Y domains consisting of a split PH domain, tandem SH2 domains, and an SH3 domain. The SH2 domains bind phosphorylated tyrosine residues on target proteins via their FLVR sequence motifs, activating the catalytic function of PLCg; and the SH3 domain binds to proline-rich sequences on the target protein.

PLCG1 can be activated by receptor tyrosine kinases (RTKs) and non-receptor tyrosine kinases. For example, when activated, fibroblast growth factor receptor 1 and epidermal growth factor receptor are RTKs that have phosphorylated tyrosines, which provide docking sites for PLCG1 SH2 domains. The activated RTKs phosphoylate PLCG1 at tyrosines located at position 472, 771, 775, 783, and 1254. Non-receptor tyrosine kinases interact with PLCG1 in large complexes at the plasma membrane. For example, in T cells, Lck and Fyn (Src family kinases) phosphorylate immunoreceptor tyrosine-based activation motifs (ITAMs) on the T-cell antigen receptor (TCR). The phosphorylated ITAMs recruit ZAP-70, which phosphorylates tyrosines in LAT and SLP-76. PLCg1 binds to LAT through its n-terminal SH2 domain and to SLP-76 via its SH3 domain.

Has been shown to interact with CISH which negatively regulates it by targeting it for degradation. The deletion of Cish in effector T cells has been shown to augment TCR signaling and subsequent effector cytokine release, proliferation and survival. The adoptive transfer of tumor-specific effector T cells knocked out or knocked down for CISH resulted in a significant increase in functional avidity and long-term tumor immunity. There are no changes in activity or phosphorylation of Cish's purported target, STAT5 in either the presence or absence of Cish.

In vitro studies have shown signs of PLCγ1 having many cell-motility functions, however in vivo have not been able to show a physiological role for PLCγ1. While PLCγ1 is well documented and easily found in the body, clear connections and roles for PLCγ1 have been difficult to find in in vivo studies. Despite this, there is still able to find links between levels of PLCγ1 and cancer patient survivability.

== Cancer ==
Mutations in PLCγ1 can lead to cancer cell proliferations and inhibition can lead to tumor growth. PLCγ1 is involved in cell proliferation, and mutations cause it to be over expressed and help the progression of tumor cells. This aspect of PLCγ1 also helps cancer migration and metastasis away from the original tumor cells. There is also a link between PLCγ1 and PDK, the PDK-PLCγ1 pathway, which is a vital part of cancer cell invasion.

The inhibition of PLCγ1 is linked to a decrease in tumor growth and metastasis. PLCγ1 is acting as a vital part in stopping apoptosis in cells, and thus by inhibiting PLCγ1 the body better allows programmed cell death and avoidance of tumors. The main role found for PLCγ1 is cell growth, and this role in specific is why it is becoming more commonly studied for anti-cancer drugs. Tissue samples from cancer patients the PLCγ1 levels are not elevated, however, regulatory factors for this proteins are lowered and that amplification of PLCγ1 is extremely high. The regulatory proteins that stop PLCγ1 have been turned off by the cell, which means that while there is no increase in the physical protein PLCγ1 there is an increase in how much work it is doing - nothing is stopping it from over working itself. Studies also showed that adding new regulatory to cells in vitro helped reduce previously amplified PLCγ1. This information has encouraged PLCγ1 becoming an anti-cancer drug target despite the issues that come with targeting intermembrane proteins.

== Interactions ==
PLCG1 has been shown to interact with:

- BAG3,
- CD117,
- CD31,
- Cbl gene
- CISH
- Epidermal growth factor receptor,
- Eukaryotic translation elongation factor 1 alpha 1,
- FLT1,
- GAB1,
- GIT1,
- Grb2,
- HER2/neu,
- IRS2,
- ITK,
- KHDRBS1,
- Linker of activated T cells,
- Lymphocyte cytosolic protein 2,
- PDGFRA,
- PLD2,
- RHOA,
- SOS1,
- TUB,
- TrkA,
- TrkB,
- VAV1, and
- Wiskott-Aldrich syndrome protein.

== See also ==
- Phospholipase C
