= Cyclin D1 =

Protein found in humans

CCND1
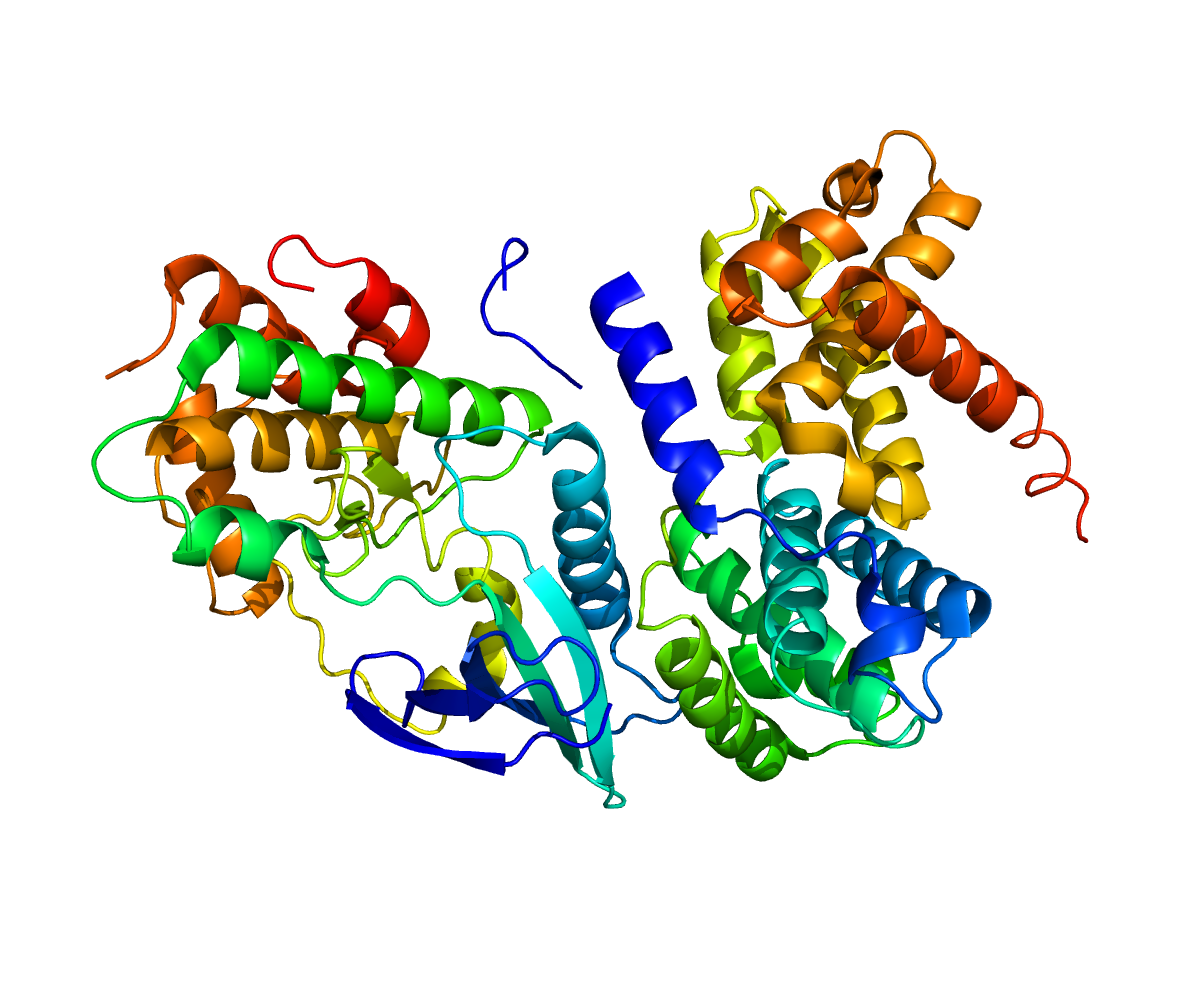

Identifiers
- Aliases: CCND1, BCL1, D11S287E, PRAD1, U21B31, cyclin D1
- External IDs: OMIM: 168461; MGI: 88313; GeneCards: CCND1
Available structures
PDB	Ortholog search: PDBe RCSB
PDB	List of PDB id codes 2W96, 2W99, 2W9F, 2W9Z

Gene location (Human)
Chr.	Chromosome 11 (human)
Band	11q13.3	Start	69,641,156 bp
Band	11q13.3	End	69,654,474 bp

Gene location (Mouse)
Chr.	Chromosome 7 (mouse)
Band	7 F5|7 88.92 cM	Start	144,483,668 bp
Band	7 F5|7 88.92 cM	End	144,493,662 bp
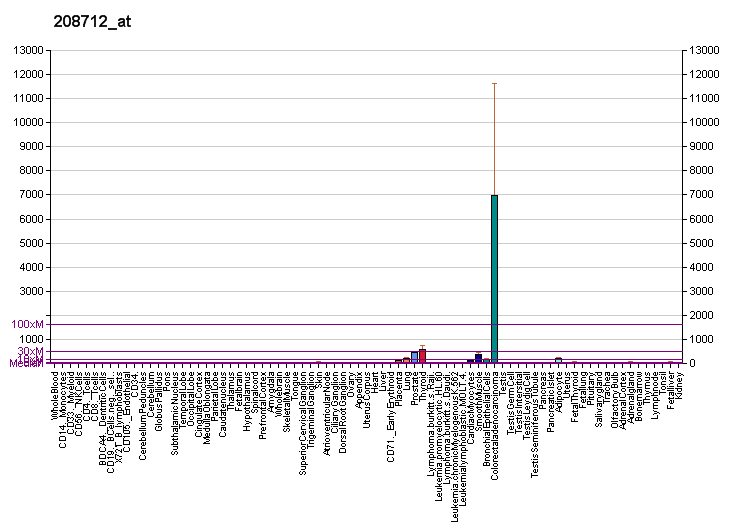

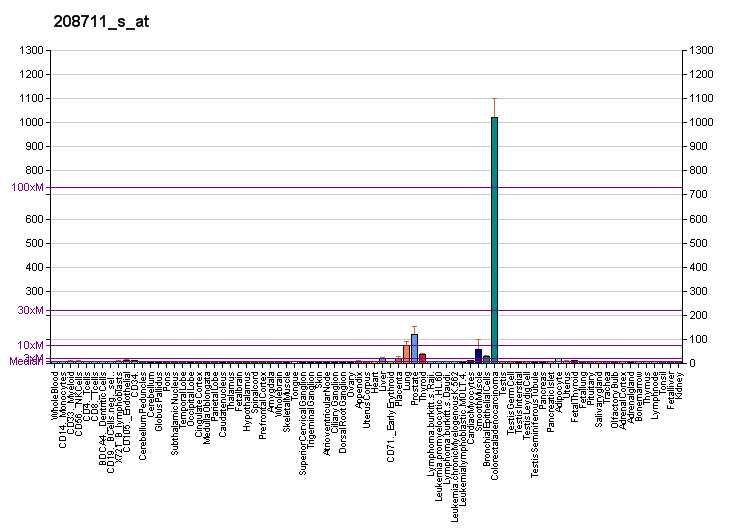
RNA expression pattern
Bgee	Human / Mouse (ortholog); Top expressed in: stromal cell of endometrium; skin of arm; skin of thigh; mucosa of paranasal sinus; sural nerve; gingival epithelium; nipple; tibia; hair follicle; skin of abdomen / Top expressed in: calvaria; superior cervical ganglion; seminal vesicula; tail of embryo; endothelial cell of lymphatic vessel; stroma of bone marrow; otic vesicle; mandibular prominence; genital tubercle; human fetus; More reference expression data
BioGPS	More reference expression data
Gene ontology
Molecular function	protein kinase activity; transcription corepressor activity; transcription factor binding; histone deacetylase binding; kinase activity; cyclin-dependent protein serine/threonine kinase regulator activity; protein binding; enzyme binding; proline-rich region binding; protein kinase binding; cyclin-dependent protein serine/threonine kinase activity; protein-containing complex binding
Cellular component	cytoplasm; cytosol; cyclin-dependent protein kinase holoenzyme complex; membrane; bicellular tight junction; transcription repressor complex; intracellular anatomical structure; nucleoplasm; nucleus
Biological process	cellular response to organic substance; mammary gland epithelial cell proliferation; positive regulation of mammary gland epithelial cell proliferation; response to estradiol; positive regulation of protein phosphorylation; Leydig cell differentiation; regulation of transcription, DNA-templated; response to organic cyclic compound; response to steroid hormone; response to corticosterone; negative regulation of Wnt signaling pathway; response to magnesium ion; response to glucocorticoid; re-entry into mitotic cell cycle; negative regulation of transcription by RNA polymerase II; Wnt signaling pathway; mammary gland alveolus development; response to organic substance; transcription, DNA-templated; response to vitamin E; regulation of cell cycle; response to iron ion; response to estrogen; response to calcium ion; cell division; cellular response to DNA damage stimulus; endoplasmic reticulum unfolded protein response; protein phosphorylation; regulation of G1/S transition of mitotic cell cycle; liver regeneration; mitotic G1 DNA damage checkpoint signaling; animal organ regeneration; response to organonitrogen compound; positive regulation of cell population proliferation; positive regulation of cyclin-dependent protein serine/threonine kinase activity; canonical Wnt signaling pathway; response to UV-A; cell cycle; liver development; positive regulation of G2/M transition of mitotic cell cycle; lactation; response to ethanol; response to leptin; negative regulation of epithelial cell differentiation; fat cell differentiation; response to X-ray; positive regulation of cell cycle; transcription initiation from RNA polymerase II promoter; G1/S transition of mitotic cell cycle; cytokine-mediated signaling pathway; positive regulation of epithelial cell proliferation; regulation of cyclin-dependent protein serine/threonine kinase activity; mitotic cell cycle; regulation of mitotic nuclear division; positive regulation of G1/S transition of mitotic cell cycle
Sources:Amigo / QuickGO
Orthologs
Databases	NCBI: entry; OMA: entry
Species	Human	Mouse
Entrez	595	12443
Ensembl	ENSG00000110092	ENSMUSG00000070348
UniProt	P24385	P25322
RefSeq (mRNA)	NM_053056	NM_007631; NM_001379248
RefSeq (protein)	NP_444284	NP_031657; NP_001366177
Location (UCSC)	Chr 11: 69.64 – 69.65 Mb	Chr 7: 144.48 – 144.49 Mb
PubMed search
- Wikidata
View/Edit Human	View/Edit Mouse

Cyclin D1 is a protein that in humans is encoded by the CCND1 gene.

== Gene expression ==
The CCND1 gene encodes the cyclin D1 protein. The human CCND1 gene is located on the long arm of chromosome 11 (band 11q13). It is 13,388 base pairs long, and translates into 295 amino acids. Cyclin D1 is expressed in all adult human tissues with the exception of cells derived from bone marrow stem cell lines (both lymphoid and myeloid).

== Protein structure ==
Cyclin D1 is composed of the following protein domains and motifs:

- retinoblastoma protein (pRb) binding motif;
- cyclin box domain for cyclin-dependent kinase (CDK) binding and CDK inhibitor binding;
- LxxLL binding motif for co-activator recruitment;
- PEST sequence that may mark the protein for degradation;
- threonine residue (threonine 286) that controls nuclear export and protein stability.

== Function ==
The protein encoded by this gene belongs to the highly conserved cyclin family, whose members are characterized by a dramatic periodicity in protein abundance throughout the cell cycle. Cyclins function as regulators of CDKs (cyclin-dependent kinase). Different cyclins exhibit distinct expression and degradation patterns which contribute to the temporal coordination of each mitotic event. This cyclin forms a complex with and functions as a regulatory subunit of CDK4 or CDK6, whose activity is required for cell cycle G1/S transition. This protein has been shown to interact with tumor suppressor protein Rb and the expression of this gene is regulated positively by Rb. Mutations, amplification and overexpression of this gene, which alters cell cycle progression, are observed frequently in a variety of tumors and may contribute to tumorigenesis.

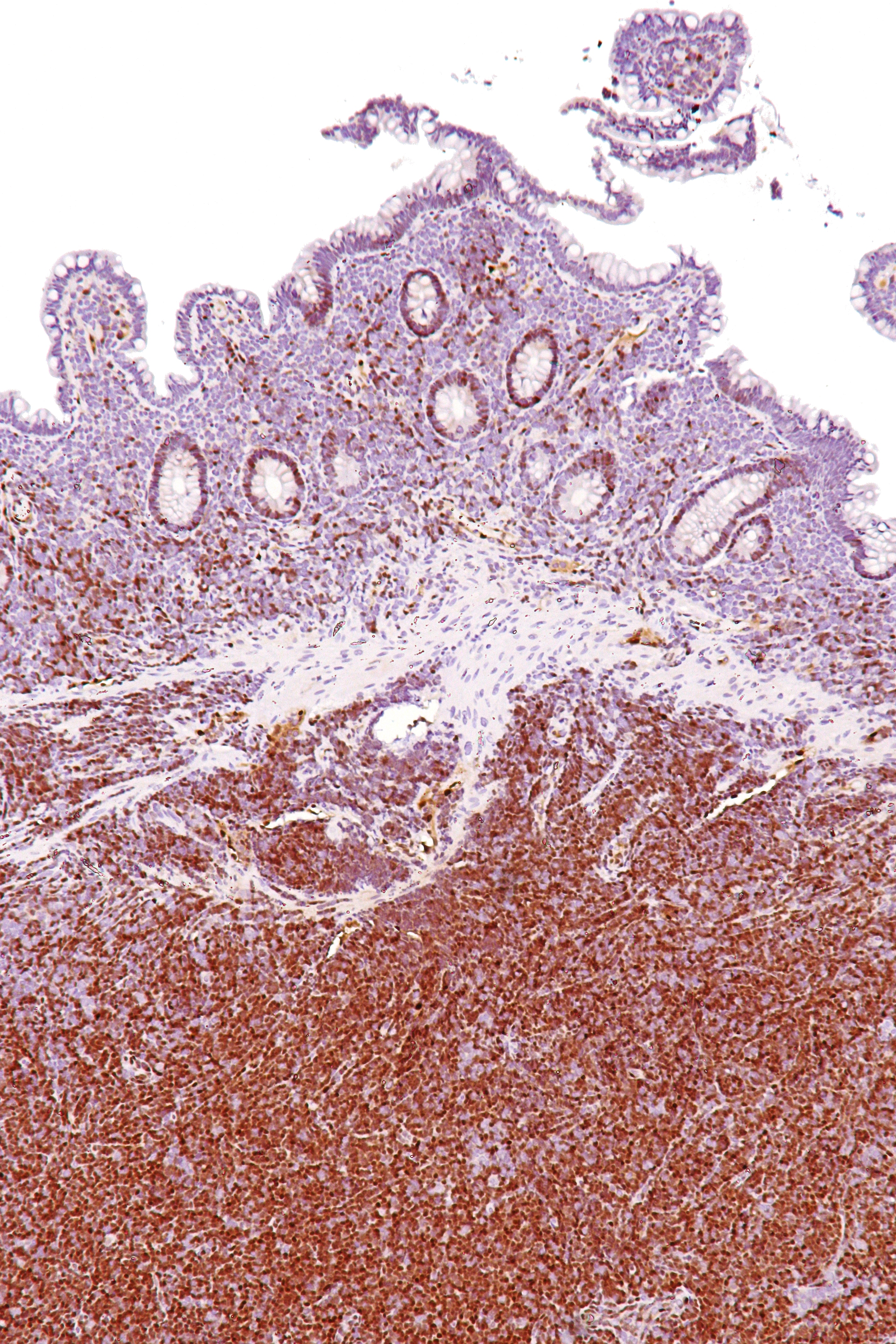
Micrograph of cyclin D1 staining in a mantle cell lymphoma

Immunohistochemical staining of cyclin D1 antibodies is used to diagnose mantle cell lymphoma.

Cyclin D1 has been found to be overexpressed in breast carcinoma. Its potential use as a biomarker was suggested.

=== Normal function ===
Cyclin D1 was originally cloned as a breakpoint rearrangement in parathyroid adenoma and was shown to be required for progression through the G1 phase of the cell cycle to induce cell migration, angiogenesis and to induce the Warburg effect. Cyclin D1 is a protein required for progression through the G1 phase of the cell cycle. During the G1 phase, it is synthesized rapidly and accumulates in the nucleus, and is degraded as the cell enters the S phase. Cyclin D1 is a regulatory subunit of cyclin-dependent kinases CDK4 and CDK6. The protein dimerizes with CDK4/6 to regulate the G1/S phase transition and entry into the S-phase.

=== CDK dependent functions ===
The cyclin D1-CDK4 complex promotes passage through the G1 phase by inhibiting the retinoblastoma protein (pRb). Cyclin D1-CDK4 inhibits pRb through phosphorylation, allowing E2F transcription factors to transcribe genes required for entry into the S phase. Inactive pRb allows cell cycle progression through the G1/S transition and allows for DNA synthesis. Cyclin D1-CDK4 also enables the activation of cyclin E-CDK2 complex by sequestering Cip/Kip family CDK inhibitory proteins p21 and p27, allowing entry into the S phase.

Cyclin D1-CDK4 also associates with several transcription factors and transcriptional co-regulators.

=== CDK independent functions ===
Independent of CDK, cyclin D1 binds to nuclear receptors (including estrogen receptor α, thyroid hormone receptor, PPARγ and AR) to regulate cell proliferation, growth, and differentiation. Cyclin D1 also binds to histone acetylases and histone deacetylases to regulate cell proliferation and cell differentiation genes in the early to mid-G1 phase.

== Synthesis and degradation ==
Increasing cyclin D1 levels during the G1 phase is induced by mitogenic growth factors primarily through Ras-mediated pathways, and hormones. These Ras-mediated pathways lead to the increase in transcription of cyclin D1, and inhibit its proteolysis and export from the nucleus. Cyclin D1 is degraded by the proteasome upon phosphorylation of threonine 286 and subsequent ubiquitylation via the CRL4-AMBRA1 E3 ubiquitin ligase complex.

== Clinical significance ==
=== Deregulation in cancer ===
Cyclin D1 overexpression has been shown to correlate with early cancer onset and tumor progression and it can lead to oncogenesis by increasing anchorage-independent growth and angiogenesis via VEGF production. Cyclin D1 overexpression can also down-regulate Fas expression, leading to increased chemotherapeutic resistance and protection from apoptosis.

An abundance of cyclin D1 can be caused by various types of deregulation, including:

- amplification of the CCND1 gene / overexpression of cyclin D1;
- chromosomal translocation of the CCND1 gene;
- mutations in the degradation motif recognized by the CRL4-AMBRA1 E3 ubiquitin ligase;
- disruption of nuclear export and proteolysis of cyclin D1;
- induction of transcription by oncogenic Ras, Src, ErbB2 and STATs;

Cyclin D1 overexpression is correlated with shorter cancer patient survival and increased metastasis. Amplification of the CCND1 gene is present in:

- non-small cell lung cancers (30–46%)
- head and neck squamous cell carcinomas (30–50%)
- pancreatic carcinomas (25%)
- bladder cancer (15%)
- pituitary adenomas (49–54%)
- breast carcinoma (13%)

Cyclin D1 overexpression is strongly correlated to ER+ breast cancer and deregulation of cyclin D1 is associated with hormone therapy resistance in breast cancer. Overexpression of Cyclin D1b, an isoform, is also present in breast and prostate cancers.

Chromosomal translocation around the cyclin D1 gene locus is often seen in B mantle cell lymphoma. In mantle cell lymphoma, cyclin D1 is translocated to the IgH promoter leading to cyclin D1 overexpression. Chromosomal translocation of the cyclin D1 gene locus is also observed in 15–20% of multiple myelomas.

=== Therapeutic target in cancer ===
Cyclin D1 and the mechanisms it regulates have the potential to be a therapeutic target for cancer drugs:

Target	Methods of Inhibition
Inhibition of cyclin D1	Inhibiting translation of cyclin D1 mRNA via mTOR inhibitors and RXR activators.
Inducing Cyclin D1 degradation	Retinoid mediated cyclin D1 degradation via the ubiquitin proteolytic pathway; Differentiation-inducing factor-1 (DIF-1) induced ubiquitin-dependent degradation; Inhibition of cyclin D1 protein synthesis
Inducing nuclear export of Cyclin D1	Histone deacetylase inhibitors (HDACIs) to induce nuclear export of Cyclin D1
Inhibition of cyclin D1-CDK4/6	Small molecule CDK inhibitors

== Interactions ==
Cyclin D1 has been shown to interact with:

- NR3C4,
- BRCA1,
- CCNDBP1,
- CDK4,
- CDK6,
- ESR1,
- HDAC3,
- HDACs,
- NEUROD1,
- NCOA1,
- NRF1,
- p300,
- PACSIN2,
- PCNA,
- PPARG,
- RAD51,
- RB1,
- TAF1, and
- NR1A2.

== See also ==
- Parathyroid adenoma
- Mantle cell lymphoma
