= ZAP70 =

Protein-coding gene in the species Homo sapiens

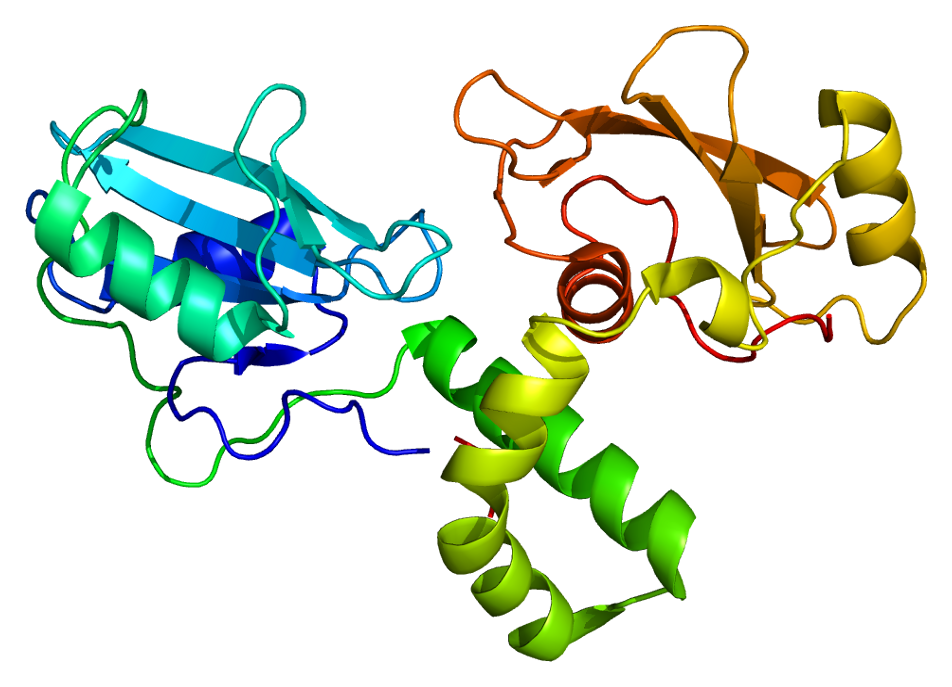

Identifiers
- Aliases: ZAP70, SRK, STCD, STD, TZK, ZAP-70, zeta chain of T cell receptor associated protein kinase 70kDa, zeta chain of T cell receptor associated protein kinase 70, zeta chain of T-cell receptor associated protein kinase 70, IMD48, ADMIO2
- External IDs: OMIM: 176947; MGI: 99613; GeneCards: ZAP70
Available structures
PDB	Ortholog search: PDBe RCSB
PDB	List of PDB id codes 4XZ0, 1FBV, 1M61, 1U59, 2CBL, 2OQ1, 2OZO, 2Y1N, 3ZNI, 4A4B, 4A4C, 4K2R, 4XZ1
Enzyme activity
EC #	BRENDA	ExPASy	KEGG	MetaCyc
2.7.10.2	↗	↗	↗	↗

Gene location (Human)
Chr.	Chromosome 2 (human)
Band	2q11.2	Start	97,713,576 bp
Band	2q11.2	End	97,739,862 bp

Gene location (Mouse)
Chr.	Chromosome 1 (mouse)
Band	1 B|1 15.41 cM	Start	36,800,879 bp
Band	1 B|1 15.41 cM	End	36,821,899 bp
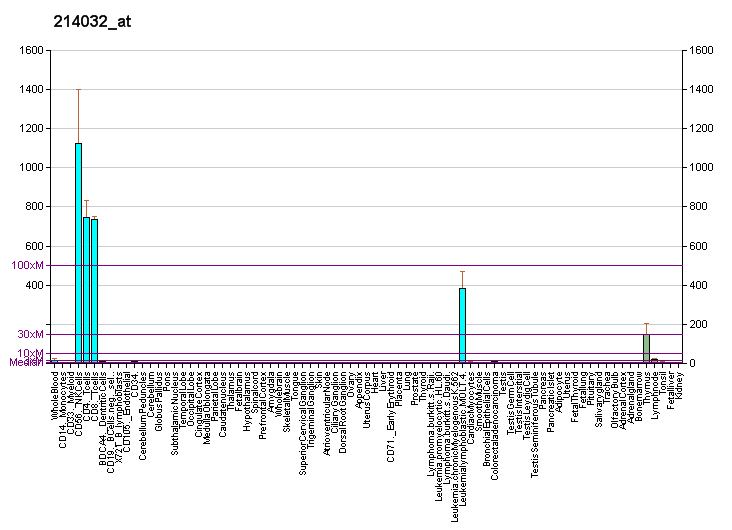
RNA expression pattern
Bgee	Human / Mouse (ortholog); Top expressed in: granulocyte; lymph node; blood; spleen; appendix; thymus; testicle; gallbladder; upper lobe of left lung; mucosa of transverse colon / Top expressed in: thymus; mesenteric lymph nodes; white pulp; blood; left lobe of liver; morula; embryo; dentate gyrus of hippocampal formation granule cell; embryo; blastocyst; More reference expression data
BioGPS	More reference expression data
Gene ontology
Molecular function	transferase activity; nucleotide binding; protein kinase activity; non-membrane spanning protein tyrosine kinase activity; kinase activity; protein binding; protein tyrosine kinase activity; signaling receptor binding; ATP binding; phosphotyrosine residue binding
Cellular component	cytoplasm; cytosol; membrane; cell-cell junction; extrinsic component of cytoplasmic side of plasma membrane; plasma membrane; T cell receptor complex; immunological synapse; membrane raft
Biological process	positive regulation of T cell differentiation; T cell migration; positive regulation of calcium-mediated signaling; intracellular signal transduction; adaptive immune response; phosphorylation; transmembrane receptor protein tyrosine kinase signaling pathway; immune system process; T cell aggregation; beta selection; negative thymic T cell selection; protein phosphorylation; B cell activation; T cell differentiation; immune response; positive thymic T cell selection; peptidyl-tyrosine autophosphorylation; protein autophosphorylation; peptidyl-tyrosine phosphorylation; innate immune response; T cell receptor signaling pathway; thymic T cell selection; positive regulation of alpha-beta T cell differentiation; T cell activation; regulation of cell population proliferation; positive regulation of alpha-beta T cell proliferation
Sources:Amigo / QuickGO
Orthologs
Databases	NCBI: entry; OMA: entry
Species	Human	Mouse
Entrez	7535	22637
Ensembl	ENSG00000115085	ENSMUSG00000026117
UniProt	P43403	P43404
RefSeq (mRNA)	NM_001079; NM_207519; NM_001378594	NM_009539; NM_001289612; NM_001289765; NM_001289766
RefSeq (protein)	NP_001070; NP_997402; NP_001365523	NP_001276541; NP_001276694; NP_001276695; NP_033565
Location (UCSC)	Chr 2: 97.71 – 97.74 Mb	Chr 1: 36.8 – 36.82 Mb
PubMed search
- Wikidata
View/Edit Human	View/Edit Mouse

ZAP-70 (Zeta-chain-associated protein kinase 70) is a protein normally expressed near the surface membrane of lymphocytes (T cells, natural killer cells, and a subset of B cells). It is most prominently known to be recruited upon antigen binding to the T cell receptor (TCR), and it plays a critical role in T cell signaling.

ZAP-70 was initially discovered in TCR-stimulated Jurkat cells, an immortal line of human T lymphocytes, in 1991. Its molecular weight is 70 kDa, and it is a member of the protein-tyrosine kinase family and is a close homolog of SYK. SYK and ZAP70 share a common evolutionary origin and split from a common ancestor in the jawed vertebrates. The importance of ZAP-70 in T cell activation was determined when comparing ZAP-70 expression in patients with SCID (severe combined immunodeficiency). ZAP-70 deficient individuals were found to have no functioning T cells in their peripheral blood, suggesting that ZAP-70 is a critical component of T cell activation and development.

ZAP-70 expression in B cells is correlated with the development of chronic lymphocytic leukemia (CLL).

== Function ==
The T cell receptor has no innate enzymatic activity. Due to this, T cell receptors rely on signaling molecules to transduce a signal from the cell membrane. ZAP-70 is a critical cytoplasmic tyrosine kinase that initiates a signal pathway downstream of an activated T cell receptor.

T lymphocytes are activated by engagement of the T cell receptor with processed antigen fragments presented by professional antigen presenting cells (i.e. macrophages, dendritic cells, Langerhans cells and B cells) via the MHC. Upon this activation, the TCR co-receptor CD4 (expressed on T helper cells) or CD8 (expressed on cytotoxic T cells) binds to the MHC, activating the co-receptor associated tyrosine kinase Lck. Lck is moved near the CD3 complex and phosphorylates the tyrosines in the immunoreceptor tyrosine-based activation motifs (ITAMS), creating a docking site for ZAP-70. The most important member of the CD3 family is CD3-zeta, to which ZAP-70 binds (hence the abbreviation). The tandem SH2-domains of ZAP-70 are engaged by the doubly phosphorylated ITAMs of CD3-zeta, which positions ZAP-70 to phosphorylate the transmembrane protein linker for activation of T cells (LAT). Phosphorylated LAT, in turn, serves as a docking site to which a number of signaling proteins bind, including the SH2-domain-containing leukocyte protein of 76 kDa (SLP-76). SLP-76 is also phosphorylated by ZAP-70, which requires its activation by Src family kinases. The final outcome of T cell activation is the transcription of several gene products which allow the T cells to differentiate, proliferate, and secrete a number of cytokines.

== Clinical significance ==
Due to its role in lymphocyte signaling, ZAP-70 has been associated with several diseases affecting lymphocytes. ZAP-70 expression is a significant indicator of the survival of lymphocytes and has been notably associated with chronic lymphocytic leukemia (CLL). CLL is a cancer that develops from overproduction of B cells in the bone marrow.

In people with CLL, higher levels of ZAP-70 confers a worse prognosis; CLL patients that are positive for the marker ZAP-70 have an average survival of 8 years, whereas those that are negative for ZAP-70 have an average survival of more than 25 years. Many patients, especially older ones, with slowly progressing disease can be reassured and may not need any treatment in their lifetimes. In individuals with CLL, higher levels of ZAP-70 is associated with a higher number of malignant B cells activated. Increased expression of ZAP-70 in B cell malignancies is correlated with increased association between malignant B cells and the immune environment, suggesting a complex role for ZAP-70 in B cell signaling.

In systemic lupus erythematosus, the Zap-70 receptor pathway is missing and the homolog Syk takes its place.

ZAP-70 deficiency results in a form of autosomal recessive immune deficiency named combined immunodeficiency. Patients afflicted with combined immunodeficiency have a normal lymphocyte count, but they have low concentrations of T helper cells and cytotoxic T cells. Patients were also found to have irregular lymphocyte proliferation responses. These effects suggest that a deficiency in ZAP-70 results in decreased rates of T cell activation and subsequent signal transductions.

== Interactions ==
ZAP-70 has been shown to interact with:

- Cbl gene,
- Drebrin-like,
- FYN,
- Lck,
- LAT,
- SHB, and
- SHC1.

== See also ==
- Lck
- Syk
- T cell receptor
- Chronic lymphocytic leukemia
- Combined immunodeficiency
