= CCNDBP1 =

Protein-coding gene in humans

Available structures
PDB	Ortholog search: PDBe RCSB
PDB	List of PDB id codes 3AY5

Identifiers
- Aliases: CCNDBP1, DIP1, GCIP, HHM, cyclin D1 binding protein 1
- External IDs: OMIM: 607089; MGI: 109595; HomoloGene: 7826; GeneCards: CCNDBP1; OMA:CCNDBP1 - orthologs

Gene location (Human)
Chr.	Chromosome 15 (human)
Band	15q15.2	Start	43,185,118 bp
Band	15q15.2	End	43,197,177 bp

Gene location (Mouse)
Chr.	Chromosome 2 (mouse)
Band	2 E5|2 60.37 cM	Start	120,838,884 bp
Band	2 E5|2 60.37 cM	End	120,847,385 bp
RNA expression pattern
Bgee	Human / Mouse (ortholog); Top expressed in: trabecular bone; mucosa of ileum; cardiac muscle tissue of right atrium; Achilles tendon; bone marrow; right uterine tube; blood; myocardium of left ventricle; placenta; skin of arm / Top expressed in: blood; zygote; secondary oocyte; primary oocyte; neural layer of retina; granulocyte; fetal liver hematopoietic progenitor cell; cerebellar cortex; cerebellar vermis; lobe of cerebellum; More reference expression data
BioGPS	n/a
Gene ontology
Molecular function	protein binding
Cellular component	nucleus; cytoplasm; nucleoplasm
Biological process	regulation of cell cycle; cell cycle
Sources:Amigo / QuickGO
Orthologs
Species	Human	Mouse
Entrez	23582	17151
Ensembl	ENSG00000166946	ENSMUSG00000023572
UniProt	O95273	Q3TVC7
RefSeq (mRNA)	NM_012142; NM_037370	NM_010761; NM_001355127
RefSeq (protein)	NP_036274	NP_034891; NP_001342056
Location (UCSC)	Chr 15: 43.19 – 43.2 Mb	Chr 2: 120.84 – 120.85 Mb
PubMed search
- Wikidata
View/Edit Human	View/Edit Mouse

Cyclin-D1-binding protein 1 is a protein that in humans is encoded by the CCNDBP1 gene.

This gene was identified by the interaction of its gene product with Grap2, a leukocyte-specific adaptor protein important for immune cell signaling. The protein encoded by this gene was shown to interact with cyclin D. Transfection of this gene in cells was reported to reduce the phosphorylation of Rb gene product by cyclin D-dependent protein kinase, and inhibit E2F1-mediated transcription activity. This protein was also found to interact with helix-loop-helix protein E12 and is thought to be a negative regulator of liver-specific gene expression. Two alternatively spliced variants, which encode distinct isoforms, have been reported.

== Interactions ==
CCNDBP1 has been shown to interact with GRAP2 and Cyclin D1.
