= PIK3R1 =

Protein-coding gene in the species Homo sapiens

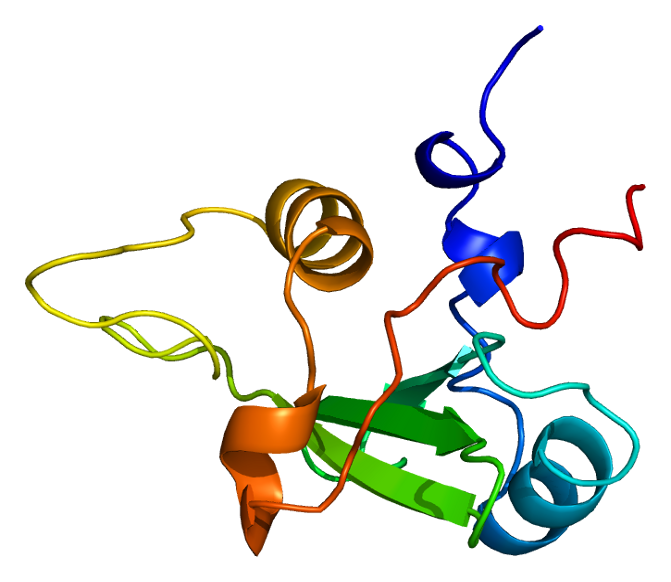

Identifiers
- Aliases: PIK3R1, AGM7, GRB1, IMD36, p85, p85-ALPHA, phosphoinositide-3-kinase regulatory subunit 1, PI3KR1
- External IDs: OMIM: 171833; MGI: 97583; GeneCards: PIK3R1
Available structures
PDB	Ortholog search: PDBe RCSB
PDB	List of PDB id codes 1A0N, 1AZG, 1H9O, 1PBW, 1PHT, 1PIC, 1PKS, 1PKT, 2IUG, 2IUH, 2IUI, 2RD0, 2V1Y, 3HHM, 3HIZ, 3I5R, 3I5S, 4A55, 4JPS, 4L1B, 4L23, 4L2Y, 4OVU, 4OVV, 4WAF, 5AUL

Gene location (Human)
Chr.	Chromosome 5 (human)
Band	5q13.1	Start	68,215,756 bp
Band	5q13.1	End	68,301,821 bp

Gene location (Mouse)
Chr.	Chromosome 13 (mouse)
Band	13 D1|13 53.92 cM	Start	101,817,071 bp
Band	13 D1|13 53.92 cM	End	101,904,725 bp
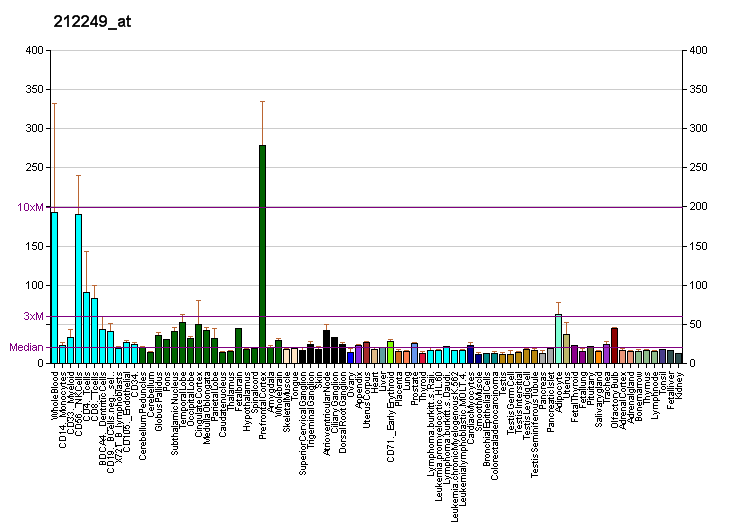

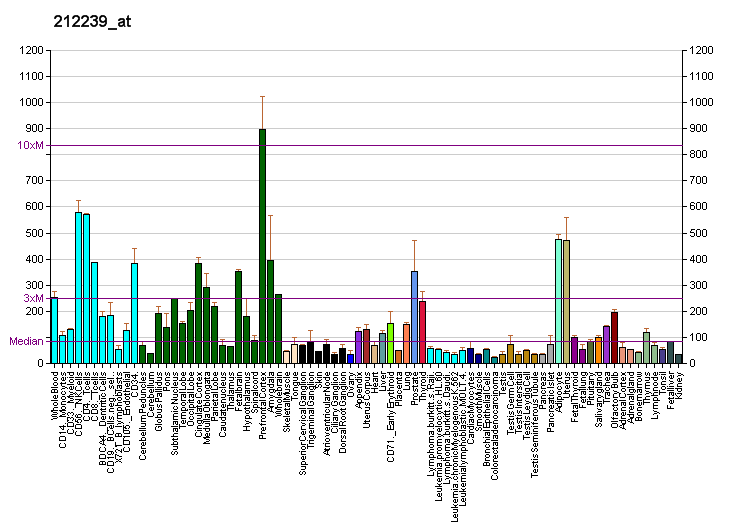

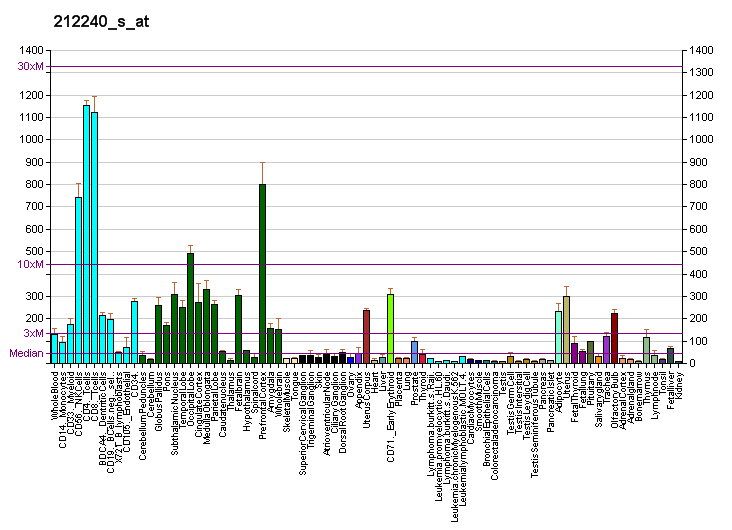
RNA expression pattern
Bgee	Human / Mouse (ortholog); Top expressed in: Achilles tendon; caput epididymis; corpus epididymis; postcentral gyrus; lactiferous duct; tail of epididymis; trigeminal ganglion; middle temporal gyrus; superior frontal gyrus; external globus pallidus / Top expressed in: lacrimal gland; molar; parotid gland; intercostal muscle; Rostral migratory stream; stroma of bone marrow; cumulus cell; genital tubercle; aortic valve; skin of external ear; More reference expression data
BioGPS	More reference expression data
Gene ontology
Molecular function	ErbB-3 class receptor binding; phosphatidylinositol 3-kinase regulator activity; insulin-like growth factor receptor binding; transmembrane receptor protein tyrosine kinase adaptor activity; insulin receptor binding; neurotrophin TRKA receptor binding; phosphatidylinositol 3-kinase regulatory subunit binding; transcription factor binding; insulin binding; phosphatidylinositol 3-kinase binding; 1-phosphatidylinositol-3-kinase regulator activity; protein binding; protein heterodimerization activity; insulin receptor substrate binding; protein phosphatase binding; 1-phosphatidylinositol-3-kinase activity; phosphatidylinositol-4,5-bisphosphate 3-kinase activity; phosphotyrosine residue binding
Cellular component	cytoplasm; cytosol; phosphatidylinositol 3-kinase complex; phosphatidylinositol 3-kinase complex, class IA; membrane; cell-cell junction; cis-Golgi network; plasma membrane; nucleus; perinuclear endoplasmic reticulum membrane; protein-containing complex
Biological process	positive regulation of glucose import; insulin-like growth factor receptor signaling pathway; negative regulation of cell adhesion; positive regulation of endoplasmic reticulum unfolded protein response; epidermal growth factor receptor signaling pathway; Fc-gamma receptor signaling pathway involved in phagocytosis; negative regulation of osteoclast differentiation; positive regulation of cell migration; cellular glucose homeostasis; cellular response to UV; T cell costimulation; protein stabilization; negative regulation of apoptotic process; response to endoplasmic reticulum stress; regulation of stress fiber assembly; negative regulation of cell-matrix adhesion; platelet activation; Fc-epsilon receptor signaling pathway; protein phosphorylation; phosphatidylinositol phosphate biosynthetic process; vascular endothelial growth factor receptor signaling pathway; growth hormone receptor signaling pathway; regulation of phosphatidylinositol 3-kinase activity; intrinsic apoptotic signaling pathway in response to DNA damage; cellular response to insulin stimulus; positive regulation of tumor necrosis factor production; positive regulation of RNA splicing; phosphatidylinositol biosynthetic process; protein transport; B cell differentiation; viral process; T cell receptor signaling pathway; extrinsic apoptotic signaling pathway via death domain receptors; phosphatidylinositol-mediated signaling; leukocyte migration; positive regulation of transcription by RNA polymerase II; signal transduction; phosphatidylinositol 3-kinase signaling; phosphatidylinositol-3-phosphate biosynthetic process; ERBB2 signaling pathway; insulin receptor signaling pathway; axon guidance; regulation of insulin receptor signaling pathway; interleukin-7-mediated signaling pathway; transport; regulation of protein localization to plasma membrane; positive regulation of protein localization to plasma membrane; G protein-coupled receptor signaling pathway; positive regulation of protein kinase B signaling; protein import into nucleus; positive regulation of phosphatidylinositol 3-kinase signaling; cytokine-mediated signaling pathway; positive regulation of protein import into nucleus
Sources:Amigo / QuickGO
Orthologs
Databases	NCBI: entry; OMA: entry
Species	Human	Mouse
Entrez	5295	18708
Ensembl	ENSG00000145675	ENSMUSG00000041417
UniProt	P27986	P26450
RefSeq (mRNA)	NM_001242466; NM_181504; NM_181523; NM_181524	NM_001024955; NM_001077495
RefSeq (protein)	NP_001229395; NP_852556; NP_852664; NP_852665	NP_001020126; NP_001070963
Location (UCSC)	Chr 5: 68.22 – 68.3 Mb	Chr 13: 101.82 – 101.9 Mb
PubMed search
- Wikidata
View/Edit Human	View/Edit Mouse

Phosphatidylinositol 3-kinase regulatory subunit alpha is an enzyme that in humans is encoded by the PIK3R1 gene.

== Function ==
Phosphatidylinositol 3-kinase phosphorylates the inositol ring of phosphatidylinositol at the 3-prime position. The enzyme comprises a 110 kD catalytic subunit and a regulatory subunit of either 85, 55, or 50 kD. The Pik3r1 gene locus encodes the 85 kD regulatory subunit, as well as 55 and 50 kD regulatory subunits. It used to be thought that alternative splicing of this gene resulted in three transcript variants encoding different isoforms. In fact, it has since been shown that the 55 and 50kD subunits have their own promotors within the gene locus Pik3r1.

Phosphatidylinositol 3-kinase plays an important role in the metabolic actions of insulin, and a mutation in this gene has been associated with insulin resistance. Suppression specifically of the 85kD subunit in early murine embryoid body development results in a transient cell-cell adhesion deficiency, mediated by transient downregulation of the adhesion molecule integrin-beta1 (ITGB1).

== Clinical significance ==
Mutations in PIK3R1 are implicated in cases of breast cancer.

Mutations in PIK3R1 are associated to SHORT syndrome.

== Interactions ==
PIK3R1 has been shown to interact with:

- ADAM12,
- BCAR1,
- CBLB,
- CD117,
- CD28,
- CD7,
- CENTG1,
- CBL,
- EPHA2,
- EPOR,
- ERBB3,
- EZR,
- FCGR2A,
- GAB1,
- GAB2,
- Grb2,
- HRAS,
- IRS1
- IRS2,
- IL1R1,
- JAK2,
- KHDRBS1,
- LTK,
- LAT,
- LCP2,
- PIK3CD,
- PTK2,
- SHB,
- TUBA1B,
- TYRO3,
- VAV1, and
- WAS.
