= Linker for activation of T cells =

Human protein and gene for T-cell signaling

LAT

Identifiers
- Aliases: LAT, Lat, LAT1, pp36, linker for activation of T-cells, IMD52, linker for activation of T cells
- External IDs: OMIM: 602354; MGI: 1342293; GeneCards: LAT

Gene location (Human)
Chr.	Chromosome 16 (human)
Band	16p11.2	Start	28,984,826 bp
Band	16p11.2	End	28,990,784 bp

Gene location (Mouse)
Chr.	Chromosome 7 (mouse)
Band	7|7 F3	Start	125,962,996 bp
Band	7|7 F3	End	125,968,742 bp
RNA expression pattern
Bgee	Human / Mouse (ortholog); Top expressed in: granulocyte; lymph node; blood; appendix; right coronary artery; spleen; popliteal artery; tibial arteries; monocyte; Descending thoracic aorta / Top expressed in: thymus; mesenteric lymph nodes; blood; spleen; subcutaneous adipose tissue; Ileal epithelium; embryo; bone marrow; pharynx; morula; More reference expression data
BioGPS	n/a
Gene ontology
Molecular function	protein binding; protein kinase binding
Cellular component	integral component of membrane; membrane; cell-cell junction; mast cell granule; immunological synapse; membrane raft; COP9 signalosome; Golgi apparatus; plasma membrane
Biological process	intracellular signal transduction; adaptive immune response; gene expression; homeostasis of number of cells; regulation of T cell activation; immune system process; lymphocyte homeostasis; MAPK cascade; Fc-epsilon receptor signaling pathway; immune response; integrin-mediated signaling pathway; mast cell degranulation; inflammatory response; T cell receptor signaling pathway; T cell activation; calcium-mediated signaling; signal transduction; positive regulation of protein kinase activity; Ras protein signal transduction; positive regulation of signal transduction
Sources:Amigo / QuickGO
Orthologs
Databases	NCBI: entry; OMA: entry
Species	Human	Mouse
Entrez	27040	16797
Ensembl	ENSG00000213658	ENSMUSG00000030742
UniProt	O43561	O54957
RefSeq (mRNA)	NM_001014987; NM_001014988; NM_001014989; NM_014387	NM_010689
RefSeq (protein)	NP_001014987; NP_001014988; NP_001014989; NP_055202	NP_034819
Location (UCSC)	Chr 16: 28.98 – 28.99 Mb	Chr 7: 125.96 – 125.97 Mb
PubMed search
- Wikidata
View/Edit Human	View/Edit Mouse

The Linker for activation of T cells, also known as linker of activated T cells or LAT, is a protein involved in the T-cell antigen receptor signal transduction pathway which in humans is encoded by the LAT gene. Alternative splicing results in multiple transcript variants encoding different isoforms.

== Function ==
The LAT protein encoded by the gene of the same name, plays a key role in the diversification of T cell signaling pathways following activation of the T-cell antigen receptor (TCR) signal transduction pathway, which is first catalyzed by TCR binding to MHC class II. LAT is a transmembrane protein localizes to lipid rafts (also known as glycosphingolipid-enriched microdomains or GEMs) and acts as a docking site for SH2 domain-containing proteins. Upon phosphorylation, this protein recruits multiple adaptor proteins and downstream signaling molecules into multimolecular signaling complexes located near the site of TCR engagement. In mouse thymocytes, lack of functional LAT or the inability for LAT to be phosphorylated leads to complete lack of T cell development. Moreover, mutation and deletion of LAT hampers overall TCR mediated T cell response.

== Signaling Pathway ==
Prior to phosphorylation of LAT, the TCR signal transduction pathway is initiated by a TCR interacting with peptide bound MHC, and immediately leads to the activation of LCK and Fyn, which are members of the Src family of kinases. Activated LCK subsequently phosphorylates the immunoreceptor tyrosine-based activation motifs (ITAMs) of the T-cell surface glycoprotein CD3 zeta chain, which is a protein associated with the TCR complex, in two specific locations. The phosphorylated ITAMs of the CD3 zeta chain allows for ZAP-70, a Syk family protein tyrosine kinase, to bind, become activated, and phosphorylate LAT.

ZAP-70 phosphorylates tyrosines on LAT, specifically tyrosines 171, 191, and 226 is able to interact with adaptor proteins that have a SH2 domain, and are members of the Grb2 protein family, such as Gads. Moreover, phosphorylation of LAT tyrosine 132 allows for PLCγ1-LAT association, which, when combined with concurrent Gads binding to tyrosines 171 or 191 of LAT, allows for the formation of a LAT-nucleated signaling complex. LAT-interacting Gads attracts the binding of SLP-76, which recruits additional effector molecules that assist in the stabilization of PLCγ1 binding to the LAT complex. The resulting LAT signaling complex, which contains the molecules PLCγ1, Grb2, Gads, SLP-76 and the necessary associated ligands thus allow for diversification of the TCR signaling pathway through actin production, the activation of transcription factors, and other messaging signals.

== Discovery ==
LAT was described in the early 1990s as a phosphoprotein of 36–38 kDa (pp. 36–38) rapidly phosphorylated on tyrosine residues following TCR ligation. Cloning of the gene revealed that the protein product is a type III (leaderless) transmembrane protein of 262 aminoacids (long form) or 233 aminoacids (short form) in humans, 242 aminoacids in mouse, and 241 aminoacids in rat.

== Interactions ==
The Linker for Activation of T cells has been shown to interact with:

- GRAP2,
- GRAP,
- Grb2,
- ITK,
- MAP4K1
- PIK3R1,
- PLCG1,
- SHB,
- VAV1, and
- ZAP-70.
