= Soquelitinib =

Identifiers
- IUPAC name: N-[5-[4-methoxy-2-methyl-5-[(3R)-3-methyl-4-prop-2-enoyl-1,4-diazepane-1-carbonyl]phenyl]sulfanyl-1,3-thiazol-2-yl]cyclopropanecarboxamide
- CAS Number: 2226636-04-8
- PubChem CID: 134517711
- DrugBank: DB18749
- ChemSpider: 129629996
- UNII: 6I5H17AN3I
- KEGG: D12762

Chemical and physical data
- Formula: C_{25}H_{30}N_{4}O_{4}S_{2}
- Molar mass: 514.66 g·mol^{−1}
- 3D model (JSmol): Interactive image
- SMILES: C[C@@H]1CN(CCCN1C(=O)C=C)C(=O)C2=C(C=C(C(=C2)SC3=CN=C(S3)NC(=O)C4CC4)C)OC
- InChI: InChI=1S/C25H30N4O4S2/c1-5-21(30)29-10-6-9-28(14-16(29)3)24(32)18-12-20(15(2)11-19(18)33-4)34-22-13-26-25(35-22)27-23(31)17-7-8-17/h5,11-13,16-17H,1,6-10,14H2,2-4H3,(H,26,27,31)/t16-/m1/s1; Key:KNCWSXRTKLTULH-MRXNPFEDSA-N

Soquelitinib (CPI-818) is an experimental drug which acts as a selective inhibitor of the enzyme interleukin-2-inducible T-cell kinase (ITK). It is in clinical trials for the treatment of T-cell lymphoma.
