= ITK (gene) =

Protein-coding gene in the species Homo sapiens

Identifiers
- Aliases: ITK, EMT, LPFS1, LYK, PSCTK2, IL2 inducible T-cell kinase, IL2 inducible T cell kinase
- External IDs: OMIM: 186973; MGI: 96621; GeneCards: ITK
Available structures
PDB	Ortholog search: PDBe RCSB
PDB	List of PDB id codes 1SM2, 1SNU, 1SNX, 2E6I, 2LMJ, 2YUQ, 3MIY, 3MJ1, 3MJ2, 3QGW, 3QGY, 3T9T, 3V5J, 3V5L, 3V8T, 3V8W, 4HCT, 4HCU, 4HCV, 4KIO, 4L7S, 4M0Y, 4M0Z, 4M12, 4M13, 4M14, 4M15, 4MF0, 4MF1, 4PP9, 4PPA, 4PPB, 4PPC, 4PQN, 4QD6, 4RFM
Enzyme activity
EC #	BRENDA	ExPASy	KEGG	MetaCyc
2.7.10.2	↗	↗	↗	↗

Gene location (Human)
Chr.	Chromosome 5 (human)
Band	5q33.3	Start	157,142,933 bp
Band	5q33.3	End	157,255,185 bp

Gene location (Mouse)
Chr.	Chromosome 11 (mouse)
Band	11 B1.1|11 27.75 cM	Start	46,215,977 bp
Band	11 B1.1|11 27.75 cM	End	46,280,342 bp
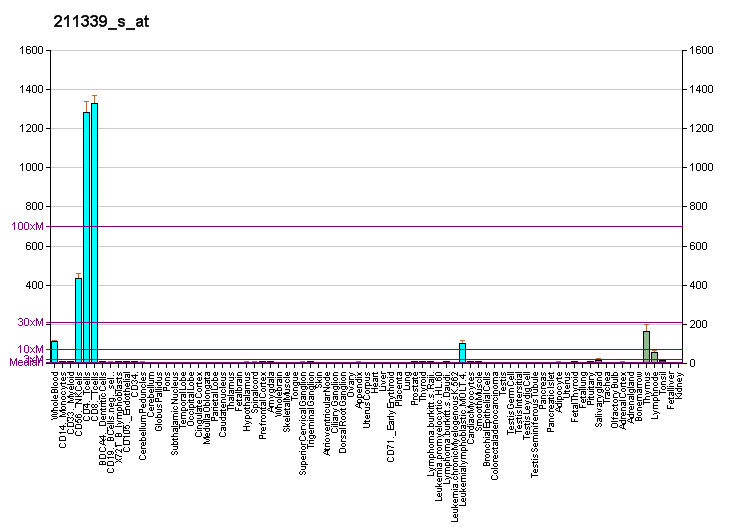
RNA expression pattern
Bgee	Human / Mouse (ortholog); Top expressed in: granulocyte; thymus; blood; lymph node; appendix; spleen; epithelium of colon; bone marrow cell; superficial temporal artery; gallbladder / Top expressed in: thymus; mesenteric lymph nodes; blood; spleen; granulocyte; submandibular gland; subcutaneous adipose tissue; perirhinal cortex; entorhinal cortex; Ileal epithelium; More reference expression data
BioGPS	More reference expression data
Gene ontology
Molecular function	transferase activity; nucleotide binding; protein kinase activity; non-membrane spanning protein tyrosine kinase activity; metal ion binding; kinase activity; protein binding; protein tyrosine kinase activity; signaling receptor binding; ATP binding
Cellular component	cytoplasm; cytosol; cell-cell junction; extrinsic component of cytoplasmic side of plasma membrane; nucleus
Biological process	intracellular signal transduction; adaptive immune response; phosphorylation; NK T cell differentiation; transmembrane receptor protein tyrosine kinase signaling pathway; immune system process; cytokine production; activation of phospholipase C activity; Fc-epsilon receptor signaling pathway; protein phosphorylation; cellular defense response; regulation of cell population proliferation; peptidyl-tyrosine autophosphorylation; T cell receptor signaling pathway; T cell activation; signal transduction; interleukin-4 production; innate immune response; B cell receptor signaling pathway
Sources:Amigo / QuickGO
Orthologs
Databases	NCBI: entry; OMA: entry
Species	Human	Mouse
Entrez	3702	16428
Ensembl	ENSG00000113263	ENSMUSG00000020395
UniProt	Q08881	Q03526
RefSeq (mRNA)	NM_005546	NM_001281965; NM_001281966; NM_001281967; NM_001281968; NM_010583
RefSeq (protein)	NP_005537	NP_001268894; NP_001268895; NP_001268896; NP_001268897; NP_034713
Location (UCSC)	Chr 5: 157.14 – 157.26 Mb	Chr 11: 46.22 – 46.28 Mb
PubMed search
- Wikidata
View/Edit Human	View/Edit Mouse

Tyrosine-protein kinase ITK/TSK also known as interleukin-2-inducible T-cell kinase or simply ITK, is a protein that in humans is encoded by the ITK gene. ITK is a member of the TEC family of kinases and is highly expressed in T cells.

== Function ==
This gene encodes an intracellular tyrosine kinase expressed in T-cells. The protein is thought to play a role in T-cell proliferation and differentiation. ITK is functionally important for the development and effector function of T_{h}2 and T_{h}17 cells.

Mice lacking ITK were shown to not be susceptible to asthma.

== Structure ==
This protein contains the following domains, which are often found in intracellular kinases:

- N-terminus – PH (pleckstrin homology domain)
- TH – Tec family homology domain (including Bruton's tyrosine kinase Cys-rich motif and Proline rich region)
- SH3 – (Src homology 3)
- SH2 – (Src homology 2)
- C-terminus – tyrosine kinase, catalytic domain

== Interactions ==
ITK (gene) has been shown to interact with:

- FYN,
- Grb2 and
- KHDRBS1,
- KPNA2,
- LAT,
- LCP2,
- PLCG1,
- PPIA, and
- WAS.

== Inhibitors ==
- Soquelitinib (CPI-818)
