= GRB2 =

Protein-coding gene in the species Homo sapiens

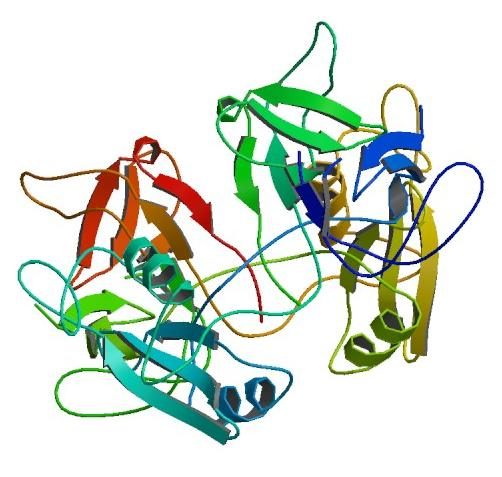

Identifiers
- Aliases: GRB2, ASH, EGFRBP-Grb3-3, MST084, MSTP084, NCKAP2, growth factor receptor bound protein 2
- External IDs: OMIM: 108355; MGI: 95805; GeneCards: GRB2
Available structures
PDB	Ortholog search: PDBe RCSB
PDB	List of PDB id codes 1AZE, 1BM2, 1BMB, 1CJ1, 1FHS, 1FYR, 1GCQ, 1GFC, 1GFD, 1GHU, 1GRI, 1IO6, 1JYQ, 1JYR, 1JYU, 1QG1, 1TZE, 1X0N, 1ZFP, 2AOA, 2AOB, 2H5K, 2HUW, 2VVK, 2VWF, 2W0Z, 3C7I, 3IMD, 3IMJ, 3IN7, 3IN8, 3KFJ, 3MXC, 3MXY, 3N7Y, 3N84, 3N8M, 3OV1, 3OVE, 3S8L, 3S8N, 3S8O, 2H46, 3WA4, 4P9V, 4P9Z, 5CDW

Gene location (Human)
Chr.	Chromosome 17 (human)
Band	17q25.1	Start	75,318,076 bp
Band	17q25.1	End	75,405,709 bp

Gene location (Mouse)
Chr.	Chromosome 11 (mouse)
Band	11 E2|11 80.91 cM	Start	115,534,871 bp
Band	11 E2|11 80.91 cM	End	115,599,423 bp
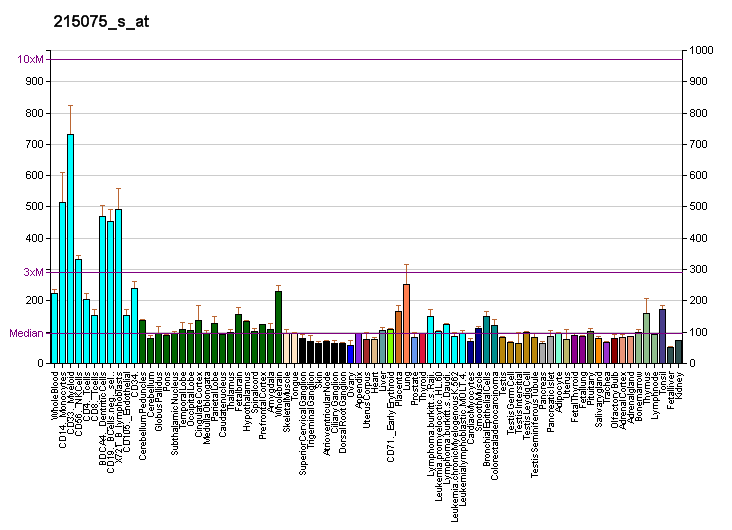
RNA expression pattern
Bgee	Human / Mouse (ortholog); Top expressed in: monocyte; blood; superficial temporal artery; granulocyte; lymph node; lower lobe of lung; epithelium of nasopharynx; ganglionic eminence; spleen; tonsil / Top expressed in: granulocyte; superior frontal gyrus; dentate gyrus of hippocampal formation granule cell; primary visual cortex; cerebellar cortex; ventricular zone; blood; muscle of thigh; lip; neural layer of retina; More reference expression data
BioGPS	More reference expression data
Gene ontology
Molecular function	protein domain specific binding; SH3 domain binding; protein kinase binding; identical protein binding; neurotrophin TRKA receptor binding; protein phosphatase binding; protein binding; ephrin receptor binding; insulin receptor substrate binding; epidermal growth factor receptor binding; phosphatidylinositol-4,5-bisphosphate 3-kinase activity; 1-phosphatidylinositol-3-kinase activity; phosphoprotein binding; enzyme binding; RNA binding; non-membrane spanning protein tyrosine kinase activity; phosphotyrosine residue binding
Cellular component	extracellular exosome; nucleolus; cytoplasm; nucleoplasm; COP9 signalosome; Golgi apparatus; cytosol; nucleus; cell-cell junction; membrane; Grb2-EGFR complex; endosome; vesicle membrane; plasma membrane; extrinsic component of cytoplasmic side of plasma membrane; protein-containing complex; intracellular anatomical structure
Biological process	T cell costimulation; Fc-gamma receptor signaling pathway involved in phagocytosis; branching involved in labyrinthine layer morphogenesis; MAPK cascade; epidermal growth factor receptor signaling pathway; fibroblast growth factor receptor signaling pathway; insulin receptor signaling pathway; receptor internalization; cell-cell signaling; axon guidance; positive regulation of reactive oxygen species metabolic process; cellular response to ionizing radiation; Fc-epsilon receptor signaling pathway; viral process; positive regulation of actin filament polymerization; signal transduction in response to DNA damage; negative regulation of epidermal growth factor receptor signaling pathway; leukocyte migration; regulation of MAPK cascade; anatomical structure formation involved in morphogenesis; ageing; ERBB2 signaling pathway; phosphatidylinositol phosphate biosynthetic process; phosphatidylinositol-3-phosphate biosynthetic process; protein heterooligomerization; entry of bacterium into host cell; membrane organization; cell migration; cell differentiation; peptidyl-tyrosine autophosphorylation; regulation of cell population proliferation; innate immune response; Ras protein signal transduction; interleukin-15-mediated signaling pathway; positive regulation of protein kinase B signaling; regulation of molecular function; cytokine-mediated signaling pathway; positive regulation of Ras protein signal transduction; neurotrophin TRK receptor signaling pathway
Sources:Amigo / QuickGO
Orthologs
Databases	NCBI: entry; OMA: entry
Species	Human	Mouse
Entrez	2885	14784
Ensembl	ENSG00000177885	ENSMUSG00000059923
UniProt	P62993	Q60631
RefSeq (mRNA)	NM_203506; NM_002086	NM_008163; NM_001313936; NM_001313937
RefSeq (protein)	NP_002077; NP_987102	NP_001300865; NP_001300866; NP_032189
Location (UCSC)	Chr 17: 75.32 – 75.41 Mb	Chr 11: 115.53 – 115.6 Mb
PubMed search
- Wikidata
View/Edit Human	View/Edit Mouse

Growth factor receptor-bound protein 2, also known as Grb2, is an adaptor protein involved in signal transduction/cell communication. In humans, the GRB2 protein is encoded by the GRB2 gene.

The protein encoded by this gene binds receptors such as the epidermal growth factor receptor and contains one SH2 domain and two SH3 domains. Its two SH3 domains direct complex formation with proline-rich regions of other proteins, and its SH2 domain binds tyrosine phosphorylated sequences. This gene is similar to the sem-5 gene of Caenorhabditis elegans, which is involved in the signal transduction pathway. Two alternatively spliced transcript variants encoding different isoforms have been found for this gene.

== Function and expression ==
Grb2 is widely expressed and is essential for multiple cellular functions. Inhibition of Grb2 function impairs developmental processes in various organisms and blocks transformation and proliferation of various cell types. It is thus not surprising that targeted gene disruption of Grb2 in mice is lethal at an early embryonic stage. Grb2 is best known for its ability to link the epidermal growth factor receptor tyrosine kinase to the activation of Ras and its downstream kinases, ERK1,2. Grb2 is composed of an SH2 domain flanked on each side by an SH3 domain. Grb2 has two closely related proteins with similar domain organizations, Gads and Grap. Gads and Grap are expressed specifically in hematopoietic cells and function in the coordination of tyrosine kinase mediated signal transduction.

== Domains ==
The SH2 domain of Grb2 binds to phosphorylated tyrosine-containing peptides on receptors or scaffold proteins with a preference for pY-X-N-X, where X is generally a hydrophobic residue such as valine (see ).

The N-terminal SH3 domain binds to proline-rich peptides and can bind to the Ras-guanine exchange factor SOS.

The C-terminal SH3 domain binds to peptides conforming to a P-X-I/L/V/-D/N-R-X-X-K-P motif that allows it to specifically bind to proteins such as Gab-1.

== Interactions ==
Grb2 has been shown to interact with:

- ADAM15,
- Abl gene,
- Arachidonate 5-lipoxygenase,
- B-cell linker,
- BCAR1,
- BCR gene,
- Beta-2 adrenergic receptor,
- C-Met,
- CBLB,
- CD117,
- CD22,
- CD28,
- CDKN1B,
- CRK,
- Cbl gene,
- Colony stimulating factor 1 receptor,
- DCTN1,
- DNM1,
- Dock180,
- Dystroglycan,
- EPH receptor A2,
- ETV6,
- Epidermal growth factor receptor,
- Erythropoietin receptor,
- FRS2,
- Fas ligand,
- GAB1,
- GAB2,
- Glycoprotein 130,
- Granulocyte colony-stimulating factor receptor,
- HER2/neu,
- HNRNPC,
- Huntingtin,
- INPP5D,
- IRS1,
- ITK,
- Janus kinase 1,
- Janus kinase 2,
- KHDRBS1,
- Linker of activated T cells,
- Lymphocyte cytosolic protein 2,
- MAP2,
- MAP3K1
- MAP4K1,
- MED28,
- MST1R,
- MUC1,
- Mitogen-activated protein kinase 9,
- NCKIPSD,
- NEU3,
- PDGFRB,
- PIK3R1,
- PLCG1,
- PRKAR1A,
- PTK2,
- PTPN11,
- PTPN12,
- PTPN1,
- PTPN6,
- PTPRA,
- RAPGEF1,
- RET proto-oncogene,
- SH2B1,
- SH3KBP1,
- SHC1,
- SOS1,
- Src,
- Syk,
- TNK2,
- TrkA,
- VAV1,
- VAV2,
- VAV3, and
- Wiskott-Aldrich syndrome protein.

== See also ==
- MAPK/ERK pathway
