= SH2 domain-containing adapter protein B =

Protein-coding gene in the species Homo sapiens

SHB

Identifiers
- Aliases: SHB, bA3J10.2, SH2 domain containing adaptor protein B
- External IDs: OMIM: 600314; MGI: 98294; GeneCards: SHB

Gene location (Human)
Chr.	Chromosome 9 (human)
Band	9p13.1	Start	37,915,898 bp
Band	9p13.1	End	38,069,227 bp

Gene location (Mouse)
Chr.	Chromosome 4 (mouse)
Band	4|4 B1	Start	45,423,278 bp
Band	4|4 B1	End	45,532,470 bp
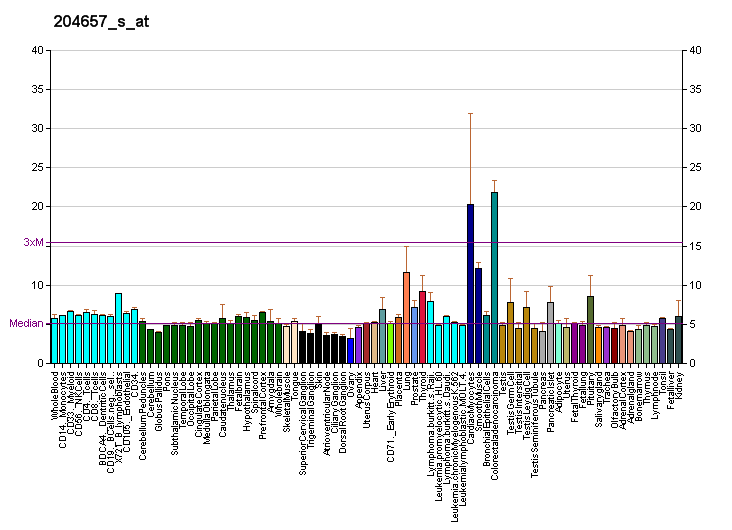

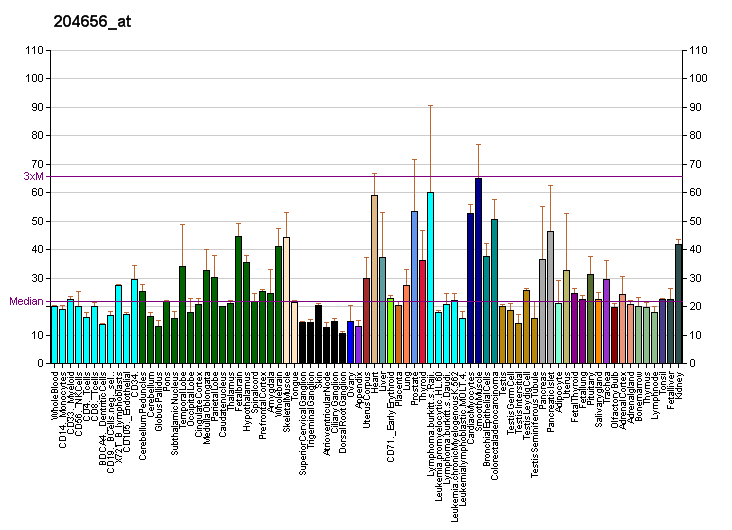
RNA expression pattern
Bgee	Human / Mouse (ortholog); Top expressed in: parotid gland; gingival epithelium; germinal epithelium; amniotic fluid; ganglionic eminence; retinal pigment epithelium; cartilage tissue; hair follicle; parietal pleura; palpebral conjunctiva / Top expressed in: gastrula; decidua; ganglionic eminence; zygote; esophagus; molar; lip; secondary oocyte; medial ganglionic eminence; left lobe of liver; More reference expression data
BioGPS	More reference expression data
Gene ontology
Molecular function	phosphotyrosine residue binding; protein binding
Cellular component	cytoplasm; plasma membrane; membrane; nucleoplasm; cytosol; cytoplasmic ribonucleoprotein granule
Biological process	multicellular organism development; cell differentiation; vascular endothelial growth factor receptor signaling pathway; angiogenesis; apoptotic process; positive regulation of signal transduction; signal transduction
Sources:Amigo / QuickGO
Orthologs
Databases	NCBI: entry; OMA: entry
Species	Human	Mouse
Entrez	6461	230126
Ensembl	ENSG00000107338	ENSMUSG00000044813
UniProt	Q15464	Q6PD21
RefSeq (mRNA)	NM_003028	NM_001033306
RefSeq (protein)	NP_003019	NP_001028478
Location (UCSC)	Chr 9: 37.92 – 38.07 Mb	Chr 4: 45.42 – 45.53 Mb
PubMed search
- Wikidata
View/Edit Human	View/Edit Mouse

SH2 domain-containing adapter protein B is a protein that in humans is encoded by the SHB gene.

== Interactions ==
SHB (gene) has been shown to interact with:

- EPS8,
- Fibroblast growth factor receptor 1,
- Linker of activated T cells,
- Lymphocyte cytosolic protein 2,
- PIK3R1,
- Src,
- VAV1, and
- ZAP-70.
