= Lymphocyte cytosolic protein 2 =

Protein-coding gene in the species Homo sapiens

LCP2
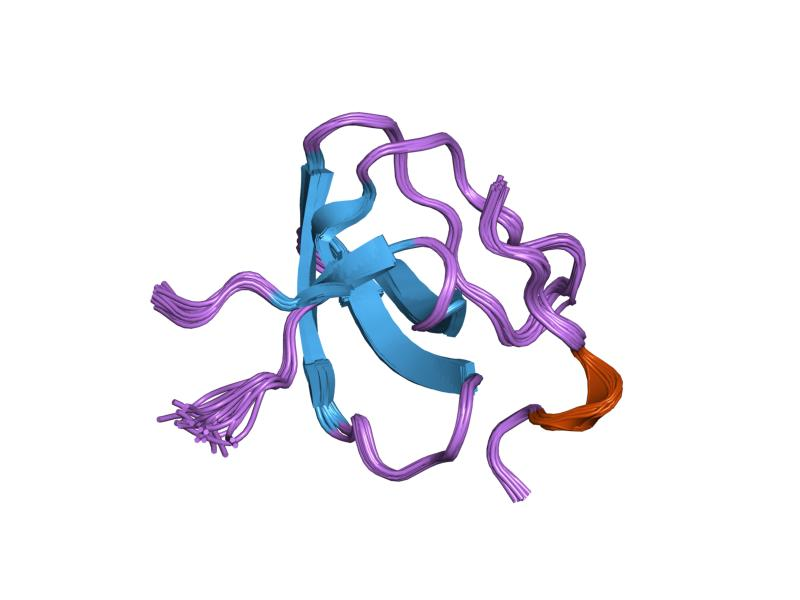

Identifiers
- Aliases: LCP2, SLP-76, SLP76, lymphocyte cytosolic protein 2, IMD81
- External IDs: OMIM: 601603; MGI: 1321402; GeneCards: LCP2
Available structures
| PDB | Ortholog search: PDBe RCSB |
| PDB | List of PDB id codes 1H3H, 1YWO, 2EAP, 2ROR |

Gene location (Human)
| Chr. | Chromosome 5 (human) |
| Band | 5q35.1 | Start | 170,246,233 bp |
| Band | 5q35.1 | End | 170,297,815 bp |

Gene location (Mouse)
| Chr. | Chromosome 11 (mouse) |
| Band | 11|11 A4 | Start | 33,996,920 bp |
| Band | 11|11 A4 | End | 34,042,295 bp |
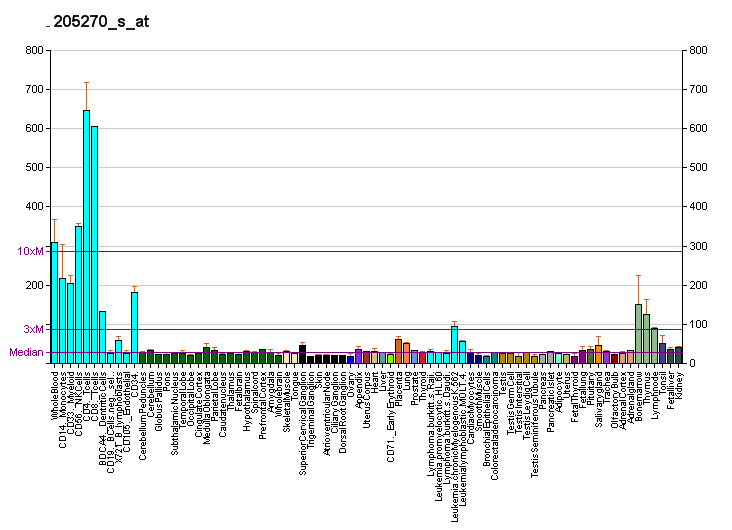

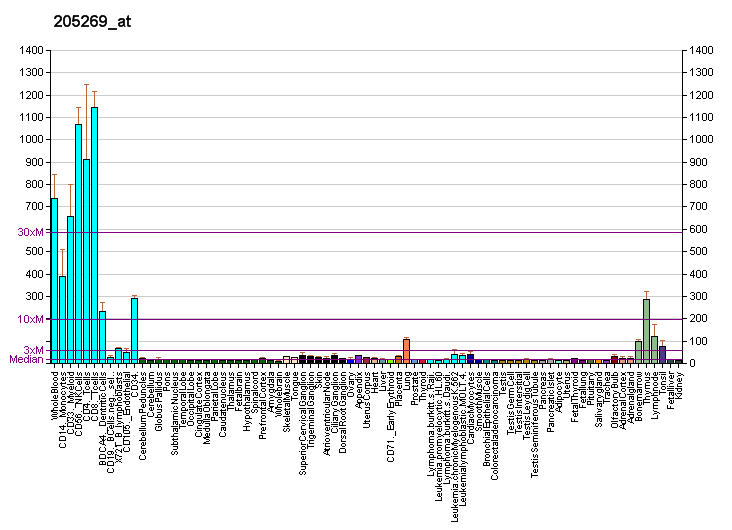
RNA expression pattern
| Bgee | Human / Mouse (ortholog); Top expressed in: monocyte; granulocyte; blood; bone marrow cell; spleen; appendix; lymph node; upper lobe of left lung; gallbladder; thymus / Top expressed in: granulocyte; thymus; stroma of bone marrow; mesenteric lymph nodes; spleen; blood; zygote; tibiofemoral joint; secondary oocyte; body of femur; More reference expression data |
| BioGPS | More reference expression data |
Gene ontology
| Molecular function | protein binding |
| Cellular component | cytoplasm; cytosol; TCR signalosome; cell-cell junction; plasma membrane raft |
| Biological process | platelet activation; mast cell activation; Fc-epsilon receptor signaling pathway; positive regulation of protein kinase activity; intracellular signal transduction; T cell receptor signaling pathway; immune response; transmembrane receptor protein tyrosine kinase signaling pathway |
Sources:Amigo / QuickGO
Orthologs
| Databases | NCBI: entry; OMA: entry |
| Species | Human | Mouse |
| Entrez | 3937 | 16822 |
| Ensembl | ENSG00000043462 | ENSMUSG00000002699 |
| UniProt | Q13094 | Q60787 |
| RefSeq (mRNA) | NM_005565 | NM_010696 |
| RefSeq (protein) | NP_005556 | NP_034826 |
| Location (UCSC) | Chr 5: 170.25 – 170.3 Mb | Chr 11: 34 – 34.04 Mb |
| PubMed search |
- Wikidata
| View/Edit Human | View/Edit Mouse |

Lymphocyte cytosolic protein 2 (SH2 domain containing leukocyte protein of 76kDa), also known as LCP2 or SLP-76, is a signal-transducing adaptor protein expressed in T cells and myeloid cells and is important in the signaling of T-cell receptors (TCRs). As an adaptor protein, SLP-76 does not have catalytic functions, primarily binding other signaling proteins to form larger signaling complexes. It is a key component of the signaling pathways of receptors with immunoreceptor tyrosine-based activation motifs (ITAMs) such as T-cell receptors, its precursors, and receptors for the Fc regions of certain antibodies. SLP-76 is expressed in T-cells and related lymphocytes like natural killer cells.

== Structure and function ==
The amino acid sequence of the protein has a central domain with a high concentration of prolines, as well as domains at the amino-terminal and carboxy-terminal of the amino acid sequence. The PDB file 1H3H depicts the SH3 domain of GRAP2 in complex with an RSTK-containing peptide representing residues 226–235 of SLP-76. The human and murine cDNAs both encode 533 amino acid proteins that are 72% identical and composed of three modular domains. The central domain binds SRC-Homology 3 (SH3) domains of other adaptor molecules such as Grb2 and Gads. The N-terminus has an acidic region with sections for SH2-domain binding and tyrosine residues that bind the proteins Vav and Nck when phosphorylated. The C-terminus region is itself a SH2 domain and binds FYB among other proteins. SLP-76 is triggered when the TCR binds its ligand by the phosphorylation of tyrosines on the N-terminus by ZAP-70, a tyrosine kinase. Along with the LAT (linker for activation of T cells) adaptor protein, SLP-76 is essential to nearly all downstream effects from T-cell receptor signals. SLP-76, LAT, and Gads together combine into protein complexes, typically with LAT at the center and SLP-76 proteins on the outside. These complexes associate into larger microclusters that activate a multitude of signaling pathways. The proteins that bind SLP-76 are essential to the production and secretion of interleukin 2 (IL-2) and rearrangement of the actin cytoskeleton in T-cells, which is an important part of T-cell division and proliferation.

Studies using SLP-76-deficient T cell lines or mice have provided strong evidence that SLP-76 plays a positive role more generally in promoting T cell development and activation, as well as mast cell and platelet function. SLP-76 is critical in the signaling from the pre-TCR that shifts T-cell developing thymocytes from the double-negative (DN) stage to the double-positive (DP) stage. Allelic exclusion of the second locus of the TCRβ chain is also dependent on signaling from the TCRβ chain that is first expressed, involving SLP-76 as a key intermediate.

SLP-76 is also important in natural killer (NK) cells, in the signaling pathways of the NK cell receptors (NKRs). The SH2 domain on the C-terminus binds HPK-1, a serine-threonine kinase, and the adhesion and degranulation-promoting adaptor protein (ADAP) also known as FYB. Both these proteins are common to regular T-cells as well, but have unique downstream signaling effects in NK cells relating to their distribution across different tissues. Studies using mutations in the SH2 domain of mice show that it produces an accumulation of invariant NK cells in primary lymphoid organs like the thymus and in peripheral lymph nodes, with a simultaneous reduction of these cells in the livers and spleens.

== Interactions ==
Lymphocyte cytosolic protein 2 has been shown to interact with:

- Cbl gene,
- GRAP2,
- Grb2,
- ITK
- LYN,
- NCK1,
- PIK3R1,
- PLCG1,
- PTPN6,
- SHB, and
- VAV1.

== See also ==
- Activation
