= VAV1 =

Human protein and coding gene

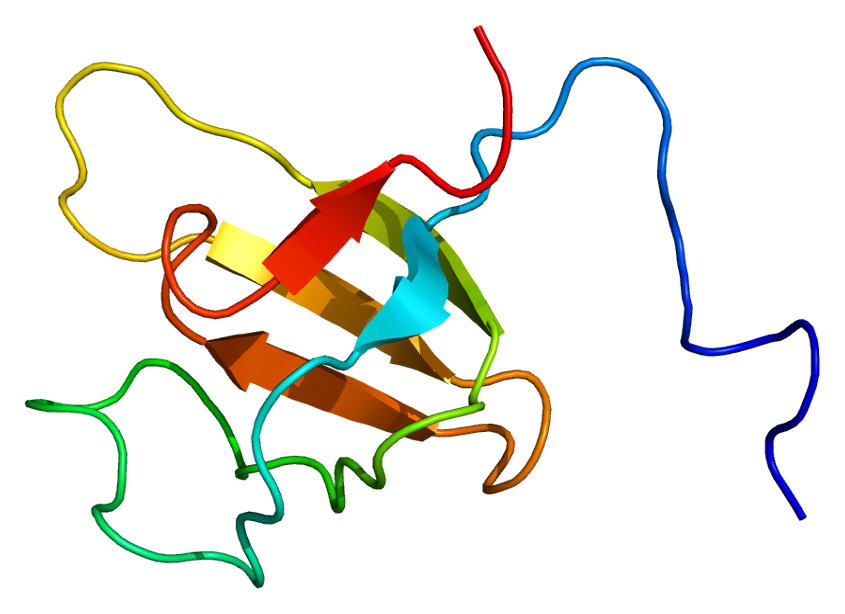

Identifiers
- Aliases: VAV1, VAV, vav guanine nucleotide exchange factor 1
- External IDs: OMIM: 164875; MGI: 98923; GeneCards: VAV1
Available structures
PDB	Ortholog search: PDBe RCSB
PDB	List of PDB id codes 2CRH, 2LCT, 2MC1, 2ROR, 3BJI, 3KY9

Gene location (Human)
Chr.	Chromosome 19 (human)
Band	19p13.3	Start	6,772,708 bp
Band	19p13.3	End	6,857,366 bp

Gene location (Mouse)
Chr.	Chromosome 17 (mouse)
Band	17 D|17 29.76 cM	Start	57,586,100 bp
Band	17 D|17 29.76 cM	End	57,635,031 bp
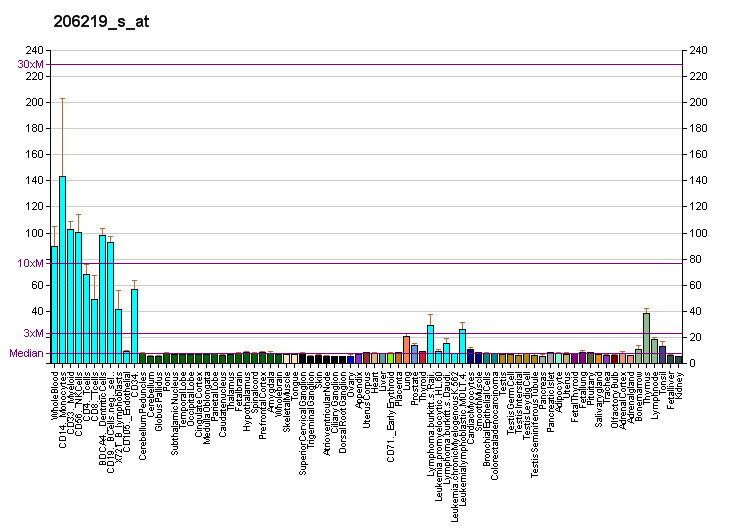
RNA expression pattern
Bgee	Human / Mouse (ortholog); Top expressed in: granulocyte; monocyte; blood; spleen; bone marrow cell; lymph node; appendix; palpebral conjunctiva; epithelium of nasopharynx; trabecular bone / Top expressed in: superior surface of tongue; gallbladder; granulocyte; thymus; mesenteric lymph nodes; interventricular septum; spleen; blood; gastrula; lumbar subsegment of spinal cord; More reference expression data
BioGPS	More reference expression data
Gene ontology
Molecular function	guanyl-nucleotide exchange factor activity; DNA-binding transcription factor activity; metal ion binding; protein binding; phosphatidylinositol-4,5-bisphosphate 3-kinase activity; phosphotyrosine residue binding
Cellular component	cytosol; cell-cell junction; plasma membrane
Biological process	regulation of cell size; intracellular signal transduction; Fc-gamma receptor signaling pathway involved in phagocytosis; regulation of GTPase activity; T cell costimulation; neutrophil chemotaxis; reactive oxygen species metabolic process; platelet activation; Fc-epsilon receptor signaling pathway; positive regulation of GTPase activity; T cell differentiation; vascular endothelial growth factor receptor signaling pathway; immune response; phagocytosis; positive regulation of apoptotic process; integrin-mediated signaling pathway; regulation of Rho protein signal transduction; regulation of small GTPase mediated signal transduction; positive regulation of natural killer cell mediated cytotoxicity; T cell activation; positive regulation of cell adhesion; regulation of transcription, DNA-templated; phosphatidylinositol phosphate biosynthetic process; small GTPase mediated signal transduction; G protein-coupled receptor signaling pathway; positive regulation of protein kinase B signaling; cytokine-mediated signaling pathway; positive regulation of Ras protein signal transduction
Sources:Amigo / QuickGO
Orthologs
Databases	NCBI: entry; OMA: entry
Species	Human	Mouse
Entrez	7409	22324
Ensembl	ENSG00000141968	ENSMUSG00000034116
UniProt	P15498	P27870
RefSeq (mRNA)	NM_001258206; NM_001258207; NM_005428	NM_001163815; NM_001163816; NM_011691
RefSeq (protein)	NP_001245135; NP_001245136; NP_005419	NP_001157287; NP_001157288; NP_035821
Location (UCSC)	Chr 19: 6.77 – 6.86 Mb	Chr 17: 57.59 – 57.64 Mb
PubMed search
- Wikidata
View/Edit Human	View/Edit Mouse

Proto-oncogene vav is a protein that in humans is encoded by the VAV1 gene.

== Function ==
The protein encoded by this proto-oncogene is a member of the Dbl family of guanine nucleotide exchange factors (GEF) for the Rho family of GTP binding proteins. The protein is important in hematopoiesis, playing a role in T-cell and B-cell development and activation. This particular GEF has been identified as the specific binding partner of Nef proteins from HIV-1. Coexpression and binding of these partners initiates profound morphological changes, cytoskeletal rearrangements and the JNK/SAPK signaling cascade, leading to increased levels of viral transcription and replication.

== Interactions ==
VAV1 has been shown to interact with:

- ARHGDIB,
- Abl gene,
- Cbl gene
- EZH2,
- Grb2,
- JAK2,
- Ku70,
- LAT,
- LCP2,
- MAPK1,
- PIK3R1,
- PLCG1,
- PRKCQ,
- S100B,
- SHB,
- SIAH2, and
- Syk.
