= SH2 domain =

Protein domain

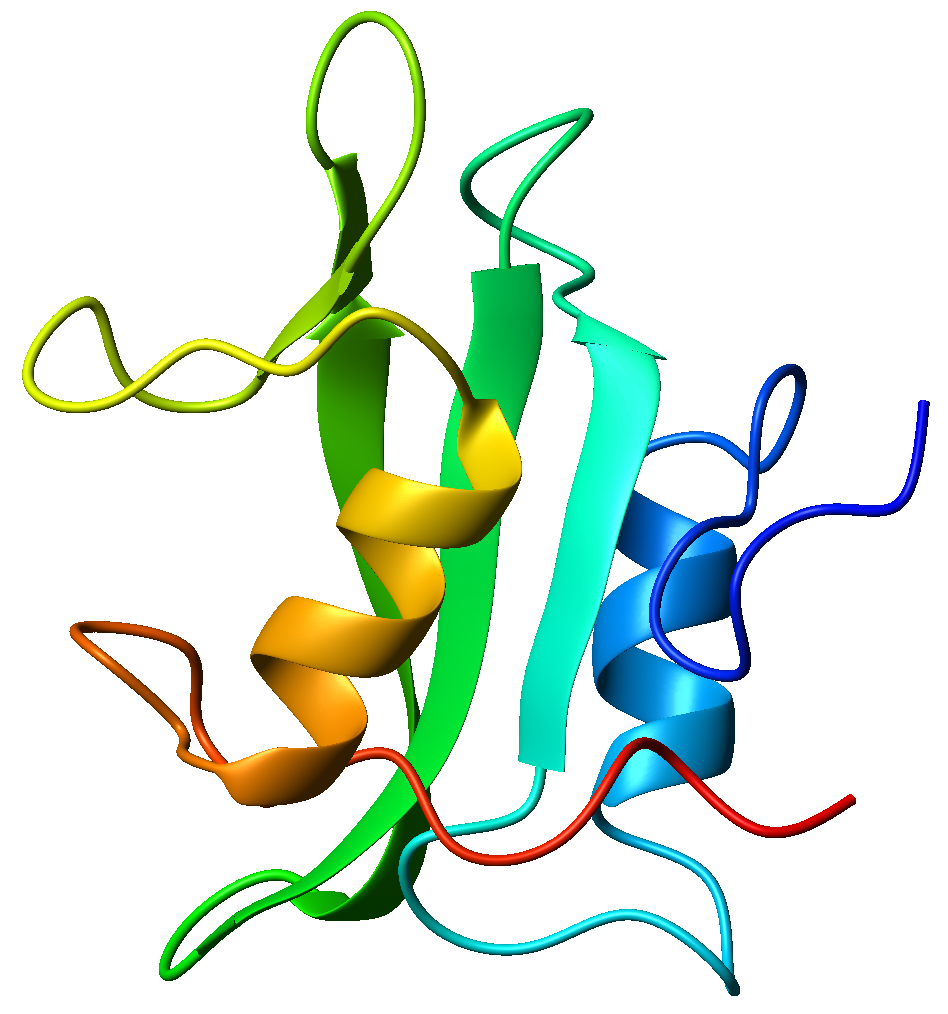
- Crystallographic structure of the SH2 domain. The structure consists of a large beta sheet (green) flanked by two alpha-helices (orange and blue).

Identifiers
- Symbol: SH2
- Pfam: PF00017
- InterPro: IPR000980
- SMART: SH2
- PROSITE: PDOC50001
- SCOP2: 1sha / SCOPe / SUPFAM
- CDD: cd00173
Available protein structures:
- PDB: IPR000980 PF00017 (ECOD; PDBsum)
- AlphaFold: IPR000980; PF00017

The SH2 (Src Homology 2) domain is a structurally conserved protein domain contained within the Src oncoprotein and in many other intracellular signal-transducing proteins. SH2 domains bind to phosphorylated tyrosine residues on other proteins, modifying the function or activity of the SH2-containing protein. The SH2 domain may be considered as a prototypical modular protein-protein interaction domain, in that it allows for the transmission of signals controlling a variety of intracellular functions. SH2 domains are especially common in adaptor proteins that aid in the signal transduction of receptor tyrosine kinase pathways.

== Structure and interactions ==
SH2 domains contain about 100 amino acid residues and exhibit a central antiparallel β-sheet centered between two α-helices. Binding to phosphotyrosine-containing peptides involves a strictly-conserved Arg residue that pairs with the negatively-charged phosphate on the phosphotyrosine, and a surrounding pocket that recognizes flanking sequences on the target peptide. Compared to other signaling proteins, SH2 domains exhibit only a moderate degree of specificity for their target peptides, due to the relative weakness of the interactions with the flanking sequences.

Over 100 human proteins are known to contain SH2 domains. A variety of tyrosine-containing sequences have been found to bind SH2 domains and are conserved across a wide range of organisms, performing similar functions. Binding of a phosphotyrosine-containing protein to an SH2 domain may lead to either activation or inactivation of the SH2-containing protein, depending on the types of interactions formed between the SH2 domain and other domains of the enzyme. Mutations that disrupt the structural stability of the SH2 domain, or that affect the binding of the phosphotyrosine peptide of the target, are involved in a range of diseases including X-linked agammaglobulinemia and severe combined immunodeficiency.

== Diversity ==
SH2 domains are not present in yeast and appear at the boundary between protozoa and animalia in organisms such as the social amoeba Dictyostelium discoideum.

A detailed bioinformatic examination of SH2 domains of human and mouse reveals 120 SH2 domains contained within 115 proteins encoded by the human genome, representing a rapid rate of evolutionary expansion among the SH2 domains.

A large number of SH2 domain structures have been solved and many SH2 proteins have been knocked out in mice.

== Applications ==
SH2 domains, and other binding domains, have been used in protein engineering to create protein assemblies. Protein assemblies are formed when several proteins bind to one another to create a larger structure (called a supramolecular assembly). Using molecular biology techniques, fusion proteins of specific enzymes and SH2 domains have been created, which can bind to each other to form protein assemblies.

Since SH2 domains require phosphorylation in order for binding to occur, the use of kinase and phosphatase enzymes gives researchers control over whether protein assemblies will form or not. High affinity engineered SH2 domains have been developed and utilized for protein assembly applications.

The goal of most protein assembly formation is to increase the efficiency of metabolic pathways via enzymatic co-localization. Other applications of SH2 domain mediated protein assemblies have been in the formation of high density fractal-like structures, which have extensive molecular trapping properties.

== Examples ==
Human proteins containing this domain include:

- ABL1; ABL2
- BCAR3; BLK; BLNK; BMX; BTK
- CHN2; CISH; CRK; CRKL; CSK
- DAPP1
- FER; FES; FGR; FRK; FYN
- GRAP; GRAP2; GRB10; GRB14; GRB2; GRB7
- HCK; HSH2D
- INPP5D; INPPL1; ITK; JAK2; LCK; LCP2; LYN
- MATK; NCK1; NCK2
- PIK3R1; PIK3R2; PIK3R3; PLCG1; PLCG2; PTK6; PTPN11; PTPN6; RASA1
- SH2B1; SH2B2; SH2B3; SH2D1A; SH2D1B; SH2D2A; SH2D3A; SH2D3C; SH2D4A; SH2D4B; SH2D5; SH2D6; SH3BP2; SHB; SHC1; SHC3; SHC4; SHD; SHE
- SLA; SLA2
- SOCS1; SOCS2; SOCS3; SOCS4; SOCS5; SOCS6; SOCS7
- SRC; SRMS
- STAT1; STAT2; STAT3; STAT4; STAT5A; STAT5B; STAT6
- SUPT6H; SYK
- TEC; TENC1; TNS; TNS1; TNS3; TNS4; TXK
- VAV1; VAV2; VAV3
- YES1; ZAP70

== See also ==
- Phosphotyrosine-binding domains also bind phosphorylated tyrosines
- Anthony Pawson, discoverer of the SH2 Domain
