= Signal transducing adaptor protein =

Type of protein

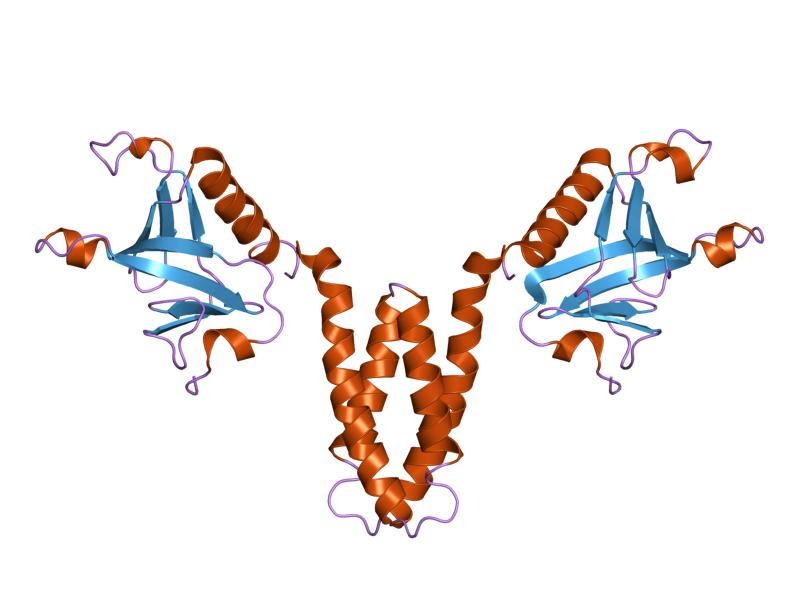
Src-associated adaptor protein Skap2 with 1u5e code

Signal transducing adaptor proteins (STAPs) are proteins that are accessory to main proteins in a signal transduction pathway. Adaptor proteins contain a variety of protein-binding modules that link protein-binding partners together and facilitate the creation of larger signaling complexes. These proteins tend to lack any intrinsic enzymatic activity themselves, instead mediating specific protein–protein interactions that drive the formation of protein complexes. Examples of adaptor proteins include MYD88, Grb2 and SHC1.

== Signaling components ==
Much of the specificity of signal transduction depends on the recruitment of several signalling components such as protein kinases and G-protein GTPases into short-lived active complexes in response to an activating signal such as a growth factor binding to its receptor.

== Domains ==
Adaptor proteins usually contain several domains within their structure (e.g., Src homology 2 (SH2) and SH3 domains) that allow specific interactions with several other specific proteins. SH2 domains recognise specific amino acid sequences within proteins containing phosphotyrosine residues and SH3 domains recognise proline-rich sequences within specific peptide sequence contexts of proteins.

There are many other types of interaction domains found within adaptor and other signalling proteins that allow a rich diversity of specific and coordinated protein–protein interactions to occur within the cell during signal transduction.

== Examples of adaptor proteins ==
Adaptor proteins include:

- BCAR3 – Breast cancer anti-estrogen resistance protein 3
- CBL – Casitas B-lineage Lymphoma
- FRS2 – Fibroblast growth factor receptor substrate 2
- GAB2 – GRB2-associated binding protein 2
- GRAP – GRB2-related adaptor protein
- GRAP2 – GRB2-related adaptor protein 2
- GRB2 – Growth factor receptor-bound protein 2
- IRS1 – Insulin receptor substrate 1
- LDLRAP1 – low-density lipoprotein receptor adaptor protein 1
- MYD88 - Myeloid differentiation primary response gene 88
- NCDN - Neurochondrin
- NCK1 – NCK adaptor protein 1
- NCK2 – NCK adaptor protein 2
- NOS1AP – nitric oxide synthase 1 (neuronal) adaptor protein
- PIK3AP1 – phosphoinositide-3-kinase adaptor protein 1
- SH2B1 – SH2B adaptor protein 1
- SH2B2 – SH2B adaptor protein 2
- SH2B3 – SH2B adaptor protein 3
- SH2D3A -SH2 domain containing 3A
- SH2D3C – SH2 domain containing 3C
- SNTA1 – Syntrophin, alpha 1
- SHB – Src homology 2 domain containing adaptor protein B
- SLC4A1AP – solute carrier family 4 (anion exchanger), member 1, adaptor protein

== See also ==
- Wikipedia:MeSH D12.776#MeSH D12.776.157.057 --- adaptor proteins.2C signal transducing
- Wikipedia:MeSH D12.776#MeSH D12.776.543.990.150 --- adaptor proteins.2C vesicular transport
