= KIT gene =

Mammalian protein and protein-coding gene

KIT
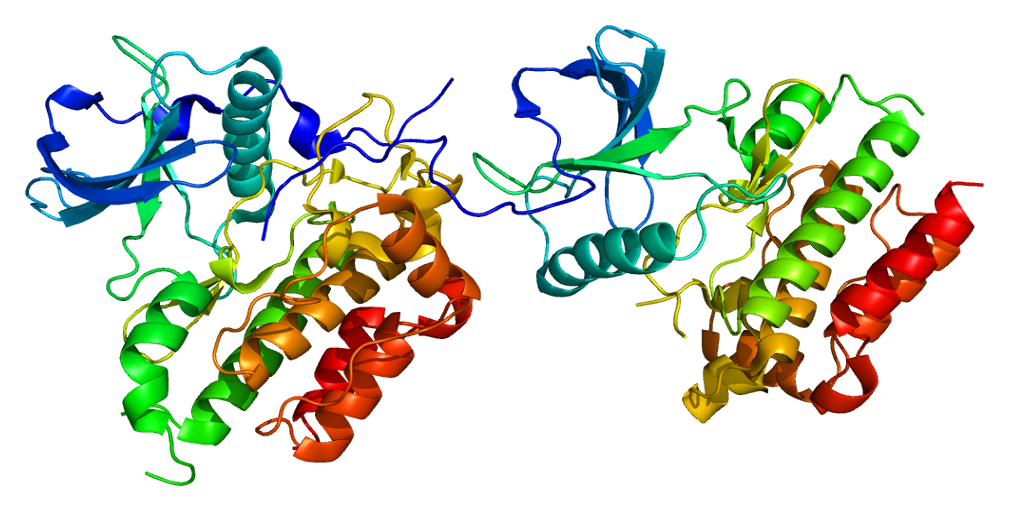

Identifiers
- Aliases: KIT, C-Kit, CD117, PBT, SCFR, KIT proto-oncogene receptor tyrosine kinase, MASTC, KIT proto-oncogene, receptor tyrosine kinase
- External IDs: OMIM: 164920; MGI: 96677; GeneCards: KIT
Available structures
PDB	Ortholog search: PDBe RCSB
PDB	List of PDB id codes 4U0I, 1PKG, 1T45, 1T46, 2E9W, 2EC8, 2VIF, 3G0E, 3G0F, 4HVS, 4K94, 4K9E, 4PGZ, 2IUH
Enzyme activity
EC #	BRENDA	ExPASy	KEGG	MetaCyc
2.7.10.1	↗	↗	↗	↗

Gene location (Human)
Chr.	Chromosome 4 (human)
Band	4q12	Start	54,657,918 bp
Band	4q12	End	54,740,715 bp

Gene location (Mouse)
Chr.	Chromosome 5 (mouse)
Band	5 C3.3|5 39.55 cM	Start	75,735,576 bp
Band	5 C3.3|5 39.55 cM	End	75,817,382 bp
RNA expression pattern
Bgee	Human / Mouse (ortholog); Top expressed in: lateral nuclear group of thalamus; secondary oocyte; skin of thigh; epithelium of lactiferous gland; gonad; lactiferous duct; cardia; parotid gland; skin of hip; visceral pleura / Top expressed in: lobe of cerebellum; cerebellar vermis; secondary oocyte; primary oocyte; zygote; gastrula; dermis; liver parenchyma; muscle layer of urethra; decidua; More reference expression data
BioGPS	n/a
Gene ontology
Molecular function	stem cell factor receptor activity; kinase activity; transmembrane receptor protein tyrosine kinase activity; ATP binding; cytokine binding; protein kinase activity; metal ion binding; transferase activity; protein homodimerization activity; protease binding; protein binding; protein tyrosine kinase activity; nucleotide binding; phosphatidylinositol-4,5-bisphosphate 3-kinase activity; receptor tyrosine kinase; transmembrane signaling receptor activity; SH2 domain binding
Cellular component	cytoplasm; membrane; cell-cell junction; cytoplasmic side of plasma membrane; cell surface; integral component of membrane; acrosomal vesicle; external side of plasma membrane; mast cell granule; extracellular space; plasma membrane; integral component of plasma membrane; receptor complex
Biological process	melanocyte migration; myeloid progenitor cell differentiation; positive regulation of MAP kinase activity; glycosphingolipid metabolic process; positive regulation of phospholipase C activity; hematopoietic stem cell migration; stem cell population maintenance; protein phosphorylation; T cell differentiation; spermatogenesis; cell chemotaxis; developmental pigmentation; melanocyte differentiation; positive regulation of Notch signaling pathway; lamellipodium assembly; cytokine-mediated signaling pathway; transmembrane receptor protein tyrosine kinase signaling pathway; melanocyte adhesion; lymphoid progenitor cell differentiation; spermatid development; erythrocyte differentiation; negative regulation of programmed cell death; protein autophosphorylation; mast cell degranulation; inflammatory response; positive regulation of MAPK cascade; myeloid leukocyte differentiation; male gonad development; phosphorylation; positive regulation of DNA-binding transcription factor activity; epithelial cell proliferation; stem cell differentiation; detection of mechanical stimulus involved in sensory perception of sound; regulation of cell shape; ovarian follicle development; ectopic germ cell programmed cell death; pigmentation; Fc receptor signaling pathway; response to radiation; mast cell cytokine production; positive regulation of receptor signaling pathway via JAK-STAT; dendritic cell cytokine production; visual learning; actin cytoskeleton reorganization; megakaryocyte development; intracellular signal transduction; somatic stem cell population maintenance; erythropoietin-mediated signaling pathway; Kit signaling pathway; positive regulation of cell migration; somatic stem cell division; mast cell chemotaxis; MAPK cascade; positive regulation of phosphatidylinositol 3-kinase activity; positive regulation of pseudopodium assembly; positive regulation of gene expression; positive regulation of long-term neuronal synaptic plasticity; regulation of cell population proliferation; cellular response to thyroid hormone stimulus; positive regulation of cell population proliferation; embryonic hemopoiesis; regulation of developmental pigmentation; positive regulation of phosphatidylinositol 3-kinase signaling; peptidyl-tyrosine phosphorylation; mast cell differentiation; digestive tract development; immature B cell differentiation; germ cell migration; signal transduction; mast cell proliferation; positive regulation of vascular associated smooth muscle cell differentiation; phosphatidylinositol phosphate biosynthetic process; regulation of transcription by RNA polymerase II; positive regulation of tyrosine phosphorylation of STAT protein; tongue development; response to cadmium ion; positive regulation of pyloric antrum smooth muscle contraction; regulation of bile acid metabolic process; positive regulation of small intestine smooth muscle contraction; positive regulation of colon smooth muscle contraction; positive regulation of protein kinase B signaling; hemopoiesis; negative regulation of signal transduction; cell differentiation; negative regulation of apoptotic process; positive regulation of ERK1 and ERK2 cascade; hematopoietic progenitor cell differentiation; B cell differentiation
Sources:Amigo / QuickGO
Orthologs
Databases	NCBI: entry; OMA: entry
Species	Human	Mouse
Entrez	3815	16590
Ensembl	ENSG00000157404	ENSMUSG00000005672
UniProt	P10721	P05532
RefSeq (mRNA)	NM_000222; NM_001093772	NM_001122733; NM_021099
RefSeq (protein)	NP_000213; NP_001087241	NP_001116205; NP_066922
Location (UCSC)	Chr 4: 54.66 – 54.74 Mb	Chr 5: 75.74 – 75.82 Mb
PubMed search
- Wikidata
View/Edit Human	View/Edit Mouse

Proto-oncogene c-KIT is the gene encoding the receptor tyrosine kinase protein known as tyrosine-protein kinase KIT, CD117 (cluster of differentiation 117) or mast/stem cell growth factor receptor (SCFR). Multiple transcript variants encoding different isoforms have been found for this gene. KIT was first described by the German biochemist Axel Ullrich in 1987 as the cellular homolog of the feline sarcoma viral oncogene v-kit.

== Function ==
KIT is a cytokine receptor expressed on the surface of hematopoietic stem cells as well as other cell types. Altered forms of this receptor may be associated with some types of cancer. KIT is a receptor tyrosine kinase type III, which binds to stem cell factor, also known as "steel factor" or "c-kit ligand". When this receptor binds to stem cell factor (SCF) it forms a dimer that activates its intrinsic tyrosine kinase activity, that in turn phosphorylates and activates signal transduction molecules that propagate the signal in the cell. After activation, the receptor is ubiquitinated to mark it for transport to a lysosome and eventual destruction. Signaling through KIT plays a role in cell survival, proliferation, and differentiation. For instance, KIT signaling is required for melanocyte survival, and it is also involved in haematopoiesis and gametogenesis.

== Structure ==
Like other members of the receptor tyrosine kinase III family, KIT consists of an extracellular domain, a transmembrane domain, a juxtamembrane domain, and an intracellular tyrosine kinase domain. The extracellular domain is composed of five immunoglobulin-like domains, and the protein kinase domain is interrupted by a hydrophilic insert sequence of about 80 amino acids. The ligand stem cell factor binds via the second and third immunoglobulin domains.

== Cell surface marker ==
Cluster of differentiation (CD) molecules are markers on the cell surface, as recognized by specific sets of antibodies, used to identify the cell type, stage of differentiation and activity of a cell. KIT is an important cell surface marker used to identify certain types of hematopoietic (blood) progenitors in the bone marrow. To be specific, hematopoietic stem cells (HSC), multipotent progenitors (MPP), and common myeloid progenitors (CMP) express high levels of KIT. Common lymphoid progenitors (CLP) express low surface levels of KIT. KIT also identifies the earliest thymocyte progenitors in the thymus—early T lineage progenitors (ETP/DN1) and DN2 thymocytes express high levels of c-Kit. It is also a marker for mouse prostate stem cells. In addition, mast cells, melanocytes in the skin, and interstitial cells of Cajal in the digestive tract express KIT. In humans, expression of c-kit in helper-like innate lymphoid cells (ILCs) which lack the expression of CRTH2 (CD294) is used to mark the ILC3 population.

CD117/c-KIT is expressed not only by bone marrow-derived stem cells, but also by those found in other adult organs, such as the prostate, liver, and heart, suggesting that SCF/c-KIT signaling pathways may contribute to stemness in some organs. Additionally, c-KIT has been associated with numerous biological processes in other cell types. For example, c-KIT signaling, has been shown to regulate oogenesis, folliculogenesis, and spermatogenesis, playing important roles in female and male fertility.

== Mobilization ==
Hematopoietic progenitor cells are normally present in the blood at low levels. Mobilization is the process by which progenitors are made to migrate from the bone marrow into the bloodstream, thus increasing their numbers in the blood. Mobilization is used clinically as a source of hematopoietic stem cells for hematopoietic stem cell transplantation (HSCT). Signaling through KIT has been implicated in mobilization. At the current time, G-CSF is the main drug used for mobilization; it indirectly activates KIT. Plerixafor (an antagonist of CXCR4-SDF1) in combination with G-CSF, is also being used for mobilization of hematopoietic progenitor cells. Direct KIT agonists are currently being developed as mobilization agents.

== Role in cancer ==
Activating mutations in this gene are associated with gastrointestinal stromal tumors, testicular seminoma, mast cell disease, melanoma, acute myeloid leukemia, while inactivating mutations are associated with the genetic defect piebaldism.

c-KIT plays an important role in regulating many mechanisms leading to tumor formation and progression of carcinomas. c-KIT has been proposed as a regulator of stemness in several cancers. Its expression has been linked to cancer stemness in ovarian cancer cells, colon cancer cells, non-small cell lung cancer cells, and prostate cancer cells. c-KIT has also been linked to the epithelial-mesenchymal transition (EMT), which is important for tumor aggressiveness and metastatic potential. Ectopic expression of c-KIT and EMT have been linked in denoid cystic carcinoma of the salivary gland, thymic carcinomas, ovarian cancer cells, and prostate cancer cells. Several lines of evidence suggest that SCF/c-KIT signaling plays an important role in the tumor microenvironment. For example, in mice high levels of c-KIT in mast cells as well as its presence in the tumor microenvironment promote angiogenesis, leading to increased tumor growth and metastasis.

=== Anti-KIT therapies ===
KIT is a proto-oncogene, meaning that overexpression or mutations of this protein can lead to cancer. Seminomas, a subtype of testicular germ cell tumors, frequently have activating mutations in exon 17 of KIT. In addition, the gene encoding KIT is frequently overexpressed and amplified in this tumor type, most commonly occurring as a single gene amplicon. Mutations of KIT have also been implicated in leukemia, a cancer of hematopoietic progenitors, melanoma, mast cell disease, and gastrointestinal stromal tumors (GISTs). The efficacy of imatinib (trade name Gleevec), a KIT inhibitor, is determined by the mutation status of KIT:

When the mutation has occurred in exon 11 (as is the case many times in GISTs), the tumors are responsive to imatinib. However, if the mutation occurs in exon 17 (as is often the case in seminomas and leukemias), the receptor is not inhibited by imatinib. In those cases other inhibitors such as dasatinib Avapritinib or nilotinib can be used. Researchers investigated the dynamic behavior of wild type and mutant D816H KIT receptor, and emphasized the extended A-loop (EAL) region (805-850) by conducting computational analysis. Their atomic investigation of mutant KIT receptor which emphasized on the EAL region provided a better insight into the understanding of the sunitinib resistance mechanism of the KIT receptor and could help to discover new therapeutics for KIT-based resistant tumor cells in GIST therapy.

The preclinical agent, KTN0182A, is an anti-KIT, pyrrolobenzodiazepine (PBD)-containing antibody-drug conjugate which shows anti-tumor activity in vitro and in vivo against a range of tumor types.

=== Diagnostic relevance ===
Antibodies to KIT are widely used in immunohistochemistry to help distinguish particular types of tumour in histological tissue sections. It is used primarily in the diagnosis of GISTs, which are positive for KIT, but negative for markers such as desmin and S-100, which are positive in smooth muscle and neural tumors, which have a similar appearance. In GISTs, KIT staining is typically cytoplasmic, with stronger accentuation along the cell membranes. KIT antibodies can also be used in the diagnosis of mast cell tumours and in distinguishing seminomas from embryonal carcinomas.

== Interactions ==
KIT has been shown to interact with:

- APS,
- BCR,
- CD63,
- CD81,
- CD9,
- CRK,
- CRKL,
- DOK1,
- FES,
- GRB10,
- Grb2,
- KITLG,
- LNK,
- LYN,
- MATK,
- MPDZ,
- PIK3R1,
- PTPN11,
- PTPN6,
- STAT1,
- SOCS1,
- SOCS6,
- SRC, and
- TEC.

== See also ==
- Cytokine receptor
- List of genes mutated in pigmented cutaneous lesions
