= ABLIM3 =

Protein-coding gene in the species Homo sapiens

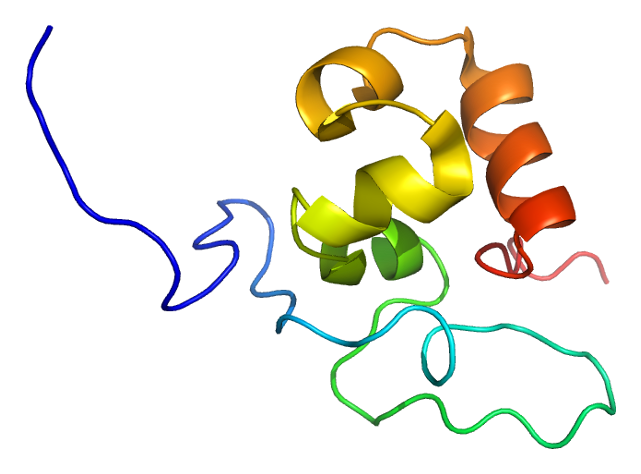

Identifiers
- Aliases: ABLIM3, HMFN1661, actin binding LIM protein family member 3
- External IDs: OMIM: 611305; MGI: 2442582; GeneCards: ABLIM3
Available structures
PDB	Ortholog search: PDBe RCSB
PDB	List of PDB id codes 1UJS, 2DJ7

Gene location (Human)
Chr.	Chromosome 5 (human)
Band	5q32	Start	149,141,483 bp
Band	5q32	End	149,260,542 bp

Gene location (Mouse)
Chr.	Chromosome 18 (mouse)
Band	18|18 E1	Start	61,932,463 bp
Band	18|18 E1	End	62,044,895 bp
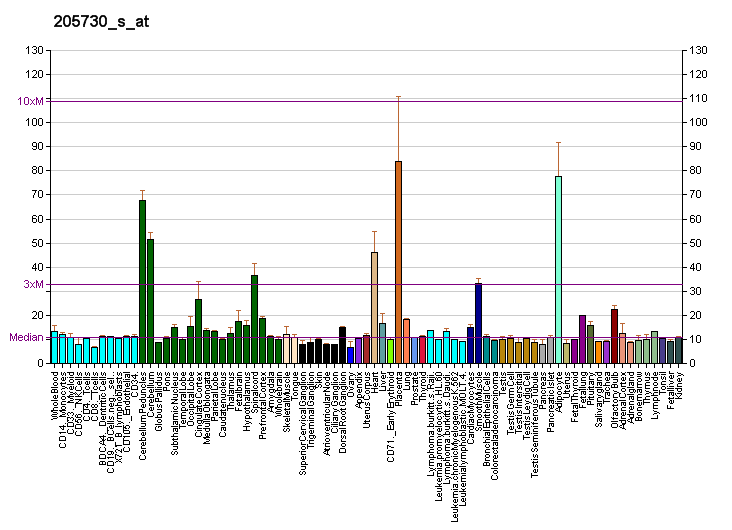
RNA expression pattern
Bgee	Human / Mouse (ortholog); Top expressed in: apex of heart; right auricle of heart; cardiac muscle tissue of right atrium; glutes; cerebellar hemisphere; right hemisphere of cerebellum; left ventricle; paraflocculus of cerebellum; subcutaneous adipose tissue; right lobe of liver / Top expressed in: lumbar spinal ganglion; right lung lobe; interventricular septum; supraoptic nucleus; trigeminal ganglion; otolith organ; cerebellum; cerebellar cortex; utricle; myocardium of ventricle; More reference expression data
BioGPS	More reference expression data
Gene ontology
Molecular function	metal ion binding; actin binding; protein binding
Cellular component	cytoplasm; stress fiber; lamellipodium
Biological process	cytoskeleton organization; actin cytoskeleton organization; transcription, DNA-templated; lamellipodium assembly; positive regulation of transcription by RNA polymerase II; positive regulation of protein targeting to mitochondrion; cilium assembly
Sources:Amigo / QuickGO
Orthologs
Databases	NCBI: entry; OMA: entry
Species	Human	Mouse
Entrez	22885	319713
Ensembl	ENSG00000173210	ENSMUSG00000032735
UniProt	O94929	Q69ZX8
RefSeq (mRNA)	NM_001301015; NM_001301018; NM_001301027; NM_001301028; NM_014945 NM_001345858; NM_001345859; NM_001345860; NM_001345861; NM_001370417; NM_001370418	NM_001164491; NM_198649; NM_001360868
RefSeq (protein)	NP_001287944; NP_001287947; NP_001287957; NP_001332787; NP_001332788 NP_001332789; NP_001332790; NP_055760; NP_001357346; NP_001357347	NP_001157963; NP_941051; NP_001347797
Location (UCSC)	Chr 5: 149.14 – 149.26 Mb	Chr 18: 61.93 – 62.04 Mb
PubMed search
- Wikidata
View/Edit Human	View/Edit Mouse

Actin-binding LIM protein 3 is a protein that in humans is encoded by the ABLIM3 gene.

== Function ==
The LIM domain is a double zinc finger structure that promotes protein-protein interactions. LIM domain proteins, such as ABLIM3, play roles in embryonic development, cell lineage determination, and cancer. An important paralog of this gene is LIMS1.

== Clinical relevance ==
Diseases associated with ABLIM3 include hepatoblastoma, and among its related super-pathways are axon guidance and DCC mediated attractive signaling.
