= HSH2D =

Identifiers
- Aliases: HSH2D, ALX, HSH2, hematopoietic SH2 domain containing
- External IDs: OMIM: 608349; MGI: 2676364; GeneCards: HSH2D
Available structures
PDB	Ortholog search: PDBe RCSB
PDB	List of PDB id codes 2CS0

Gene location (Human)
Chr.	Chromosome 19 (human)
Band	19p13.11	Start	16,134,028 bp
Band	19p13.11	End	16,158,575 bp

Gene location (Mouse)
Chr.	Chromosome 8 (mouse)
Band	8|8 B3.3	Start	72,943,482 bp
Band	8|8 B3.3	End	72,955,371 bp
RNA expression pattern
Bgee	Human / Mouse (ortholog); Top expressed in: granulocyte; bone marrow cell; monocyte; appendix; spleen; blood; lymph node; mucosa of transverse colon; rectum; gallbladder / Top expressed in: granulocyte; morula; mesenteric lymph nodes; spleen; blood; Paneth cell; thymus; embryo; subcutaneous adipose tissue; duodenum; More reference expression data
BioGPS	n/a
Gene ontology
Molecular function	protein binding
Cellular component	cytosol; nucleus; cytoplasm; mitochondrion
Biological process	positive regulation of signal transduction; T cell activation; negative regulation of B cell apoptotic process; negative regulation of mitochondrial depolarization; signal transduction
Sources:Amigo / QuickGO
Orthologs
Databases	NCBI: entry; OMA: entry
Species	Human	Mouse
Entrez	84941	209488
Ensembl	ENSG00000196684	ENSMUSG00000062007
UniProt	Q96JZ2	Q6VYH9
RefSeq (mRNA)	NM_001291274; NM_032855; NM_001352265; NM_001352266	NM_197944
RefSeq (protein)	NP_116244; NP_001339194; NP_001339195; NP_001356737; NP_001356738 NP_001369346	NP_922935
Location (UCSC)	Chr 19: 16.13 – 16.16 Mb	Chr 8: 72.94 – 72.96 Mb
PubMed search
- Wikidata
View/Edit Human	View/Edit Mouse

Hematopoietic SH2 Domain Containing (HSH2D) protein is a protein encoded by the hematopoietic SH2 domain containing (HSH2D) gene.

== Gene ==
HSH2D is located on chromosome 19 at 19p13.11. Common aliases of the gene include HSH2 (Hematopoietic SH2 Protein) and ALX (Adaptor in Lymphocytes of Unknown Function X). The mRNA encodes two main isoforms. Isoform 1, the longest isoform, contains seven exons. The gene spans from 16134028 to 16158575.

== mRNA ==
Two main isoforms of HSH2D exist. Isoform 1 has seven exons and is 2,403 bp in length. Isoform 2 has six exons and is 2,936 bp long. Although isoform 2 has longer mRNA, it still produces the smaller isoform in the mature protein. Isoform 2 has a variant 5’ UTR and a different start codon, as well as a shorter N-terminus. The mRNA has a short 5' UTR and a long 3' UTR.

== Protein ==
The protein has a molecular weight of 39.0 kilodaltons (kDa) and a pI of 6.678. The main feature of the protein is the SH2 (Src homology) domain, which is a region that has phosphotyrosine receptors and is important in many signaling molecules. This domain is located from residues 26-127.

The secondary structure of the protein contains a helical section around residues 40-50, a sheet between 60-70, helices between 100-110, 135-145, 175-180, 200-225, and additional sheets between 235-240 and 295-300, shown in the figure at the bottom of the section (helices are purple arrows and sheets are red arrows). The protein has several locations of post-translational modifications, especially phosphorylation and GalNAc O-glycosylation, which has been shown to play a role in cancers.

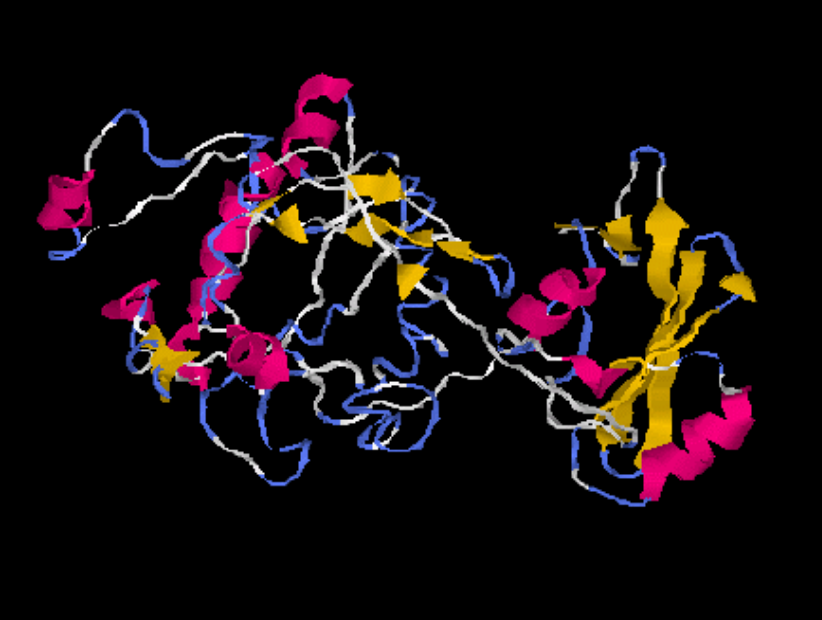
Predicted 3D structure of the HSH2D protein

The tertiary structure of the protein has not been confirmed through research, however, predictions using I-TASSER software are useful in visualizing the protein.

== Expression ==
Based on NCBI GEO expression profiles and EST analyses, the protein appears to be narrowly expressed throughout human tissues. It is highly expressed in bone marrow, CD4+ and CD8+ T cells, lymph node, mammary gland, spleen, stomach, thyroid, and small intestine tissue. Expression is elevated in cases of early T-cell precursor acute lymphoblastic leukemia and lowered in breast cancer cells that are treated with estrogen, suggesting an interaction between the protein and estrogen.

== Function ==
The function of the HSH2D protein is still not fully understood, however it has been shown to play a role in various cellular functions such as apoptosis, wound healing, vascular endothelial growth factors, membrane-associated intracellular trafficking, biogenesis of lipid droplets and collagen remodeling. It is also thought to play a role in T-cell activation.

== Interacting proteins ==
HSH2D interacts with several proto-oncogenes, including FES proto-oncogene (FES) and CRK proto-oncogene (CRK). It also has suspected interactions with other proteins such as tyrosine kinase non-receptor 2 (TRK2), PTEN-induced putative kinase (PINK1), and Interleukin 2 (IL2). A summary of these proteins is shown below with their suspected functions.

Name	NCBI Accession Number	Function
FES proto-oncogene (FES)	NP_001996.1	Hematopoiesis, growth factor and cytokine receptor signaling.
CRK proto-oncogene (CRK)	NP_058431.2	Adaptor that binds to tyrosine-phosphorylated proteins. Has SH2 and SH3 domains
Tyrosine kinase non-receptor 2 (TNK2)	NP_005772.3	Tyrosine kinase which may be linked to tyrosine phosphorylation signal transduction pathways.
PTEN-induced putative kinase (PINK1)	NP_115785.1	Serine/threonine protein kinase
Interleukin 2 (IL2)	NP_000577.2	Cytokine important for T- and B- cell proliferation

== Clinical significance ==
The HSH2D protein has been studied along other human genes predicted to be involved in the human immune system. HSH2D was found to be highly expressed in patients with ulcerative colitis. The protein is also associated with alpha-interferon activity.

== Homology ==
HSH2D has four distant paralogs and several orthologs in other species that have high levels of conservation.

=== Paralogs ===
The four paralogs of HSH2D in humans are other proteins containing SH2 domains. They do not have a high level of conservation other than this domain. All paralogs were found through genecards

Name	NCBI Accession Number	Sequence length (Amino Acids)	Sequence similarity	Sequence identity
SH2D2A	NP_001154913.1	399	29%	21.7%
SH2D7	NP_001094874.1	451	33.1%	25.9%
SH2D4A	NP_001167630.1	454	12%	17.4%
SH2D4B	NP_997255.2	357	33.7%	18.1%

=== Orthologs ===
HSH2D has several orthologous proteins that span across several orders of species. The protein was well conserved across mammals as well as a few reptiles, amphibians, and invertebrates. The following list is not exhaustive, rather, it shows the wide range of organisms that the protein may be found in. All orthologous proteins were found with BLAST or BLAT programs.

Scientific name	Common name	Order	NCBI Accession Number	Sequence length (Amino Acids)	Sequence identity	Sequence similarity
Pan troglodytes	Chimpanzee	Primates	NP_001229302.1	352	99%	99.70%
Heterocephalus glaber	Naked Mole Rat	Rodentia	EHB15865.1	324	54%	63.40%
Hipposideros armiger	Great roundleaf bat	Chiroptera	XP_019497370.1	360	67%	76.10%
Condylura cristata	Star nosed mole	Soricomorpha	XP_004688256.1	355	62%	72.10%
Camelus dromedarius	Dromedary camel	Cetariodactyla	XP_010993355.1	360	66%	75.70%
Panthera pardus	Leopard	Carnivora	XP_019271712.1	360	62%	71.40%
Meleagris gallopavo	Wild Turkey	Bird	XP_010723595.1	326	23%	28.80%
Anolis carolinensis	Carolina anole	Reptile	XP_016854511.1	567	22%	31.50%
Xenopus tropicalis	Western clawed frog	Amphibian	XP_012809627.1	363	31%	42.80%
Callorhinchus milii	Australian Ghostshark	Fish	XP_007899329.1	500	26%	33.10%
Lingula anatina	Lingula	Invertebrate	XP_013404014.1	187	18%	23.40%
Biomphalaria glabrata	N/A	Invertebrate	XP_013080865.1	818	12%	10.10%
Salpingoeca rosetta	N/A	Protista	XP_004995081.1	481	17.70%	10.90%
