= SH2D3C =

Protein-coding gene in the species Homo sapiens

Identifiers
- Aliases: SH2D3C, Sh2d3c, Chat, Nsp3, Shep1, PRO34088, SH2 domain containing 3C
- External IDs: OMIM: 604722; MGI: 1351631; GeneCards: SH2D3C
Available structures
PDB	Ortholog search: PDBe RCSB
PDB	List of PDB id codes 3T6G

Gene location (Human)
Chr.	Chromosome 9 (human)
Band	9q34.11	Start	127,738,317 bp
Band	9q34.11	End	127,778,710 bp

Gene location (Mouse)
Chr.	Chromosome 2 (mouse)
Band	2|2 B	Start	32,611,067 bp
Band	2|2 B	End	32,645,524 bp
RNA expression pattern
Bgee	Human / Mouse (ortholog); Top expressed in: granulocyte; right lung; blood; apex of heart; upper lobe of left lung; spleen; monocyte; lower lobe of lung; left ventricle; lymph node / Top expressed in: granulocyte; zygote; secondary oocyte; right lung; primary visual cortex; neural tube; internal carotid artery; external carotid artery; spleen; tibiofemoral joint; More reference expression data
BioGPS	n/a
Gene ontology
Molecular function	protein binding; guanyl-nucleotide exchange factor activity
Cellular component	cytoplasm; membrane
Biological process	small GTPase mediated signal transduction; JNK cascade; positive regulation of signal transduction; positive regulation of peptidyl-serine phosphorylation
Sources:Amigo / QuickGO
Orthologs
Databases	NCBI: entry; OMA: entry
Species	Human	Mouse
Entrez	10044	27387
Ensembl	ENSG00000095370	ENSMUSG00000059013
UniProt	Q8N5H7	Q9QZS8
RefSeq (mRNA)	NM_001142531; NM_001142532; NM_001142533; NM_001142534; NM_001252334 NM_005489; NM_170600	NM_001252547; NM_013781
RefSeq (protein)	NP_001136003; NP_001136004; NP_001136005; NP_001136006; NP_001239263 NP_005480; NP_733745	NP_001239476; NP_038809
Location (UCSC)	Chr 9: 127.74 – 127.78 Mb	Chr 2: 32.61 – 32.65 Mb
PubMed search
- Wikidata
View/Edit Human	View/Edit Mouse

SH2 domain containing 3C, also known as SH2D3C, is a protein that in humans is encoded by the SH2D3C gene.

== Function ==
Sh2d3c is a gene on human chromosome 9 that encodes an SH2 domain containing protein known as NSP3. The mouse homologue is found on chromosome 2. The NSP (Novel SH2-containing Protein) family of proteins contains three members, NSP1, NSP2, and NSP3 (this protein), all of which have a similar architecture, with an N-terminal SH2 domain, a proline serine rich region, which contains consensus sequences for MAP kinase substrates, and a conserved C-terminus, which binds to the Cas family of adapter proteins, and also shows homology to GEF domains.

NSP3 was originally identified by three independent groups of researchers. The mouse homologue of NSP3 has been shown to have two distinct isoforms, generated by alternative splicing, that are expressed in different tissues. The shorter isoform, known as Chat (Cas/Hef1 associated signal transducer) is expressed in brain, lung, heart, kidney, muscle, liver, and intestine, while the larger isoform, known as Chat-H (the "H" is for Hematopoietic), is expressed in spleen, thymus, and lymph nodes. The two isoforms differ only in their N-terminus, which has been shown by one group to be important for membrane localization.

Through its interaction with Hef1, Chat-H, has been shown to be an important regulator of lymphocyte adhesion, acting upstream of Rap1 in the integrin activation pathway.
