= GRB10 =

Protein-coding gene in the species Homo sapiens

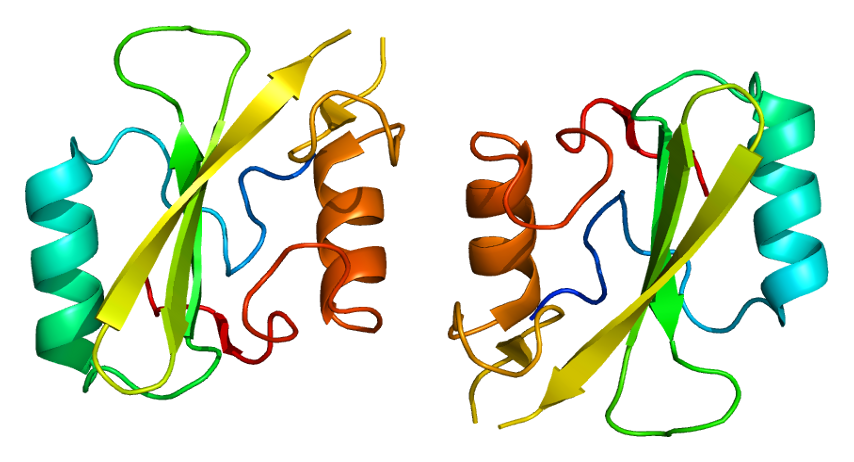

Identifiers
- Aliases: GRB10, GRB-IR, Grb-10, IRBP, MEG1, RSS, growth factor receptor bound protein 10
- External IDs: OMIM: 601523; MGI: 103232; GeneCards: GRB10
Available structures
| PDB | Ortholog search: PDBe RCSB |
| PDB | List of PDB id codes 3HK0, 1NRV |

Gene location (Human)
| Chr. | Chromosome 7 (human) |
| Band | 7p12.1 | Start | 50,590,063 bp |
| Band | 7p12.1 | End | 50,793,462 bp |

Gene location (Mouse)
| Chr. | Chromosome 11 (mouse) |
| Band | 11 A1|11 7.15 cM | Start | 11,880,508 bp |
| Band | 11 A1|11 7.15 cM | End | 11,988,683 bp |
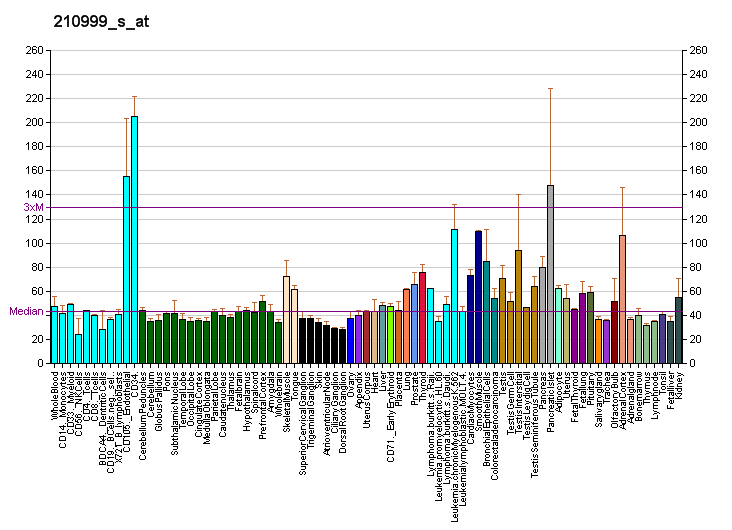

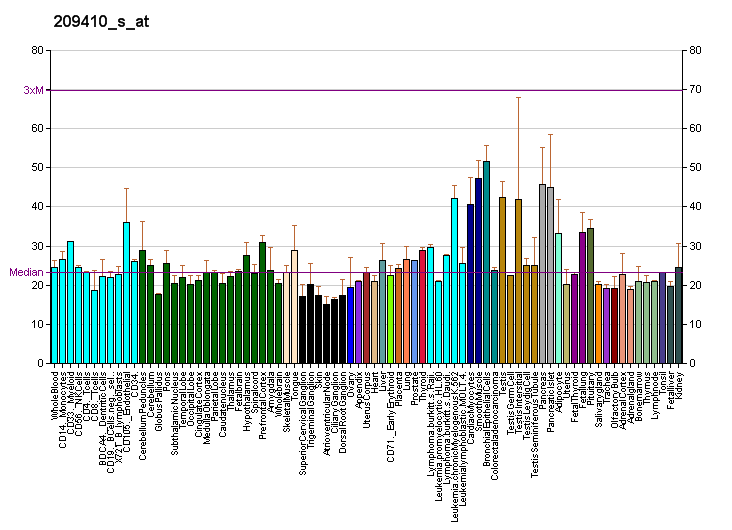

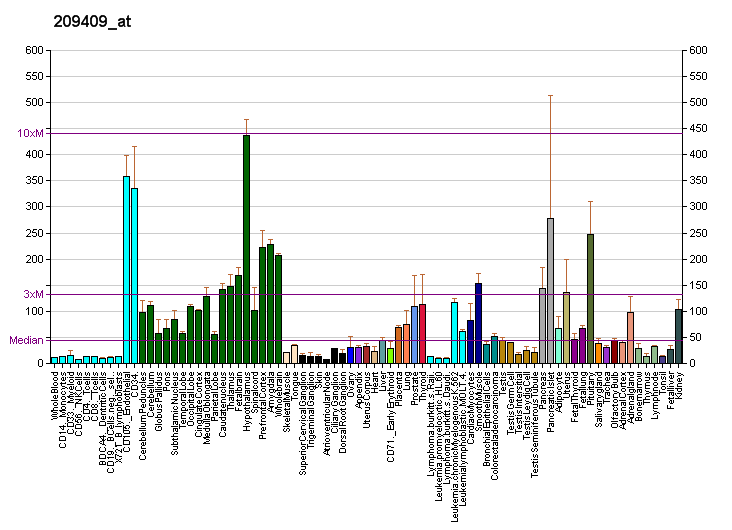
RNA expression pattern
| Bgee | Human / Mouse (ortholog); Top expressed in: body of pancreas; pars compacta; visceral pleura; Brodmann area 23; pars reticulata; endothelial cell; dorsal motor nucleus of vagus nerve; middle temporal gyrus; pancreatic ductal cell; Epithelium of choroid plexus / Top expressed in: mandibular prominence; endocardial cushion; atrium; maxillary prominence; atrioventricular valve; Gonadal ridge; abdominal wall; ureter; primitive streak; dermis; More reference expression data |
| BioGPS | More reference expression data |
Gene ontology
| Molecular function | protein binding; insulin receptor binding; identical protein binding |
| Cellular component | cytoplasm; cytosol; plasma membrane; protein-containing complex |
| Biological process | response to insulin; positive regulation of vascular endothelial growth factor receptor signaling pathway; negative regulation of glucose import; negative regulation of insulin receptor signaling pathway; insulin-like growth factor receptor signaling pathway; negative regulation of phosphorylation; positive regulation of phosphorylation; negative regulation of glycogen biosynthetic process; signal transduction; insulin receptor signaling pathway; axon guidance; negative regulation of Wnt signaling pathway; positive regulation of cold-induced thermogenesis |
Sources:Amigo / QuickGO
Orthologs
| Databases | NCBI: entry; OMA: entry |
| Species | Human | Mouse |
| Entrez | 2887 | 14783 |
| Ensembl | ENSG00000106070 | ENSMUSG00000020176 |
| UniProt | Q13322 | Q60760 |
| RefSeq (mRNA) | NM_001001549; NM_001001550; NM_001001555; NM_005311; NM_001350814 NM_001350815; NM_001350816; NM_001371008; NM_001371009 | NM_001177629; NM_010345; NM_001370603 |
| RefSeq (protein) | NP_001001549; NP_001001550; NP_001001555; NP_001337743; NP_001337744 NP_001337745; NP_001357937; NP_001357938 | NP_001171100; NP_034475; NP_001357532 |
| Location (UCSC) | Chr 7: 50.59 – 50.79 Mb | Chr 11: 11.88 – 11.99 Mb |
| PubMed search |
- Wikidata
| View/Edit Human | View/Edit Mouse |

Growth factor receptor-bound protein 10 also known as insulin receptor-binding protein Grb-IR is a protein that in humans is encoded by the GRB10 gene.

== Function ==
The product of this gene belongs to a small family of adaptor proteins that are known to interact with a number of receptor tyrosine kinases and signaling molecules. This gene encodes a growth factor receptor-binding protein that interacts with insulin receptors and insulin-like growth-factor receptors (e.g., IGF1R and IGF2R). Overexpression of some isoforms of the encoded protein inhibits tyrosine kinase activity and results in growth suppression. This gene is imprinted in a highly isoform- and tissue-specific manner. Alternatively spliced transcript variants encoding different isoforms have been identified.

== Animal studies ==
Mice whose paternally inherited GRB10 gene is inactivated are more aggressive while those whose maternally inherited allele is inactivated exhibit foetal overgrowth and are significantly bigger than wild-type litter-mates.

== Interactions ==
GRB10 has been shown to interact with

- Abl gene,
- BCR gene,
- C-Raf,
- c-Kit,
- Insulin receptor,
- Insulin-like growth factor 1 receptor,
- MAP2K1, and
- RET proto-oncogene.
