= NCK2 =

Protein-coding gene in the species Homo sapiens

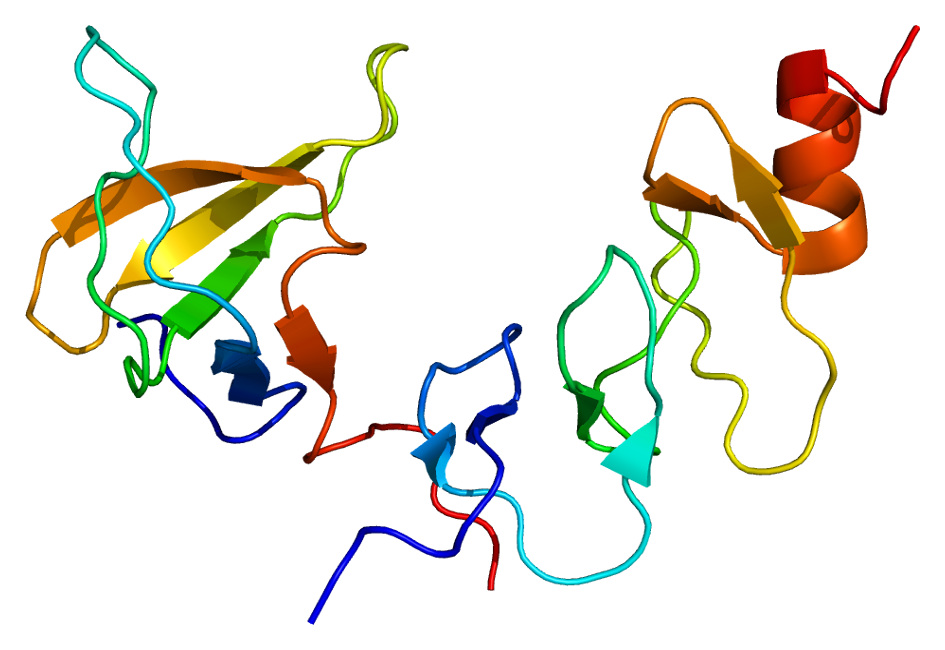

Identifiers
- Aliases: NCK2, GRB4, NCKbeta, NCK adaptor protein 2
- External IDs: OMIM: 604930; MGI: 1306821; GeneCards: NCK2
Available structures
PDB	Ortholog search: PDBe RCSB
PDB	List of PDB id codes 1U5S, 1WX6, 1Z3K, 2B86, 2CIA, 2FRW, 2FRY, 2JXB, 4E6R

Gene location (Human)
Chr.	Chromosome 2 (human)
Band	2q12.2	Start	105,744,912 bp
Band	2q12.2	End	105,894,274 bp

Gene location (Mouse)
Chr.	Chromosome 1 (mouse)
Band	1|1 C1.1	Start	43,483,739 bp
Band	1|1 C1.1	End	43,609,675 bp
RNA expression pattern
Bgee	Human / Mouse (ortholog); Top expressed in: hair follicle; parotid gland; secondary oocyte; Region I of hippocampus proper; ganglionic eminence; cartilage tissue; duodenum; olfactory zone of nasal mucosa; gums; gastric mucosa / Top expressed in: dentate gyrus of hippocampal formation granule cell; ventricular zone; thymus; lip; tail of embryo; yolk sac; primary visual cortex; spermatid; right kidney; genital tubercle; More reference expression data
BioGPS	n/a
Gene ontology
Molecular function	scaffold protein binding; protein binding; cytoskeletal anchor activity; signaling receptor complex adaptor activity; phosphotyrosine residue binding; protein-containing complex binding
Cellular component	cytosol; vesicle membrane; synapse; endoplasmic reticulum; cytoplasm; postsynaptic density
Biological process	positive regulation of actin filament polymerization; epidermal growth factor receptor signaling pathway; positive regulation of endoplasmic reticulum stress-induced intrinsic apoptotic signaling pathway; actin filament organization; positive regulation of translation in response to endoplasmic reticulum stress; ephrin receptor signaling pathway; signal complex assembly; dendritic spine development; vascular endothelial growth factor receptor signaling pathway; positive regulation of T cell proliferation; negative regulation of peptidyl-serine phosphorylation; regulation of epidermal growth factor-activated receptor activity; negative regulation of endoplasmic reticulum stress-induced eIF2 alpha phosphorylation; immunological synapse formation; cell migration; negative regulation of PERK-mediated unfolded protein response; negative regulation of transcription from RNA polymerase II promoter in response to endoplasmic reticulum stress; T cell activation; regulation of translation; lamellipodium assembly; signal transduction; negative regulation of cell population proliferation; positive regulation of transcription by RNA polymerase II
Sources:Amigo / QuickGO
Orthologs
Databases	NCBI: entry; OMA: entry
Species	Human	Mouse
Entrez	8440	17974
Ensembl	ENSG00000071051	ENSMUSG00000066877
UniProt	O43639	O55033
RefSeq (mRNA)	NM_001004720; NM_001004722; NM_003581	NM_010879
RefSeq (protein)	NP_001004720; NP_001004722; NP_003572	NP_035009
Location (UCSC)	Chr 2: 105.74 – 105.89 Mb	Chr 1: 43.48 – 43.61 Mb
PubMed search
- Wikidata
View/Edit Human	View/Edit Mouse

Cytoplasmic protein NCK2 (also known as NCK-beta and Grb4) is a protein that in humans is encoded by the NCK2 gene.

== Function ==
NCK belongs to family of adaptor proteins. There are two mammalian NCK genes, NCK1 and NCK2. NCK1 is located in chromosome 3 and NCK2 is located in chromosome 2. The protein contains three SH3 domains and one SH2 domain. The protein has no known catalytic function but has been shown to bind and recruit various proteins involved in the regulation of receptor protein tyrosine kinases. It is through these regulatory activities that this protein is believed to be involved in cytoskeletal reorganization. Alternate transcriptional splice variants, encoding different isoforms, have been characterized.

== Interactions ==
NCK2 has been shown to interact with:

- Epidermal growth factor receptor,
- LIMS1,
- PDGFRB,
- PTK2,
- T-cell surface glycoprotein CD3 epsilon chain and
- TrkB.
