= Breakpoint cluster region protein =

BCR
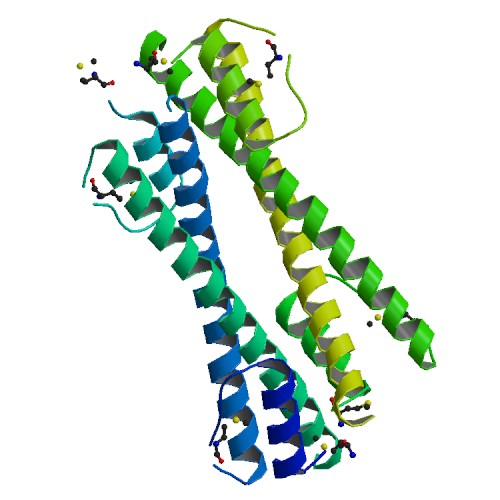

Identifiers
- Aliases: BCR, Bcr, 5133400C09Rik, AI561783, AI853148, mKIAA3017, ALL, BCR1, CML, D22S11, D22S662, PHL, RhoGEF and GTPase activating protein, BCR gene, BCR activator of RhoGEF and GTPase
- External IDs: OMIM: 151410; MGI: 88141; GeneCards: BCR
Available structures
PDB	Ortholog search: PDBe RCSB
PDB	List of PDB id codes 1K1F, 2AIN
Enzyme activity
EC #	BRENDA	ExPASy	KEGG	MetaCyc
2.7.11.1	↗	↗	↗	↗

Gene location (Human)
Chr.	Chromosome 22 (human)
Band	22q11.23	Start	23,179,704 bp
Band	22q11.23	End	23,318,037 bp

Gene location (Mouse)
Chr.	Chromosome 10 (mouse)
Band	10 C1|10 38.49 cM	Start	74,896,424 bp
Band	10 C1|10 38.49 cM	End	75,020,753 bp
RNA expression pattern
Bgee	Human / Mouse (ortholog); Top expressed in: nucleus accumbens; caudate nucleus; putamen; anterior pituitary; olfactory zone of nasal mucosa; sural nerve; right frontal lobe; prefrontal cortex; amygdala; right lobe of thyroid gland / Top expressed in: olfactory tubercle; nucleus accumbens; superior frontal gyrus; globus pallidus; visual cortex; primary visual cortex; dentate gyrus of hippocampal formation granule cell; ventromedial nucleus; neural layer of retina; anterior amygdaloid area; More reference expression data
BioGPS	n/a
Gene ontology
Molecular function	transferase activity; nucleotide binding; guanyl-nucleotide exchange factor activity; kinase activity; protein serine/threonine kinase activity; protein binding; enzyme binding; protein tyrosine kinase activity; ATP binding; GTPase activator activity
Cellular component	cytoplasm; cytosol; postsynaptic membrane; membrane; postsynaptic density; plasma membrane; synapse; cell junction; extracellular exosome; protein-containing complex; Schaffer collateral - CA1 synapse; glutamatergic synapse; postsynaptic density, intracellular component; intracellular anatomical structure
Biological process	positive regulation of phagocytosis; intracellular signal transduction; neuromuscular process controlling balance; phosphorylation; regulation of cell cycle; negative regulation of blood vessel remodeling; protein phosphorylation; negative regulation of cellular extravasation; response to lipopolysaccharide; brain development; regulation of vascular permeability; negative regulation of cell migration; negative regulation of neutrophil degranulation; inner ear morphogenesis; protein autophosphorylation; platelet-derived growth factor receptor signaling pathway; regulation of Rho protein signal transduction; regulation of small GTPase mediated signal transduction; negative regulation of inflammatory response; actin cytoskeleton organization; signal transduction; peptidyl-tyrosine phosphorylation; renal system process; homeostasis of number of cells; regulation of nitrogen compound metabolic process; definitive hemopoiesis; negative regulation of respiratory burst; intracellular protein transmembrane transport; cellular response to lipopolysaccharide; negative regulation of reactive oxygen species metabolic process; positive regulation of GTPase activity; modulation of chemical synaptic transmission; small GTPase mediated signal transduction; keratinocyte differentiation; focal adhesion assembly; activation of GTPase activity
Sources:Amigo / QuickGO
Orthologs
Databases	NCBI: entry; OMA: entry
Species	Human	Mouse
Entrez	613	110279
Ensembl	ENSG00000186716	ENSMUSG00000009681
UniProt	P11274	Q6PAJ1
RefSeq (mRNA)	NM_004327; NM_021574	NM_001081412
RefSeq (protein)	NP_004318; NP_067585	NP_001074881
Location (UCSC)	Chr 22: 23.18 – 23.32 Mb	Chr 10: 74.9 – 75.02 Mb
PubMed search
- Wikidata
View/Edit Human	View/Edit Mouse

Bcr-Abl oncoprotein oligomerisation domain
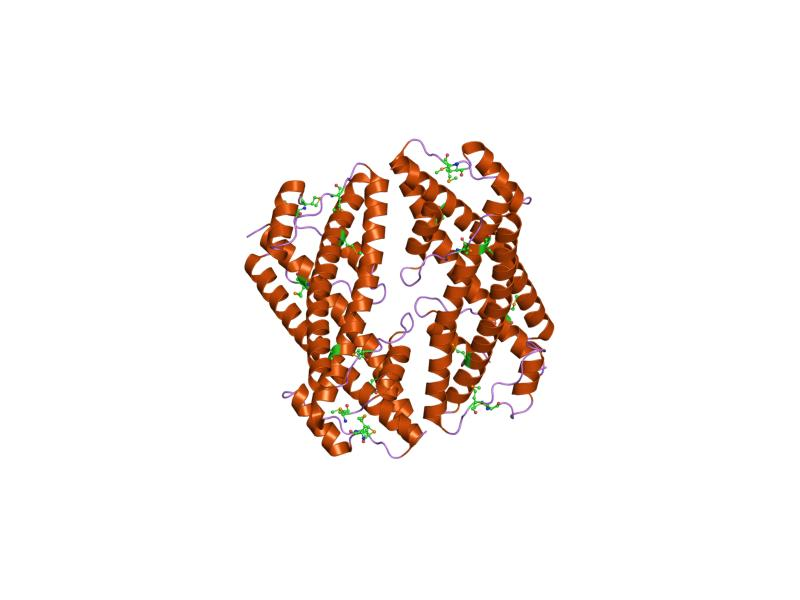
- structure of the bcr-abl oncoprotein oligomerization domain

Identifiers
- Symbol: Bcr-Abl_Oligo
- Pfam: PF09036
- InterPro: IPR015123
Available protein structures:
- PDB: IPR015123 PF09036 (ECOD; PDBsum)
- AlphaFold: IPR015123; PF09036

The breakpoint cluster region protein (BCR) also known as renal carcinoma antigen NY-REN-26 is a protein that in humans is encoded by the BCR gene. BCR is one of the two genes in the BCR-ABL fusion protein, which is associated with the Philadelphia chromosome. Two transcript variants encoding different isoforms have been found for this gene.

== Structure ==
=== Native protein ===
From the N-terminal to the C-terminal, BCR has a largely disordered kinase region (1-426), a DH domain (498-691), a PH domain (708-866), a C2 domain (893-1020), and a Rho-GAP (1054-1248) domain. The Protein Data Bank includes experimental structures for residues 1–72 (oncoprotein oligomerisation domain, see below), 1277–1271 (a C-terminal tail), 487-702 (DH), and 704-893 (PH).

=== Oncoprotein ===
Schematic of the BCR-ABL formation through chromosomal translocation

In the BCR-ABL oncoprotein, the N-terminal part of BCR is fused to the C-terminal part of ABL. The approximately 75 residues on the N-terminus functions as an oligomerisation domain essential for the oncogenicity of the BCR-ABL fusion protein. This BCR-ABL oncoprotein oligomerisation domain consists of a short N-terminal helix (alpha-1), a flexible loop and a long C-terminal helix (alpha-2). Together these form an N-shaped structure, with the loop allowing the two helices to assume a parallel orientation. The monomeric domains associate into a dimer through the formation of an antiparallel coiled coil between the alpha-2 helices and domain swapping of two alpha-1 helices, where one alpha-1 helix swings back and packs against the alpha-2 helix from the second monomer. Two dimers then associate into a tetramer. Structure-based engineering starting from the antiparallel coiled coil domain of the BCR-ABL oncoprotein (BCR30-65) resulted in a new pH-sensitive homodimeric antiparallel coiled coil.

The kinase also includes a region that binds the ABL SH2 domain.

== Function ==
Although the BCR-ABL fusion protein has been much studied, the function of the normal BCR gene product is still not clear. The protein has serine/threonine kinase activity and is a guanine nucleotide exchange factor for the Rho family of GTPases including RhoA.

BCR is a paralog of ABR, RhoGEF and GTPase activating protein. Both are GTPase-activating proteins selective for Rac. Despite their "GTPase-activating" domain they actually reduce the activity of Rac. They keep mature innate immune system cells from becoming overactive.

BCR knockout mice are viable, fertile, and free of obvious behavioral or physical abnormalities. They are however much more sensitive to lipopolysaccharide in blood, reacting with neutrophilia and septic shock. Their neutrophils are more active than those of normal mice. BCR knockout also disrupts gut movement and brain development in mice.

== Interactions ==
The BCR protein has been shown to interact with:

- Abl gene,
- CD117,
- CRKL
- FES,
- Grb2,
- GRB10,
- HCK,
- MLLT4,
- PXN,
- PIK3CG,
- PTPN6,
- PTPRT(PTPrho)
- SOS1, and
- XPB.

== Clinical significance ==
A reciprocal translocation between chromosomes 22 and 9 produces the Philadelphia chromosome, which is often found in patients with chronic myelogenous leukemia. The chromosome 22 breakpoint for this translocation is located within the BCR gene. The translocation produces a fusion protein that is encoded by sequence from both BCR and ABL, the gene at the chromosome 9 breakpoint.

== See also ==
- Abl gene
