= MPDZ =

Protein-coding gene in the species Homo sapiens

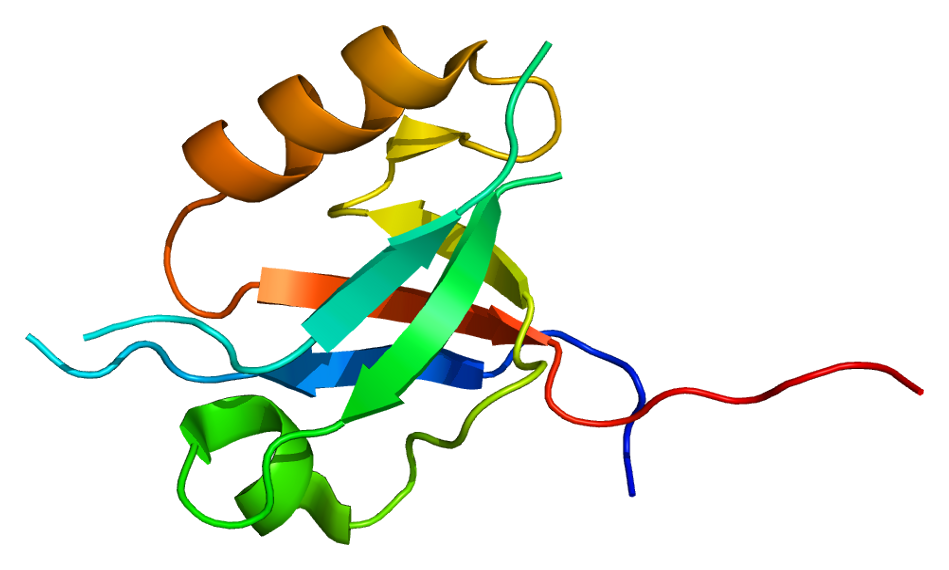

Identifiers
- Aliases: MPDZ, HYC2, MUPP1, multiple PDZ domain crumbs cell polarity complex component
- External IDs: OMIM: 603785; MGI: 1343489; GeneCards: MPDZ
Available structures
PDB	Ortholog search: PDBe RCSB
PDB	List of PDB id codes 2FCF, 2FNE, 2IWN, 2IWO, 2IWP, 2IWQ, 2O2T, 2OPG, 2QG1

Gene location (Human)
Chr.	Chromosome 9 (human)
Band	9p23	Start	13,105,704 bp
Band	9p23	End	13,279,590 bp

Gene location (Mouse)
Chr.	Chromosome 4 (mouse)
Band	4 C3|4 38.0 cM	Start	81,278,500 bp
Band	4 C3|4 38.0 cM	End	81,442,815 bp
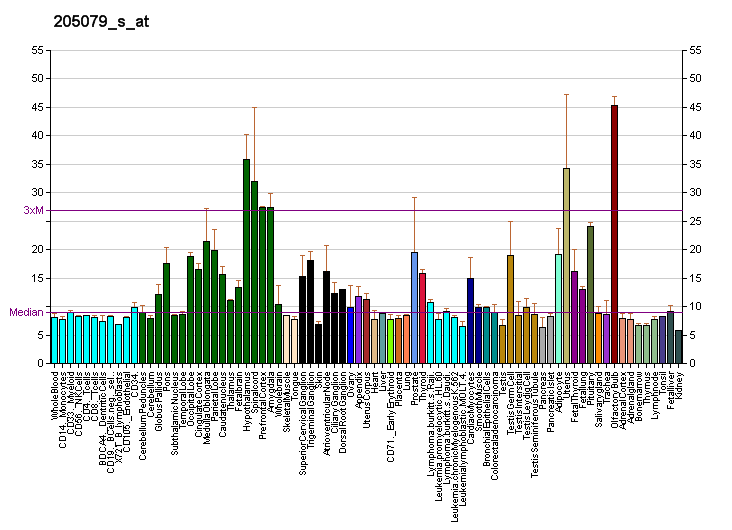

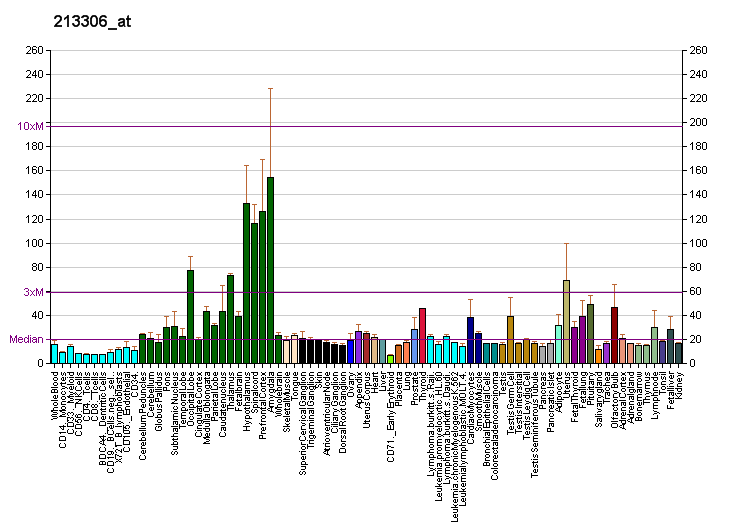
RNA expression pattern
Bgee	Human / Mouse (ortholog); Top expressed in: Achilles tendon; corpus callosum; ventricular zone; subthalamic nucleus; inferior ganglion of vagus nerve; Epithelium of choroid plexus; external globus pallidus; superior vestibular nucleus; vena cava; pars reticulata / Top expressed in: epithelium of lens; tail of embryo; vestibular sensory epithelium; digastric muscle; neural layer of retina; sciatic nerve; genital tubercle; vastus lateralis muscle; iris; efferent ductule; More reference expression data
BioGPS	More reference expression data
Gene ontology
Molecular function	protein C-terminus binding; protein binding
Cellular component	cytoplasm; neuron projection; cell junction; apicolateral plasma membrane; dendrite; postsynaptic membrane; plasma membrane; cell projection; synapse; apical plasma membrane; Schmidt-Lanterman incisure; cytoplasmic vesicle; postsynaptic density; membrane; bicellular tight junction
Biological process	cell adhesion; viral process
Sources:Amigo / QuickGO
Orthologs
Databases	NCBI: entry; OMA: entry
Species	Human	Mouse
Entrez	8777	17475
Ensembl	ENSG00000107186	ENSMUSG00000028402
UniProt	O75970	Q8VBX6
RefSeq (mRNA)	NM_001261406; NM_001261407; NM_003829; NM_001330637	NM_010820; NM_001305284; NM_001305286
RefSeq (protein)	NP_001248335; NP_001248336; NP_001317566; NP_003820; NP_001362342 NP_001362345; NP_001362346; NP_001362347; NP_001362348; NP_001362349; NP_001362350; NP_001362351; NP_001362352; NP_001362353; NP_001362354; NP_001362355; NP_001362356; NP_001365707	NP_001292213; NP_001292215; NP_034950
Location (UCSC)	Chr 9: 13.11 – 13.28 Mb	Chr 4: 81.28 – 81.44 Mb
PubMed search
- Wikidata
View/Edit Human	View/Edit Mouse

Multiple PDZ domain protein is a protein that in humans is encoded by the MPDZ gene.

== Interactions ==
MPDZ has been shown to interact with:

- 5-HT2C receptor,
- CD117, and
- PLEKHA1.
