= ABR, RhoGEF and GTPase activating protein =

Protein-coding gene in the species Homo sapiens

ABR

Identifiers
- Aliases: ABR, MDB, active BCR-related, RhoGEF and GTPase activating protein, ABR activator of RhoGEF and GTPase
- External IDs: OMIM: 600365; MGI: 107771; GeneCards: ABR

Gene location (Human)
Chr.	Chromosome 17 (human)
Band	17p13.3	Start	1,003,519 bp
Band	17p13.3	End	1,229,738 bp

Gene location (Mouse)
Chr.	Chromosome 11 (mouse)
Band	11 B5|11 45.92 cM	Start	76,307,560 bp
Band	11 B5|11 45.92 cM	End	76,514,384 bp
RNA expression pattern
Bgee	Human / Mouse (ortholog); Top expressed in: superior frontal gyrus; right frontal lobe; anterior cingulate cortex; temporal lobe; primary visual cortex; amygdala; right uterine tube; dorsolateral prefrontal cortex; nucleus accumbens; prefrontal cortex / Top expressed in: dentate gyrus of hippocampal formation granule cell; superior frontal gyrus; primary visual cortex; entorhinal cortex; perirhinal cortex; granulocyte; zygote; anterior amygdaloid area; CA3 field; lateral septal nucleus; More reference expression data
BioGPS	n/a
Gene ontology
Molecular function	guanyl-nucleotide exchange factor activity; GTPase activator activity; protein binding
Cellular component	cytosol; membrane; plasma membrane; Schaffer collateral - CA1 synapse; glutamatergic synapse; postsynaptic density, intracellular component; intracellular anatomical structure
Biological process	positive regulation of phagocytosis; intracellular signal transduction; neuromuscular process controlling balance; small GTPase mediated signal transduction; negative regulation of blood vessel remodeling; negative regulation of cellular extravasation; response to lipopolysaccharide; regulation of vascular permeability; brain development; negative regulation of cell migration; negative regulation of neutrophil degranulation; inner ear morphogenesis; positive regulation of apoptotic process; regulation of Rho protein signal transduction; regulation of small GTPase mediated signal transduction; negative regulation of inflammatory response; actin cytoskeleton organization; signal transduction; positive regulation of GTPase activity; G protein-coupled receptor signaling pathway; modulation of chemical synaptic transmission; activation of GTPase activity
Sources:Amigo / QuickGO
Orthologs
Databases	NCBI: entry; OMA: entry
Species	Human	Mouse
Entrez	29	109934
Ensembl	ENSG00000159842; ENSG00000278741; ENSG00000276016	ENSMUSG00000017631
UniProt	Q12979	Q5SSL4
RefSeq (mRNA)	NM_001092; NM_001159746; NM_001256847; NM_001282149; NM_021962 NM_001322840; NM_001322841; NM_001322842	NM_001291186; NM_198018; NM_198894; NM_198895; NM_001346670 NM_001363379
RefSeq (protein)	NP_001083; NP_001153218; NP_001243776; NP_001269078; NP_001309769 NP_001309770; NP_001309771; NP_068781	NP_001278115; NP_001333599; NP_932135; NP_942597; NP_942598 NP_001350308
Location (UCSC)	Chr 17: 1 – 1.23 Mb	Chr 11: 76.31 – 76.51 Mb
PubMed search
- Wikidata
View/Edit Human	View/Edit Mouse

Active breakpoint cluster region-related protein is a protein that in humans is encoded by the ABR gene.

== Gene ==
The ABR activator of RhoGEF and GTPase, also symbolized as ABR, gene has a reported 13 alternatively spliced transcript variants. This gene is found to have ubiquitous expression within 23 human tissues, including the heart and brain. The protein encoded by ABR shares homology with the Breakpoint Cluster Region (BCR) gene located on chromosome 22 and has shown to share similar protein functions.

== Function ==
The protein encoded by this gene contains a GTPase-activating protein domain, a domain found in members of the Rho family of GTP-binding protein. They are selective for Rac. Despite their "GTPase-activating" domain they actually reduce the activity of Rac. They keep mature innate immune system cells from becoming overactive.

The ABR is an inhibitor of ras-related C3 botulinum toxin substrate 1 (RAC1), a protein found to influence cell growth, motility of the cell, and maintain adhesion to neighboring epithelial cells. Recent papers suggest ABR has tumor suppressor properties in leukemia because of its role as a RAC1 inhibitor and is being researched as a potential therapy treatment in leukemia patients. Other studies suggest ABR plays an important role in vestibular morphogenesis.

=== Knockout phenotype ===
Double-knockout of ABR and BCR in vitro causes macrophage overactivation. Double-knockout of ABR and BCR in mice lead to dysfunctional astroglia and abnormal postnatal development of the cerebellum.

Single ABR and single BCR knockout mice are each more sensitive to intraperitoneal LPS than normal mice and recover more slowly. Double knockout mice failed to make any recovery and all died within 2 days.
