= PLEKHA1 =

Protein-coding gene in the species Homo sapiens

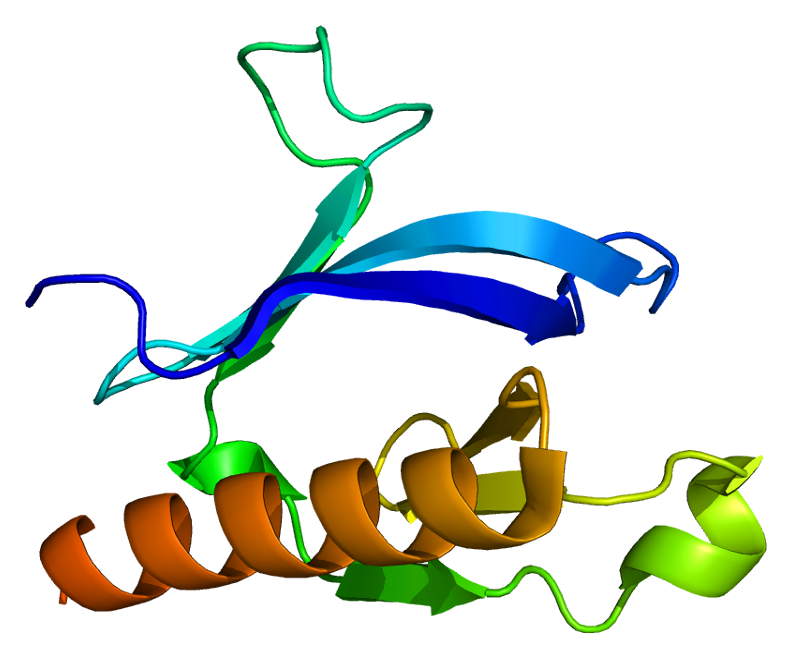

Identifiers
- Aliases: PLEKHA1, TAPP1, pleckstrin homology domain containing A1
- External IDs: OMIM: 607772; MGI: 2442213; GeneCards: PLEKHA1
Available structures
PDB	Ortholog search: PDBe RCSB
PDB	List of PDB id codes 1EAZ

Gene location (Human)
Chr.	Chromosome 10 (human)
Band	10q26.13	Start	122,374,696 bp
Band	10q26.13	End	122,442,602 bp

Gene location (Mouse)
Chr.	Chromosome 7 (mouse)
Band	7|7 F3	Start	130,467,486 bp
Band	7|7 F3	End	130,515,042 bp
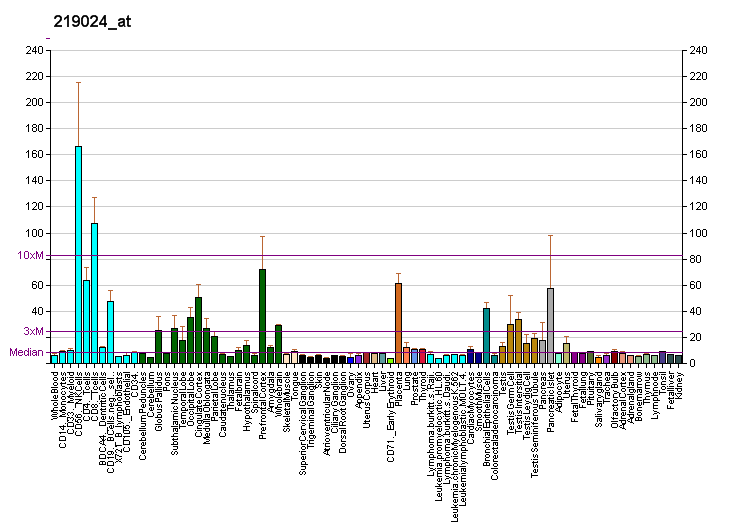
RNA expression pattern
Bgee	Human / Mouse (ortholog); Top expressed in: skin of thigh; sperm; Brodmann area 23; skin of hip; middle temporal gyrus; postcentral gyrus; gingival epithelium; synovial joint; endothelial cell; primary visual cortex / Top expressed in: neural layer of retina; decidua; gastrula; ciliary body; olfactory bulb; iris; pineal gland; CA3 field; perirhinal cortex; sciatic nerve; More reference expression data
BioGPS	More reference expression data
Gene ontology
Molecular function	PDZ domain binding; phosphatidylinositol-3,4-bisphosphate binding; protein binding; lipid binding
Cellular component	cytoplasm; membrane; nucleoplasm; ruffle membrane; extracellular exosome; nucleus; cytosol; plasma membrane
Biological process	B cell receptor signaling pathway; roof of mouth development; negative regulation of protein kinase B signaling; luteinization; Leydig cell differentiation; estrogen metabolic process; androgen metabolic process; ruffle organization; multicellular organism growth; establishment of protein localization; skeletal system morphogenesis; post-embryonic development; female gonad development; spermatogenesis; phosphatidylinositol 3-kinase signaling; platelet-derived growth factor receptor signaling pathway; face morphogenesis; cellular response to hydrogen peroxide; phosphatidylinositol biosynthetic process
Sources:Amigo / QuickGO
Orthologs
Databases	NCBI: entry; OMA: entry
Species	Human	Mouse
Entrez	59338	101476
Ensembl	ENSG00000107679	ENSMUSG00000040268
UniProt	Q9HB21	Q8BUL6
RefSeq (mRNA)	NM_001001974; NM_001195608; NM_021622; NM_001330178	NM_133942; NM_001346515; NM_001357696; NM_001382373; NM_001382374 NM_001382375; NM_001382376; NM_001382377; NM_001382378; NM_001382379
RefSeq (protein)	NP_001001974; NP_001182537; NP_001317107; NP_067635; NP_001364159 NP_001364160; NP_001364161; NP_001364163; NP_001364164; NP_001364166; NP_001364167; NP_001364169; NP_001364170; NP_001364171; NP_001364172; NP_001364173; NP_001364174; NP_001364175; NP_001364176; NP_001364177; NP_001364178; NP_001364179; NP_001364180; NP_001364181; NP_001364182; NP_001364183; NP_001364184; NP_001364185; NP_001364186; NP_001364187	NP_001333444; NP_598703; NP_001344625; NP_001369302; NP_001369303 NP_001369304; NP_001369305; NP_001369306; NP_001369307; NP_001369308
Location (UCSC)	Chr 10: 122.37 – 122.44 Mb	Chr 7: 130.47 – 130.52 Mb
PubMed search
- Wikidata
View/Edit Human	View/Edit Mouse

Pleckstrin homology domain-containing family A member 1 is a protein that in humans is encoded by the PLEKHA1 gene.

== Interactions ==
PLEKHA1 has been shown to interact with MPDZ.
