= SH2B3 =

Protein-coding gene in the species Homo sapiens

Identifiers
- Aliases: SH2B3, IDDM20, LNK, SH2B adaptor protein 3
- External IDs: OMIM: 605093; MGI: 893598; GeneCards: SH2B3

Gene location (Human)
Chr.	Chromosome 12 (human)
Band	12q24.12	Start	111,405,923 bp
Band	12q24.12	End	111,451,623 bp

Gene location (Mouse)
Chr.	Chromosome 5 (mouse)
Band	5 F|5 61.99 cM	Start	121,953,551 bp
Band	5 F|5 61.99 cM	End	121,975,709 bp
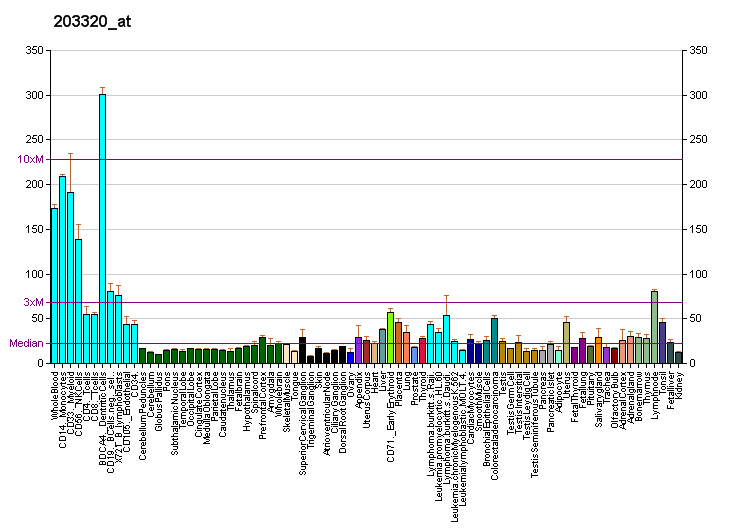
RNA expression pattern
Bgee	Human / Mouse (ortholog); Top expressed in: monocyte; granulocyte; right ventricle; myocardium of left ventricle; spleen; secondary oocyte; blood; lower lobe of lung; apex of heart; appendix / Top expressed in: granulocyte; spleen; blood; mesenteric lymph nodes; stroma of bone marrow; hand; left lung lobe; external carotid artery; seminiferous tubule; internal carotid artery; More reference expression data
BioGPS	More reference expression data
Gene ontology
Molecular function	protein binding; signaling adaptor activity; transmembrane receptor protein tyrosine kinase adaptor activity; stem cell factor receptor binding; protein tyrosine kinase binding
Cellular component	cytosol; plasma membrane
Biological process	cell differentiation; positive regulation of signal transduction; intracellular signal transduction; blood coagulation; embryonic hemopoiesis; signal transduction; hemopoiesis; transmembrane receptor protein tyrosine kinase signaling pathway; neutrophil homeostasis; negative regulation of cell population proliferation; monocyte homeostasis; megakaryocyte development; cellular response to interleukin-3; thrombopoietin-mediated signaling pathway; negative regulation of tyrosine phosphorylation of STAT protein; negative regulation of MAP kinase activity; negative regulation of receptor signaling pathway via JAK-STAT; erythrocyte development; negative regulation of protein kinase B signaling; negative regulation of response to cytokine stimulus; negative regulation of chemokine-mediated signaling pathway; negative regulation of platelet aggregation; negative regulation of Kit signaling pathway; cellular response to chemokine
Sources:Amigo / QuickGO
Orthologs
Databases	NCBI: entry; OMA: entry
Species	Human	Mouse
Entrez	10019	16923
Ensembl	ENSG00000111252	ENSMUSG00000042594
UniProt	Q9UQQ2	O09039
RefSeq (mRNA)	NM_001291424; NM_005475	NM_008507; NM_001306126; NM_001306127; NM_001306128
RefSeq (protein)	NP_001278353; NP_005466	NP_001293055; NP_001293056; NP_001293057; NP_032533
Location (UCSC)	Chr 12: 111.41 – 111.45 Mb	Chr 5: 121.95 – 121.98 Mb
PubMed search
- Wikidata
View/Edit Human	View/Edit Mouse

SH2B adapter protein 3 (SH2B3), also known as lymphocyte adapter protein (LNK), is a protein that in humans is encoded by the SH2B3 gene on chromosome 12. SH2B3 is ubiquitously expressed in many tissues and cell types. LNK functions as a regulator in signaling pathways relating to hematopoiesis, inflammation, and cell migration. As a result, it is involved in blood diseases, autoimmune disorders, and vascular disease. The SH2B3 gene also contains one of 27 SNPs associated with increased risk of coronary artery disease.

== Structure ==
=== Gene ===
The SH2B3 gene resides on chromosome 12 at the band 12q24 and contains 12 exons.

=== Protein ===
This protein belongs to the Src homology 2-B (SH2B) adapter family. LNK contains 3 functional domains: a C-terminal Src homology 2 (SH2) domain, a pleckstrin homology (PH) domain, and a dimerization domain. The SH2 domain spans approximately 100 amino acid residues and binds phosphotyrosine-containing proteins such as kinases. The PH domain spans approximately 120 amino acid residues and binds the phosphatidylinositol lipids found in the cell membrane. Thus, it is proposed to target the protein to the cell membrane, where LNK performs its regulatory function. The dimerization domain spans approximately 70 amino acid residues and contains a central phenylalanine zipper motif, which is formed by stacking of the aromatic side chains from 10 phenylalanine residues. This motif is responsible for facilitating the homo- or heterodimerization of SH2-B family proteins as a mechanism for regulating signal transduction. In addition to these domains, LNK possesses a proline-rich region that contains a minimal consensus sequence of Pro-X-X-Pro, which is recognized by the SH3 domain of another protein, as well as putative tyrosine phosphorylation motifs.

== Function ==
LNK is widely expressed in human tissues, with the highest expression in hematopoietic cells. LNK negatively controls the activation of several receptors, including stem cell factor receptor (c-kit), thrombopoietin receptor (MPL), erythropoietin receptor (EPOR), platelet-derived growth factor receptor (PDGFR), macrophage colony-stimulating factor receptor (c-Fms), and their related pathways. LNK is a negative regulator of signaling in endothelial cells, such as the TNF signaling pathway, especially in inflammation. LNK has been found to function as a negative regulator in lymphopoiesis, megakaryopoiesis, erythropoiesis as well as HSC expansion by moderating growth factor and cytokine receptor-mediated signaling. The overexpression of LNK led to the inhibition of anti-CD3 mediated NF-AT-Luc activation, indicating that LNK is involved in the mechanism of T cell-negative regulation. In addition to its role in progenitor cell growth and commitment, LNK appears to be involved in cell motility and cellular interactions. LNK modulates crosstalk between integrin- and cytokine-mediated signals, thus controlling thrombopoiesis. LNK facilitates integrin aIIbb3 phosphorylation and signaling in order to promote platelet cytoskeleton rearrangement and spreading, and thus stabilizes thrombosis formation.

== Interactions ==
SH2B3 has been shown to interact with Filamin.

== Clinical significance ==
In humans, genetic linkage analyses, genome-wide association studies of single nucleotide polymorphisms, copy number variation surveys, and mutation screenings found the human chromosomal 12q24 locus, with the SH2B3 gene at its core, to be associated with an exceptionally wide spectrum of disease susceptibilities. For example, hematopoietic traits of red and white blood cells (like erythrocytosis and myeloproliferative disease), autoimmune disorders, and vascular pathology have been reported. Moreover, co-expression of the interleukin-7 receptor together with LNK was carefully studied, and it was concluded that interleukin-7 receptor expression was significantly more highly expressed than LNK in B-cell acute leukemic lymphoma. This observation distinguished a novel subset of high-risk B-cell acute lymphoblastic lymphoma with a potential therapy targeting the interleukin-7 signaling pathway. Another study indicated that LNK can suppress the interleukin-7/JAK/STAT signaling pathway to restrict pre B-cell progenitor expansion and leukemia development, which provided a pathogenic mechanism and a potential therapeutic approach for B-cell acute lymphoblastic leukemia with SH2B3 gene mutations.

=== Clinical marker ===
A multi-locus genetic risk score study based on a combination of 27 loci, including the SH2B3 gene, identified individuals at increased risk for both incident and recurrent coronary artery disease events, as well as an enhanced clinical benefit from statin therapy. The study was based on a community cohort study (the Malmo Diet and Cancer study) and four additional randomized controlled trials of primary prevention cohorts (JUPITER and ASCOT) and secondary prevention cohorts (CARE and PROVE IT-TIMI 22).
