= PIK3AP1 =

Protein-coding gene in the species Homo sapiens

Identifiers
- Aliases: PIK3AP1, BCAP, phosphoinositide-3-kinase adaptor protein 1
- External IDs: OMIM: 607942; MGI: 1933177; HomoloGene: 12848; GeneCards: PIK3AP1; OMA:PIK3AP1 - orthologs

Gene location (Human)
Chr.	Chromosome 10 (human)
Band	10q24.1	Start	96,593,315 bp
Band	10q24.1	End	96,720,514 bp

Gene location (Mouse)
Chr.	Chromosome 19 (mouse)
Band	19|19 C3	Start	41,260,816 bp
Band	19|19 C3	End	41,373,541 bp
RNA expression pattern
Bgee	Human / Mouse (ortholog); Top expressed in: parotid gland; pancreatic epithelial cell; monocyte; pancreatic ductal cell; mucosa of ileum; appendix; blood; trabecular bone; bone marrow; granulocyte / Top expressed in: granulocyte; submandibular gland; spleen; vestibular sensory epithelium; blood; Paneth cell; liver; right lung lobe; vestibular membrane of cochlear duct; lymph node; More reference expression data
BioGPS	n/a
Gene ontology
Molecular function	phosphatidylinositol 3-kinase regulatory subunit binding; identical protein binding; phosphatidylinositol-4,5-bisphosphate 3-kinase activity; signaling receptor binding
Cellular component	cytoplasm; cytosol; plasma membrane; membrane
Biological process	positive regulation of phosphatidylinositol 3-kinase signaling; toll-like receptor 9 signaling pathway; toll-like receptor 2 signaling pathway; toll-like receptor 4 signaling pathway; toll-like receptor 7 signaling pathway; regulation of inflammatory response; phosphatidylinositol phosphate biosynthetic process; positive regulation of protein kinase B signaling
Sources:Amigo / QuickGO
Orthologs
Species	Human	Mouse
Entrez	118788	83490
Ensembl	ENSG00000155629	ENSMUSG00000025017
UniProt	Q6ZUJ8	Q9EQ32
RefSeq (mRNA)	NM_152309	NM_031376
RefSeq (protein)	NP_689522	NP_113553
Location (UCSC)	Chr 10: 96.59 – 96.72 Mb	Chr 19: 41.26 – 41.37 Mb
PubMed search
- Wikidata
View/Edit Human	View/Edit Mouse

Phosphoinositide 3-kinase adapter protein 1 is an enzyme that in humans is encoded by the PIK3AP1 gene.
