= LIMS1 =

Protein-coding gene in the species Homo sapiens

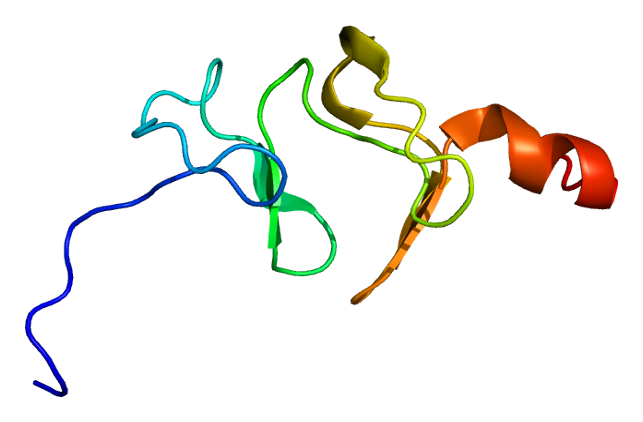

Identifiers
- Aliases: LIMS1, PINCH, PINCH-1, PINCH1, LIM zinc finger domain containing 1
- External IDs: OMIM: 602567; MGI: 1195263; GeneCards: LIMS1
Available structures
PDB	Ortholog search: PDBe RCSB
PDB	List of PDB id codes 1G47, 1NYP, 1U5S, 2COR, 2D8X, 2KBX, 3F6Q, 4HI8, 4HI9

Gene location (Human)
Chr.	Chromosome 2 (human)
Band	2q12.3	Start	108,534,355 bp
Band	2q12.3	End	108,687,246 bp

Gene location (Mouse)
Chr.	Chromosome 10 (mouse)
Band	10 B4|10 29.31 cM	Start	58,159,288 bp
Band	10 B4|10 29.31 cM	End	58,260,513 bp
RNA expression pattern
Bgee	Human / Mouse (ortholog); Top expressed in: monocyte; stromal cell of endometrium; gastrocnemius muscle; ascending aorta; muscle of thigh; decidua; tail of epididymis; Descending thoracic aorta; epithelium of colon; Skeletal muscle tissue of biceps brachii / Top expressed in: granulocyte; left lung lobe; genital tubercle; cardiac muscle tissue of left ventricle; sciatic nerve; soleus muscle; atrioventricular valve; corneal stroma; atrium; tail of embryo; More reference expression data
BioGPS	n/a
Gene ontology
Molecular function	metal ion binding; protein binding; protein kinase binding; zinc ion binding
Cellular component	cytosol; membrane; cell-cell junction; focal adhesion; plasma membrane; cell junction; perinuclear region of cytoplasm; protein-containing complex; cytoplasm
Biological process	cellular response to transforming growth factor beta stimulus; establishment of protein localization; positive regulation of GTPase activity; positive regulation of substrate adhesion-dependent cell spreading; positive regulation of gene expression; epithelial to mesenchymal transition; positive regulation of focal adhesion assembly; regulation of epithelial cell proliferation; negative regulation of transcription, DNA-templated; cell junction assembly; positive regulation of cell-substrate adhesion; tumor necrosis factor-mediated signaling pathway; protein heterooligomerization; positive regulation of NIK/NF-kappaB signaling; cell-cell junction organization; cell-cell adhesion; positive regulation of integrin-mediated signaling pathway
Sources:Amigo / QuickGO
Orthologs
Databases	NCBI: entry; OMA: entry
Species	Human	Mouse
Entrez	3987	110829
Ensembl	ENSG00000169756	ENSMUSG00000019920
UniProt	P48059	Q99JW4
RefSeq (mRNA)	NM_001193482; NM_001193483; NM_001193484; NM_001193485; NM_001193488 NM_004987	NM_001193303; NM_026148; NM_201242; NM_001346676; NM_001359115 NM_001359116
RefSeq (protein)	NP_001180411; NP_001180412; NP_001180413; NP_001180414; NP_001180417 NP_004978; NP_001358423; NP_001358424; NP_001358425; NP_001358426; NP_001358427; NP_001358428; NP_001358429	NP_001180232; NP_001333605; NP_080424; NP_957694; NP_001346044 NP_001346045
Location (UCSC)	Chr 2: 108.53 – 108.69 Mb	Chr 10: 58.16 – 58.26 Mb
PubMed search
- Wikidata
View/Edit Human	View/Edit Mouse

LIM and senescent cell antigen-like-containing domain protein 1 is a protein that in humans is encoded by the LIMS1 gene.

== Function ==
The protein encoded by this gene is an adaptor protein which contains five LIM domains, or double zinc fingers. The protein is likely involved in integrin signaling through its LIM domain-mediated interaction with integrin-linked kinase, found in focal adhesion plaques. It is also thought to act as a bridge linking integrin-linked kinase to NCK adaptor protein 2, which is involved in growth factor receptor kinase signaling pathways. Its localization to the periphery of spreading cells also suggests that this protein may play a role in integrin-mediated cell adhesion or spreading.

== Interactions ==
LIMS1 has been shown to interact with Integrin-linked kinase and NCK2.
