= SUPT6H =

Protein-coding gene in the species Homo sapiens

Identifiers
- Aliases: SUPT6H, SPT6, SPT6H, emb-5, SPT6 homolog, histone chaperone, SPT6 homolog, histone chaperone and transcription elongation factor
- External IDs: OMIM: 601333; MGI: 107726; GeneCards: SUPT6H

Gene location (Human)
Chr.	Chromosome 17 (human)
Band	17q11.2	Start	28,662,198 bp
Band	17q11.2	End	28,702,679 bp

Gene location (Mouse)
Chr.	Chromosome 11 (mouse)
Band	11 B5|11 46.74 cM	Start	78,097,572 bp
Band	11 B5|11 46.74 cM	End	78,136,813 bp
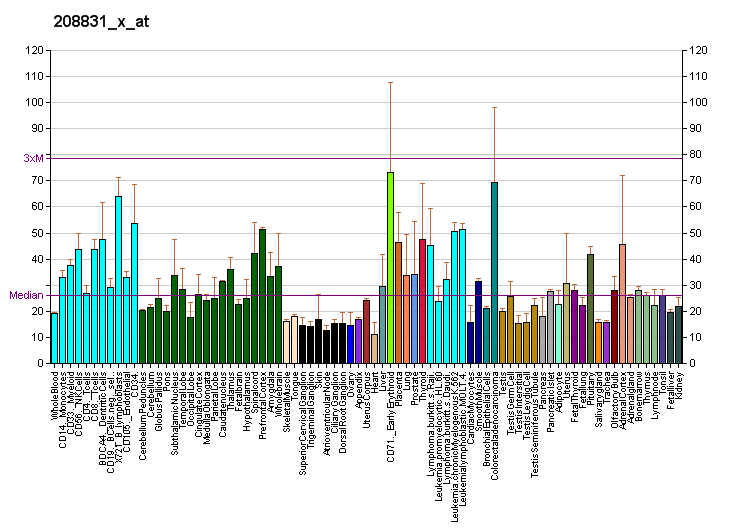

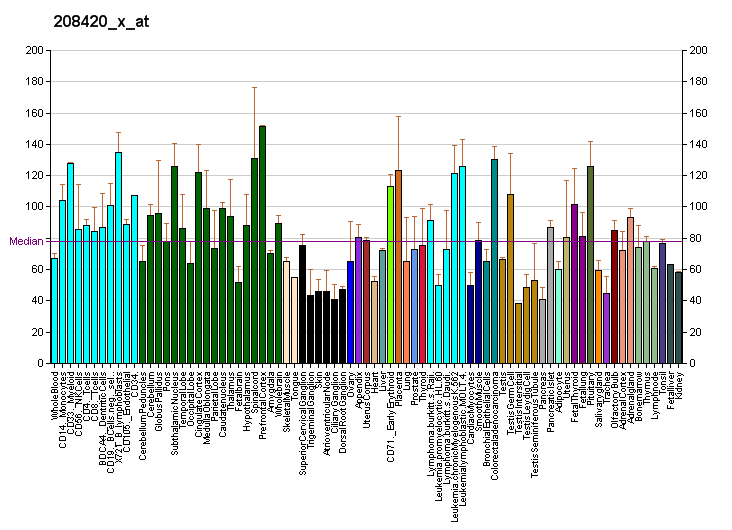
RNA expression pattern
Bgee	Human / Mouse (ortholog); Top expressed in: sural nerve; epithelium of colon; stromal cell of endometrium; gastric mucosa; anterior pituitary; skin of leg; granulocyte; gastrocnemius muscle; muscle layer of sigmoid colon; left adrenal cortex / Top expressed in: dentate gyrus of hippocampal formation granule cell; neural layer of retina; tail of embryo; zygote; primary visual cortex; yolk sac; superior frontal gyrus; genital tubercle; otic vesicle; muscle of thigh; More reference expression data
BioGPS	More reference expression data
Gene ontology
Molecular function	DNA binding; DNA-binding transcription factor activity; histone binding; protein binding; nucleic acid binding; nucleosome binding; RNA binding
Cellular component	nucleus; nucleoplasm; transcription elongation factor complex
Biological process	chromatin remodeling; negative regulation of histone H3-K27 methylation; mRNA transport; regulation of transcription, DNA-templated; regulation of muscle cell differentiation; regulation of mRNA export from nucleus; regulation of transcription by RNA polymerase II; mRNA processing; regulation of DNA-templated transcription, elongation; transcription, DNA-templated; RNA splicing; regulation of isotype switching; viral process; nucleobase-containing compound metabolic process; positive regulation of transcription elongation from RNA polymerase II promoter; transcription by RNA polymerase II; transcription elongation from RNA polymerase II promoter; nucleosome organization; mRNA transcription by RNA polymerase II; regulation of mRNA processing; transport; blastocyst formation
Sources:Amigo / QuickGO
Orthologs
Databases	NCBI: entry; OMA: entry
Species	Human	Mouse
Entrez	6830	20926
Ensembl	ENSG00000109111	ENSMUSG00000002052
UniProt	Q7KZ85	Q62383
RefSeq (mRNA)	NM_003170; NM_001320755	NM_009297
RefSeq (protein)	NP_001307684; NP_003161	NP_033323
Location (UCSC)	Chr 17: 28.66 – 28.7 Mb	Chr 11: 78.1 – 78.14 Mb
PubMed search
- Wikidata
View/Edit Human	View/Edit Mouse

Transcription elongation factor SPT6 is a protein that in humans is encoded by the SUPT6H gene.
