= Megakaryocyte-associated tyrosine kinase =

Protein-coding gene in the species Homo sapiens

MATK
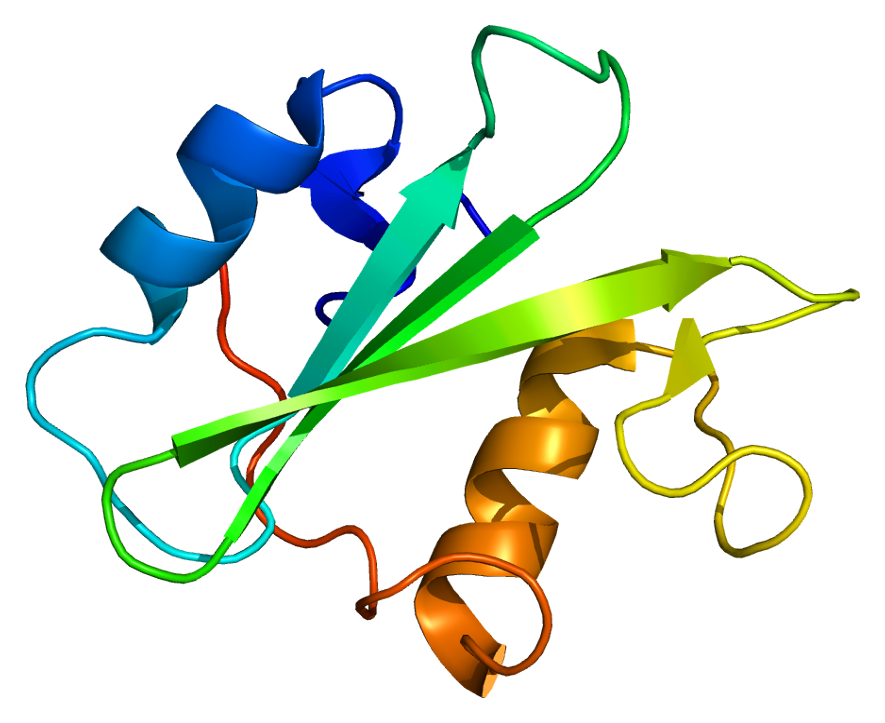

Identifiers
- Aliases: MATK, CHK, CTK, HHYLTK, HYL, HYLTK, Lsk, Megakaryocyte-associated tyrosine kinase
- External IDs: OMIM: 600038; MGI: 99259; GeneCards: MATK
Available structures
PDB	Ortholog search: PDBe RCSB
PDB	List of PDB id codes 1JWO, 1X6G, 3US4
Enzyme activity
EC #	BRENDA	ExPASy	KEGG	MetaCyc
2.7.10.2	↗	↗	↗	↗

Gene location (Human)
Chr.	Chromosome 19 (human)
Band	19p13.3	Start	3,777,970 bp
Band	19p13.3	End	3,802,129 bp

Gene location (Mouse)
Chr.	Chromosome 10 (mouse)
Band	10 39.72 cM|10 C1	Start	81,088,769 bp
Band	10 39.72 cM|10 C1	End	81,099,199 bp
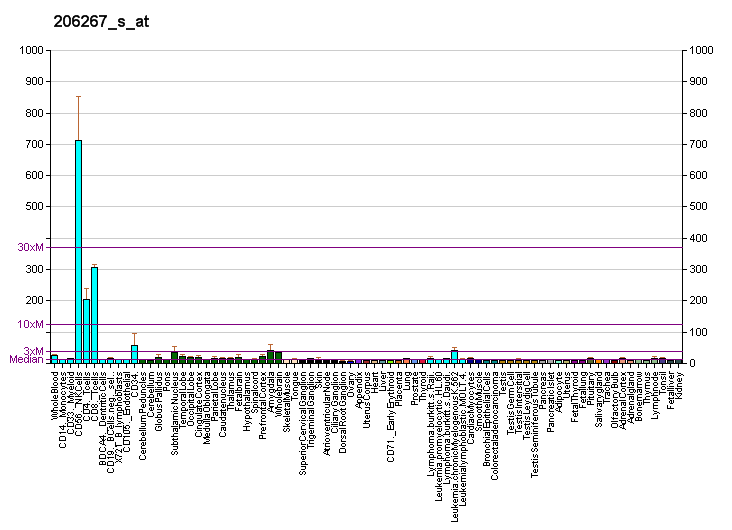
RNA expression pattern
Bgee	Human / Mouse (ortholog); Top expressed in: granulocyte; cingulate gyrus; anterior cingulate cortex; right frontal lobe; Brodmann area 9; amygdala; prefrontal cortex; nucleus accumbens; putamen; caudate nucleus / Top expressed in: superior frontal gyrus; primary visual cortex; dentate gyrus of hippocampal formation granule cell; lumbar subsegment of spinal cord; entorhinal cortex; perirhinal cortex; hippocampus proper; olfactory tubercle; subiculum; lateral septal nucleus; More reference expression data
BioGPS	More reference expression data
Gene ontology
Molecular function	transferase activity; nucleotide binding; protein kinase activity; non-membrane spanning protein tyrosine kinase activity; kinase activity; protein binding; protein tyrosine kinase activity; signaling receptor binding; ATP binding
Cellular component	cytoplasm; cytosol; membrane; extrinsic component of cytoplasmic side of plasma membrane
Biological process	cell differentiation; phosphorylation; transmembrane receptor protein tyrosine kinase signaling pathway; protein phosphorylation; positive regulation of cell population proliferation; peptidyl-tyrosine autophosphorylation; mesoderm development; cell population proliferation; innate immune response; ERBB2 signaling pathway; peptidyl-tyrosine phosphorylation; regulation of cell population proliferation
Sources:Amigo / QuickGO
Orthologs
Databases	NCBI: entry; OMA: entry
Species	Human	Mouse
Entrez	4145	17179
Ensembl	ENSG00000007264	ENSMUSG00000004933
UniProt	P42679	P41242
RefSeq (mRNA)	NM_002378; NM_139354; NM_139355	NM_001285853; NM_001285854; NM_001285855; NM_010768
RefSeq (protein)	NP_002369; NP_647611; NP_647612	NP_001272782; NP_001272783; NP_001272784; NP_034898
Location (UCSC)	Chr 19: 3.78 – 3.8 Mb	Chr 10: 81.09 – 81.1 Mb
PubMed search
- Wikidata
View/Edit Human	View/Edit Mouse

Megakaryocyte-associated tyrosine-protein kinase is an enzyme that in humans is encoded by the MATK gene.

The protein encoded by this gene has amino acid sequence similarity to Csk tyrosine kinase and has the structural features of the CSK subfamily: SRC homology SH2 and SH3 domains, a catalytic domain, a unique N terminus, lack of myristylation signals, lack of a negative regulatory phosphorylation site, and lack of an autophosphorylation site. This protein is thought to play a significant role in the signal transduction of hematopoietic cells. It is able to phosphorylate and inactivate Src family kinases, and may play an inhibitory role in the control of T-cell proliferation. This protein might be involved in signaling in some cases of breast cancer. Three alternatively spliced transcript variants that encode different isoforms have been described for this gene.

== Interactions ==
Megakaryocyte-associated tyrosine kinase has been shown to interact with CD117 and TrkA.
