= SOCS6 =

Protein-coding gene in the species Homo sapiens

Identifiers
- Aliases: SOCS6, CIS-4, CIS4, HSPC060, SOCS-4, SOCS-6, SOCS4, SSI4, STAI4, STATI4, suppressor of cytokine signaling 6
- External IDs: OMIM: 605118; MGI: 1924885; GeneCards: SOCS6
Available structures
PDB	Ortholog search: PDBe RCSB
PDB	List of PDB id codes 2VIF

Gene location (Human)
Chr.	Chromosome 18 (human)
Band	18q22.2	Start	70,289,045 bp
Band	18q22.2	End	70,330,199 bp

Gene location (Mouse)
Chr.	Chromosome 18 (mouse)
Band	18|18 E4	Start	88,683,348 bp
Band	18|18 E4	End	88,945,605 bp
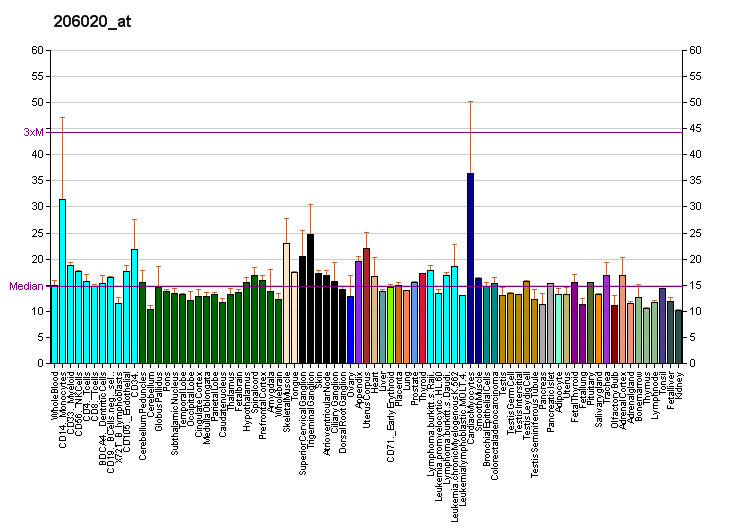

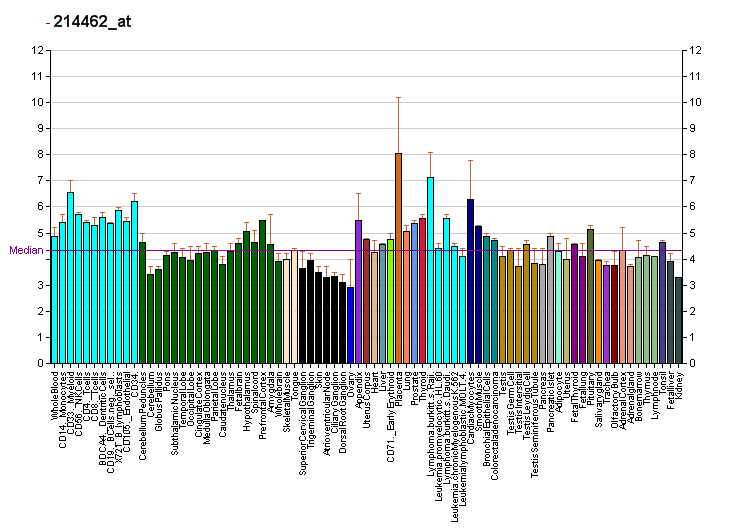
RNA expression pattern
Bgee	Human / Mouse (ortholog); Top expressed in: mucosa of paranasal sinus; biceps brachii; Skeletal muscle tissue of rectus abdominis; jejunal mucosa; oral cavity; mucosa of colon; mucosa of sigmoid colon; Skeletal muscle tissue of biceps brachii; right ventricle; caput epididymis / Top expressed in: otic vesicle; otic placode; zygote; saccule; secondary oocyte; pineal gland; yolk sac; intercostal muscle; soleus muscle; medial geniculate nucleus; More reference expression data
BioGPS	More reference expression data
Gene ontology
Molecular function	protein kinase inhibitor activity; protein binding; 1-phosphatidylinositol-3-kinase regulator activity
Cellular component	cytoplasm; immunological synapse; cytosol; phosphatidylinositol 3-kinase complex
Biological process	regulation of growth; defense response; proteasomal protein catabolic process; receptor signaling pathway via JAK-STAT; negative regulation of signal transduction; intracellular signal transduction; negative regulation of T cell activation; protein ubiquitination; negative regulation of protein kinase activity; cytokine-mediated signaling pathway; negative regulation of receptor signaling pathway via JAK-STAT; post-translational protein modification; regulation of phosphatidylinositol 3-kinase activity; phosphatidylinositol phosphate biosynthetic process
Sources:Amigo / QuickGO
Orthologs
Databases	NCBI: entry; OMA: entry
Species	Human	Mouse
Entrez	9306	54607
Ensembl	ENSG00000170677	ENSMUSG00000056153
UniProt	O14544	Q9JLY0
RefSeq (mRNA)	NM_004232; NM_016387	NM_018821
RefSeq (protein)	NP_004223	NP_061291
Location (UCSC)	Chr 18: 70.29 – 70.33 Mb	Chr 18: 88.68 – 88.95 Mb
PubMed search
- Wikidata
View/Edit Human	View/Edit Mouse

Suppressor of cytokine signaling 6 is a protein that in humans is encoded by the SOCS6 gene.

The protein encoded by this gene contains a SH2 domain and a CIS homolog domain. The protein thus belongs to the cytokine-induced STAT inhibitor (CIS), also known as suppressor of cytokine signaling (SOCS) or STAT-induced STAT inhibitor (SSI) protein family. CIS family members are known to be cytokine-inducible negative regulators of cytokine signaling. The expression of this gene can be induced by GM-CSF and EPO in hematopoietic cells. A high expression level of this gene was found in factor-independent chronic myelogenous leukemia (CML) and erythroleukemia (HEL) cell lines.
