= SH2B1 =

Protein-coding gene in the species Homo sapiens

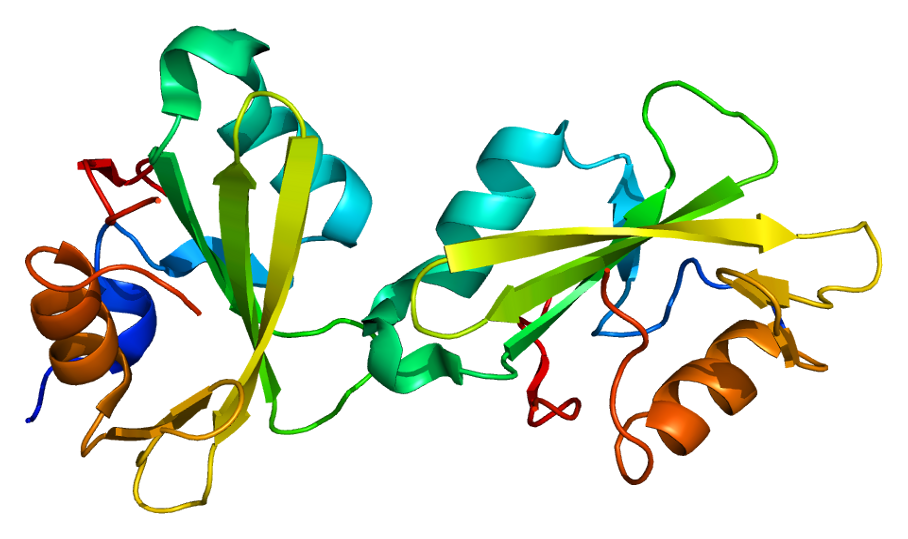

Identifiers
- Aliases: SH2B1, PSM, SH2B, SH2B adaptor protein 1
- External IDs: OMIM: 608937; MGI: 1201407; GeneCards: SH2B1
Available structures
PDB	Ortholog search: PDBe RCSB
PDB	List of PDB id codes 2HDV, 2HDX

Gene location (Human)
Chr.	Chromosome 16 (human)
Band	16p11.2	Start	28,846,600 bp
Band	16p11.2	End	28,874,212 bp

Gene location (Mouse)
Chr.	Chromosome 7 (mouse)
Band	7 F3|7 69.06 cM	Start	126,066,166 bp
Band	7 F3|7 69.06 cM	End	126,074,596 bp
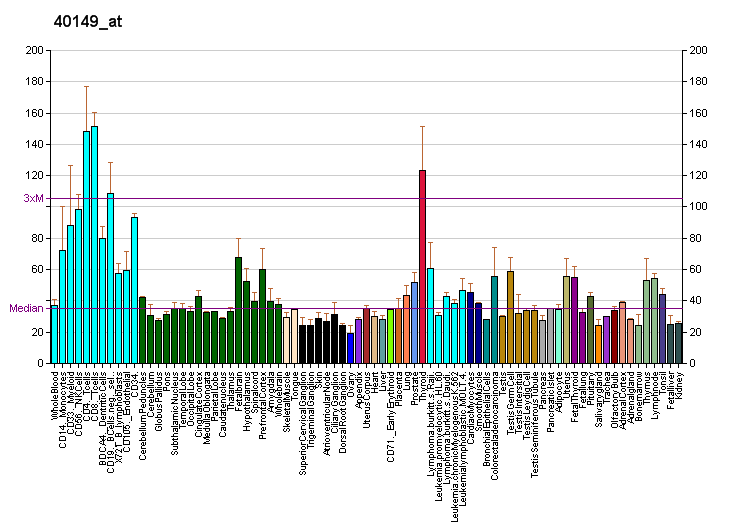

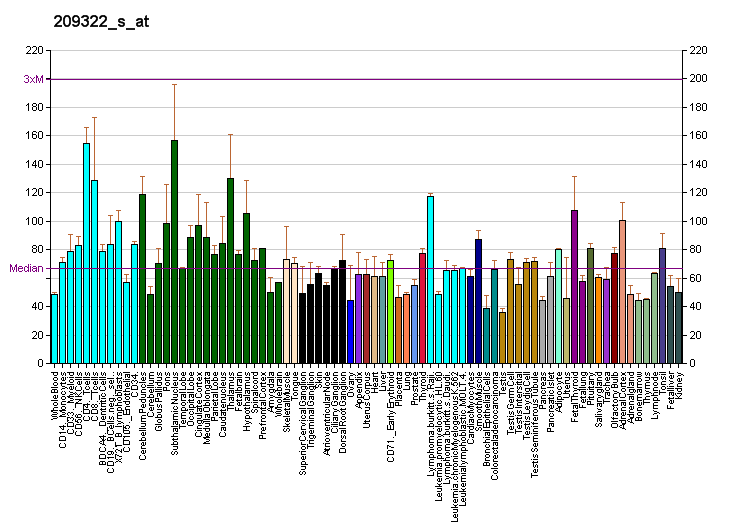
RNA expression pattern
Bgee	Human / Mouse (ortholog); Top expressed in: right hemisphere of cerebellum; mucosa of transverse colon; right lobe of thyroid gland; right uterine tube; apex of heart; left lobe of thyroid gland; anterior pituitary; right ovary; left ovary; right frontal lobe / Top expressed in: neural layer of retina; granulocyte; muscle of thigh; molar; lip; superior frontal gyrus; primary visual cortex; thymus; ankle; quadriceps femoris muscle; More reference expression data
BioGPS	More reference expression data
Gene ontology
Molecular function	signaling adaptor activity; protein binding; transmembrane receptor protein tyrosine kinase adaptor activity
Cellular component	cytosol; nucleus; membrane; cytoplasm; plasma membrane
Biological process	positive regulation of signal transduction; positive regulation of mitotic nuclear division; blood coagulation; lamellipodium assembly; signal transduction; regulation of DNA biosynthetic process; transmembrane receptor protein tyrosine kinase signaling pathway; intracellular signal transduction
Sources:Amigo / QuickGO
Orthologs
Databases	NCBI: entry; OMA: entry
Species	Human	Mouse
Entrez	25970	20399
Ensembl	ENSG00000178188	ENSMUSG00000030733
UniProt	Q9NRF2	Q91ZM2
RefSeq (mRNA)	NM_001145795; NM_001145796; NM_001145797; NM_001145812; NM_001308293 NM_001308294; NM_015503; NM_001387404; NM_001387430	NM_001081459; NM_001289538; NM_001289539; NM_001289540; NM_001289541 NM_001289542; NM_011363
RefSeq (protein)	NP_001139267; NP_001139268; NP_001139269; NP_001139284; NP_001295222 NP_001295223; NP_056318	NP_001074928; NP_001276467; NP_001276468; NP_001276469; NP_001276470 NP_001276471; NP_035493
Location (UCSC)	Chr 16: 28.85 – 28.87 Mb	Chr 7: 126.07 – 126.07 Mb
PubMed search
- Wikidata
View/Edit Human	View/Edit Mouse

SH2B adapter protein 1 is a protein that in humans is encoded by the SH2B1 gene.

== Interactions ==
SH2B1 has been shown to interact with:

- Grb2,
- Insulin receptor,
- Janus kinase 2, and
- TrkA.

== Clinical significance ==
Variations close to or in the SH2B1 gene have been found to associate with obesity in two very large genome wide association studies of body mass index (BMI). Furthermore, SH2B1 deletions are associated with severe early-onset obesity.

== See also ==
- Genetics of obesity
