= BCAR3 =

Protein-coding gene in humans

Identifiers
- Aliases: BCAR3, NSP2, SH2D3B, breast cancer anti-estrogen resistance 3, AND-34, NSP family adaptor protein, BCAR3 adaptor protein, NSP family member, MIG7
- External IDs: OMIM: 604704; MGI: 1352501; GeneCards: BCAR3
Available structures
PDB	Ortholog search: PDBe RCSB
PDB	List of PDB id codes 3T6A

Gene location (Human)
Chr.	Chromosome 1 (human)
Band	1p22.1	Start	93,561,741 bp
Band	1p22.1	End	93,847,150 bp

Gene location (Mouse)
Chr.	Chromosome 3 (mouse)
Band	3|3 G1	Start	122,087,785 bp
Band	3|3 G1	End	122,323,840 bp
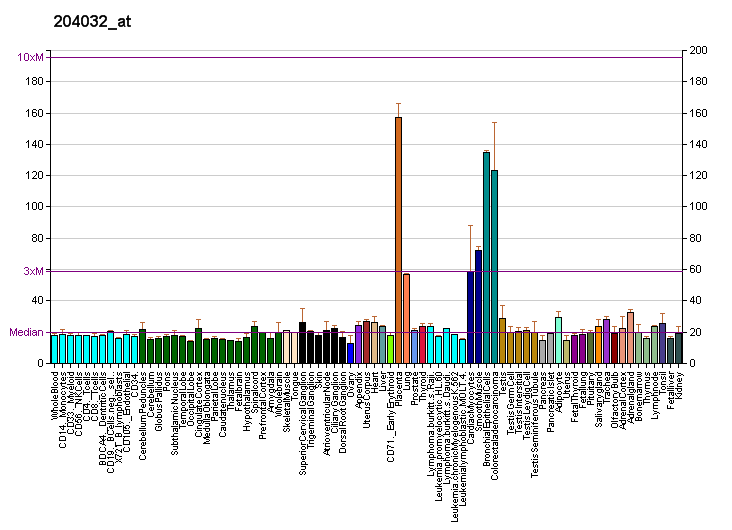
RNA expression pattern
Bgee	Human / Mouse (ortholog); Top expressed in: parotid gland; right lung; rectum; placenta; mucosa of transverse colon; Skeletal muscle tissue of biceps brachii; gastrocnemius muscle; sural nerve; germinal epithelium; subcutaneous adipose tissue / Top expressed in: primary oocyte; zygote; secondary oocyte; molar; jejunum; subcutaneous adipose tissue; submandibular gland; left lobe of liver; retinal pigment epithelium; intestinal villus; More reference expression data
BioGPS	More reference expression data
Gene ontology
Molecular function	protein binding; guanyl-nucleotide exchange factor activity
Cellular component	intracellular anatomical structure
Biological process	small GTPase mediated signal transduction; lens morphogenesis in camera-type eye; signal transduction; positive regulation of peptidyl-serine phosphorylation; positive regulation of signal transduction
Sources:Amigo / QuickGO
Orthologs
Databases	NCBI: entry; OMA: entry
Species	Human	Mouse
Entrez	8412	29815
Ensembl	ENSG00000137936	ENSMUSG00000028121
UniProt	O75815	Q9QZK2
RefSeq (mRNA)	NM_001261408; NM_001261409; NM_001261410; NM_001308251; NM_003567	NM_013867; NM_001355264
RefSeq (protein)	NP_001248337; NP_001248338; NP_001248339; NP_001295180; NP_003558	NP_038895; NP_001342193
Location (UCSC)	Chr 1: 93.56 – 93.85 Mb	Chr 3: 122.09 – 122.32 Mb
PubMed search
- Wikidata
View/Edit Human	View/Edit Mouse

Breast cancer anti-estrogen resistance protein 3 is a protein that in humans is encoded by the BCAR3 gene.

== Function ==
Breast tumors are initially dependent on estrogens for growth and progression and can be inhibited by anti-estrogens such as tamoxifen. However, breast cancers progress to become anti-estrogen resistant. Breast cancer anti-estrogen resistance gene 3 was identified in the search for genes involved in the development of estrogen resistance. The gene encodes a component of intracellular signal transduction that causes estrogen-independent proliferation in human breast cancer cells. The protein contains a putative src homology 2 (SH2) domain, a hallmark of cellular tyrosine kinase signaling molecules, and is partly homologous to the cell division cycle protein CDC48.
