= Tyrosine-protein kinase Fes/Fps =

Human protein and coding gene

FES
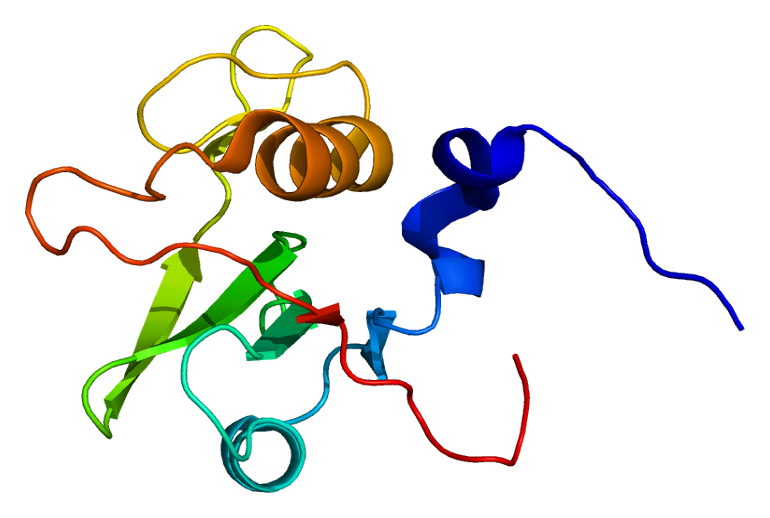

Identifiers
- Aliases: FES, FPS, Feline sarcoma oncogene, FES proto-oncogene, tyrosine kinase
- External IDs: OMIM: 190030; MGI: 95514; GeneCards: FES
Available structures
PDB	Ortholog search: PDBe RCSB
PDB	List of PDB id codes 1WQU, 2DCR, 3BKB, 3CBL, 3CD3, 4DYL, 4E93
Enzyme activity
EC #	BRENDA	ExPASy	KEGG	MetaCyc
2.7.10.2	↗	↗	↗	↗

Gene location (Human)
Chr.	Chromosome 15 (human)
Band	15q26.1	Start	90,883,695 bp
Band	15q26.1	End	90,895,776 bp

Gene location (Mouse)
Chr.	Chromosome 7 (mouse)
Band	7 D2|7 45.65 cM	Start	80,027,504 bp
Band	7 D2|7 45.65 cM	End	80,037,694 bp
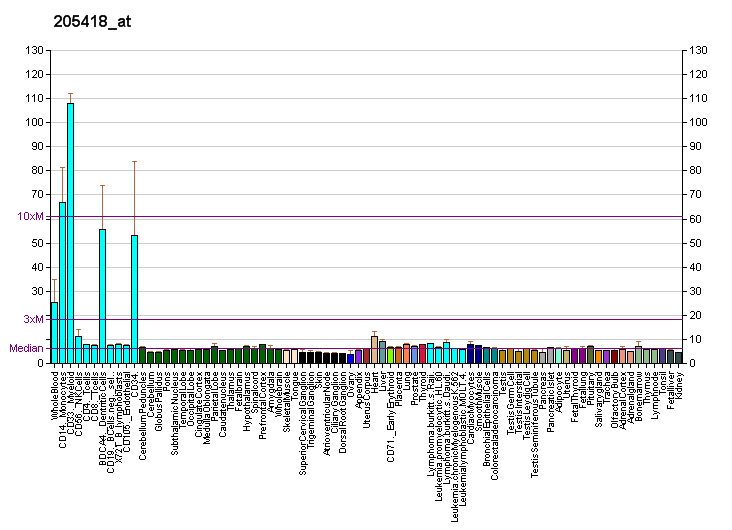
RNA expression pattern
Bgee	Human / Mouse (ortholog); Top expressed in: monocyte; spleen; granulocyte; right lung; upper lobe of left lung; blood; sural nerve; apex of heart; right lobe of liver; left uterine tube / Top expressed in: granulocyte; bone marrow; stroma of bone marrow; tibiofemoral joint; ankle joint; blood; spleen; mesenteric lymph nodes; internal carotid artery; body of femur; More reference expression data
BioGPS	More reference expression data
Gene ontology
Molecular function	transferase activity; nucleotide binding; protein kinase activity; microtubule binding; immunoglobulin receptor binding; non-membrane spanning protein tyrosine kinase activity; kinase activity; protein binding; phosphatidylinositol binding; ATP binding; lipid binding; protein tyrosine kinase activity
Cellular component	cytoplasm; cytosol; Golgi apparatus; membrane; focal adhesion; microtubule cytoskeleton; extrinsic component of cytoplasmic side of plasma membrane; plasma membrane; cell junction; cytoskeleton; cytoplasmic vesicle
Biological process	phosphorylation; regulation of vesicle-mediated transport; regulation of cell motility; multicellular organism development; chemotaxis; protein phosphorylation; regulation of cell adhesion; regulation of cell population proliferation; microtubule bundle formation; regulation of cell shape; positive regulation of neuron projection development; positive regulation of microtubule polymerization; peptidyl-tyrosine autophosphorylation; regulation of cell differentiation; protein autophosphorylation; peptidyl-tyrosine phosphorylation; regulation of mast cell degranulation; cell population proliferation; innate immune response; positive regulation of actin cytoskeleton reorganization; positive regulation of myeloid cell differentiation; epidermal growth factor receptor signaling pathway; cell migration; centrosome cycle; cell adhesion; positive regulation of monocyte differentiation; cellular response to vitamin D
Sources:Amigo / QuickGO
Orthologs
Databases	NCBI: entry; OMA: entry
Species	Human	Mouse
Entrez	2242	14159
Ensembl	ENSG00000182511	ENSMUSG00000053158
UniProt	P07332	P16879
RefSeq (mRNA)	NM_001143783; NM_001143784; NM_001143785; NM_002005	NM_010194
RefSeq (protein)	NP_001137255; NP_001137256; NP_001137257; NP_001996	NP_034324
Location (UCSC)	Chr 15: 90.88 – 90.9 Mb	Chr 7: 80.03 – 80.04 Mb
PubMed search
- Wikidata
View/Edit Human	View/Edit Mouse

Tyrosine-protein kinase Fes/Fps also known as proto-oncogene c-Fes/Fps is an enzyme that in humans is encoded by the FES gene. FES was originally cloned as a retroviral oncogene from feline (v-FES) and avian (v-FPS) sarcomas. This triggered the subsequent identification and cloning of the cellular FES (c-FES) genes (also referred to as FPS) in birds and mammals.

== Function ==
This gene encodes the human cellular counterpart of a feline sarcoma retrovirus protein with transforming capabilities. The gene product has tyrosine-specific protein kinase activity and that activity is required for maintenance of cellular transformation. Its chromosomal location has linked it to a specific translocation event identified in patients with acute promyelocytic leukemia but it is also involved in normal hematopoiesis. A truncated transcript has been identified that is generated utilizing a start site in one of the far downstream exons but a protein product associated with this transcript has not been identified.

== Interactions ==
Feline sarcoma oncogene has been shown to interact with BCAR1 and BCR gene.
