= SH2D3A =

Protein-coding gene in the species Homo sapiens

Identifiers
- Aliases: SH2D3A, NSP1, SH2 domain containing 3A
- External IDs: OMIM: 604721; GeneCards: SH2D3A

Gene location (Human)
Chr.	Chromosome 19 (human)
Band	19p13.3	Start	6,752,160 bp
Band	19p13.3	End	6,767,463 bp
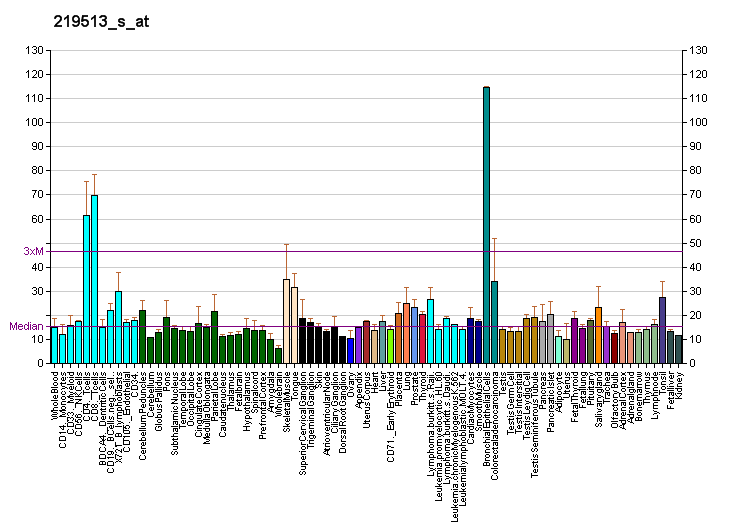
RNA expression pattern
Bgee	Human / Mouse (ortholog); Top expressed in: buccal mucosa cell; olfactory bulb; mucosa of transverse colon; skin of abdomen; skin of leg; granulocyte; olfactory zone of nasal mucosa; minor salivary glands; body of pancreas; tendon of biceps brachii / n/a; More reference expression data
BioGPS	More reference expression data
Gene ontology
Molecular function	protein binding; guanyl-nucleotide exchange factor activity
Cellular component	intracellular anatomical structure
Biological process	small GTPase mediated signal transduction; JNK cascade; positive regulation of signal transduction; positive regulation of peptidyl-serine phosphorylation
Sources:Amigo / QuickGO
Orthologs
Databases	NCBI: entry; OMA: entry
Species	Human	Mouse
Entrez	10045	n/a
Ensembl	ENSG00000125731	n/a
UniProt	Q9BRG2	n/a
RefSeq (mRNA)	NM_005490	n/a
RefSeq (protein)	NP_005481	n/a
Location (UCSC)	Chr 19: 6.75 – 6.77 Mb	n/a
PubMed search		n/a
- Wikidata
View/Edit Human

SH2 domain-containing protein 3A is a protein that in humans is encoded by the SH2D3A gene. The protein may be useful in Western Blots and ELISAs.

== Interactions ==
SH2D3A has been shown to interact with the epidermal growth factor receptor. The gene may play a role in JNK activation.
