= SH2B2 =

Protein-coding gene in the species Homo sapiens

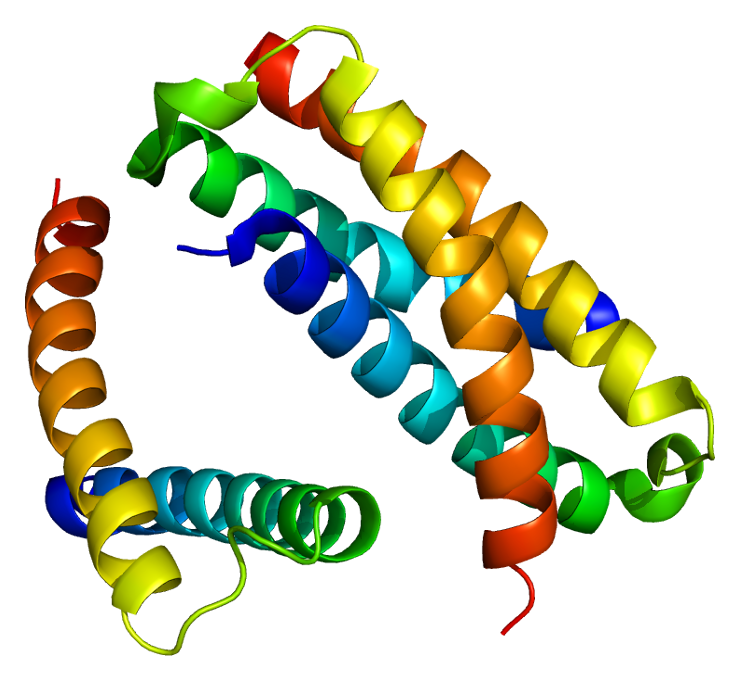

Identifiers
- Aliases: SH2B2, APS, SH2B adaptor protein 2
- External IDs: OMIM: 605300; MGI: 1345171; GeneCards: SH2B2
Available structures
PDB	Ortholog search: PDBe RCSB
PDB	List of PDB id codes 1Q2H

Gene location (Human)
Chr.	Chromosome 7 (human)
Band	7q22.1	Start	102,285,091 bp
Band	7q22.1	End	102,321,711 bp

Gene location (Mouse)
Chr.	Chromosome 5 (mouse)
Band	5|5 G2	Start	136,247,001 bp
Band	5|5 G2	End	136,275,410 bp
RNA expression pattern
Bgee	Human / Mouse (ortholog); Top expressed in: triceps brachii muscle; Skeletal muscle tissue of biceps brachii; muscle of thigh; vastus lateralis muscle; renal medulla; muscle of trunk; Skeletal muscle tissue of rectus abdominis; thoracic diaphragm; tibialis anterior muscle; body of tongue / Top expressed in: brown adipose tissue; granulocyte; white adipose tissue; tunica adventitia of aorta; spermatocyte; ganglionic eminence; internal carotid artery; gastrula; tail of embryo; placenta; More reference expression data
BioGPS	n/a
Gene ontology
Molecular function	JAK pathway signal transduction adaptor activity; protein binding; signaling adaptor activity; transmembrane receptor protein tyrosine kinase adaptor activity; identical protein binding
Cellular component	cytoplasm; cytosol; plasma membrane; membrane; stress fiber; ruffle; actin filament
Biological process	insulin receptor signaling pathway; blood coagulation; signal transduction; regulation of receptor signaling pathway via JAK-STAT; positive regulation of signal transduction; intracellular signal transduction; B-1 B cell homeostasis; nervous system development; cytokine-mediated signaling pathway; regulation of metabolic process; actin cytoskeleton organization; regulation of Ras protein signal transduction; regulation of immune response; antigen receptor-mediated signaling pathway; brown fat cell differentiation
Sources:Amigo / QuickGO
Orthologs
Databases	NCBI: entry; OMA: entry
Species	Human	Mouse
Entrez	10603	23921
Ensembl	ENSG00000160999	ENSMUSG00000005057
UniProt	O14492	Q9JID9
RefSeq (mRNA)	NM_020979; NM_001359228; NM_001359229; NM_001359230; NM_001359231	NM_018825; NM_001302938; NM_001302939
RefSeq (protein)	NP_066189; NP_001346157; NP_001346158; NP_001346159; NP_001346160	NP_001289867; NP_001289868; NP_061295
Location (UCSC)	Chr 7: 102.29 – 102.32 Mb	Chr 5: 136.25 – 136.28 Mb
PubMed search
- Wikidata
View/Edit Human	View/Edit Mouse

SH2B adapter protein 2 is a protein that in humans is encoded by the SH2B2 gene.

== Function ==
The protein encoded by this gene is expressed in B lymphocytes and contains pleckstrin homology and src homology 2 (SH2) domains. In Burkitt lymphoma cell lines, it is tyrosine phosphorylated in response to B cell receptor stimulation. Because it binds Shc independent of stimulation and Grb2 after stimulation, it appears to play a role in signal transduction from the receptor to Shc/Grb2.

== Interactions ==
SH2B2 has been shown to interact with TrkA and Cbl gene.
