= Tyrosine kinase =

Enzyme

Protein tyrosine kinase
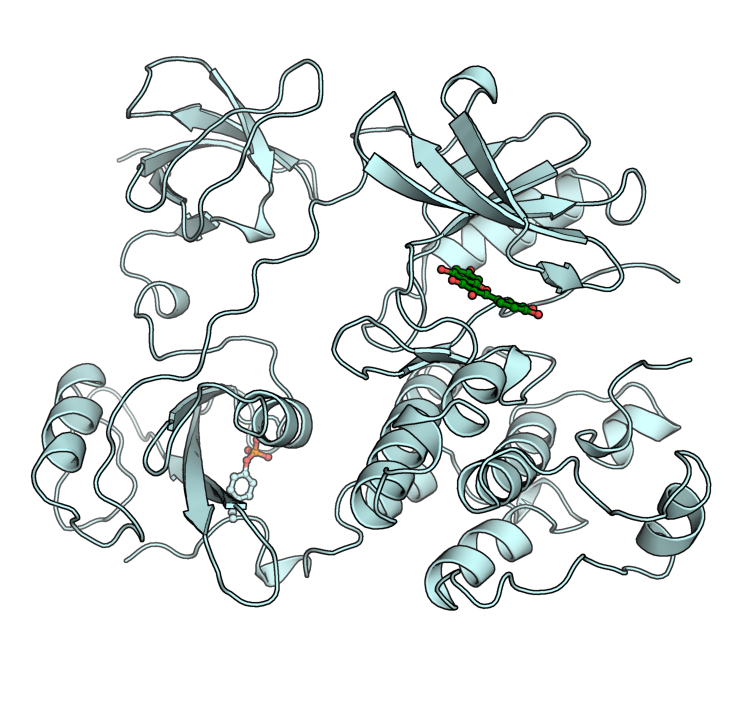
- pdb 2HCK, rendered in PyMOL

Identifiers
- Symbol: Pkinase_Tyr
- Pfam: PF07714
- InterPro: IPR001245
- SMART: TyrKc
- PROSITE: PDOC00629
- SCOP2: 1apm / SCOPe / SUPFAM
- OPM superfamily: 186
- OPM protein: 2k1k
- CDD: cd00192
- Membranome: 3
Available protein structures:
- PDB: IPR001245 PF07714 (ECOD; PDBsum)
- AlphaFold: IPR001245; PF07714

A tyrosine kinase is an enzyme that can transfer a phosphate group from ATP to the tyrosine residues of specific proteins inside a cell. It functions as an "on" or "off" switch in many cellular functions.

Tyrosine kinases belong to a larger class of enzymes known as protein kinases which also attach phosphates to other amino acids such as serine and threonine. Phosphorylation of proteins by kinases is an important mechanism for communicating signals within a cell (signal transduction) and regulating cellular activity, such as cell division.

Protein kinases can become mutated, stuck in the "on" position, and cause unregulated growth of the cell, which is a necessary step for the development of cancer. Therefore, kinase inhibitors, such as imatinib and osimertinib, are often effective cancer treatments.

Most tyrosine kinases have an associated protein tyrosine phosphatase, which removes the phosphate group.

== Reaction ==
An enzyme that transfers a phosphate group from ATP (adenosine triphosphate) to a tyrosine amino acid on a protein.

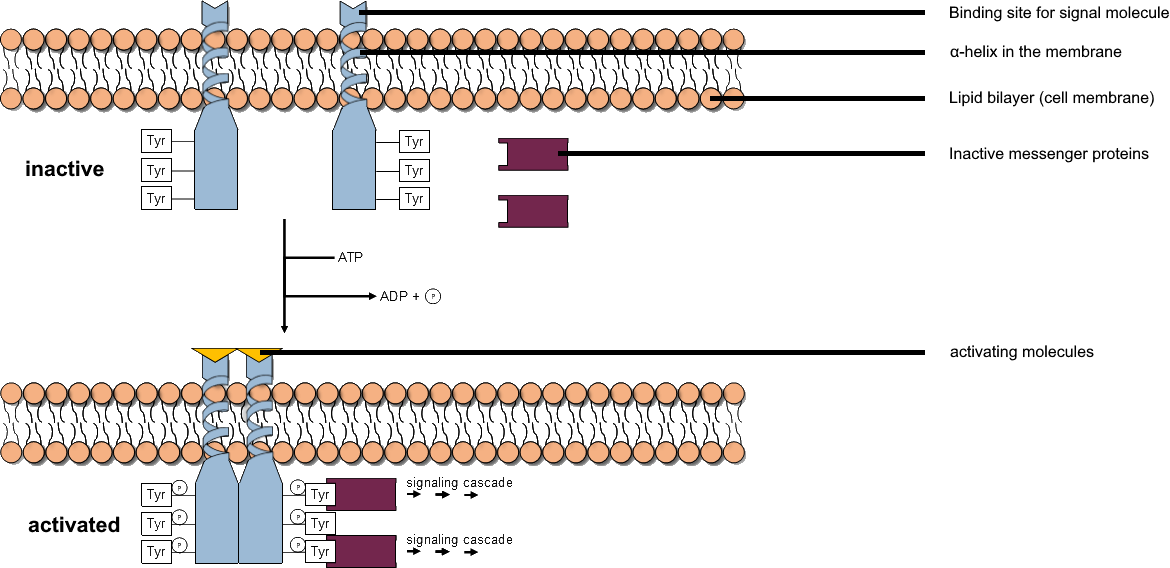
Diagram of the activation process.

Protein kinases are a group of enzymes that possess a catalytic subunit that transfers the gamma (terminal) phosphate from nucleoside triphosphates (often ATP) to one or more amino acid residues in a protein substrate side-chain, resulting in a conformational change affecting protein function. The enzymes fall into two broad classes, characterised with respect to substrate specificity: serine/threonine-specific, and tyrosine-specific (the subject of this article).

== Function ==
Kinase is a large family of enzymes that are responsible for catalyzing the transfer of a phosphoryl group from a nucleoside triphosphate donor, such as ATP, to an acceptor molecule. Tyrosine kinases catalyze the phosphorylation of tyrosine residues in proteins. The phosphorylation of tyrosine residues in turn causes a change in the function of the protein that they are contained in.

Phosphorylation at tyrosine residues controls a wide range of properties in proteins such as enzyme activity, subcellular localization, and interaction between molecules. Furthermore, tyrosine kinases function in many signal transduction cascades wherein extracellular signals are transmitted through the cell membrane to the cytoplasm and often to the nucleus, where gene expression may be modified. Finally mutations can cause some tyrosine kinases to become constitutively active, a nonstop functional state that may contribute to initiation or progression of cancer.

Tyrosine kinases function in a variety of processes, pathways, and actions, and are responsible for key events in the body. The receptor tyrosine kinases function in transmembrane signaling, whereas tyrosine kinases within the cell function in signal transduction to the nucleus. Tyrosine kinase activity in the nucleus involves cell-cycle control and properties of transcription factors. In this way, in fact, tyrosine kinase activity is involved in mitogenesis, or the induction of mitosis in a cell; proteins in the cytosol and proteins in the nucleus are phosphorylated at tyrosine residues during this process. Cellular growth and reproduction may rely to some degree on tyrosine kinase. Tyrosine kinase function has been observed in the nuclear matrix, which comprises not the chromatin but rather the nuclear envelope and a “fibrous web” that serves to physically stabilize DNA. To be specific, Lyn, a type of kinase in the Src family that was identified in the nuclear matrix, appears to control the cell cycle. Src family tyrosine kinases are closely related but demonstrate a wide variety of functionality. Roles or expressions of Src family tyrosine kinases vary significantly according to cell type, as well as during cell growth and differentiation. Lyn and Src family tyrosine kinases in general have been known to function in signal transduction pathways. There is evidence that Lyn is localized at the cell membrane; Lyn is associated both physically and functionally with a variety of receptor molecules.

Fibroblasts – a type of cell that synthesizes the extracellular matrix and collagen and is involved in wound healing – that have been transformed by the polyomavirus possess higher tyrosine activity in the cellular matrix. Furthermore, tyrosine kinase activity has been determined to be correlated to cellular transformation. It has also been demonstrated that phosphorylation of a middle-T antigen on tyrosine is also associated with cell transformation, a change that is similar to cellular growth or reproduction.

The transmission of mechanical force and regulatory signals are quite fundamental in the normal survival of a living organism. Protein tyrosine kinase plays a role in this task, too. A protein tyrosine kinase called pp125, also referred to as focal adhesion kinase (FAK) is likely at hand in the influence of cellular focal adhesions, as indicated by an immunofluorescent localization of FAK. Focal adhesions are macromolecular structures that function in the transmission of mechanical force and regulatory signals.

Cellular proliferation, as explained in some detail above, may rely in some part on tyrosine kinase. Tyrosine kinase function has been observed in the nuclear matrix. Lyn, the type of kinase that was the first to be discovered in the nuclear matrix, is part of Src family of tyrosine kinases, which can be contained in the nucleus of differentiating, calcium-provoked kertinocytes. Lyn, in the nuclear matrix, among the nuclear envelope and the “fibrous web” that physically stabilizes DNA, was found functioning in association with the matrix. Also, it appeared to be conditional to cell cycle. The contribution of the Lyn protein to the total tyrosine kinase activity within the nuclear matrix is unknown, however; because the Lyn was extracted only partially, an accurate measurement of its activity could not be managed. Indications, as such, are that, according to Vegesna et al. (1996), Lyn polypeptides are associated with tyrosine kinase activity in the nuclear matrix. The extracted Lyn was enzymatically active, offering support for this notion.

Yet another possible and probable role of protein tyrosine kinase is that in the event of circulatory failure and organ dysfunction caused by endotoxin in rats, where the effects of inhibitors tyrphostin and genistein are involved with protein tyrosine kinase. Signals in the surroundings received by receptors in the membranes of cells are transmitted into the cell cytoplasm. Transmembrane signaling due to receptor tyrosine kinases, according to Bae et al. (2009), relies heavily on interactions, for example, mediated by the SH2 protein domain; it has been determined via experimentation that the SH2 protein domain selectivity is functional in mediating cellular processes involving tyrosine kinase. Receptor tyrosine kinases may, by this method, influence growth factor receptor signaling. This is one of the more fundamental cellular communication functions metazoans.

== Regulation ==
Major changes are sometimes induced when the tyrosine kinase enzyme is affected by other factors. One of the factors is a molecule that is bound reversibly by a protein, called a ligand. A number of receptor tyrosine kinases, though certainly not all, do not perform protein-kinase activity until they are occupied, or activated, by one of these ligands. Although more research indicates that receptors remain active within endosomes, it was once thought that endocytosis caused by ligands was the event responsible for the process in which receptors are inactivated. Activated receptor tyrosine kinase receptors are internalized (recycled back into the system) in short time and are ultimately delivered to lysosomes, where they become work-adjacent to the catabolic acid hydrolases that partake in digestion. Internalized signaling complexes are involved in different roles in different receptor tyrosine kinase systems, the specifics of which were researched. In addition, ligands participate in reversible binding, with inhibitors binding non-covalently (inhibition of different types are effected depending on whether these inhibitors bind the enzyme, the enzyme-substrate complex, or both). Multivalency, which is an attribute that bears particular interest to some people involved in related scientific research, is a phenomenon characterized by the concurrent binding of several ligands positioned on one unit to several coinciding receptors on another. In any case, the binding of the ligand to its partner is apparent owing to the effects that it can have on the functionality of many proteins. Ligand-activated receptor tyrosine kinases, as they are sometimes referred to, demonstrate a unique attribute. Once a tyrosine receptor kinase is bonded to its ligand, it is able to bind to tyrosine kinase residing in the cytosol of the cell.

=== Erythrocytes ===
An example of this trigger-system in action is the process by which the formation of erythrocytes is regulated. Mammals possess this system, which begins in the kidneys where the developmental signal is manufactured. The developmental signal, also called a cytokine, is erythropoietin in this case. (Cytokines are key regulators of hematopoietic cell proliferation and differentiation.) Erythropoietin's activity is initiated when hematopoietic cytokine receptors become activated. In erythrocyte regulation, erythropoietin is a protein containing 165 amino acids that plays a role in activating the cytoplasmic protein kinase JAK. The results of some newer research have also indicated that the aforementioned cytokine receptors function with members of the JAK tyrosine kinase family. The cytokine receptors activate the JAK kinases. This then results in the phosphorylation of several signaling proteins located in the cell membrane. This subsequently affects both the stimulation of ligand-mediated receptors and intracellular signaling pathway activation. Substrates for JAK kinases mediate some gene responses and more. The process is also responsible for mediating the production of blood cells. In this case, erythropoietin binds to the corresponding plasma membrane receptor, dimerizing the receptor. The dimer is responsible for activating the kinase JAK via binding. Tyrosine residues located in the cytoplasmic domain of the erythropoietin receptor are consequently phosphorylated by the activated protein kinase JAK. Overall, this is also how a receptor tyrosine kinase might be activated by a ligand to regulate erythrocyte formation.

=== Other examples ===
Additional instances of factor-influenced protein tyrosine kinase activity, similar to this one, exist. An adapter protein such as Grb2 will bind to phosphate-tyrosine residues under the influence of receptor protein kinases. This mechanism is an ordinary one that provokes protein-protein interactions.

Furthermore, to illustrate an extra circumstance, insulin-associated factors have been determined to influence tyrosine kinase. Insulin receptor substrates are molecules that function in signaling by regulating the effects of insulin. Many receptor enzymes have closely related structure and receptor tyrosine kinase activity, and it has been determined that the foundational or prototypical receptor enzyme is insulin. Insulin receptor substrates IRS2 and IRS3 each have unique characteristic tissue function and distribution that serves to enhance signaling capabilities in pathways that are initiated by receptor tyrosine kinases. Activated IRS-1 molecules enhance the signal created by insulin. The insulin receptor system, in contrast, appears to diminish the efficacy of endosomal signaling.

The epidermal growth factor receptor system, as such, has been used as an intermediate example. Some signals are produced from the actual cell surface in this case but other signals seem to emanate from within the endosomes. This variety of function may be a means to create ligand-specific signals. This supports the notion that trafficking, a term for the modification of proteins subsequent to mRNA translation, may be vital to the function of receptor signaling.

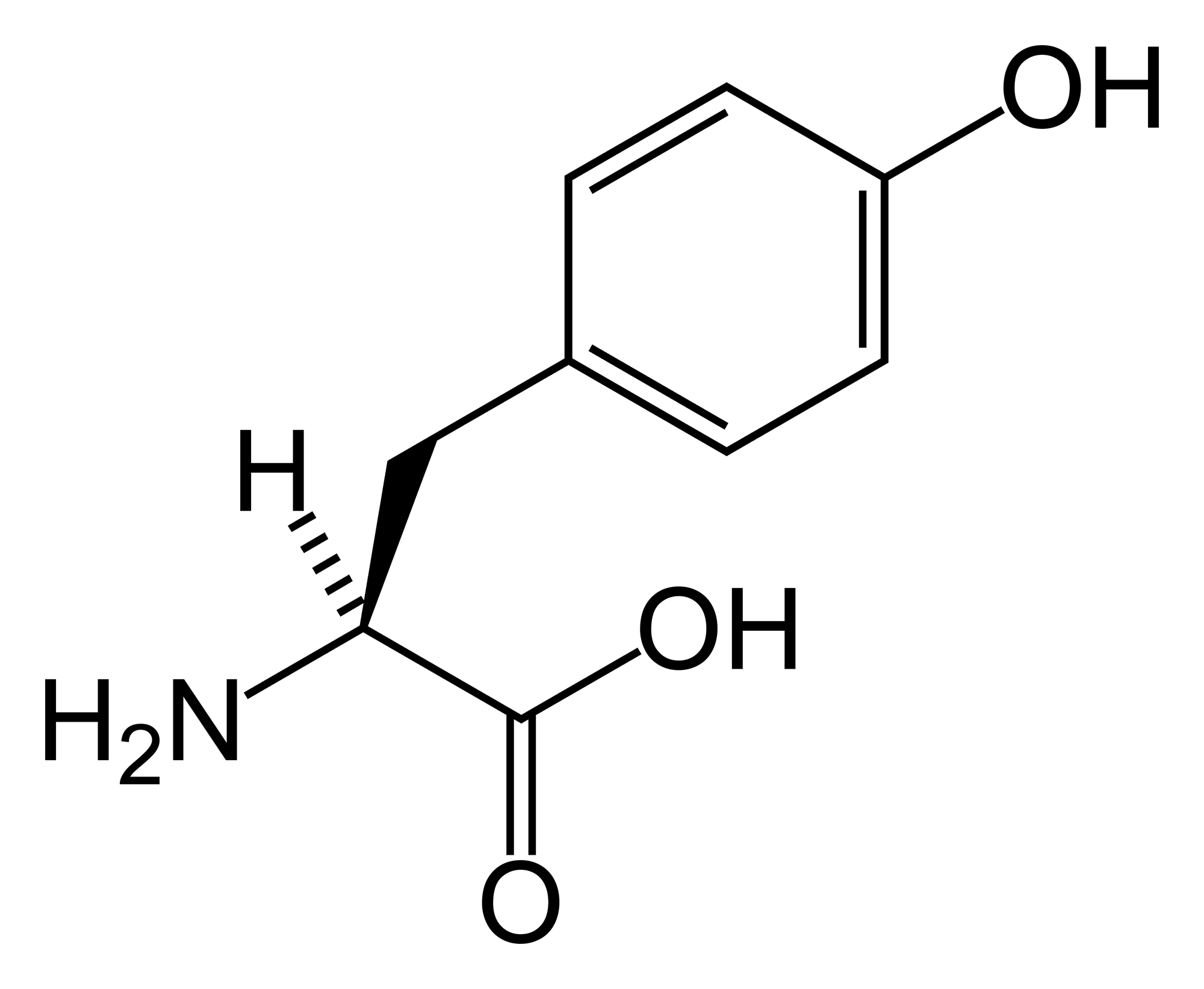
Tyrosine

Phosphate

ATP

== Structure ==
Protein tyrosine kinase proteins contain a Protein kinase domain, which consists of an N-terminal lobe comprising 5 beta sheet strands and an alpha helix called the C-helix, and a C-terminal domain usually comprising 6 alpha helices (helices D, E, F, G, H, and I). Two loops in the center of the kinase domain control catalysis. The catalytic loop contains the HRD motif (usually with sequence His-Arg-Asp). The aspartic acid of this motif forms a hydrogen bond with the substrate OH group on Tyr during catalysis. The other loop is the activation loop, whose position and conformation determine in part whether the kinase is active or inactive. The activation loop begins with the DFG motif (usually with sequence Asp-Phe-Gly).

There are over 1800 3D structures of tyrosine kinases available in the Protein Data Bank. An example is PDB: 1IRK, the crystal structure of the tyrosine kinase domain of the human insulin receptor.

== Families ==
There are 90 human genes that contain a total of 94 protein tyrosine kinase domains (PTKs). Four genes contain both a catalytically active kinase domain and a pseudokinase domain (a kinase domain with no catalytic activity: JAK1, JAK2, JAK3, and TYK2). Including these four genes, there are 82 human genes that contain a catalytically active tyrosine kinase domain They are divided into two classes, receptor and non-receptor tyrosine kinases.

=== Receptor ===
By 2004, 58 human receptor tyrosine kinases (RTKs) were known, grouped into 20 subfamilies. Eight of these membrane proteins which contain tyrosine protein kinase domains are actually pseudokinases, without catalytic activity (EPHA10, EPHB6, ERBB3, PTK7, ROR1, ROR2, RYK, and STYK1). Receptor tyrosine kinases play pivotal roles in diverse cellular activities including growth (by signaling neurotrophins), differentiation, metabolism, adhesion, motility, and death. RTKs are composed of an extracellular domain, which is able to bind a specific ligand, a transmembrane domain, and an intracellular catalytic domain, which is able to bind and phosphorylate selected substrates. Binding of a ligand to the extracellular region causes a series of structural rearrangements in the RTK that lead to its enzymatic activation. In particular, movement of some parts of the kinase domain gives free access to adenosine triphosphate (ATP) and the substrate to the active site. This triggers a cascade of events through phosphorylation of intracellular proteins that ultimately transmit ("transduce") the extracellular signal to the nucleus, causing changes in gene expression. Many RTKs are involved in oncogenesis, either by gene mutation, or chromosome translocation, or simply by over-expression. In every case, the result is a hyper-active kinase, that confers an aberrant, ligand-independent, non-regulated growth stimulus to the cancer cells.

=== Cytoplasmic/non-receptor ===
In humans, there are 32 cytoplasmic protein tyrosine kinases (EC 2.7.10.2).

The first non-receptor tyrosine kinase identified was the v-src oncogenic protein. Most animal cells contain one or more members of the Src family of tyrosine kinases. A chicken sarcoma virus, the Rous sarcoma virus mentioned above, was found to carry mutated versions of the normal cellular Src gene. The mutated v-src gene has lost the normal built-in inhibition of enzyme activity that is characteristic of cellular SRC (c-src) genes. SRC family members have been found to regulate many cellular processes. For example, the T-cell antigen receptor leads to intracellular signalling by activation of Lck and Fyn, two proteins that are structurally similar to Src.

== Clinical significance ==
Tyrosine kinases are particularly important today because of their implications in the treatment of cancer. A mutation that causes certain tyrosine kinases to be constitutively active has been associated with several cancers. Imatinib (brand names Gleevec and Glivec) is a drug able to bind the catalytic cleft of these tyrosine kinases, inhibiting its activity.

Tyrosine kinase activity is also significantly involved in other events that are sometimes considered highly unfavorable. For instance, enhanced activity of the enzyme has been implicated in the derangement of the function of certain systems, such as cell division. Also included are numerous diseases related to local inflammation such as atherosclerosis and psoriasis, or systemic inflammation such as sepsis and septic shock. A number of viruses target tyrosine kinase function during infection. The polyoma virus affects tyrosine kinase activity inside the nuclear matrix. Fibroblasts are cells involved in wound healing and cell structure formation in mammalian cells. When these cells are transformed by the polyoma virus, higher tyrosine activity is observed in the cellular matrix, which is also correlated to cellular proliferation. Another virus that targets tyrosine kinase is the Rous sarcoma virus, a retrovirus that causes sarcoma in chickens. Infected cells display obvious structure modifications and cell growth regulation that is extremely unusual. Protein tyrosine kinases that are encoded by the Rous sarcoma virus cause cellular transformation, and are termed oncoproteins. In addition, tyrosine kinase can sometimes function incorrectly in such a way that leads to non-small cell lung cancer. A common, widespread cancer, non-small cell lung cancer is the cause of death in more people than the total number in breast, colorectal, and prostate cancer together.

Research has shown that protein phosphorylation occurs on residues of tyrosine by both transmembrane receptor- and membrane-associated protein tyrosine kinases in normal cells. Phosphorylation plays a significant role in cellular signalling that regulates the number and variety of growth factors. This is evidenced by the observation that cells affected by the Rous sarcoma virus display obvious structural modifications and a total lack of normal cell growth regulation. Rous sarcoma virus-encoded oncoproteins are protein tyrosine kinases that are the cause of, and are required for, this cellular transformation. Tyrosine phosphorylation activity also increases or decreases in conjunction with changes in cell composition and growth regulation. In this way, a certain transformation exhibited by cells is dependent on a role that tyrosine kinase demonstrates. Protein tyrosine kinases, have a major role in the activation of lymphocytes. In addition, they are functional in mediating communication pathways in cell types such as adrenal chromaffin, platelets, and neural cells.

A tyrosine kinase can become an unregulated enzyme within an organism due to influences discussed, such as mutations and more. This behavior causes havoc; essential processes become disorganized. Systems on which the organism relies malfunction, resulting often in cancers. Preventing this type of circumstance is highly desirable. Much research has already noted the significant effect that inhibitors of the radically functioning protein tyrosine kinase enzymes have on related ailments. (See Tyrosine-kinase inhibitor )

=== Non-small cell lung cancer ===
Cancer's response to an inhibitor of tyrosine kinase was assessed in a clinical trial. In this case, Gefitinib is the inhibitor of tyrosine kinase. Incorrect tyrosine kinase function can lead to non-small cell lung cancer. Gefitinib is a tyrosine kinase inhibitor that targets the epidermal growth factor receptor, inducing favorable outcomes in patients with non-small cell lung cancers. A common, widespread cancer, non-small cell lung cancer is the cause of death in more people than breast, colorectal, and prostate cancer together. This is strong motivation to perform research on tyrosine kinase inhibitors as potential targets in cancer treatment. Gefitinib, functioning as an epidermal growth factor receptor tyrosine kinase inhibitor, improved symptoms related to non-small cell lung cancer and resulted in radiographic tumor regressions. This is an example of the efficacy of such an inhibitor. The process of inhibition shows how the cancer sustains. Mutations in the epidermal growth factor receptor activate signalling pathways that promote cell survival. Non-small cell lung cancer cells become dependent on these survival signals. Gefitinib's inhibition of the survival signals may be a contributing factor to its efficacy as a drug for non-small cell cancer treatment.

Gefitinib is well endured by humans, and treatment resulted in a symptom improvement rate of 43% (with 95% confidence in a 33%–53% interval) for patients that received 250 mg of Gefitinib and 35% (with 95% confidence in a 26%–45% interval) for those that received 500 mg. In the trial, epidermal growth factor receptor showed a rapid response to the inhibitor, as demonstrated by the improvement of the cancer symptoms. In each group, improvements were noted after a single week of epidermal growth factor receptor tyrosine kinase inhibitor treatment. Gefitinib application once per day caused “rapid” symptom improvement and tumor regressions in non-small cell lung cancer patients. In the field of medical research, this is an especially significant example of the use of an inhibitor to treat tyrosine kinase-associated cancer. Chemotherapy, surgery, and radiotherapy were the only major options available prior to the discoveries made in this trial. The side-effects of Gefitinib oral treatment once per day were considered significant. Diarrhea was reported in 57% of patients in the 250 mg group and in 75% of the 500 mg group. One patient had diarrhea more severe than Grade 2, with up to six bowel movements in only one day. Also, a death occurred possibly due to epidermal growth factor receptor tyrosine kinase inhibitor treatment; however, the correlation is not exactly clear. In addition, skin toxicity was observed in 62% of patients in the 250 mg group. Nevertheless, the side-effects of Gefitinib were only “generally mild, manageable, noncumulative, and reversible.” Unfortunately, ceasing to take the inhibitor may be the only reversal strategy of the unfavorable symptoms. Gefitinib still represents a reasonably safe and effective treatment compared to other cancer therapies.

Furthermore, epidermal growth factor receptor plays a crucial role in tumorigenesis, which is the production of a new tumor. By 2010 Two monoclonal antibodies and another small-molecule tyrosine kinase inhibitor called Erlotinib had also been developed to treat cancer.

July 12, 2013 FDA approved afatinib "multiple receptor, irreversible TKI" for the first-line treatment of patients with metastatic non-small cell lung cancer (NSCLC) whose tumors have epidermal growth factor receptor (EGFR) mutation

=== Chronic myeloid leukemia ===
BCR-ABL is a constitutively activated tyrosine kinase that is associated with chronic myeloid leukemia. It is formed from a fusion gene when pieces of chromosomes 9 and 22 break off and trade places. The ABL gene from chromosome 9 joins to the BCR gene on chromosome 22, to form the BCR-ABL fusion gene. Tyrosine kinase activity is crucial for the transformation of BCR-ABL. Therefore, inhibiting it improves cancer symptoms. Among currently available inhibitors to treat CML are imatinib, dasatinib, nilotinib, bosutinib and ponatinib.

=== Gastrointestinal stromal tumors ===
Gastrointestinal stromal tumors (GIST) are known to withstand cancer chemotherapy treatment and do not respond to any kind of therapy (in 2001) in advanced cases. However, tyrosine kinase inhibitor STI571 (imatinib) is effective in the treatment of patients with metastatic gastrointestinal stromal tumors. Gastrointestinal stromal tumors consist of a cluster of mesenchymal neoplasms that are formed from precursors to cells that make up the connective-tissue in the gastrointestinal tract. Most of these tumors are found in the stomach, though they can also be located in the small intestine or elsewhere in the intestinal tract. The cells of these tumors have a growth factor receptor associated with tyrosine kinase activity. This growth factor receptor is called c-kit and is produced by a proto-oncogene (c-kit). Mutation of c-kit causes the constitutive activity of tyrosine kinase, which results in cancerous gastrointestinal stromal tumors. Results of c-kit mutation include unrestricted tyrosine kinase activity and cell proliferation, unregulated phosphorylation of c-kit, and disruption of some communication pathways. Therapy with imatinib can inhibit the non-normal cell signaling mechanisms in gastrointestinal stromal tumors. This results in significant responses in patients and sustained disease control. By 2001 it was no longer doubted that this inhibitor can be effective and safe in humans. In similar manner, protein tyrosine kinase inhibitor STI571 was found to significantly reduce the physical size of tumors; they decreased roughly 65% in size in 4 months of trialing, and continued to diminish. New lesions did not appear, and a number of the liver metastases completely reduced to non-existence. The single patient in the study remained healthy following treatment. There are no effective means of treatment for advanced gastrointestinal stromal tumors, but that STI571 represents an effective treatment in early stage cancer associated with constitutively active c-kit, by inhibiting unfavourable tyrosine kinase activity.

== Inhibitors ==
To reduce enzyme activity, inhibitor molecules bind to enzymes. Reducing enzyme activity can disable a pathogen or correct an incorrectly function system; as such, many enzyme inhibitors are developed to be used as drugs by the general public.

=== GIST and Imatinib ===
Gastrointestinal stromal tumors (GIST) are mesenchymal tumors that affect the gastrointestinal tract. Treatment options have been limited. However Imatinib, as an inhibitor to the malfunctioning enzyme, can be effective.

=== Chronic myelogenous leukemia and nilotinib ===
If imatinib does not work, patients with advanced chronic myelogenous leukemia can use nilotinib, dasatinib, bosutinib, ponatinib, or another inhibitor to the malfunction enzyme that causes the leukemia. This inhibitor is a highly selective Bcr-Abl tyrosine kinase inhibitor.

=== Others ===
Sunitinib is an oral tyrosine kinase inhibitor that acts upon vascular endothelial growth factor receptor (VEGFR), platelet-derived growth factor receptor (PDGFR), stem cell factor receptor, and colony-stimulating factor-1 receptor (Burstein et al. 2008)

Gefitinib and erlotinib inhibit the tyrosine kinase domain of epidermal growth factor receptor (EGFR), and can be used to treat lung and pancreatic cancer where there is often over-expression of this cell-surface receptor tyrosine kinase.

Kinase inhibitors can also be mediated. Paracrine signalling mediates the response to epidermal growth factor receptor kinase inhibitors. Paracrine activates epidermal growth factor receptor in endothelial cells of the tumor to do this.

Dasatinib is a Src tyrosine kinase inhibitor that is effective both as a senolytic and as therapy for chronic myelogenous leukemia.

== Examples ==
Human proteins containing this domain include:

AATK; ABL; ABL2; ALK; AXL; BLK; BMX; BTK; CSF1R; CSK; DDR1; DDR2; EGFR; EPHA1; EPHA2; EPHA3; EPHA4; EPHA5; EPHA6; EPHA7; EPHA8; EPHA10; EPHB1; EPHB2; EPHB3; EPHB4; EPHB6; ERBB2; ERBB3; ERBB4; FER; FES; FGFR1; FGFR2; FGFR3; FGFR4; FGR; FLT1; FLT3; FLT4; FRK; FYN; GSG2; HCK; IGF1R; ILK; INSR; INSRR; IRAK4; ITK; JAK1; JAK2; JAK3; KDR; KIT; KSR1; LCK; LMTK2; LMTK3; LTK; LYN; MATK; MERTK; MET; MLTK; MST1R; MUSK; NPR1; NTRK1; NTRK2; NTRK3; PDGFRA; PDGFRB; PKDCC; PLK4; PTK2; PTK2B; PTK6; PTK7; RET; ROR1; ROR2; ROS1; RYK; SRC; SRMS; STYK1; SYK; TEC; TEK; TEX14; TIE1; TNK1; TNK2; TNNI3K; TXK; TYK2; TYRO3; YES1; ZAP70

== See also ==
- Tyrphostins
- Bcr-Abl tyrosine kinase inhibitors
- BYKdb
