= Non-receptor tyrosine kinase =

Class of kinase enzymes

Identifiers
- EC no.: 2.7.10.2

Databases
- IntEnz: IntEnz view
- BRENDA: BRENDA entry
- ExPASy: NiceZyme view
- KEGG: KEGG entry
- MetaCyc: metabolic pathway
- PRIAM: profile
- PDB structures: RCSB PDB PDBe PDBsum
- Gene Ontology: AmiGO / QuickGO
Search
- PMC: articles
- PubMed: articles
- NCBI: proteins

A non-receptor tyrosine kinase (nRTK) is a cytosolic enzyme that is responsible for catalysing the transfer of a phosphate group from a nucleoside triphosphate donor, such as ATP, to tyrosine residues in proteins. Non-receptor tyrosine kinases are a subgroup of protein family tyrosine kinases, enzymes that can transfer the phosphate group from ATP to a tyrosine residue of a protein (phosphorylation). These enzymes regulate many cellular functions by switching on or switching off other enzymes in a cell.

Unlike the receptor tyrosine kinases (RTKs), the second subgroup of tyrosine kinases, the non-receptor tyrosine kinases are cytosolic enzymes. Thirty-two non-receptor tyrosine kinases have been identified in human cells (EC 2.7.10.2). Non-receptor tyrosine kinases regulate cell growth, proliferation, differentiation, adhesion, migration and apoptosis, and they are critical components in the regulation of the immune system.

== Function ==
The main function of nRTKs is their involvement in signal transduction in activated T- and B-cells in the immune system. Signaling by many receptors is dependent on nRTKs including T-cell receptors (TCR), B-cell receptors (BCR), IL-2 receptors (IL-2R), Ig receptors, erythropoietin (EpoR) and prolactin receptors. CD4 and CD8 receptors on T lymphocytes require for their signaling the Src family member Lck. When antigen binds to T-cell receptor, Lck becomes autophosphorylated and phosphorylates the zeta chain of the T-cell receptor, subsequently another nRTK, Zap70, binds to this T-cell receptor and then participates in downstream signaling events that mediate transcriptional activation of cytokine genes. Another Src family member Lyn is involved in signaling mediated by B-cell receptor. Lyn is activated by stimulation of B-cell receptor, which leads to the recruitment and phosphorylation of Zap70-related nRTK, Syk. Another nRTK, Btk, is also involved in signaling mediated by the B-cell receptor. Mutations in the Btk gene are responsible for X-linked agammaglobulinemia, a disease characterized by the lack of mature B-cells.

== Structure ==
Unlike receptor tyrosine kinases, nRTKs lack receptor-like features such as an extracellular ligand-binding domain and a transmembrane-spanning region. Most of the nRTKs are localized in the cytoplasm, but some nRTKs are anchored to the cell membrane through amino-terminal modification. These enzymes commonly have a modular construction and individual domains are joined together by flexible linker sequences. One important domain of nRTKs is the tyrosine kinase catalytic domain, which is about 275 residues in length. The structure of the catalytic domain can be divided into a small and a large lobe, where ATP binds to the small lobe and the protein substrate binds to the large lobe. Upon the binding of ATP and substrate to nRTKs, catalysis of phosphate transfer occurs in a cleft between these two lobes. It was found that nRTKs have some sequence preference around the target Tyr. For example, the Src preferred sequence is Glu–Glu/Asp–Ile–Tyr–Gly/Glu–Glu–Phe and Abl preferred sequence is Ile/Val–Tyr–Gly–Val–Leu/Val. Different preferred sequences around Tyr in Src and Abl suggest that these two types of nRTKs phosphorylates different targets. Non-receptor tyrosine kinases do not contain only a tyrosine kinase domain, nRTKs also possess domains that mediate protein-protein, protein-lipid, and protein-DNA interactions. One of the protein-protein interaction domains in nRTKs are the Src homology 2 (SH2) and 3 (SH3) domains. The longer SH2 domain (~100 residues) binds phosphotyrosine (P-Tyr) residues in a sequence-specific manner. The P-Tyr interacts with SH domain in a deep cleft, which cannot bind unphosphorylated Tyr. The SH3 domain is smaller (~60 residues) and binds proline-containing sequences capable of forming a polyproline type II helix. Some nRTKs without SH2 and SH3 domains possess some subfamily-specific domains used for protein-protein interactions. For example, specific domains that target enzymes to the cytoplasmic part of cytokine receptors (Jak family) or two domains: an integrin-binding domain and a focal adhesion-binding domain (Fak family). The nRTK Abl possess the SH2 and SH3 domains, but also possesses other domains for interactions: F actin–binding domain and a DNA-binding domain contains a nuclear localization signal and is found in both the nucleus and the cytoplasm. In addition to SH2 and SH3 domains, Btk/Tec subfamily of nRTKs possess another modular domain, a pleckstrin homology (PH) domain. These PH domains bind to phosphatidylinositol lipids that have been phosphorylated at particular positions on the head group. These enzymes can bind to activated signaling complexes at the membrane through PH domain interactions with phosphorylated phosphatidylinositol lipids.

== Regulation ==
The most common theme in nRTKs and RTK regulation is tyrosine phosphorylation. With few exceptions, phosphorylation of tyrosines in the activation loop of nRTKs leads to an increase in enzymatic activity. Activation loop phosphorylation occurs via trans-autophosphorylation or phosphorylation by different nRTKs. It is possible to negatively regulate kinase activity by the phosphorylation of tyrosines outside of the activation loop. Protein tyrosine phosphatases (PTPs) restore nRTKs to their basal state of activity. In some cases PTPs positively regulate nRTKs activity.

=== Src and Abl ===
Tyrosine kinases of Src family contain the same typical structure: myristoylated terminus, a region of positively charged residues, a short region with low sequence homology, SH3 and SH2 domains, a tyrosine kinase domain, and a short carboxy-terminal tail. There are two important regulatory tyrosine phosphorylation sites. To repress kinase activity it is possible by phosphorylation of Tyr-527 in the carboxy-terminal tail of Src by the nRTK Csk. By the experiment of v-Src, an oncogenic variant of Src, the importance of this phosphorylation site was confirmed. This oncogenic v-Src is a product of the Rous sarcoma virus and as a result of an carboxy-terminal truncation, v-Src lacks the negative regulatory site Tyr-527 leading this enzyme to be constitutively active that in turn causes uncontrolled growth of infected cells. Moreover, substitution of this tyrosine with phenylalanine in c-Src results in activation. A second regulatory phosphorylation site in Src is Tyr-416. This is an autophosphorylation site in the activation loop. It was found that a phosphorylation of Tyr-416 and Tyr-416 can suppressing the transforming ability of the activating Tyr-527→Phe mutation by Tyr-416→Phe mutation leads to maximal stimulation of kinase activity.

Both the SH2 and SH3 domains are important for a negative regulation of Src activity. Mutations in the SH2 and SH3 domains that disrupt binding of phosphotyrosine lead to activation of kinase activity. Although the nRTK Abl contains SH3, SH2, and kinase domains in the same linear order as in Src, regulation of Abl is different. Abl lacks the negative regulatory phosphorylation site that is present in the carboxy terminus of Src, so the carboxy terminus of Abl does not have a functional role in the control of kinase activity. In a contrast to Src, mutations in the SH2 domain of Abl that abrogates phosphotyrosine binding do not activate Abl in vivo. For the repression of kinase activity of Abl is important the SH3 domain; mutations in the SH3 domain result in activation of Abl and cellular transformation.

=== ZAP70/Syk and JAKs ===
The kinase activity of Syk is regulated by the SH2 domains. Binding of the two SH2 domains to the tyrosine-phosphorylated ITAM (immunoreceptor tyrosine-based activation motif) sequences in the zeta chain of the T-cell receptor is thought to relieve an inhibitory restraint on the kinase domain, leading to stimulation of catalytic activity. Kinase activity of Zap70 can be increased by phosphorylation of Tyr-493 in the activation loop by Src family member Lck. Conversely the phosphorylation of Tyr-492 inhibit the kinase activity of Zap70; the mutation of Tyr-492 to phenylalanine results in Zap70 hyperactivity.

Jak family members possess a fully functional tyrosine kinase domain and additionally pseudo-kinase domain in which substitution of several key catalytic residues leads to inactivation of kinase activity. This pseudo-kinase domain is enzymatically nonfunctional, but maybe it plays a role in the regulation of Jak activity. The experiments with a mutant of the Jak family member Tyk2, in which the pseudo-kinase domain is deleted, showed that these mutant enzyme lacks catalytic activity in vitro and is not capable of interferon-mediated signal transduction. In contrast, another mutant of the Jak family Jak2, also lacking the pseudo-kinase domain, was able to mediate growth hormone signaling. The role of the pseudo-kinase domain in Jak regulation is still not fully understood. There are two tyrosine phosphorylation sites within the activation loop. It is known that the autophosphorylation of the first of these tyrosines is important for stimulation of tyrosine kinase activity and biological function, but the role of the second tyrosine is not clear.

JAKs are also regulated by SOCS (suppressor of cytokine signaling) proteins. These proteins contain a pseudo-substrate sequence thought to interfere with Jak substrate binding and phosphoryl transfer. In addition to a pseudo-substrate sequence, SOCS proteins possess an SH2 domain that binds to a phosphotyrosine in the Jak activation loop, which may facilitate interaction between the pseudosubstrate sequence and the kinase domain. Binding of the SH2 domain to the activation loop could also block substrate access directly or alter the conformation of the activation loop to repress catalytic activity.

== Inhibitors ==
The mutation in a gene for non-receptor tyrosine kinase can results an aberrant activity of this enzyme. This pathologically increased activity of nRTK may be responsible for growth and progression of cancer cells, the induction of drug-resistance, formation of metastasis and tumor neovascularization. The inhibition of nRTKs could help to a treatment of these tumors. Some of nRTKs inhibitors are already tested as an anti-cancer agents. This targeted therapy blocks intracellular processes involved in the tumor transformation of cells and / or maintenance of malignant phenotype of tumor cells. Usually monoclonal antibodies are used for the targeted blockade of RTK, which block the extracellular domain of the receptor and prevent the binding of a ligand. For the specific blockade of nRTKs, however, low molecular weight substances called Tyrosine-kinase inhibitor (TKIs) are used, that block the transduction cascade either at the intracytosplasmatic level, or directly block the nRTKs.

== Examples ==
Examples of non-receptor tyrosine kinases include:

- ABL family
  - ABL1
  - ARG
- ACK family
  - ACK1
  - TNK1
- CSK family
  - CSK
  - MATK
- FAK family
  - FAK
  - PYK2
- FES family
  - FES
  - FER
- FRK family
  - FRK
  - BRK
  - SRMS
- JAK family
  - JAK1
  - JAK2
  - JAK3
  - TYK2
- SRC family
  - SRC
  - FGR
  - FYN
  - YES1
  - BLK
  - HCK
  - LCK
  - LYN
- SYK family
  - SYK
  - ZAP70
- TEC family
  - TEC
  - BMX
  - BTK
  - ITK
  - TXK
