= TXK (disambiguation) =

TXK (Telephone eXchange Crossbar) was a range of Crossbar exchanges used by the British Post Office telephone network, subsequently BT, between 1964 and 1994.

TXK may also refer to:

- TXK (airport) (Texarkana Regional Airport, also known as Webb Field), an airport located near Texarkana, Arkansas
- TXK (gene), a gene that encodes the related Tyrosine-protein kinase TXK enzyme
- TxK, an action video game for the PlayStation Vita developed by Llamasoft
