= TEC (gene) =

Human gene

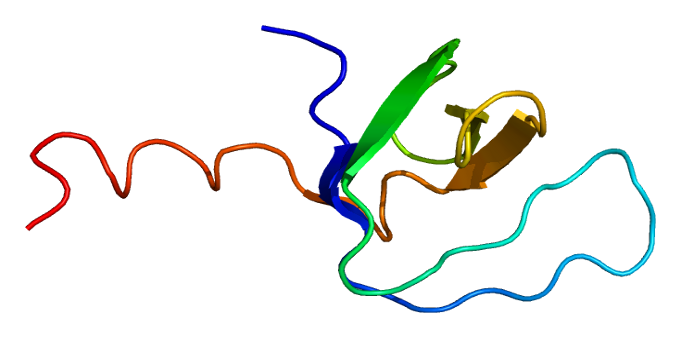

Identifiers
- Aliases: TEC, PSCTK4, tec protein tyrosine kinase
- External IDs: OMIM: 600583; MGI: 98662; GeneCards: TEC
Available structures
| PDB | Ortholog search: PDBe RCSB |
| PDB | List of PDB id codes 2LUL |
Enzyme activity
| EC # | BRENDA | ExPASy | KEGG | MetaCyc |
|---|---|---|---|---|
| 2.7.10.2 | ↗ | ↗ | ↗ | ↗ |

Gene location (Human)
| Chr. | Chromosome 4 (human) |
| Band | 4p12-p11 | Start | 48,135,783 bp |
| Band | 4p12-p11 | End | 48,269,838 bp |

Gene location (Mouse)
| Chr. | Chromosome 5 (mouse) |
| Band | 5 C3.2|5 38.44 cM | Start | 72,913,059 bp |
| Band | 5 C3.2|5 38.44 cM | End | 73,025,826 bp |
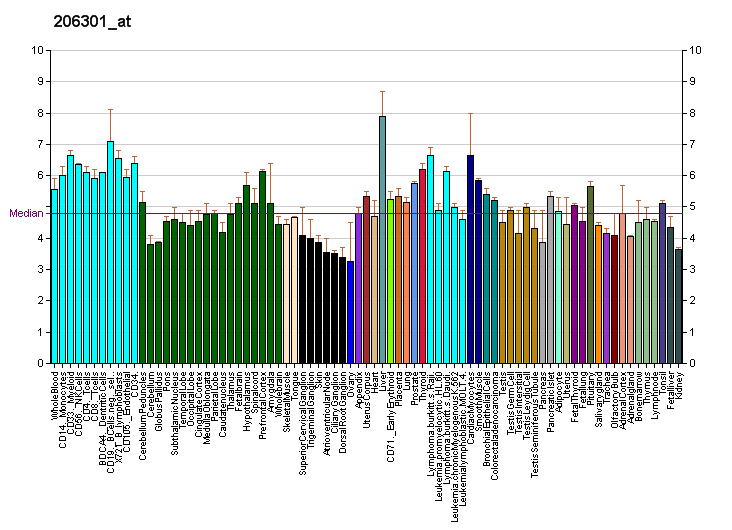
RNA expression pattern
| Bgee | Human / Mouse (ortholog); Top expressed in: gonad; bone marrow cell; testicle; skin of leg; skin of abdomen; monocyte; right uterine tube; rectum; right lung; right adrenal cortex / Top expressed in: sciatic nerve; granulocyte; spleen; left lobe of liver; mesenteric lymph nodes; blood; proximal tubule; bone marrow; right kidney; iris; More reference expression data |
| BioGPS | More reference expression data |
Gene ontology
| Molecular function | transferase activity; nucleotide binding; protein kinase activity; non-membrane spanning protein tyrosine kinase activity; metal ion binding; kinase activity; protein binding; protein tyrosine kinase activity; signaling receptor binding; phospholipid binding; ATP binding; lipid binding |
| Cellular component | cytoplasm; cytosol; membrane; extrinsic component of cytoplasmic side of plasma membrane; cytoskeleton; plasma membrane |
| Biological process | B cell receptor signaling pathway; cell differentiation; intracellular signal transduction; adaptive immune response; phosphorylation; transmembrane receptor protein tyrosine kinase signaling pathway; immune system process; Fc-epsilon receptor signaling pathway; protein phosphorylation; regulation of cell population proliferation; positive regulation of peptidyl-tyrosine phosphorylation; peptidyl-tyrosine autophosphorylation; integrin-mediated signaling pathway; peptidyl-tyrosine phosphorylation; regulation of platelet activation; innate immune response; tissue regeneration; cytokine-mediated signaling pathway; T cell receptor signaling pathway |
Sources:Amigo / QuickGO
Orthologs
| Databases | NCBI: entry; OMA: entry |
| Species | Human | Mouse |
| Entrez | 7006 | 21682 |
| Ensembl | ENSG00000135605 | ENSMUSG00000029217 |
| UniProt | P42680 | P24604 |
| RefSeq (mRNA) | NM_003215 | NM_001113460; NM_001113461; NM_001113464; NM_013689 |
| RefSeq (protein) | NP_003206 | NP_001106931; NP_001106932; NP_001106935; NP_038717 |
| Location (UCSC) | Chr 4: 48.14 – 48.27 Mb | Chr 5: 72.91 – 73.03 Mb |
| PubMed search |
- Wikidata
| View/Edit Human | View/Edit Mouse |

Tyrosine-protein kinase Tec is a tyrosine kinase that in humans is encoded by the TEC gene. Tec kinase is expressed in hematopoietic, liver, and kidney cells and plays an important role in T-helper cell processes. Tec kinase is the name-giving member of the Tec kinase family, a family of non-receptor protein-tyrosine kinases.

== Structure ==
Tec kinase contains five protein interaction domains. The characteristic feature of Tec family kinases is a pleckstrin homology (PH) domain on the N-terminus of the molecule followed by a Tec homology (TH) domain. The TH domain of Tec kinase contains a Btk homology (BH) motif and two proline-rich (PR) regions. The other protein interaction domains of Tec kinase include Src homology (SH) domains SH2 and SH3 and a kinase domain with enzymatic activity.

TEC produces two protein isoforms that differ in the SH3 domain through alternative splicing. Type IV isoform has a full length SH3 domain and is predominately expressed in hematopoietic cells. Type III isoform has a SH3 domain that lacks the COOH-terminal 22 residues and is predominately expressed in the liver and kidney. It is likely the shortened SH3 domain of type III Tec kinase is a disabled form.

TEC resides on chromosome 4, locus 4p12 in humans. TEC is located only 1.5kb away from TXK, another member of the Tec kinase family, making it likely these two kinase genes arose through the process of gene-duplication.

== Function ==
=== Functions of Tec family kinases ===
Tec family kinases are involved in the intracellular signaling mechanisms of cytokine receptors, lymphocyte surface antigens, heterotrimeric G-protein-coupled receptors, and integrin molecules. They are also key players in the regulation of the immune functions.

=== Functions of Tec kinase ===
==== Lymphoid Cells ====
Tec kinase has low expression in naïve T cells but is upregulated upon T-cell activation, especially in the presence of TGF-ß1 and IL-6. Tec kinase is activated in T cells in response to CD3 engagement and TCR/CD28 stimulation. Tec kinase plays an important role in T-cell activation. Upon TCR/CD28 stimulation, Tec kinase is recruited to the cytoplasmic tail of CD28 and takes part in a signaling pathway that leads to activation of IL-2 and IL-4 cytokine promoters. It is likely Tec kinase plays a regulatory role in this signaling pathway in activated T cells, but its full function is not known.

Tec kinase also contributes to T-helper cell functions. In Th2 cells, Tec kinase is upregulated, indicating it may perform an important function in the regulation of Th2 cells. In the absence of Tec kinase, an increase in Th17 effector/memory cells is observed during a primary immune response, indicating Tec kinase may help in controlling Th17 subsets. Additionally, Th17 cells in the absence of Tec kinase produced higher levels of IL-17A, IL-17F, IL-23R, and RORγt. This indicates Tec kinase could be used as a target to enhance Th17 cell function during reinfection with pathogens.

Tec kinase is expressed in B cells and is activated upon B-cell receptor stimulation. However, there are no B-cell phenotype changes detected in Tec-deficient mice. This is likely because Tec has overlapping functions with Btk, another member of the Tec kinase family. Deletion of Btk results in a compensatory increased expression of Tec kinase, but a change in B-cell phenotype is observed, indicating Btk has a more important role in B-cell development than Tec. When both Btk and Tec are deleted, a severe B-cell deficiency is observed.

==== Myeloid Cells ====
Tec kinase plays a role in the toll-like receptor (TLR) signaling pathway of macrophages that produces pro-inflammatory cytokines TNF-α and IL-6. Btk has an important function in this pathway, as it has been observed to bind to TLR4, MyD88, and IRAK-1 signaling proteins. Tec kinase is likely involved in the same manner in macrophages, as it has a compensatory function for Btk.

Tec kinase is activated in platelets upon platelet stimulation with thrombin or collagen. Tec kinase is involved in the regulation of PLCγ2 activation, platelet aggregation, and spreading GPVI collagen receptor. Btk plays a more important role in these processes, but Tec kinase is able to compensate for loss of Btk in XLA immune-deficient patients. Patients deficient in both Btk and Tec kinase display greatly impaired phosphorylation of PLCγ2, no aggregation of platelets in response to high doses of collagen, and greatly impaired spreading of collagen.

Tec kinase is activated in neutrophils upon neutrophil stimulation with chemoattractant fMLP. It is not clear what the function of Tec kinase is in neutrophils. Tec kinase is also expressed in primary mast cells and erythroid cells. Its function has not been identified in these cells.

== Activation ==
Tec kinase is activated through a similar process to other members of the Tec kinase family. Tec kinase must first be relocated to the plasma membrane, which is mediated by the interaction of its PH domain with phospholipid PIP_{3} generated from PI3-K activity. A tyrosine residue within the kinase domain of Tec kinase is then phosphorylated by Src family kinases. This allows for autophosphorylation of a tyrosine residue in the Tec kinase SH3 domain, which allows the Tec kinase to be fully activated.

== Clinical Significance ==
Rheumatoid arthritis (RA) is an autoimmune disorder that results in swollen, painful joints. Standard treatment for RA involves recombinant antibodies and receptors, but this biological therapy is costly. Inhibition of Tec family kinases may provide an alternative treatment for RA. Btk is the main target of inhibition, but because of the compensatory role of Tec kinase to Btk, an inhibition involving both Btk and Tec kinase may be needed. Blocking Tec family kinases could reduce the production of autoantibodies from B cells, limit the secretion of proinflammatory cytokines from macrophages, and inhibit mast cell degranulation. There are no known inhibitors of Tec kinase at the present. However, Tec kinase is downregulated by dephosphorylation of PIP_{3} by phosphatase enzyme SHIP and by SH2-containing tyrosine phosphatase SHP-1.

Chronic myeloid leukemia (CML) is a cancer of the white blood cells in which granulocytes proliferate. Tyrosine kinase inhibitors are largely used for treatment. Dasatinib is a tyrosine kinase inhibitor that has been found to bind to Tec kinase and Btk, limiting release of histamine and proinflammatory cytokines from granulocytes. Dasatinib has also been found to inhibit T-cell effector functions through Tec family kinase inhibition, suggesting this drug could be used to suppress immune response for transplantation and T-cell autoimmune diseases.

TEC gene may also be associated with myelodysplastic syndrome.

== Discovery ==
Tec kinase was first discovered in 1990 while researchers investigated mouse liver for novel protein-tyrosine kinase isolation. Expression of Tec kinase was initially found in mouse liver, kidney, spleen, and heart.

== Interactions ==
TEC (gene) has been shown to interact with:

- ARHGEF12,
- CD117,
- DOK1,
- GNA12,
- Janus kinase 2, and
- Suppressor of cytokine signaling 1.
