= Src family kinase =

Protein-tyrosine kinase family of enzymes

Src kinase

Identifiers
- Symbol: Src
- CDD: cd05071

Src kinase family is a family of non-receptor tyrosine kinases that includes nine members: Src, Yes, Fyn, and Fgr, forming the SrcA subfamily, Lck, Hck, Blk, and Lyn in the SrcB subfamily, and Frk in its own subfamily. Frk has homologs in invertebrates such as flies and worms, and Src homologs exist in organisms as diverse as unicellular choanoflagellates, but the SrcA and SrcB subfamilies are specific to vertebrates. Src family kinases contain six conserved domains: a N-terminal myristoylated segment, a SH2 domain, a SH3 domain, a linker region, a tyrosine kinase domain, and C-terminal tail.

Src family kinases interact with many cellular cytosolic, nuclear and membrane proteins, modifying these proteins by phosphorylation of tyrosine residues. A number of substrates have been discovered for these enzymes. Deregulation, including constitutive activation or over expression, may contribute to the progression of cellular transformation and oncogenic activity.

== Structure ==
Src family kinases contain six distinct domains including a myristoylated N-terminal segment, an SH2 domain, an SH3 domain, a linker region, a tyrosine kinase domain, and a C-terminal tail. Src kinases are known for having a characteristically short C-terminal tail that contains an autoinhibitory phosphorylation site. The SH2 and SH3 domains exist in a conformation that locks the catalytic domain into an inactive state.

=== Myristoylated N-terminus ===
Myristoylation is a post-translational modification marked by the covalent attachment of a myristoyl group to an N-terminal glycine residue. It allows for weak protein-protein and protein-lipid interactions. Myristoylation aids in the membrane association of Src kinases.

=== SH2 and SH3 domains ===
The SH2 domain of Src family kinases consist of approximately 100 amino acids. This domain acts by binding to phosphorylated tyrosine residues. The strength of binding is dependent on the amino acids surrounding the phosphorylated tyrosine. The Src kinases Fyn, Src, and Yes all bind via their SH2 domains. SH2 domains of Src family kinases play an important role in binding to growth factor receptors as well as regulating the activity of Src kinases.

=== Linker region ===
The linker region of Src kinase consists of a SH2-kinase linker which intercalates between the SH3 domain and the N-terminal domain lobe. When comparing the linker regions of various members of the Src family, they were found to have little sequence similarity

=== Tyrosine kinase domain ===
Tyrosine kinase domains selectively phosphorylate tyrosine residues. The tyrosine kinase domain of Src contains around 300 amino acid residues and consists of an N-terminal lobe with β-sheets and α-helices, and a C-terminal lobe that is composed primarily of α-helices.

=== C-terminal tail ===
The C-terminal tail is a location of phosphorylation and dephosphorylation in Src family kinases. In c-Src, this occurs at the tyrosine residue 527. When looking at other Src molecules, most are phosphorylated at this tyrosine residue by action of the Csk family protein kinases.

== Mechanism ==
=== Activation ===
Src kinases are activated through a variety of ligands binding to the SH2 and SH3 domains. They can also be activated through the SH3 domain being displaced while SH2 remains engaged with the C-terminal tail. Src can be activated by receptor tyrosine kinases such as EGFR and HGF receptors. Src kinases are recruited to and activated by these receptors through the interaction of its SH2 domain with the phosphorylated tyrosine receptor. Src kinases can also be activated through displacement of their SH3 domain. When this occurs, the SH2 domains stay in contact with the C-terminal tail. An absence of regulatory proteins will also affect Src's ability to be activated properly.

=== Localization ===
Subcellular localization of Src kinases indicate their function. Src is known to associate with cell membranes, specifically the plasma membrane, the perinuclear membrane, and endosomal membranes. Membrane association is partly due to the myristoyl group at the N-terminus being able to covalently attach to the membranes. Other amino acid residues at the N-terminus are important for membrane association as well because they allow Src to associate with fusion protein constructs. Myristoylation and fusion proteins work together to localize Src to cellular membranes.

== Function ==
Src kinases transduce signals related to cellular processes such as proliferation, differentiation, motility, and adhesion. Src kinase activation leads to an increase in these processes, so Src's functionality is linked to human cancer development. Inhibiting Src kinases is often a target or goal of anti-cancer drugs.

=== STATs and Src family kinase ===
Signal transducers and activators of transcription (STATs) are activated by Src family kinases in addition to growth factor receptors. STAT activation by Src family kinases often occurs downstream of growth factor receptor kinases. It has been shown that Src kinase activity is oftentimes for EGF signaling. The activation of STAT is a known requirement for tumor proliferation.

==== Breast cancer model ====
70% of breast cancer cells overexpress tyrosine kinases (specifically c-Src). A combination of c-Src and EGFR are often co-expressed in later stage tumors. This co-expression leads to a synergistic increase in mitogenesis, transformation, and tumorigenesis. Specifically, it has been found that Tyr845 in the catalytic domain of EGFR is not auto-phosphorylated. Later, it requires an association of c-Src with EGFR as well as the kinase activity of c-Src.

== See also ==
- Proto-oncogene tyrosine-protein kinase Src
- Myristoylation
- SH2 domain
- SH3 domain
