= BMX (gene) =

Type of enzyme

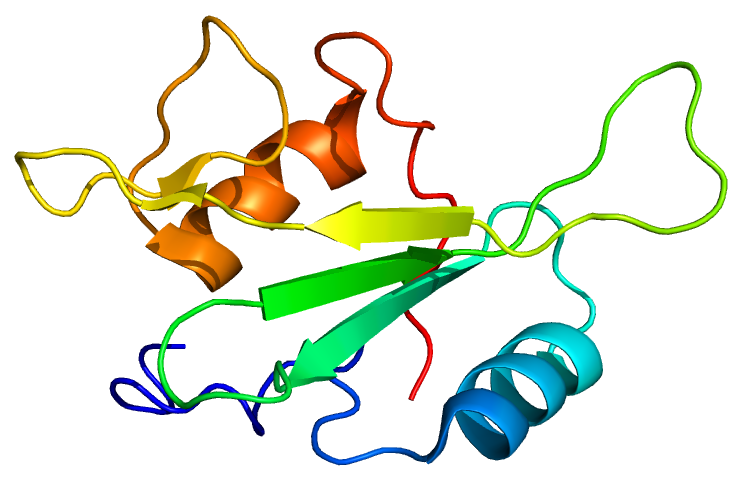

Identifiers
- Aliases: BMX, ETK, PSCTK2, PSCTK3, BMX non-receptor tyrosine kinase
- External IDs: OMIM: 300101; MGI: 1101778; GeneCards: BMX
Available structures
PDB	Ortholog search: PDBe RCSB
PDB	List of PDB id codes 2EKX, 2YS2, 3SXR, 3SXS
Enzyme activity
EC #	BRENDA	ExPASy	KEGG	MetaCyc
2.7.10.2	↗	↗	↗	↗

Gene location (Human)
Chr.	X chromosome (human)
Band	Xp22.2	Start	15,464,246 bp
Band	Xp22.2	End	15,556,529 bp

Gene location (Mouse)
Chr.	X chromosome (mouse)
Band	X|X F5	Start	162,975,838 bp
Band	X|X F5	End	163,041,189 bp
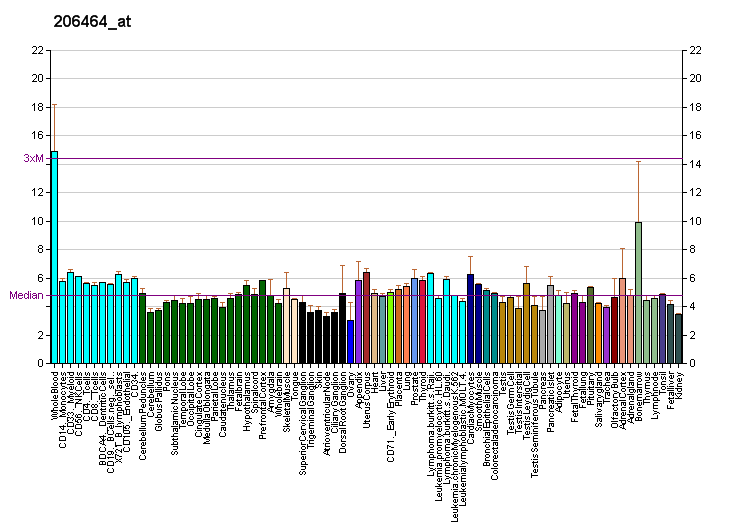
RNA expression pattern
Bgee	Human / Mouse (ortholog); Top expressed in: corpus epididymis; right auricle of heart; bone marrow; cardiac muscle tissue of right atrium; testicle; right coronary artery; subcutaneous adipose tissue; right lung; Achilles tendon; urethra / Top expressed in: granulocyte; atrioventricular valve; atrium; lumbar spinal ganglion; tunica media of zone of aorta; zygote; tibiofemoral joint; endocardial cushion; right lung lobe; bone marrow; More reference expression data
BioGPS	More reference expression data
Gene ontology
Molecular function	transferase activity; nucleotide binding; protein kinase activity; signal transducer activity; metal ion binding; kinase activity; protein binding; protein tyrosine kinase activity; signaling receptor binding; ATP binding; non-membrane spanning protein tyrosine kinase activity
Cellular component	cytoplasm; cytosol; extrinsic component of cytoplasmic side of plasma membrane; ruffle membrane; nucleoplasm; plasma membrane
Biological process	intracellular signal transduction; phosphorylation; NK T cell differentiation; transmembrane receptor protein tyrosine kinase signaling pathway; protein phosphorylation; cell adhesion; regulation of cell population proliferation; peptidyl-tyrosine autophosphorylation; protein autophosphorylation; mesoderm development; innate immune response; signal transduction; apoptotic process; phosphatidylinositol biosynthetic process; adaptive immune response; B cell receptor signaling pathway
Sources:Amigo / QuickGO
Orthologs
Databases	NCBI: entry; OMA: entry
Species	Human	Mouse
Entrez	660	12169
Ensembl	ENSG00000102010	ENSMUSG00000031377
UniProt	P51813	P97504
RefSeq (mRNA)	NM_001721; NM_203281; NM_001320866	NM_009759
RefSeq (protein)	NP_001307795; NP_001712; NP_975010	NP_033889
Location (UCSC)	Chr X: 15.46 – 15.56 Mb	Chr X: 162.98 – 163.04 Mb
PubMed search
- Wikidata
View/Edit Human	View/Edit Mouse

Cytoplasmic tyrosine-protein kinase BMX is an enzyme that in humans is encoded by the BMX gene.

== Function ==
Tyrosine kinases are either receptor molecules, which contain transmembrane and extracellular domains, or nonreceptor proteins, which are located intracellularly. One family of nonreceptor TKs includes the genes TEC, TXK, ITK, and BTK. All of these proteins are homologs of the Drosophila Src28 TK and contain an SH3 and SH2 domain upstream of the TK domain.

== Interactions ==
BMX has been shown to interact with:

- PAK1,
- PTK2,
- PTPN21 and
- RUFY1.
