= KIF1C =

Protein-coding gene in the species Homo sapiens

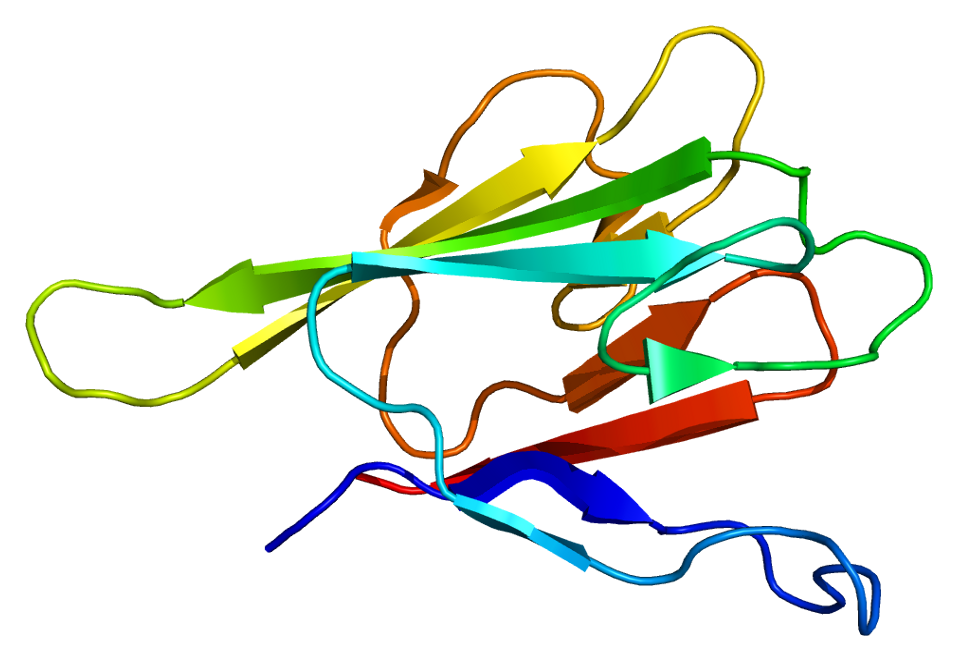

Identifiers
- Aliases: KIF1C, LTXS1, SATX2, SAX2, SPAX2, SPG58, kinesin family member 1C
- External IDs: OMIM: 603060; MGI: 1098260; GeneCards: KIF1C
Available structures
PDB	Ortholog search: PDBe RCSB
PDB	List of PDB id codes 2G1L

Gene location (Human)
Chr.	Chromosome 17 (human)
Band	17p13.2	Start	4,997,950 bp
Band	17p13.2	End	5,028,401 bp

Gene location (Mouse)
Chr.	Chromosome 11 (mouse)
Band	11|11 B3	Start	70,700,548 bp
Band	11|11 B3	End	70,731,964 bp
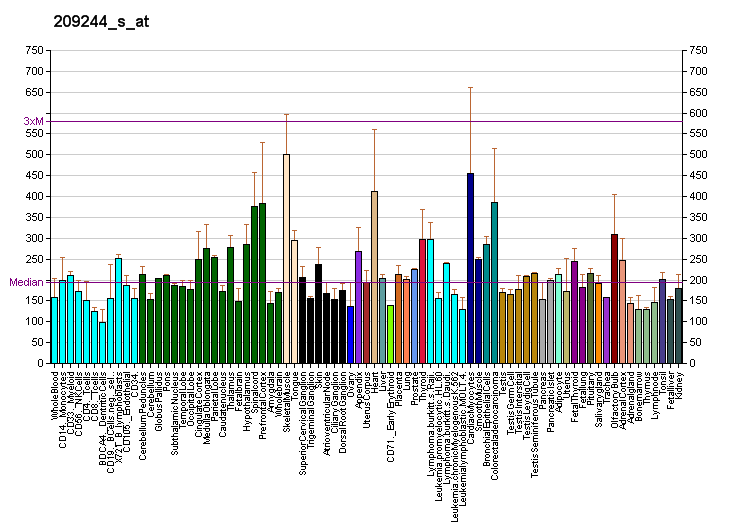
RNA expression pattern
Bgee	Human / Mouse (ortholog); Top expressed in: C1 segment; gastrocnemius muscle; muscle of thigh; apex of heart; left ventricle; right auricle of heart; Skeletal muscle tissue of rectus abdominis; amygdala; olfactory bulb; Descending thoracic aorta / Top expressed in: muscle of thigh; triceps brachii muscle; digastric muscle; vastus lateralis muscle; gastrocnemius muscle; myocardium of ventricle; sternocleidomastoid muscle; lip; ankle; ankle joint; More reference expression data
BioGPS	More reference expression data
Gene ontology
Molecular function	microtubule binding; microtubule motor activity; nucleotide binding; ATPase activity; cytoskeletal motor activity; protein binding; ATP binding; RNA binding; plus-end-directed microtubule motor activity
Cellular component	cytoplasm; Golgi apparatus; microtubule; cytoskeleton; endoplasmic reticulum; kinesin complex; axon; dendrite; neuron projection; axon cytoplasm
Biological process	cytoskeleton-dependent intracellular transport; microtubule-based movement; retrograde vesicle-mediated transport, Golgi to endoplasmic reticulum; vesicle-mediated transport; anterograde neuronal dense core vesicle transport; retrograde neuronal dense core vesicle transport
Sources:Amigo / QuickGO
Orthologs
Databases	NCBI: entry; OMA: entry
Species	Human	Mouse
Entrez	10749	16562
Ensembl	ENSG00000129250	ENSMUSG00000020821
UniProt	O43896	O35071
RefSeq (mRNA)	NM_006612	NM_153103
RefSeq (protein)	NP_006603	NP_694743
Location (UCSC)	Chr 17: 5 – 5.03 Mb	Chr 11: 70.7 – 70.73 Mb
PubMed search
- Wikidata
View/Edit Human	View/Edit Mouse

Kinesin-like protein KIF1C is a protein that in humans is encoded by the KIF1C gene. Kif1C is a fast, plus-end directed microtubule motor. It takes processive 8nm steps along microtubules and can generate forces of up to 5 pN. Kif1C transports α5β1-integrins in human cells. Kif1C has been shown to be non-essential in mouse with other proteins able to perform the same function. However, mutations in KIF1C lead to spastic paraplegia and cerebellar dysfunction in humans. These mutations usually result in a total loss of the protein or (partial) loss of function, such as significant lower force output.

== Interactions ==
KIF1C has been shown to interact with PTPN21 and YWHAG. KIF1C is a dimeric molecule that is held in an autoinhibited state by interaction of its stalk with the microtubule binding interface of the motor domain. Upon binding of PTPN21 or the cargo adapter HOOK3 to the KIF1C stalk, the motor domain is released, engages with microtubules and commences transport.
