= EPHB6 =

Protein-coding gene in the species Homo sapiens

Identifiers
- Aliases: EPHB6, HEP, EPH receptor B6
- External IDs: OMIM: 602757; MGI: 1096338; GeneCards: EPHB6

Gene location (Human)
Chr.	Chromosome 7 (human)
Band	7q34	Start	142,855,061 bp
Band	7q34	End	142,871,094 bp

Gene location (Mouse)
Chr.	Chromosome 6 (mouse)
Band	6|6 B2.1	Start	41,582,416 bp
Band	6|6 B2.1	End	41,597,443 bp
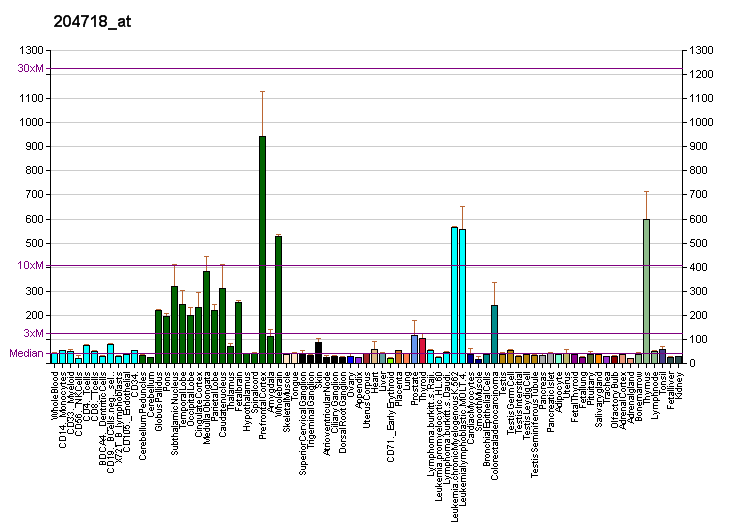
RNA expression pattern
Bgee	Human / Mouse (ortholog); Top expressed in: primary visual cortex; superior frontal gyrus; putamen; caudate nucleus; dorsolateral prefrontal cortex; right frontal lobe; anterior cingulate cortex; skin of abdomen; Brodmann area 9; prefrontal cortex / Top expressed in: lip; primary visual cortex; superior frontal gyrus; dentate gyrus of hippocampal formation granule cell; pleural cavity; pericardium; pericardial cavity; skin of external ear; prefrontal cortex; thymus; More reference expression data
BioGPS	More reference expression data
Gene ontology
Molecular function	nucleotide binding; protein kinase activity; protein binding; ATP binding; ephrin receptor activity; signaling receptor activity; protein tyrosine kinase activity; receptor tyrosine kinase; transmembrane signaling receptor activity; transmembrane-ephrin receptor activity; transmembrane receptor protein tyrosine kinase activity
Cellular component	integral component of membrane; extracellular region; cytosol; plasma membrane; integral component of plasma membrane; membrane; cytoplasm; neuron projection; receptor complex
Biological process	protein phosphorylation; transmembrane receptor protein tyrosine kinase signaling pathway; ephrin receptor signaling pathway; peptidyl-tyrosine phosphorylation; negative regulation of signal transduction; cell differentiation; negative regulation of apoptotic process; positive regulation of ERK1 and ERK2 cascade; axon guidance
Sources:Amigo / QuickGO
Orthologs
Databases	NCBI: entry; OMA: entry
Species	Human	Mouse
Entrez	2051	13848
Ensembl	ENSG00000106123; ENSG00000275482	ENSMUSG00000029869
UniProt	O15197	O08644
RefSeq (mRNA)	NM_001280794; NM_001280795; NM_004445	NM_001146351; NM_007680
RefSeq (protein)	NP_001267723; NP_001267724; NP_004436	NP_001139823; NP_031706
Location (UCSC)	Chr 7: 142.86 – 142.87 Mb	Chr 6: 41.58 – 41.6 Mb
PubMed search
- Wikidata
View/Edit Human	View/Edit Mouse

Ephrin type-B receptor 6 is a protein that in humans is encoded by the EPHB6 gene.

Ephrin receptors and their ligands, the ephrins, mediate numerous developmental processes, particularly in the nervous system. Based on their structures and sequence relationships, ephrins are divided into the ephrin-A (EFNA) class, which are anchored to the membrane by a glycosylphosphatidylinositol linkage, and the ephrin-B (EFNB) class, which are transmembrane proteins. The Eph family of receptors are divided into 2 groups based on the similarity of their extracellular domain sequences and their affinities for binding ephrin-A and ephrin-B ligands. Ephrin receptors make up the largest subgroup of the receptor tyrosine kinase (RTK) family. The ephrin receptor encoded by this gene lacks the kinase activity of most receptor tyrosine kinases and binds to ephrin-B ligands.
