= AATK =

Protein-coding gene in humans

Identifiers
- Aliases: AATK, AATYK, AATYK1, LMR1, LMTK1, PPP1R77, p35BP, apoptosis-associated tyrosine kinase, aatyk1, mKIAA0641, apoptosis associated tyrosine kinase
- External IDs: OMIM: 605276; MGI: 1197518; GeneCards: AATK
Enzyme activity
EC #	BRENDA	ExPASy	KEGG	MetaCyc
2.7.11.1	↗	↗	↗	↗

Gene location (Human)
Chr.	Chromosome 17 (human)
Band	17q25.3	Start	81,110,487 bp
Band	17q25.3	End	81,166,221 bp

Gene location (Mouse)
Chr.	Chromosome 11 (mouse)
Band	11|11 E2	Start	119,898,139 bp
Band	11|11 E2	End	119,937,993 bp
RNA expression pattern
Bgee	Human / Mouse (ortholog); Top expressed in: sural nerve; C1 segment; inferior ganglion of vagus nerve; olfactory bulb; trigeminal ganglion; right hemisphere of cerebellum; subthalamic nucleus; right frontal lobe; ventral tegmental area; putamen / Top expressed in: perirhinal cortex; entorhinal cortex; primary visual cortex; CA3 field; superior frontal gyrus; cerebellar cortex; dentate gyrus of hippocampal formation granule cell; central gray substance of midbrain; superior colliculus; nucleus of stria terminalis; More reference expression data
BioGPS	n/a
Gene ontology
Molecular function	nucleotide binding; protein serine/threonine kinase activity; protein binding; protein kinase activity; kinase activity; transferase activity; ATP binding
Cellular component	membrane; perinuclear region of cytoplasm; cytoplasm; integral component of membrane; cellular component
Biological process	phosphorylation; protein phosphorylation; biological process
Sources:Amigo / QuickGO
Orthologs
Databases	NCBI: entry; OMA: entry
Species	Human	Mouse
Entrez	9625	11302
Ensembl	ENSG00000181409	ENSMUSG00000025375
UniProt	Q6ZMQ8	Q80YE4
RefSeq (mRNA)	NM_001080395; NM_004920	NM_001198785; NM_001198787; NM_007377; NM_001377503
RefSeq (protein)	NP_001073864; NP_004911	NP_001185714; NP_001185716; NP_031403; NP_001364432; NP_001389718
Location (UCSC)	Chr 17: 81.11 – 81.17 Mb	Chr 11: 119.9 – 119.94 Mb
PubMed search
- Wikidata
View/Edit Human	View/Edit Mouse

Serine/threonine-protein kinase LMTK1 (also known as Apoptosis-associated tyrosine kinase) is an enzyme that in humans is encoded by the (AATK) gene.

== Structure and expression ==
The gene was identified in 1998. It is located on chromosome 17 (17q25.3) and is expressed in the pancreas, kidney, brain and lungs. The protein is composed of 1,207 amino acids.

== Function ==
The protein contains a tyrosine kinase domain at the N-terminal end and a proline-rich domain at the C-terminal end. Studies of the mouse homologue have indicated that it may be necessary for the induction of growth arrest and/or apoptosis of myeloid precursor cells. It may also have a role in inducing differentiation in neuronal cells. Its suppressive role on melanoma development has been reported recently.

AATK is thought to indirectly inhibit the SPAK/WNK4 activation of the Na-K-Cl cotransporter.
