= TMF1 =

Protein-coding gene in the species Homo sapiens

Identifiers
- Aliases: TMF1, ARA160, TMF, TATA element modulatory factor 1
- External IDs: OMIM: 601126; MGI: 2684999; GeneCards: TMF1

Gene location (Mouse)
Chr.	Chromosome 6 (mouse)
Band	6|6 D3	Start	97,129,958 bp
Band	6|6 D3	End	97,156,083 bp
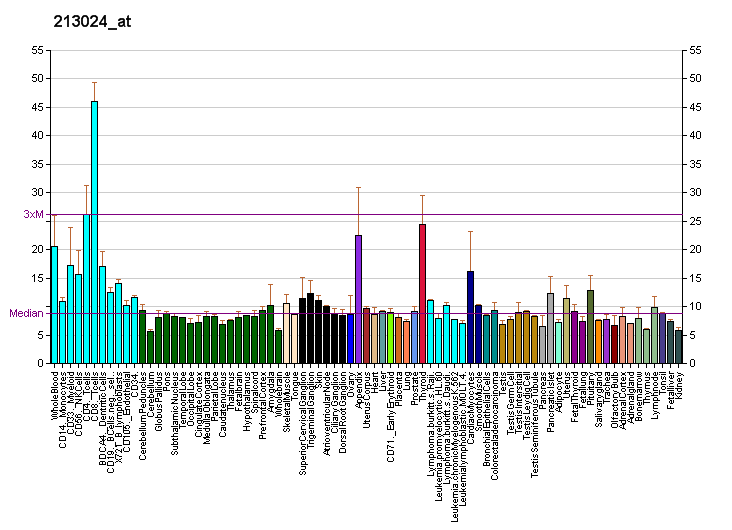
RNA expression pattern
Bgee	Human / Mouse (ortholog); Top expressed in: Achilles tendon; stromal cell of endometrium; caput epididymis; islet of Langerhans; bronchial epithelial cell; right uterine tube; corpus epididymis; rectum; body of pancreas; minor salivary glands / Top expressed in: spermatid; otolith organ; spermatocyte; utricle; zygote; iris; tail of embryo; genital tubercle; secondary oocyte; ciliary body; More reference expression data
BioGPS	More reference expression data
Gene ontology
Molecular function	DNA binding; transcription coregulator activity; protein binding
Cellular component	cytoplasm; Golgi apparatus; membrane; Golgi membrane; endoplasmic reticulum; nucleus; cytosol
Biological process	flagellated sperm motility; regulation of proteasomal protein catabolic process; male gonad development; regulation of transcription, DNA-templated; Leydig cell differentiation; positive regulation of cytokine production; cellular response to organic cyclic compound; negative regulation of apoptotic process; transcription by RNA polymerase II; negative regulation of gene expression; transcription, DNA-templated; positive regulation of testosterone secretion; defense response to bacterium; acrosome assembly; spermatid development; luteinizing hormone secretion; spermatid nucleus differentiation
Sources:Amigo / QuickGO
Orthologs
Databases	NCBI: entry
Species	Human	Mouse
Entrez	7110	232286
Ensembl	n/a	ENSMUSG00000030059
UniProt	P82094; Q6PII6	B9EKI3
RefSeq (mRNA)	NM_007114; NM_001363879	NM_001081111
RefSeq (protein)	NP_009045; NP_001350808; NP_009045.2	NP_001074580
Location (UCSC)	n/a	Chr 6: 97.13 – 97.16 Mb
PubMed search
- Wikidata
View/Edit Human	View/Edit Mouse

TATA element modulatory factor is a protein that in humans is encoded by the TMF1 gene.

== Interactions ==
TMF1 has been shown to interact with FER and Androgen receptor.
