= PTPN21 =

Protein-coding gene in the species Homo sapiens

Identifiers
- Aliases: PTPN21, PTPD1, PTPRL10, protein tyrosine phosphatase, non-receptor type 21, protein tyrosine phosphatase non-receptor type 21
- External IDs: OMIM: 603271; MGI: 1344406; GeneCards: PTPN21
Enzyme activity
EC #	BRENDA	ExPASy	KEGG	MetaCyc
3.1.3.48	↗	↗	↗	↗

Gene location (Human)
Chr.	Chromosome 14 (human)
Band	14q31.3	Start	88,465,778 bp
Band	14q31.3	End	88,555,007 bp

Gene location (Mouse)
Chr.	Chromosome 12 (mouse)
Band	12|12 E	Start	98,643,000 bp
Band	12|12 E	End	98,703,664 bp
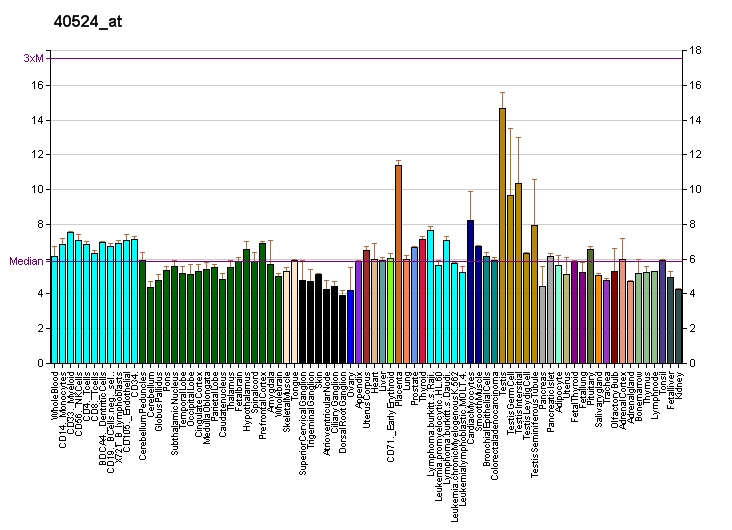

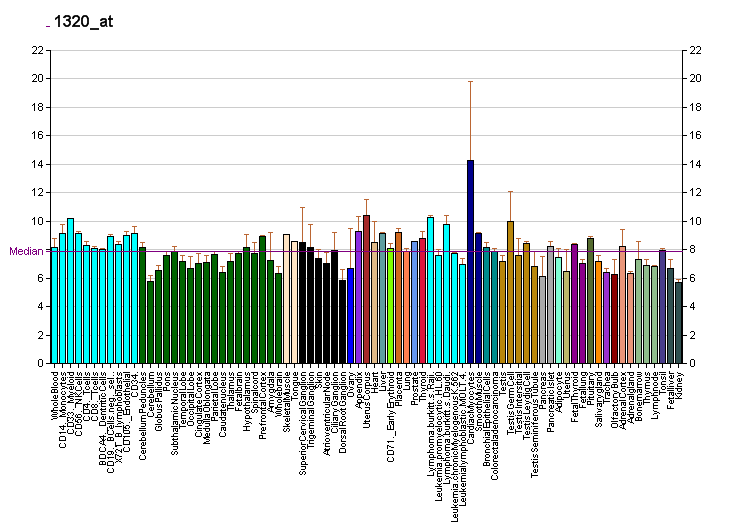

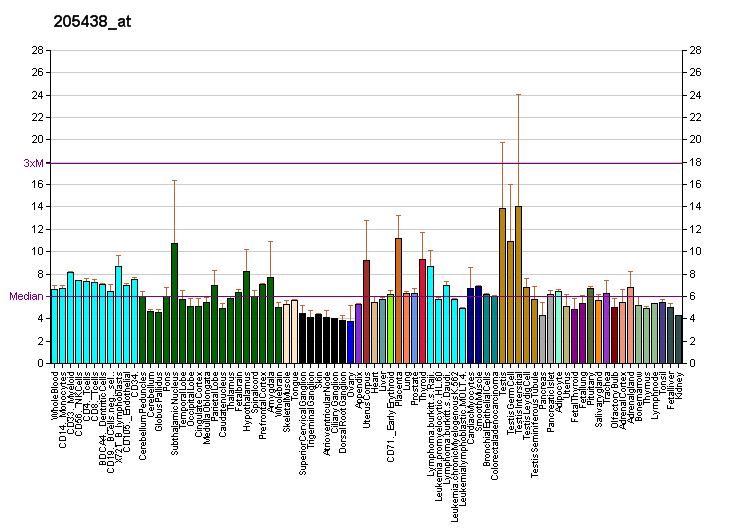
RNA expression pattern
Bgee	Human / Mouse (ortholog); Top expressed in: skin of thigh; secondary oocyte; skin of hip; lower lobe of lung; skin of abdomen; right lung; right ventricle; lactiferous duct; left testis; right testis / Top expressed in: zygote; secondary oocyte; primary oocyte; neural layer of retina; medial head of gastrocnemius muscle; sciatic nerve; extraocular muscle; muscle of thigh; cardiac muscles; internal carotid artery; More reference expression data
BioGPS	More reference expression data
Gene ontology
Molecular function	phosphoprotein phosphatase activity; hydrolase activity; phosphatase activity; protein binding; protein tyrosine phosphatase activity
Cellular component	cytoplasm; cytoskeleton
Biological process	protein dephosphorylation; dephosphorylation; peptidyl-tyrosine dephosphorylation
Sources:Amigo / QuickGO
Orthologs
Databases	NCBI: entry; OMA: entry
Species	Human	Mouse
Entrez	11099	24000
Ensembl	ENSG00000070778	ENSMUSG00000021009
UniProt	Q16825	Q62136
RefSeq (mRNA)	NM_007039	NM_001146199; NM_011877
RefSeq (protein)	NP_008970	n/a
Location (UCSC)	Chr 14: 88.47 – 88.56 Mb	Chr 12: 98.64 – 98.7 Mb
PubMed search
- Wikidata
View/Edit Human	View/Edit Mouse

Tyrosine-protein phosphatase non-receptor type 21 is an enzyme that in humans is encoded by the PTPN21 gene.

== Function ==
The protein encoded by this gene is a member of the protein tyrosine phosphatase (PTP) family. PTPs are known to be signaling molecules that regulate a variety of cellular processes including cell growth, differentiation, mitotic cycle, and oncogenic transformation. This PTP contains an N-terminal domain, similar to cytoskeletal- associated proteins including band 4.1, ezrin, merlin, and radixin. This PTP was shown to specially interact with BMX/ETK, a member of Tec tyrosine kinase family characterized by a multimodular structures including PH, SH3, and SH2 domains. The interaction of this PTP with BMX kinase was found to increase the activation of STAT3, but not STAT2 kinase. Studies of the similar gene in mice suggested the possible roles of this PTP in liver regeneration and spermatogenesis.

== Interactions ==
PTPN21 has been shown to interact with BMX and KIF1C.
