= INSRR =

Protein-coding gene in humans

Identifiers
- Aliases: INSRR, IRR, insulin receptor related receptor
- External IDs: OMIM: 147671; MGI: 1346037; GeneCards: INSRR
Enzyme activity
EC #	BRENDA	ExPASy	KEGG	MetaCyc
2.7.10.1	↗	↗	↗	↗

Gene location (Human)
Chr.	Chromosome 1 (human)
Band	1q23.1	Start	156,840,063 bp
Band	1q23.1	End	156,859,117 bp

Gene location (Mouse)
Chr.	Chromosome 3 (mouse)
Band	3 F1|3 38.7 cM	Start	87,704,258 bp
Band	3 F1|3 38.7 cM	End	87,723,408 bp
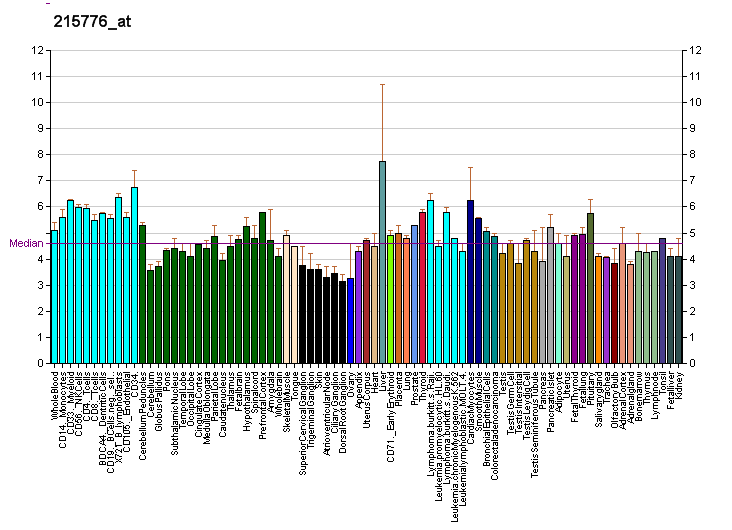
RNA expression pattern
Bgee	Human / Mouse (ortholog); Top expressed in: body of stomach; human kidney; body of uterus; right testis; apex of heart; myometrium; canal of the cervix; fundus; left testis; abdominal wall / Top expressed in: islet of Langerhans; right kidney; cingulate gyrus; embryo; internal carotid artery; external carotid artery; central gray substance of midbrain; glossopharyngeal ganglion; nucleus of stria terminalis; human kidney; More reference expression data
BioGPS	More reference expression data
Gene ontology
Molecular function	transmembrane receptor protein tyrosine kinase activity; phosphatidylinositol 3-kinase binding; insulin receptor substrate binding; nucleotide binding; protein kinase activity; protein tyrosine kinase activity; transferase activity; ATP binding; kinase activity; receptor tyrosine kinase; transmembrane signaling receptor activity; insulin-activated receptor activity
Cellular component	receptor complex; integral component of membrane; integral component of plasma membrane; membrane; cytoplasm; insulin receptor complex; axon
Biological process	actin cytoskeleton reorganization; protein autophosphorylation; protein phosphorylation; cellular response to alkaline pH; male sex determination; phosphorylation; transmembrane receptor protein tyrosine kinase signaling pathway; peptidyl-tyrosine phosphorylation; insulin receptor signaling pathway; negative regulation of signal transduction; cell differentiation; glucose homeostasis; negative regulation of apoptotic process; positive regulation of ERK1 and ERK2 cascade; anatomical structure development
Sources:Amigo / QuickGO
Orthologs
Databases	NCBI: entry; OMA: entry
Species	Human	Mouse
Entrez	3645	23920
Ensembl	ENSG00000027644	ENSMUSG00000005640
UniProt	P14616	Q9WTL4
RefSeq (mRNA)	NM_014215	NM_011832
RefSeq (protein)	NP_055030	NP_035962
Location (UCSC)	Chr 1: 156.84 – 156.86 Mb	Chr 3: 87.7 – 87.72 Mb
PubMed search
- Wikidata
View/Edit Human	View/Edit Mouse

Insulin receptor-related protein is a protein that in humans is encoded by the INSRR gene.

== Function ==
The encoded protein, commonly abbreviated IRR, is an orphan receptor and one of three receptor tyrosine kinases in the insulin receptor family, alongside the insulin receptor and insulin-like growth factor 1 receptor. No endogenous peptide or protein ligand is known for IRR. In experimental systems, extracellular pH above approximately 7.9 activates the receptor and triggers autophosphorylation.

The Human Protein Atlas classifies INSRR RNA expression as cell type enhanced in renal collecting-duct intercalated cells. In rodents, IRR has been localized to non-A intercalated cells; a rat study reported basolateral localization in type B intercalated cells of the cortical collecting duct. In mice, inactivation of Insrr impairs urinary bicarbonate excretion following alkali loading, supporting a role for the receptor in renal acid–base homeostasis.

A 2023 cryo-electron microscopy study of the human IRR ectodomain, combined with mutagenesis and cell-based assays, supported a model in which alkaline pH produces electrostatic repulsion involving pH-sensitive motifs at an interprotomer interface, disrupting the autoinhibited state and promoting a scissor-like rotation into a T-shaped active conformation.
