= BYKdb =

Database of bacterially unique tyrosine-kinases proteins

Content
- Description: the Bacterial protein tYrosine Kinase database.

Contact
- Research center: Université Claude Bernard Lyon 1
- Authors: Fanny Jadeau
- Primary citation: Jadeau & al. (2012)
- Release date: 2011

Access
- Website: http://bykdb.ibcp.fr

The Bacterial protein tyrosine-kinase database (BYKdb) is a specialized database of computer-annotated bacterial tyrosine-kinases that share no resemblance with their eukaryotic counterparts.

== See also ==
- Tyrosine-kinases
