= EPHA10 =

Protein-coding gene in humans

Identifiers
- Aliases: EPHA10, EPH receptor A10
- External IDs: OMIM: 611123; MGI: 3586824; GeneCards: EPHA10

Gene location (Human)
Chr.	Chromosome 1 (human)
Band	1p34.3	Start	37,713,880 bp
Band	1p34.3	End	37,765,133 bp

Gene location (Mouse)
Chr.	Chromosome 4 (mouse)
Band	4|4 D2.2	Start	124,880,899 bp
Band	4|4 D2.2	End	124,917,800 bp
RNA expression pattern
Bgee	Human / Mouse (ortholog); Top expressed in: sperm; mucosa of transverse colon; left testis; right testis; rectum; mucosa of ileum; right frontal lobe; Brodmann area 9; nucleus accumbens; epithelium of colon / Top expressed in: piriform cortex; primary visual cortex; superior colliculus; ventral tegmental area; superior frontal gyrus; pontine nuclei; medial vestibular nucleus; medial dorsal nucleus; dorsal tegmental nucleus; inferior colliculi; More reference expression data
BioGPS	n/a
Gene ontology
Molecular function	transferase activity; nucleotide binding; protein kinase activity; transmembrane-ephrin receptor activity; kinase activity; protein binding; transmembrane receptor protein tyrosine kinase activity; protein tyrosine kinase activity; ATP binding; ephrin receptor activity; receptor tyrosine kinase; transmembrane signaling receptor activity
Cellular component	integral component of membrane; membrane; plasma membrane; integral component of plasma membrane; extracellular region; cytoplasm; neuron projection; receptor complex
Biological process	phosphorylation; transmembrane receptor protein tyrosine kinase signaling pathway; protein phosphorylation; peptidyl-tyrosine phosphorylation; ephrin receptor signaling pathway; biological process; negative regulation of signal transduction; cell differentiation; negative regulation of apoptotic process; positive regulation of ERK1 and ERK2 cascade; axon guidance
Sources:Amigo / QuickGO
Orthologs
Databases	NCBI: entry; OMA: entry
Species	Human	Mouse
Entrez	284656	230735
Ensembl	ENSG00000183317	ENSMUSG00000028876
UniProt	Q5JZY3	Q8BYG9
RefSeq (mRNA)	NM_001004338; NM_001099439; NM_173641	NM_001256432; NM_177671
RefSeq (protein)	NP_001092909; NP_775912	NP_001243361; NP_808339
Location (UCSC)	Chr 1: 37.71 – 37.77 Mb	Chr 4: 124.88 – 124.92 Mb
PubMed search
- Wikidata
View/Edit Human	View/Edit Mouse

EPH receptor A10 is a protein in humans that is encoded by the EPHA10 gene.

Ephrin receptors, the largest subfamily of receptor tyrosine kinases (RTKs), and their ephrin ligands are important mediators of cell–cell communication regulating cell attachment, shape, and mobility in neuronal and epithelial cells.
