= PTK7 =

Protein-coding gene in the species Homo sapiens

Identifiers
- Aliases: PTK7, CCK-4, CCK4, protein tyrosine kinase 7 (inactive)
- External IDs: OMIM: 601890; MGI: 1918711; GeneCards: PTK7

Gene location (Human)
Chr.	Chromosome 6 (human)
Band	6p21.1	Start	43,076,307 bp
Band	6p21.1	End	43,161,719 bp

Gene location (Mouse)
Chr.	Chromosome 17 (mouse)
Band	17|17 C	Start	46,875,397 bp
Band	17|17 C	End	46,940,430 bp
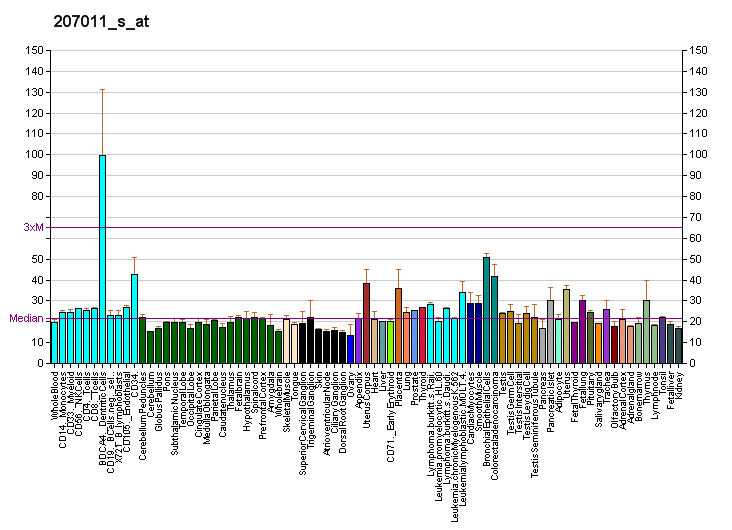
RNA expression pattern
Bgee	Human / Mouse (ortholog); Top expressed in: stromal cell of endometrium; body of uterus; left ovary; right ovary; canal of the cervix; ectocervix; right uterine tube; left uterine tube; right testis; left testis / Top expressed in: tail of embryo; lip; molar; ventricular zone; epiblast; genital tubercle; embryo; dermis; embryo; left lung lobe; More reference expression data
BioGPS	More reference expression data
Gene ontology
Molecular function	protein kinase activity; protein binding; ATP binding; coreceptor activity involved in Wnt signaling pathway, planar cell polarity pathway
Cellular component	integral component of membrane; membrane; cell-cell junction; focal adhesion; plasma membrane; cell junction; integral component of plasma membrane
Biological process	actin cytoskeleton reorganization; cellular response to retinoic acid; ventricular septum development; convergent extension; establishment of planar polarity; wound healing; Wnt signaling pathway; coronary vasculature development; planar cell polarity pathway involved in neural tube closure; protein phosphorylation; development of the heart; establishment of epithelial cell apical/basal polarity; cell adhesion; neural tube closure; axis elongation; cochlea morphogenesis; positive regulation of neuron projection development; canonical Wnt signaling pathway; lung-associated mesenchyme development; cell migration; signal transduction; positive regulation of canonical Wnt signaling pathway
Sources:Amigo / QuickGO
Orthologs
Databases	NCBI: entry; OMA: entry
Species	Human	Mouse
Entrez	5754	71461
Ensembl	ENSG00000112655	ENSMUSG00000023972
UniProt	Q13308	Q8BKG3
RefSeq (mRNA)	NM_001270398; NM_002821; NM_152880; NM_152881; NM_152882 NM_152883	NM_175168
RefSeq (protein)	NP_001257327; NP_002812; NP_690619; NP_690620; NP_690621	NP_780377
Location (UCSC)	Chr 6: 43.08 – 43.16 Mb	Chr 17: 46.88 – 46.94 Mb
PubMed search
- Wikidata
View/Edit Human	View/Edit Mouse

Tyrosine-protein kinase-like 7 also known as colon carcinoma kinase 4 (CCK4) is a receptor tyrosine kinase that in humans is encoded by the PTK7 gene.

== Function ==
Receptor protein tyrosine kinases transduce extracellular signals across the cell membrane. A subgroup of these kinases lack detectable catalytic tyrosine kinase activity but retain roles in signal transduction. The protein encoded by this gene an intracellular domain with tyrosine kinase homology and may function as a cell adhesion molecule. This gene is thought to be expressed in colon carcinomas but not in normal colon, and therefore may be a marker for or may be involved in tumor progression. Four transcript variants encoding four different isoforms have been found for this gene.

PTK7 serves as a context-dependent signalling switch for the Wnt pathways (particularly in planar cell polarity related functions such as convergent extension and neural crest cell migration) and appears to have similar functions for plexin and Flt-1 pathways. PTK7 was identified to be highly expressed in colon cancer by Saha et al. using serial analysis of gene expression (LongSAGE). Pfizer is targeting PTK7 for cancer by generating an antibody-drug conjugate against the PTK7 receptor.
