= Related to receptor tyrosine kinase =

Protein-coding gene in the species Homo sapiens

RYK

Identifiers
- Aliases: RYK, D3S3195, JTK5, JTK5A, RYK1, receptor-like tyrosine kinase, receptor like tyrosine kinase
- External IDs: OMIM: 600524; MGI: 101766; GeneCards: RYK

Gene location (Human)
Chr.	Chromosome 3 (human)
Band	3q22.2	Start	134,065,303 bp
Band	3q22.2	End	134,250,859 bp

Gene location (Mouse)
Chr.	Chromosome 9 (mouse)
Band	9 F1|9 54.72 cM	Start	102,712,116 bp
Band	9 F1|9 54.72 cM	End	102,785,504 bp
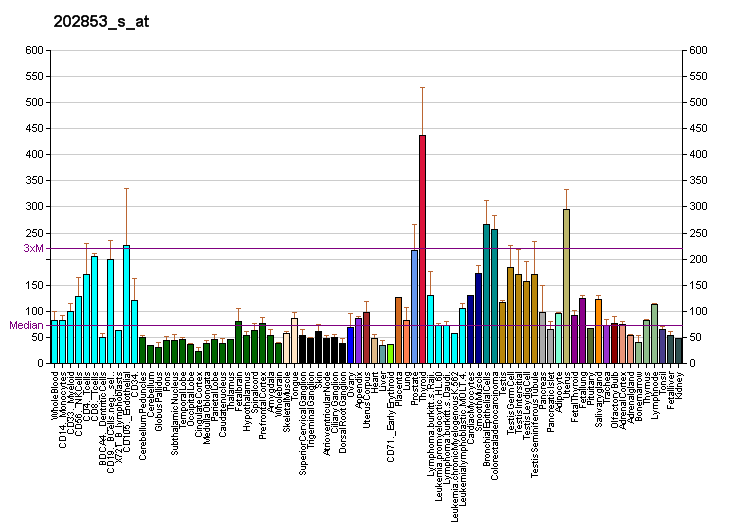

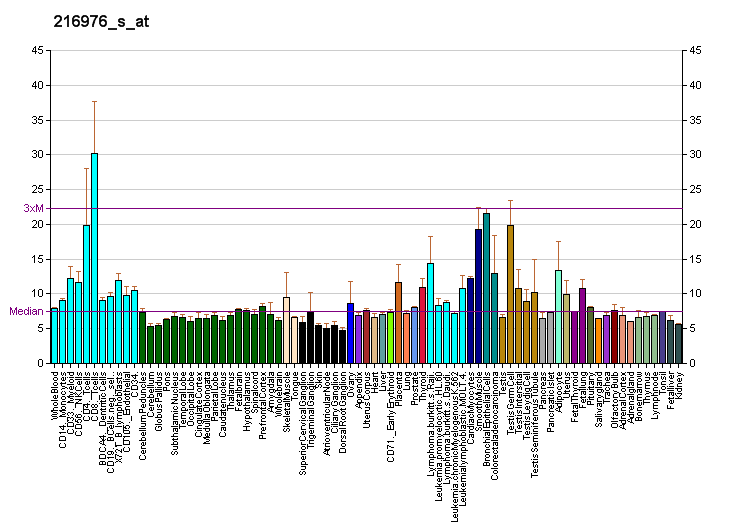

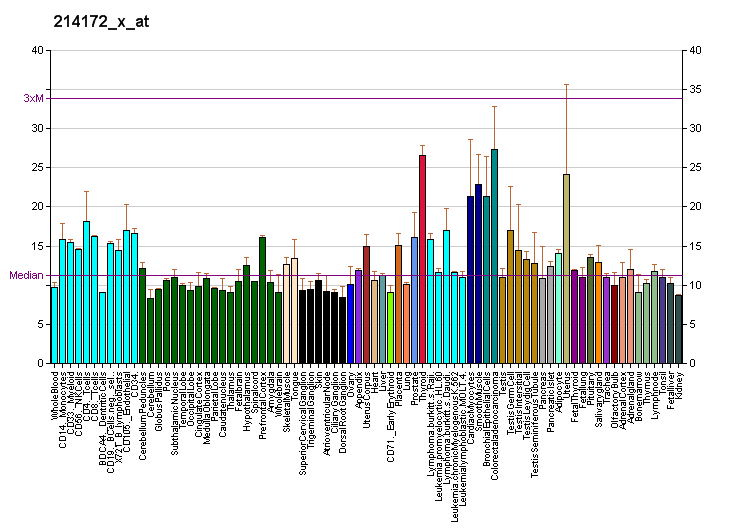
RNA expression pattern
Bgee	Human / Mouse (ortholog); Top expressed in: buccal mucosa cell; Achilles tendon; left ovary; saphenous vein; gastric mucosa; urethra; ventricular zone; germinal epithelium; right ovary; stromal cell of endometrium / Top expressed in: tail of embryo; secondary oocyte; genital tubercle; ventricular zone; zygote; lip; muscle of thigh; epiblast; calvaria; molar; More reference expression data
BioGPS	More reference expression data
Gene ontology
Molecular function	nucleotide binding; protein tyrosine kinase activity; transferase activity; transmembrane signaling receptor activity; kinase activity; Wnt-activated receptor activity; ATP binding; protein binding; frizzled binding; Wnt-protein binding; coreceptor activity involved in Wnt signaling pathway, planar cell polarity pathway; receptor tyrosine kinase; transmembrane receptor protein tyrosine kinase activity; protein kinase activity
Cellular component	cytoplasm; integral component of membrane; integral component of plasma membrane; membrane; plasma membrane; nucleus; receptor complex
Biological process	positive regulation of MAPK cascade; corpus callosum development; signal transduction; canonical Wnt signaling pathway; non-canonical Wnt signaling pathway; neurogenesis; commissural neuron axon guidance; neuron projection development; protein phosphorylation; synapse assembly; chemorepulsion of dopaminergic neuron axon; neuron differentiation; cell proliferation in midbrain; phosphorylation; axonogenesis; axon guidance; Wnt signaling pathway involved in midbrain dopaminergic neuron differentiation; midbrain dopaminergic neuron differentiation; planar cell polarity pathway involved in axon guidance; Wnt signaling pathway; peptidyl-tyrosine phosphorylation; skeletal system morphogenesis; negative regulation of axon extension involved in axon guidance; negative chemotaxis; negative regulation of signal transduction; cell differentiation; negative regulation of apoptotic process; positive regulation of ERK1 and ERK2 cascade; transmembrane receptor protein tyrosine kinase signaling pathway; nervous system development
Sources:Amigo / QuickGO
Orthologs
Databases	NCBI: entry; OMA: entry
Species	Human	Mouse
Entrez	6259	20187
Ensembl	ENSG00000163785	ENSMUSG00000032547
UniProt	P34925	Q01887
RefSeq (mRNA)	NM_001005861; NM_002958	NM_001042607; NM_013649; NM_001284258
RefSeq (protein)	NP_001005861; NP_002949	NP_001036072; NP_001271187; NP_038677
Location (UCSC)	Chr 3: 134.07 – 134.25 Mb	Chr 9: 102.71 – 102.79 Mb
PubMed search
- Wikidata
View/Edit Human	View/Edit Mouse

The related to receptor tyrosine kinase (RYK) gene encodes the protein Ryk.

The protein encoded by this gene is an atypical member of the family of growth factor receptor protein tyrosine kinases, differing from other members at a number of conserved residues in the activation and nucleotide binding domains. This gene product belongs to a subfamily whose members do not appear to be regulated by phosphorylation in the activation segment. It has been suggested that mediation of biological activity by recruitment of a signaling-competent auxiliary protein may occur through an as yet uncharacterized mechanism. Two alternative splice variants have been identified, encoding distinct isoforms.

== History ==
The gene encoding mouse RYK was first identified in 1992. Subsequently, cDNA encoding the RYK protein have been isolated from the following species.

- rat
- chicken
- Human
- Zebrafish
- Caenorhabditis elegans
- Drosophila

== Structure ==
In common with other receptor tyrosine kinase family members, RYK is composed of three domains, an N-terminal, extracellular ligand-binding domain, a transmembrane spanning domain and a C-terminal intracellular domain. However, in contrast to other receptor tyrosine kinases the C-terminal domain of RYK is devoid of detectable kinase activity.

== Function ==
RYK is involved in regulation of axon growth during development of the nervous system.
