= FGR (gene) =

Protein-coding gene in humans

Identifiers
- Aliases: FGR, SRC2, c-fgr, c-src2, p55-Fgr, p55c-fgr, p58-Fgr, p58c-fgr, FGR proto-oncogene, Src family tyrosine kinase
- External IDs: OMIM: 164940; MGI: 95527; GeneCards: FGR
Enzyme activity
EC #	BRENDA	ExPASy	KEGG	MetaCyc
2.7.10.2	↗	↗	↗	↗

Gene location (Human)
Chr.	Chromosome 1 (human)
Band	1p35.3	Start	27,612,064 bp
Band	1p35.3	End	27,635,185 bp

Gene location (Mouse)
Chr.	Chromosome 4 (mouse)
Band	4 D2.3|4 66.11 cM	Start	132,701,406 bp
Band	4 D2.3|4 66.11 cM	End	132,729,221 bp
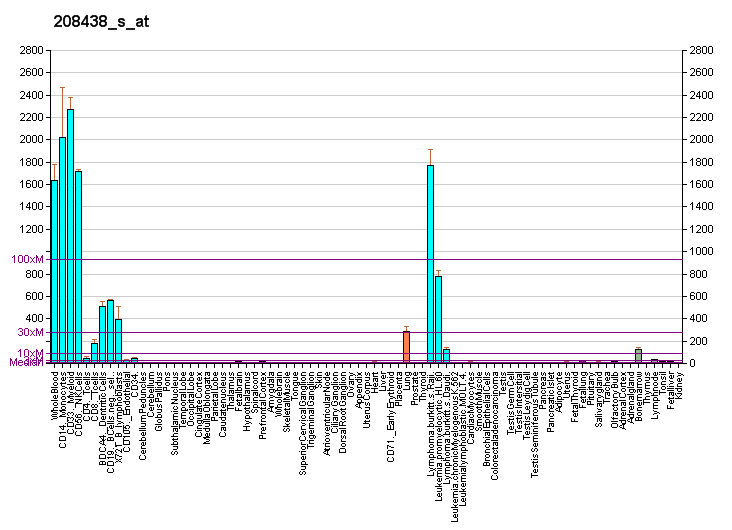
RNA expression pattern
Bgee	Human / Mouse (ortholog); Top expressed in: granulocyte; monocyte; blood; right lung; spleen; upper lobe of left lung; bone marrow cell; trabecular bone; appendix; lower lobe of lung / Top expressed in: granulocyte; tibiofemoral joint; blood; spleen; bone marrow; mesenteric lymph nodes; lumbar subsegment of spinal cord; oocyte; secondary oocyte; embryo; More reference expression data
BioGPS	More reference expression data
Gene ontology
Molecular function	transferase activity; nucleotide binding; protein kinase activity; immunoglobulin receptor binding; kinase activity; protein binding; Fc-gamma receptor I complex binding; ATP binding; protein kinase binding; protein tyrosine kinase activity; non-membrane spanning protein tyrosine kinase activity; phosphotyrosine residue binding; signaling receptor binding
Cellular component	cytoplasm; cytosol; cell projection; membrane; extrinsic component of cytoplasmic side of plasma membrane; mitochondrial intermembrane space; ruffle membrane; mitochondrion; actin cytoskeleton; mitochondrial inner membrane; extracellular exosome; cytoskeleton; extracellular region; plasma membrane; aggresome; secretory granule lumen
Biological process	cell differentiation; regulation of innate immune response; Fc-gamma receptor signaling pathway involved in phagocytosis; phosphorylation; transmembrane receptor protein tyrosine kinase signaling pathway; immune system process; positive regulation of cell migration; response to virus; positive regulation of mast cell degranulation; immune response-regulating cell surface receptor signaling pathway; positive regulation of phosphatidylinositol 3-kinase activity; protein phosphorylation; regulation of cell population proliferation; regulation of cell shape; peptidyl-tyrosine autophosphorylation; integrin-mediated signaling pathway; protein autophosphorylation; positive regulation of phosphatidylinositol 3-kinase signaling; peptidyl-tyrosine phosphorylation; regulation of protein kinase activity; regulation of phagocytosis; defense response to Gram-positive bacterium; cell migration; innate immune response; neutrophil degranulation; bone mineralization; skeletal system morphogenesis
Sources:Amigo / QuickGO
Orthologs
Databases	NCBI: entry; OMA: entry
Species	Human	Mouse
Entrez	2268	14191
Ensembl	ENSG00000000938	ENSMUSG00000028874
UniProt	P09769	P14234
RefSeq (mRNA)	NM_001042729; NM_001042747; NM_005248	NM_010208
RefSeq (protein)	NP_001036194; NP_001036212; NP_005239	NP_034338
Location (UCSC)	Chr 1: 27.61 – 27.64 Mb	Chr 4: 132.7 – 132.73 Mb
PubMed search
- Wikidata
View/Edit Human	View/Edit Mouse

Gardner-Rasheed feline sarcoma viral (v-fgr) oncogene homolog, also known as FGR, is a protein which in humans is encoded by the FGR gene.

== Function ==
This gene is a member of the Src family of protein tyrosine kinases (PTKs). The encoded protein contains N-terminal sites for myristoylation and palmitoylation, a PTK domain, and SH2 and SH3 domains which are involved in mediating protein-protein interactions with phosphotyrosine-containing and proline-rich motifs, respectively. The protein localizes to plasma membrane ruffles, and functions as a negative regulator of cell migration and adhesion triggered by the beta-2 integrin signal transduction pathway. Infection with Epstein–Barr virus results in the overexpression of this gene. Multiple alternatively spliced variants, encoding the same protein, have been identified.

== Discovery ==
The feline version of this gene was discovered by Suraiya Rasheed, Murray Gardner, and co-workers.

== Interactions ==
FGR (gene) has been shown to interact with Wiskott–Aldrich syndrome protein.
