= Receptor tyrosine kinase =

Class of enzymes

receptor protein-tyrosine kinase
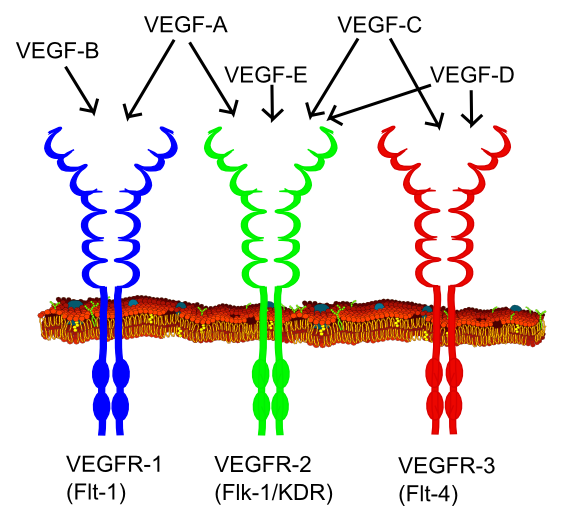

Identifiers
- EC no.: 2.7.10.1

Databases
- BRENDA: enzyme data
- ExPASy: NiceZyme view
- KEGG: enzyme entry
- MetaCyc: metabolic pathway
- Rhea: reactions
- PDB structures: RCSB PDB PDBe PDBsum
- Gene Ontology: AmiGO / QuickGO
Search
- PMC: articles
- PubMed: articles
- NCBI: proteins

Identifiers
- Symbol: Pkinase_Tyr
- Pfam: PF07714
- OPM superfamily: 186
- OPM protein: 2k1k
- Membranome: 3
Available protein structures:
- PDB: PF07714 (ECOD; PDBsum)
- AlphaFold: PF07714

Receptor tyrosine kinases (RTKs) are the high-affinity cell surface receptors for many polypeptide growth factors, cytokines, and hormones. Of the 90 unique tyrosine kinase genes identified in the human genome, 58 encode receptor tyrosine kinase proteins. Receptor tyrosine kinases have been shown not only to be key regulators of normal cellular processes but also to have a critical role in the development and progression of many types of cancer. Mutations in receptor tyrosine kinases lead to activation of a series of signalling cascades which have numerous effects on protein expression. The receptors are generally activated by dimerization and substrate presentation. Receptor tyrosine kinases are part of the larger family of protein tyrosine kinases, encompassing the receptor tyrosine kinase proteins which contain a transmembrane domain, as well as the non-receptor tyrosine kinases which do not possess transmembrane domains.

== History ==
The first RTKs to be discovered were the EGF and NGF receptors in the 1960s, but the classification of receptor tyrosine kinases was not developed until the 1970s.

== Structure ==
Most RTKs are single subunit receptors but some exist as multimeric complexes, e.g., the insulin receptor that forms disulfide linked dimers in the presence of hormone (insulin); moreover, ligand binding to the extracellular domain induces formation of receptor dimers. Each monomer has a single hydrophobic transmembrane-spanning domain composed of 25 to 38 amino acids, an extracellular N terminal region, and an intracellular C terminal region. The extracellular N terminal region exhibits a variety of conserved elements including immunoglobulin (Ig)-like or epidermal growth factor (EGF)-like domains, fibronectin type III repeats, or cysteine-rich regions that are characteristic for each subfamily of RTKs; these domains contain primarily a ligand-binding site, which binds extracellular ligands, e.g., a particular growth factor or hormone. The intracellular C terminal region displays the highest level of conservation and comprises catalytic domains responsible for the kinase activity of these receptors, which catalyses receptor autophosphorylation and tyrosine phosphorylation of RTK substrates.

== Kinase activity ==
A kinase is a type of enzyme that transfers phosphate groups (see below) from high-energy donor molecules, such as ATP (see below) to specific target molecules (substrates); the process is termed phosphorylation. The opposite, an enzyme that removes phosphate groups from targets, is known as a phosphatase. Kinase enzymes that specifically phosphorylate tyrosine amino acids are termed tyrosine kinases.

Phosphate

ATP

Tyrosine

Phosphotyrosine

When a growth factor binds to the extracellular domain of an RTK, its dimerization is triggered with other adjacent RTKs. Dimerization leads to a rapid activation of the protein's cytoplasmic kinase domains, the first substrate for these domains being the receptor itself. The activated receptor, as a result, then becomes autophosphorylated on multiple specific intracellular tyrosine residues.

== Signal transduction ==
Through diverse means, extracellular ligand binding will typically cause or stabilize receptor dimerization. This allows a tyrosine in the cytoplasmic portion of each receptor monomer to be trans-phosphorylated by its partner receptor, propagating a signal through the plasma membrane. The phosphorylation of specific tyrosine residues within the activated receptor creates binding sites for Src homology 2 (SH2) domain- and phosphotyrosine binding (PTB) domain-containing proteins. Specific proteins containing these domains include Src and phospholipase Cγ. Phosphorylation and activation of these two proteins on receptor binding lead to the initiation of signal transduction pathways. Other proteins that interact with the activated receptor act as adaptor proteins and have no intrinsic enzymatic activity of their own. These adaptor proteins link RTK activation to downstream signal transduction pathways, such as the MAP kinase signalling cascade. An example of a vital signal transduction pathway involves the tyrosine kinase receptor, c-met, which is required for the survival and proliferation of migrating myoblasts during myogenesis. A lack of c-met disrupts secondary myogenesis and—as in LBX1—prevents the formation of limb musculature. This local action of FGFs (Fibroblast Growth Factors) with their RTK receptors is classified as paracrine signalling. As RTK receptors phosphorylate multiple tyrosine residues, they can activate multiple signal transduction pathways.

== Classes ==
Currently, 20 different classes of receptor tyrosine kinases have been identified:

Type I RTKs:	ErbB receptors
Type II RTKs:	Insulin receptors
Type III RTKs:	Platelet-derived growth factor receptors, CSF1R, FLT3, KIT
Type IV RTKs:	Vascular endothelial growth factor receptors
Type V RTKs:	Fibroblast growth factor receptors
Type VI RTKs:	PTK7 family
Type VII RTKs:	Tropomyosin receptor kinases
Type VIII RTKs:	ROR receptors
Type IX RTKs:	Muscle-associated receptor kinase family
Type X RTKs:	MET proto-oncogene family
Type XI RTKs:	TAM receptors
Type XII RTKs:	TIE receptor family
Type XIII RTKs:	Eph receptors
Type XIV RTKs:	RET proto-oncogene family
Type XV RTKs:	Related to receptor tyrosine kinase family
Type XVI RTKs:	Discoidin domain receptors
Type XVII RTKs:	ROS proto-oncogene 1 family
Type XVIII RTKs:	Lemur tail kinase family
Type XIX RTKs:	ALK family receptors
Type XX RTKs:	STYK1 family

== Families ==
=== Epidermal growth factor receptor family ===
The ErbB protein family or epidermal growth factor receptor (EGFR) family is a family of four structurally related receptor tyrosine kinases. Insufficient ErbB signaling in humans is associated with the development of neurodegenerative diseases, such as multiple sclerosis and Alzheimer's disease. In mice, loss of signaling by any member of the ErbB family results in embryonic lethality with defects in organs including the lungs, skin, heart, and brain. Excessive ErbB signaling is associated with the development of a wide variety of types of solid tumor. ErbB-1 and ErbB-2 are found in many human cancers and their excessive signaling may be critical factors in the development and malignancy of these tumors.

=== Fibroblast growth factor receptor (FGFR) family ===
Fibroblast growth factors comprise the largest family of growth factor ligands at 23 members. The natural alternate splicing of four fibroblast growth factor receptor (FGFR) genes results in the production of over 48 different isoforms of FGFR. These isoforms vary in their ligand binding properties and kinase domains; however, all share a common extracellular region composed of three immunoglobulin (Ig)-like domains (D1-D3), and thus belong to the immunoglobulin superfamily. Interactions with FGFs occur via FGFR domains D2 and D3. Each receptor can be activated by several FGFs. In many cases, the FGFs themselves can also activate more than one receptor. This is not the case with FGF-7, however, which can activate only FGFR2b. A gene for a fifth FGFR protein, FGFR5, has also been identified. In contrast to FGFRs 1-4, it lacks a cytoplasmic tyrosine kinase domain, and one isoform, FGFR5γ, only contains the extracellular domains D1 and D2.

=== Vascular endothelial growth factor receptor (VEGFR) family ===
Vascular endothelial growth factor (VEGF) is one of the main inducers of endothelial cell proliferation and permeability of blood vessels. Two RTKs bind to VEGF at the cell surface, VEGFR-1 (Flt-1) and VEGFR-2 (KDR/Flk-1).

The VEGF receptors have an extracellular portion consisting of seven Ig-like domains so, like FGFRs, belong to the immunoglobulin superfamily. They also possess a single transmembrane spanning region and an intracellular portion containing a split tyrosine-kinase domain. VEGF-A binds to VEGFR-1 (Flt-1) and VEGFR-2 (KDR/Flk-1). VEGFR-2 appears to mediate almost all of the known cellular responses to VEGF. The function of VEGFR-1 is less well defined, although it is thought to modulate VEGFR-2 signaling. Another function of VEGFR-1 may be to act as a dummy/decoy receptor, sequestering VEGF from VEGFR-2 binding (this appears to be particularly important during vasculogenesis in the embryo). A third receptor has been discovered (VEGFR-3); however, VEGF-A is not a ligand for this receptor. VEGFR-3 mediates lymphangiogenesis in response to VEGF-C and VEGF-D.

=== RET receptor family ===
The natural alternate splicing of the RET gene results in the production of 3 different isoforms of the protein RET. RET51, RET43, and RET9 contain 51, 43, and 9 amino acids in their C-terminal tail, respectively. The biological roles of isoforms RET51 and RET9 are the most well studied in vivo, as these are the most common isoforms in which RET occurs.

RET is the receptor for members of the glial cell line-derived neurotrophic factor (GDNF) family of extracellular signalling molecules or ligands (GFLs).

In order to activate RET, first GFLs must form a complex with a glycosylphosphatidylinositol (GPI)-anchored co-receptor. The co-receptors themselves are classified as members of the GDNF receptor-α (GFRα) protein family. Different members of the GFRα family (GFRα1-GFRα4) exhibit a specific binding activity for a specific GFLs. Upon GFL-GFRα complex formation, the complex then brings together two molecules of RET, triggering trans-autophosphorylation of specific tyrosine residues within the tyrosine kinase domain of each RET molecule. Phosphorylation of these tyrosines then initiates intracellular signal transduction processes.

=== Eph receptor family ===
Ephrin receptors are the largest subfamily of RTKs.

=== Discoidin domain receptor (DDR) family ===
The DDRs are unique RTKs in that they bind to collagens rather than soluble growth factors.

== Regulation ==
The receptor tyrosine kinase (RTK) pathway is carefully regulated by a variety of positive and negative feedback loops. Because RTKs coordinate a wide variety of cellular functions such as cell proliferation and differentiation, they must be regulated to prevent severe abnormalities in cellular functioning such as cancer and fibrosis.

=== Protein tyrosine phosphatases ===
Protein Tyrosine Phosphatase (PTPs) are a group of enzymes that possess a catalytic domain with phosphotyrosine-specific phosphohydrolase activity. PTPs are capable of modifying the activity of receptor tyrosine kinases in both a positive and negative manner. PTPs can dephosphorylate the activated phosphorylated tyrosine residues on the RTKs which virtually leads to termination of the signal. Studies involving PTP1B, a widely known PTP involved in the regulation of the cell cycle and cytokine receptor signaling, has shown to dephosphorylate the epidermal growth factor receptor and the insulin receptor. Some PTPs, on the other hand, are cell surface receptors that play a positive role in cell signaling proliferation. Cd45, a cell surface glycoprotein, plays a critical role in antigen-stimulated dephosphorylation of specific phosphotyrosines that inhibit the Src pathway.

=== Herstatin ===
Herstatin is an autoinhibitor of the ErbB family, which binds to RTKs and blocks receptor dimerization and tyrosine phosphorylation. CHO cells transfected with herstatin resulted in reduced receptor oligomerization, clonal growth and receptor tyrosine phosphorylation in response to EGF.

=== Receptor endocytosis ===
Activated RTKs can undergo endocytosis resulting in down regulation of the receptor and eventually the signaling cascade. The molecular mechanism involves the engulfing of the RTK by a clathrin-mediated endocytosis, leading to intracellular degradation.

== Drug therapy ==
RTKs have become an attractive target for drug therapy due to their implication in a variety of cellular abnormalities such as cancer, degenerative diseases and cardiovascular diseases. The United States Food and Drug Administration (FDA) has approved several anti-cancer drugs caused by activated RTKs. Drugs have been developed to target the extracellular domain or the catalytic domain, thus inhibiting ligand binding, receptor oligomerization. Herceptin, a monoclonal antibody that is capable of binding to the extracellular domain of RTKs, has been used to treat HER2 overexpression in breast cancer.

Small molecule inhibitors and monoclonal antibodies (approved by the US Food and Drug Administration) against RTKs for cancer therapy
Small Molecule	Target	Disease	Approval Year
Imatinib (Gleevec)	PDGFR, KIT, Abl, Arg	CML, GIST	2001
Gefitinib (Iressa)	EGFR	Esophageal cancer, Glioma	2003
Erlotinib (Tarceva)	EGFR	Esophageal cancer, Glioma	2004
Sorafenib (Nexavar)	Raf, VEGFR, PDGFR, Flt3, KIT	Renal cell carcinoma	2005
Sunitinib (Sutent)	KIT, VEGFR, PDGFR, Flt3	Renal cell carcinoma, GIST, Endocrine pancreatic cancer	2006
Dasatinib (Sprycel)	Abl, Arg, KIT, PDGFR, Src	Imatinib-resistant CML	2007
Nilotinib (Tasigna)	Abl, Arg, KIT, PDGFR	Imatinib-resistant CML	2007
Lapatinib (Tykerb)	EGFR, ErbB2	Mammary carcinoma	2007
Trastuzumab (Herceptin)	ErbB2	Mammary carcinoma	1998
Cetuximab (Erbitux)	EGFR	Colorectal cancer, Head and neck cancer	2004
Bevacizumab (Avastin)	VEGF	Lung cancer, Colorectal cancer	2004
Panitumumab (Vectibix)	EGFR	Colorectal cancer	2006

+ Table adapted from "Cell signalling by receptor-tyrosine kinases," by Lemmon and Schlessinger's, 2010. Cell, 141, p. 1117–1134.

== See also ==
- Tyrosine kinase
- Insulin receptor
- Enzyme-linked receptor
- Tyrphostins
- Bcr-Abl tyrosine kinase inhibitors
