= FER (gene) =

Protein-coding gene in the species Homo sapiens

Identifiers
- Aliases: FER, FerT, PPP1R74, Pe1Fe10, Pe1Fe13, Pe1Fe3, Pe1Fe6, TYK3, p94-Fer, FER tyrosine kinase
- External IDs: OMIM: 176942; MGI: 105917; GeneCards: FER
Available structures
PDB	Ortholog search: PDBe RCSB
PDB	List of PDB id codes 2KK6
Enzyme activity
EC #	BRENDA	ExPASy	KEGG	MetaCyc
2.7.10.2	↗	↗	↗	↗

Gene location (Human)
Chr.	Chromosome 5 (human)
Band	5q21.3	Start	108,747,841 bp
Band	5q21.3	End	109,196,841 bp

Gene location (Mouse)
Chr.	Chromosome 17 (mouse)
Band	17|17 E1.1	Start	64,170,057 bp
Band	17|17 E1.1	End	64,446,491 bp
RNA expression pattern
Bgee	Human / Mouse (ortholog); Top expressed in: Achilles tendon; secondary oocyte; buccal mucosa cell; sural nerve; sperm; tendon of biceps brachii; corpus callosum; epithelium of colon; internal globus pallidus; testicle / Top expressed in: spermatid; otic placode; spermatocyte; saccule; primary oocyte; secondary oocyte; esophagus; tail of embryo; zygote; genital tubercle; More reference expression data
BioGPS	n/a
Gene ontology
Molecular function	transferase activity; nucleotide binding; protein kinase activity; epidermal growth factor receptor binding; non-membrane spanning protein tyrosine kinase activity; kinase activity; protein phosphatase 1 binding; protein binding; protein tyrosine kinase activity; ATP binding; lipid binding
Cellular component	cytoplasm; cell projection; membrane; microtubule cytoskeleton; extrinsic component of cytoplasmic side of plasma membrane; plasma membrane; cell junction; cell cortex; actin cytoskeleton; cytoskeleton; nucleus; lamellipodium; cytosol
Biological process	regulation of protein phosphorylation; regulation of lamellipodium assembly; actin cytoskeleton reorganization; diapedesis; cell differentiation; intracellular signal transduction; positive regulation of actin filament polymerization; extracellular matrix-cell signaling; phosphorylation; cytokine-mediated signaling pathway; Kit signaling pathway; positive regulation of cell migration; regulation of epidermal growth factor receptor signaling pathway; response to platelet-derived growth factor; cellular response to macrophage colony-stimulating factor stimulus; cell-cell adhesion mediated by cadherin; cellular response to reactive oxygen species; chemotaxis; protein phosphorylation; Fc-epsilon receptor signaling pathway; interleukin-6-mediated signaling pathway; response to lipopolysaccharide; cell adhesion; positive regulation of NF-kappaB transcription factor activity; positive regulation of cell population proliferation; insulin receptor signaling pathway via phosphatidylinositol 3-kinase; cellular response to insulin stimulus; mitotic cell cycle; peptidyl-tyrosine autophosphorylation; negative regulation of mast cell activation involved in immune response; protein autophosphorylation; peptidyl-tyrosine phosphorylation; substrate adhesion-dependent cell spreading; regulation of mast cell degranulation; platelet-derived growth factor receptor signaling pathway; cell population proliferation; regulation of fibroblast migration; innate immune response; microtubule cytoskeleton organization; signal transduction; tyrosine phosphorylation of STAT protein; regulation of cell population proliferation
Sources:Amigo / QuickGO
Orthologs
Databases	NCBI: entry; OMA: entry
Species	Human	Mouse
Entrez	2241	14158
Ensembl	ENSG00000151422	ENSMUSG00000000127
UniProt	P16591	P70451
RefSeq (mRNA)	NM_001308028; NM_001308031; NM_001308038; NM_005246	NM_001037997; NM_001286415; NM_008000
RefSeq (protein)	NP_001294957; NP_001294960; NP_001294967; NP_005237	NP_001033086; NP_001273344; NP_032026
Location (UCSC)	Chr 5: 108.75 – 109.2 Mb	Chr 17: 64.17 – 64.45 Mb
PubMed search
- Wikidata
View/Edit Human	View/Edit Mouse

Proto-oncogene tyrosine-protein kinase FER is an enzyme that in humans is encoded by the FER gene.

Fer protein is a member of the FPS/FES family of nontransmembrane receptor tyrosine kinases. It regulates cell-cell adhesion and mediates signaling from the cell surface to the cytoskeleton via growth factor receptors.

== Interactions ==
FER (gene) has been shown to interact with TMF1 and Cortactin.
