= STYK1 =

Protein-coding gene in the species Homo sapiens

Identifiers
- Aliases: STYK1, NOK, SuRTK106, serine/threonine/tyrosine kinase 1
- External IDs: OMIM: 611433; MGI: 2141396; GeneCards: STYK1
Enzyme activity
EC #	BRENDA	ExPASy	KEGG	MetaCyc
2.7.10.2	↗	↗	↗	↗

Gene location (Human)
Chr.	Chromosome 12 (human)
Band	12p13.2	Start	10,618,923 bp
Band	12p13.2	End	10,674,318 bp

Gene location (Mouse)
Chr.	Chromosome 6 (mouse)
Band	6|6 F3	Start	131,276,105 bp
Band	6|6 F3	End	131,330,560 bp
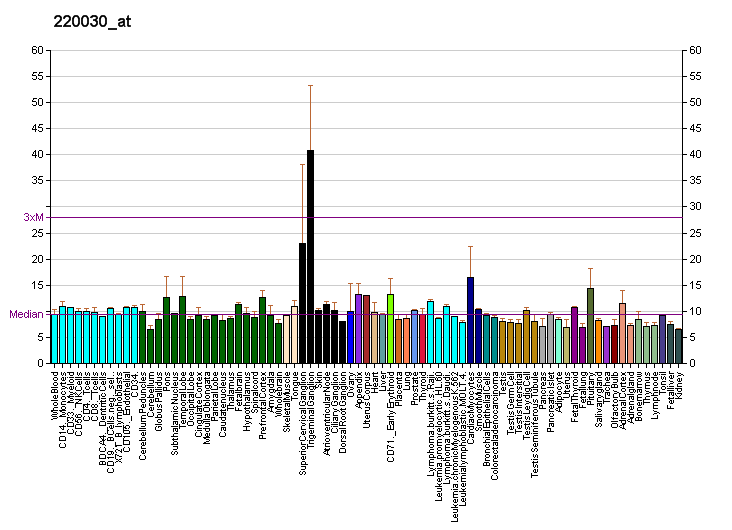

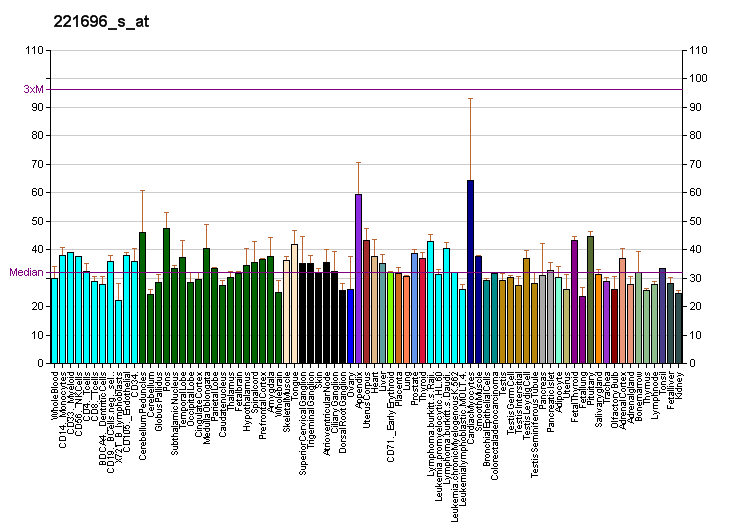
RNA expression pattern
Bgee	Human / Mouse (ortholog); Top expressed in: endothelial cell; amniotic fluid; pancreatic ductal cell; rectum; middle temporal gyrus; Brodmann area 23; mucosa of colon; mucosa of transverse colon; mucosa of sigmoid colon; palpebral conjunctiva / Top expressed in: zygote; jejunum; left colon; secondary oocyte; primary oocyte; duodenum; Paneth cell; ileum; granulocyte; epithelium of stomach; More reference expression data
BioGPS	More reference expression data
Gene ontology
Molecular function	transferase activity; nucleotide binding; protein kinase activity; protein tyrosine kinase activity; signaling receptor binding; non-membrane spanning protein tyrosine kinase activity; protein binding; ATP binding; kinase activity
Cellular component	integral component of membrane; extrinsic component of cytoplasmic side of plasma membrane; plasma membrane; membrane
Biological process	peptidyl-tyrosine autophosphorylation; cell differentiation; protein phosphorylation; innate immune response; cell migration; regulation of cell population proliferation; phosphorylation; chemotaxis; cell adhesion; epidermal growth factor receptor signaling pathway; regulation of mast cell degranulation; peptidyl-tyrosine phosphorylation
Sources:Amigo / QuickGO
Orthologs
Databases	NCBI: entry; OMA: entry
Species	Human	Mouse
Entrez	55359	243659
Ensembl	ENSG00000060140	ENSMUSG00000032899
UniProt	Q6J9G0	Q6J9G1
RefSeq (mRNA)	NM_018423	NM_172891
RefSeq (protein)	NP_060893	NP_766479
Location (UCSC)	Chr 12: 10.62 – 10.67 Mb	Chr 6: 131.28 – 131.33 Mb
PubMed search
- Wikidata
View/Edit Human	View/Edit Mouse

Tyrosine-protein kinase STYK1 is an enzyme that in humans is encoded by the STYK1 gene.
