= Fyn-related kinase =

Protein found in humans

FRK

Identifiers
- Aliases: FRK, GTK, PTK5, RAK, Fyn-related kinase, fyn related Src family tyrosine kinase
- External IDs: OMIM: 606573; MGI: 103265; GeneCards: FRK
Available structures
PDB	Ortholog search: PDBe RCSB
PDB	List of PDB id codes 2D8J, 2DLY
Enzyme activity
EC #	BRENDA	ExPASy	KEGG	MetaCyc
2.7.10.2	↗	↗	↗	↗

Gene location (Human)
Chr.	Chromosome 6 (human)
Band	6q22.1	Start	115,931,149 bp
Band	6q22.1	End	116,060,891 bp

Gene location (Mouse)
Chr.	Chromosome 10 (mouse)
Band	10|10 B1	Start	34,359,395 bp
Band	10|10 B1	End	34,487,274 bp
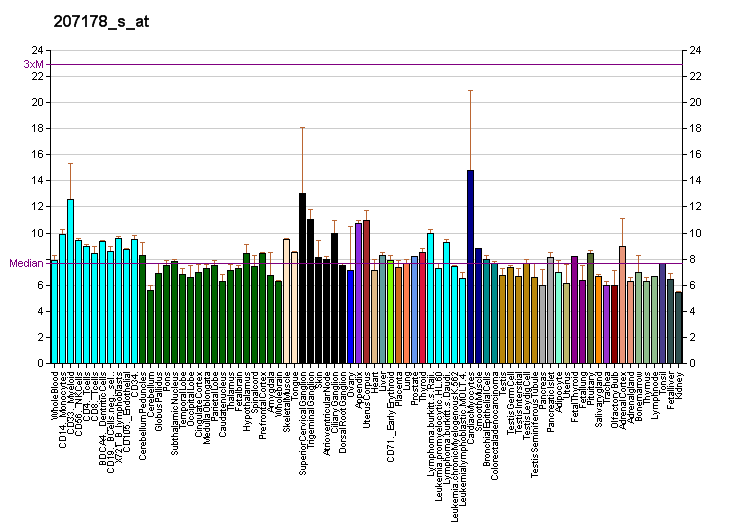
RNA expression pattern
Bgee	Human / Mouse (ortholog); Top expressed in: jejunal mucosa; mucosa of sigmoid colon; epithelium of nasopharynx; mucosa of paranasal sinus; bronchial epithelial cell; buccal mucosa cell; palpebral conjunctiva; parotid gland; sperm; corpus epididymis / Top expressed in: seminal vesicula; jejunum; duodenum; renal pelvis; conjunctival fornix; large intestine; colon; inner renal medulla; left colon; Paneth cell; More reference expression data
BioGPS	More reference expression data
Gene ontology
Molecular function	transferase activity; nucleotide binding; protein kinase activity; kinase activity; protein binding; signaling receptor binding; ATP binding; non-membrane spanning protein tyrosine kinase activity; protein tyrosine kinase activity
Cellular component	extrinsic component of cytoplasmic side of plasma membrane; plasma membrane; intracellular anatomical structure; extracellular exosome; extracellular region; nucleus; nucleoplasm; cytoplasm; azurophil granule lumen; specific granule lumen; cytosol
Biological process	cell differentiation; phosphorylation; transmembrane receptor protein tyrosine kinase signaling pathway; negative regulation of transcription by RNA polymerase II; protein phosphorylation; peptidyl-tyrosine autophosphorylation; innate immune response; negative regulation of cell population proliferation; neutrophil degranulation; cell migration
Sources:Amigo / QuickGO
Orthologs
Databases	NCBI: entry; OMA: entry
Species	Human	Mouse
Entrez	2444	14302
Ensembl	ENSG00000111816	ENSMUSG00000019779
UniProt	P42685	Q922K9
RefSeq (mRNA)	NM_002031	NM_001159544; NM_010237; NM_001358769
RefSeq (protein)	NP_002022	NP_001153016; NP_034367; NP_001345698
Location (UCSC)	Chr 6: 115.93 – 116.06 Mb	Chr 10: 34.36 – 34.49 Mb
PubMed search
- Wikidata
View/Edit Human	View/Edit Mouse

Fyn-related kinase (FRK, formerly tyrosine protein kinase 5) is an enzyme that in humans is encoded by the FRK gene.

The protein encoded by this gene belongs to the TYR family of protein kinases. This tyrosine kinase is a nuclear protein and may function during G1 and S phase of the cell cycle and suppress growth.

== Interactions ==
FRK has been shown to interact with retinoblastoma protein.
