= TXK (gene) =

Protein-coding gene in humans

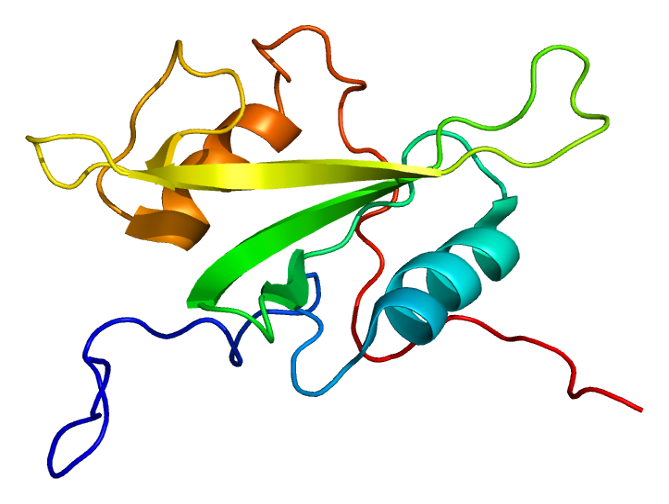

Identifiers
- Aliases: TXK, BTKL, PSCTK5, PTK4, RLK, TKL, TXK tyrosine kinase
- External IDs: OMIM: 600058; MGI: 102960; GeneCards: TXK
Available structures
PDB	Ortholog search: PDBe RCSB
PDB	List of PDB id codes 2DM0
Enzyme activity
EC #	BRENDA	ExPASy	KEGG	MetaCyc
2.7.10.2	↗	↗	↗	↗

Gene location (Human)
Chr.	Chromosome 4 (human)
Band	4p12	Start	48,066,393 bp
Band	4p12	End	48,134,250 bp

Gene location (Mouse)
Chr.	Chromosome 5 (mouse)
Band	5 C3.2|5 38.44 cM	Start	72,853,321 bp
Band	5 C3.2|5 38.44 cM	End	72,910,120 bp
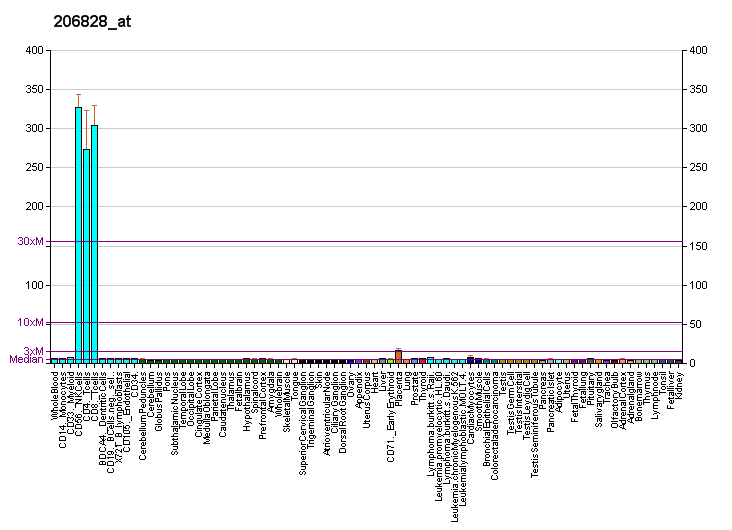
RNA expression pattern
Bgee	Human / Mouse (ortholog); Top expressed in: granulocyte; blood; testicle; spleen; lymph node; appendix; right uterine tube; bone marrow cell; right lobe of liver; upper lobe of left lung / Top expressed in: thymus; blood; lymph node; morula; pharynx; mesenteric lymph nodes; spleen; subcutaneous adipose tissue; granulocyte; ileum; More reference expression data
BioGPS	More reference expression data
Gene ontology
Molecular function	transferase activity; nucleotide binding; DNA binding; protein kinase activity; DNA-binding transcription activator activity, RNA polymerase II-specific; kinase activity; RNA polymerase II cis-regulatory region sequence-specific DNA binding; protein binding; protein tyrosine kinase activity; signaling receptor binding; ATP binding; non-membrane spanning protein tyrosine kinase activity
Cellular component	cytoplasm; membrane; extrinsic component of cytoplasmic side of plasma membrane; plasma membrane; nucleus
Biological process	cell differentiation; regulation of transcription, DNA-templated; adaptive immune response; phosphorylation; tissue regeneration; transmembrane receptor protein tyrosine kinase signaling pathway; immune system process; regulation of transcription by RNA polymerase II; cytokine production; positive regulation of interferon-gamma-mediated signaling pathway; positive regulation of interferon-gamma production; activation of phospholipase C activity; transcription, DNA-templated; protein phosphorylation; regulation of cell population proliferation; peptidyl-tyrosine autophosphorylation; integrin-mediated signaling pathway; protein autophosphorylation; regulation of platelet activation; T cell receptor signaling pathway; positive regulation of transcription by RNA polymerase II; transcription by RNA polymerase II
Sources:Amigo / QuickGO
Orthologs
Databases	NCBI: entry; OMA: entry
Species	Human	Mouse
Entrez	7294	22165
Ensembl	ENSG00000074966	ENSMUSG00000054892
UniProt	P42681	P42682
RefSeq (mRNA)	NM_003328	NM_001122754; NM_001289494; NM_001289495; NM_013698
RefSeq (protein)	NP_003319	NP_001116226; NP_001276423; NP_001276424; NP_038726
Location (UCSC)	Chr 4: 48.07 – 48.13 Mb	Chr 5: 72.85 – 72.91 Mb
PubMed search
- Wikidata
View/Edit Human	View/Edit Mouse

Tyrosine-protein kinase TXK is an enzyme that in humans is encoded by the TXK gene. This enzyme functions as a (non-specific) tyrosine protein kinase.
