= B-cell receptor =

Transmembrane protein on the surface of a B cell

The B-cell receptor (BCR) is a transmembrane protein on the surface of a B cell. A B-cell receptor includes both CD79 and the immunoglobulin. The plasma membrane of a B cell is indicated by the green phospholipids. The B- cell receptor extends both outside the cell (above the plasma membrane) and inside the cell (below the membrane).

The B-cell receptor (BCR) is a transmembrane protein on the surface of a B cell. A B-cell receptor is composed of a membrane-bound immunoglobulin molecule and a signal transduction moiety. The former forms a type 1 transmembrane receptor protein, and is typically located on the outer surface of these lymphocyte cells. Through biochemical signaling and by physically acquiring antigens from the immune synapses, the BCR controls the activation of the B cell.

The receptor's binding moiety is composed of a membrane-bound antibody that, like all antibodies, has two identical paratopes that are unique and randomly determined. The BCR for an antigen is a significant sensor that is required for B cell activation, survival, and development. A B cell is activated by its first encounter with an antigen (its "cognate antigen") that binds to its receptor, resulting in cell proliferation and differentiation to generate a population of antibody-secreting plasma B cells and memory B cells. The B cell receptor (BCR) has two crucial functions upon interaction with the antigen. One function is signal transduction, involving changes in receptor oligomerization. The second function is to mediate internalization for subsequent processing of the antigen and presentation of peptides to helper T cells.

== Development and structure of the B cell receptor ==
The first checkpoint in the development of a B cell is the production of a functional pre-BCR, which is composed of two surrogate light chains (each one being a heterodimer of IGLL1 + VPREB1) and two immunoglobulin heavy chains, which are normally linked to Ig-α (or CD79A) and Ig-β (or CD79B) signaling molecules. Each B cell, produced in the bone marrow, is highly specific to an antigen. The BCR can be found in a number of identical copies of membrane proteins that are exposed at the cell surface.

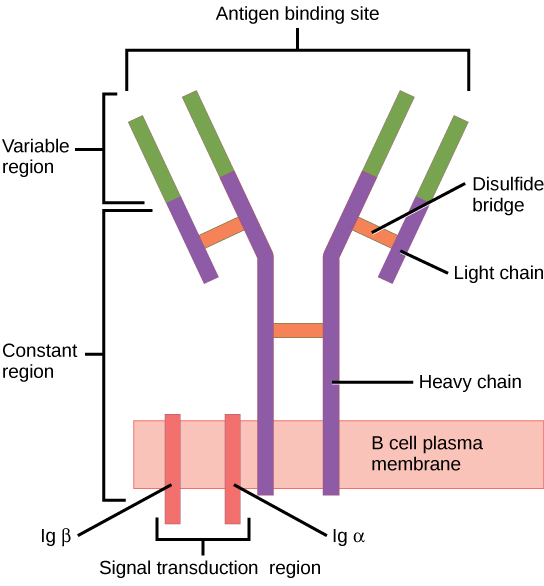
The general structure of the B cell receptor includes a membrane-bound immunoglobulin molecule and a signal transduction region. Disulfide bridges connect the immunoglobulin isotype and the signal transduction region.

The mature B-cell receptor is composed of two parts:

1. A membrane-bound immunoglobulin molecule of one isotype (IgD, IgM, IgA, IgG, or IgE). With the exception of the presence of a transmembrane alpha-helix, these are identical to their secreted forms.
2. Signal transduction moiety: a heterodimer called Ig-α/Ig-β (CD79), bound together by disulfide bridges. Each member of the dimer spans the plasma membrane and has a cytoplasmic tail bearing an immunoreceptor tyrosine-based activation motif (ITAM).

More analytically, the BCR complex consists of an antigen-binding subunit known as the membrane immunoglobulin (mIg), which is composed of two immunoglobulin light chains (IgLs) and two immunoglobulin heavy chains (IgHs) as well as two heterodimer subunits of Ig-α and Ig-β. In order for membrane mIgM molecules to transport to the surface of the cell, there must be a combination of Ig-α and Ig-β with the mIgM molecules. Pre-B cells that do not generate any Ig molecule normally carry both Ig-α and Ig-β to the cell surface.

Heterodimers may exist in the B cells as either an association or combination with another pre B cell-specific proteins or alone, thereby replacing the mIgM molecule. Within the BCR, the part that recognizes antigens is composed of three distinct genetic regions, referred to as V, D, and J. All these regions are recombined and spliced at the genetic level in a combinatorial process that is exceptional to the immune system. There are a number of genes that encode each of these regions in the genome and can be joined in various ways to generate a wide range of receptor molecules. The production of this variety is crucial since the body may encounter many more antigens than the available genes. Through this process, the body finds a way of producing multiple different combinations of antigen-recognizing receptor molecules. Heavy chain rearrangement of the BCR entails the initial steps in the development of B cell. The short J_{H} (joining) and D_{H} (diversity) regions are recombined first in early pro-B cells in a process that is dependent on the enzymes RAG2 and RAG1. After the recombination of the D and J regions, the cell is now referred to as a “late pro-B” cell and the short DJ region can now be recombined with a longer segment of the V_{H} gene.

BCRs have distinctive binding sites that rely on the complementarity of the surface of the epitope and the surface of the receptor, which often occurs by non-covalent forces. Mature B cells can only survive in the peripheral circulation for a limited time when there is no specific antigen. This is because when cells do not meet any antigen within this time, they will go through apoptosis. It is notable that in the peripheral circulation, apoptosis is important in maintaining an optimal circulation of B-lymphocytes. In structure, the BCR for antigens are almost identical to secreted antibodies. However, there is a distinctive structural dissimilarity in the C-terminal area of the heavy chains, as it consists of a hydrophobic stretch that is short, which spreads across the lipid bilayer of the membrane.

== Signaling pathways of the B cell receptor ==
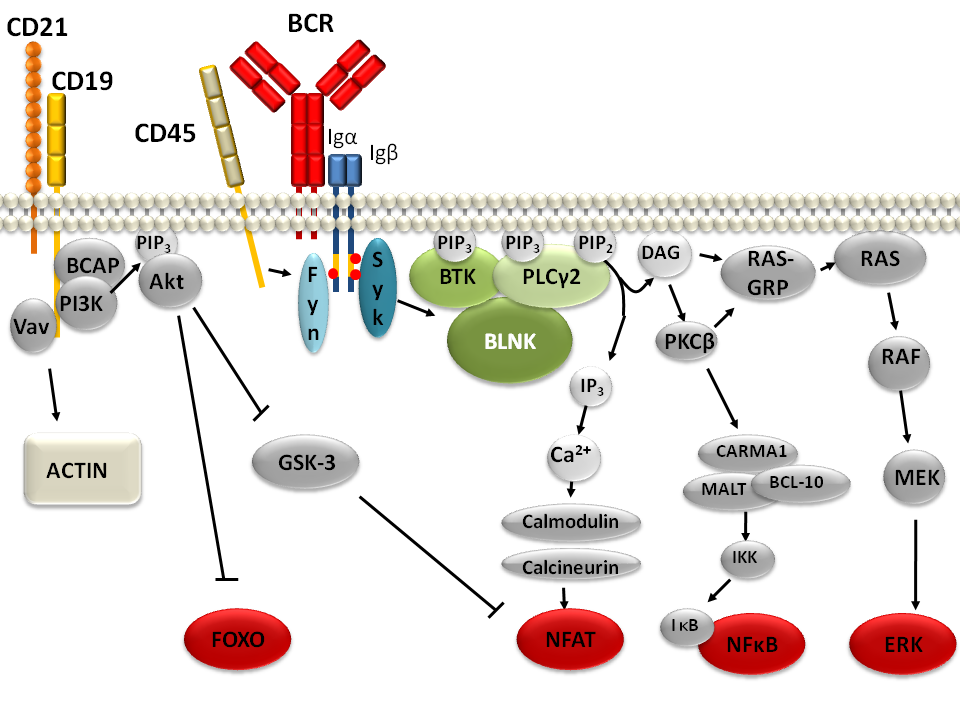
Schematic representation of the B-cell receptor signaling pathways. Aggregation of the BCR quickly activate Src family kinases, including Blk, LYN, and FYN and the SYK and BTK tyrosine kinases. As such, the process catalyzes the formation of a ‘signalosome’ that consists of the aforementioned tyrosine kinases, the BCR and the adaptor proteins, for instance, BLNK and CD19, as well as signaling molecules, such as PI3K, PLCy2, and VAV.

There are several signaling pathways that the B-cell receptor can follow through. The physiology of B cells is intimately connected with the function of their B-cell receptor. The BCR signaling pathway is initiated when the mIg subunits of the BCR bind a specific antigen. The initial triggering of the BCR is similar for all receptors of the non-catalytic tyrosine-phosphorylated receptor family. The binding event allows phosphorylation of immunoreceptor tyrosine-based activation motifs (ITAMs) in the associated Igα/Igβ heterodimer subunits by the tyrosine kinases of the Src family, including Blk, Lyn, and Fyn. Multiple models have been proposed how BCR-antigen binding induces phosphorylation, including conformational change of the receptor and aggregation of multiple receptors upon antigen binding. Tyrosine kinase Syk binds to and is activated by phosphorylated ITAMs and in turn phosphorylates scaffold protein BLNK on multiple sites. After phosphorylation, downstream signalling molecules are recruited to BLNK, which results in their activation and the transduction of the signal to the interior.

1. IKK/NF-κB Transcription Factor Pathway: CD79 and other proteins, microsignalosomes, go to activate PLC-γ after antigen recognition by the BCR and before it goes to associate into the c-SMAC. It then cleaves PIP_{2} into IP3 and DAG (diacylglycerol). IP3 acts as a second messenger to dramatically increase ionic calcium inside the cytosol (via release from the endoplasmic reticulum or influx from the extracellular environment via ion channels). This leads to eventual activation of PKCβ from the calcium and DAG. PKCβ phosphorylates (either directly or indirectly) the NF-κB signaling complex protein CARMA1 (the complex itself comprising CARMA1, BCL10, and MALT1). These result in recruitment and summoning of the IKK (IkB kinase), TAK1, by several ubiquitylation enzymes also associated with the CARMA1/BCL10/MALT1 complex. MALT1 itself is a caspase-like protein that cleaves A20, an inhibitory protein of NF-κB signaling (which acts by deubiquitylating NF-κB's ubiquitylation substrates, having an inhibitory effect). TAK1 phosphorylates the IKK trimer after it too has been recruited to the signaling complex by its associated ubiquitylation enzymes. IKK then phosphorylates IkB (an inhibitor of and bound to NF-κB), which induces its destruction by marking it for proteolytic degradation, freeing cytosolic NF-κB. NF-κB then migrates to the nucleus to bind to DNA at specific response elements, causing recruitment of transcription molecules and beginning the transcription process.
2. Ligand binding to the BCR also leads to the phosphorylation of the protein BCAP. This leads to the binding and activation of several proteins with phosphotyrosine-binding SH2 domains. One of these proteins is PI3K. Activation of PI3K leads to PIP_{2} phosphorylation, forming PIP_{3}. Proteins that have a Pleckstrin homology domain can bind to the newly created PIP_{3}, which activates them. Among such proteins is the FoxO family, which stimulate cell cycle progression, and protein kinase D, which enhances glucose metabolism. Another important protein with a Pleckstrin homology domain is Bam32. Bam32 recruits and activates small GTPases such as Rac1 and Cdc42. These, in turn, are responsible for the cytoskeletal changes associated with BCR activation by modifying actin polymerisation.

== Contributions of mechanical forces to activation ==
B cells are able to gather and grab antigens by engaging biochemical modules for receptor clustering, cell spreading, generation of pulling forces, and receptor transport, which eventually culminates in endocytosis and antigen presentation. B cells' mechanical activity adheres to a pattern of negative and positive feedbacks that regulate the quantity of removed antigen by manipulating the dynamic of BCR–antigen bonds directly. Particularly, grouping and spreading increase the relation of antigen with BCR, thereby proving sensitivity and amplification. On the other hand, pulling forces delink the antigen from the BCR, thus testing the quality of antigen binding.

== The B-cell receptor in malignancy ==
The B-cell receptor has been shown to be involved in the pathogenesis of various B cell derived lymphoid cancers. Although it may be possible that stimulation by antigen binding contributes to the proliferation of malignant B cells, increasing evidence implicates antigen-independent self-association of BCRs as a key feature in a growing number of B cell neoplasias. B cell receptor signalling is currently a therapeutic target in various lymphoid neoplasms. It has been shown that BCR signaling is synchronised with CD40 pathway activation provided by B-T cell interactions, and this seems to be essential to trigger proliferation of leukemic B cells.

B-cell receptor (BCR) repertoire profiling in tumor tissue and peripheral blood has emerged as a critical tool for characterizing the anti-tumor humoral immune response and predicting clinical outcomes to immunotherapy. In the context of non-small cell lung cancer (NSCLC), BCR metrics obtained through sequencing of both tumour tissue and peripheral blood have been shown to predict with high accuracy the probability of achieving a complete pathological response (CPR) following neoadjuvant chemo-immunotherapy treatment.

== See also ==
- Co-stimulation
- T-cell receptor
- IMGT
