= B-cell linker =

Mammalian protein found in Homo sapiens

BLNK

Identifiers
- Aliases: BLNK, AGM4, BASH, BLNK-S, LY57, SLP-65, SLP65, bca, B-cell linker, B cell linker
- External IDs: OMIM: 604515; MGI: 96878; GeneCards: BLNK
Available structures
PDB	Ortholog search: PDBe RCSB
PDB	List of PDB id codes 2EO6

Gene location (Human)
Chr.	Chromosome 10 (human)
Band	10q24.1	Start	96,189,171 bp
Band	10q24.1	End	96,271,587 bp

Gene location (Mouse)
Chr.	Chromosome 19 (mouse)
Band	19 C3|19 34.26 cM	Start	40,917,371 bp
Band	19 C3|19 34.26 cM	End	40,982,978 bp
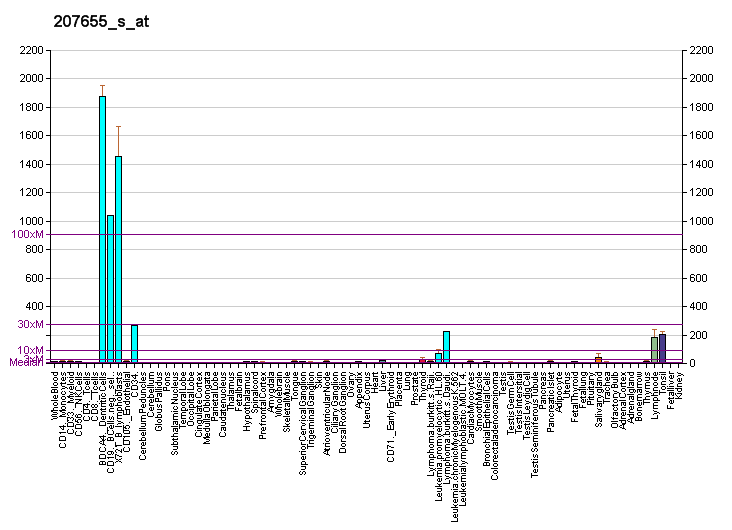
RNA expression pattern
Bgee	Human / Mouse (ortholog); Top expressed in: oral cavity; corpus epididymis; spleen; jejunal mucosa; duodenum; epithelium of nasopharynx; appendix; mucosa of pharynx; lymph node; right lobe of liver / Top expressed in: spleen; mesenteric lymph nodes; molar; left colon; seminal vesicula; tail of embryo; submandibular gland; temporal muscle; Ileal epithelium; tibiofemoral joint; More reference expression data
BioGPS	More reference expression data
Gene ontology
Molecular function	transmembrane receptor protein tyrosine kinase adaptor activity; protein binding
Cellular component	cytosol; membrane; cytoplasm; intracellular anatomical structure; plasma membrane; cytoplasmic ribonucleoprotein granule
Biological process	humoral immune response; B cell differentiation; intracellular signal transduction; B cell activation; inflammatory response; positive regulation of signal transduction; transmembrane receptor protein tyrosine kinase signaling pathway
Sources:Amigo / QuickGO
Orthologs
Databases	NCBI: entry; OMA: entry
Species	Human	Mouse
Entrez	29760	17060
Ensembl	ENSG00000095585	ENSMUSG00000061132
UniProt	Q8WV28	Q9QUN3
RefSeq (mRNA)	NM_001114094; NM_001258440; NM_001258441; NM_001258442; NM_013314	NM_008528; NM_001365054
RefSeq (protein)	NP_001107566; NP_001245369; NP_001245370; NP_001245371; NP_037446	NP_032554; NP_001351983
Location (UCSC)	Chr 10: 96.19 – 96.27 Mb	Chr 19: 40.92 – 40.98 Mb
PubMed search
- Wikidata
View/Edit Human	View/Edit Mouse

B-cell linker (BLNK) protein is expressed in B cells and macrophages and plays a large role in B cell receptor signaling. Like all adaptor proteins, BLNK has no known intrinsic enzymatic activity. Its function is to temporally and spatially coordinate and regulate downstream signaling effectors in B cell receptor (BCR) signaling, which is important in B cell development. Binding of these downstream effectors is dependent on BLNK phosphorylation. BLNK is encoded by the BLNK gene and is also known as SLP-65, BASH, and BCA.

== Structure and localization ==
BLNK consists of a N-terminal leucine zipper motif followed by an acidic region, a proline-rich region, and a C-terminal SH2 domain. The leucine zipper motif allows BLNK to localize to the plasma membrane, presumably by coiled-coil interactions with a membrane protein. This leucine zipper motif distinguishes BLNK from lymphoctye cytosolic protein 2, also known as LCP-2 or SLP-76, which plays a similar role in T cell receptor signaling. Although LCP-2 has an N-terminal heptad-like organization of leucine and isoleucine residues like BLNK, it has not been experimentally shown to have the leucine zipper motif. Recruitment of BLNK to the plasma membrane is also achieved by binding of the SH2 domain of BLNK to a non-ITAM phospho-tyrosine on the cytoplasmic domain of CD79A, which is a part of Igα and the B cell receptor complex.

== Function ==
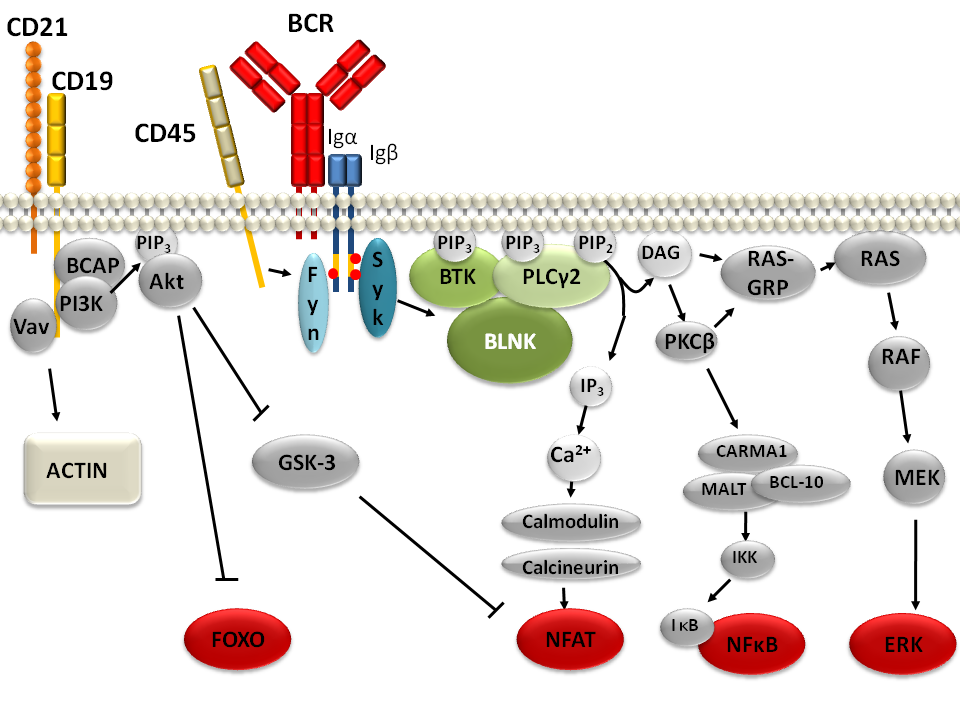
BLNK's function and interaction shown in a schematic of BCR signaling pathways. BCR antigen recognition activates Src family kinases, including the SYK and BTK tyrosine kinases. Syk then phosphorylates BLNK, which can recruit downstream signaling molecules such as Grb2, PLCG2, Vav and Nck.

BLNK's function and importance in B cell development were first illustrated in BLNK deficient DT40 cells, a chicken B cell line. DT40 cells had interrupted B cell development: there was no calcium mobilization response in the B cell, impaired activation of the mitogen-activated protein (MAP) kinases p38, JNK, and somewhat inhibited ERK activation upon (BCR) activation as compared to wild type DT40 cells. In knockout mice, BLNK deficiency results in a partial block in B cell development, and in humans BLNK deficiency results in a much more profound block in B cell development.

Linker or adaptor proteins provide mechanisms by which receptors can amplify and regulate downstream effector proteins. BLNK is essential for normal B-cell development as part of the B cell receptor signaling pathway. [supplied by OMIM]

Evidence also suggests that BLNK may have tumor suppressive activity through its interaction with Bruton's tyrosine kinase (Btk) and regulation of the pre-B cell checkpoint.

== Phosphorylation and interactions ==
The acidic region of BLNK contains several inducibly phosphorylated tyrosine residues, at least five of which are found in humans. Evidence suggests that BLNK is phosphorylated by the tyrosine-protein kinase Syk after B cell receptor activation. Phosphorylation of these residues provides docking sites necessary for downstream protein-protein interactions between BLNK and the SH2 domain-containing proteins Grb2, PLCG2, Btk, the Vav protein family, and Nck. BLNK has also been shown to interact with SH3KBP1 and MAP4K1. A more recent mass spectrometry study of BLNK in DT40 cells found that at least 41 unique serine, threonine, and tyrosine residues are phosphorylated on BLNK.
