= LYN =

Mammalian protein found in Homo sapiens

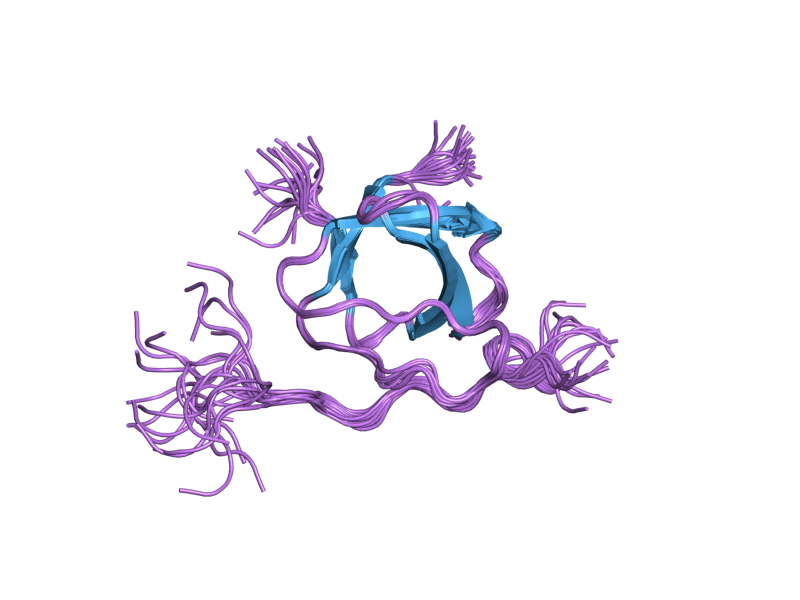

Identifiers
- Aliases: LYN, LYN proto-oncogene, Src family tyrosine kinase, JTK8, p53Lyn, p56Lyn
- External IDs: OMIM: 165120; MGI: 96892; GeneCards: LYN
Available structures
PDB	Ortholog search: PDBe RCSB
PDB	List of PDB id codes 1W1F, 1WA7, 3A4O
Enzyme activity
EC #	BRENDA	ExPASy	KEGG	MetaCyc
2.7.10.2	↗	↗	↗	↗

Gene location (Human)
Chr.	Chromosome 8 (human)
Band	8q12.1	Start	55,879,835 bp
Band	8q12.1	End	56,014,169 bp

Gene location (Mouse)
Chr.	Chromosome 4 (mouse)
Band	4 A1|4 2.05 cM	Start	3,678,115 bp
Band	4 A1|4 2.05 cM	End	3,813,122 bp
RNA expression pattern
Bgee	Human / Mouse (ortholog); Top expressed in: monocyte; blood; palpebral conjunctiva; bone marrow; nasal epithelium; bone marrow cell; appendix; periodontal fiber; granulocyte; trabecular bone / Top expressed in: stroma of bone marrow; granulocyte; blood; mesenteric lymph nodes; Vasculature of brain; spleen; tibiofemoral joint; right lung lobe; left lung; left lung lobe; More reference expression data
BioGPS	n/a
Gene ontology
Molecular function	transmembrane transporter binding; SH3 domain binding; protein-containing complex binding; kinase activity; gamma-tubulin binding; signaling receptor binding; ATP binding; protein kinase activity; non-membrane spanning protein tyrosine kinase activity; enzyme binding; transferase activity; platelet-derived growth factor receptor binding; integrin binding; protein binding; glycosphingolipid binding; protein tyrosine kinase activity; nucleotide binding; phosphoprotein binding; ubiquitin protein ligase binding; ephrin receptor binding; phosphorylation-dependent protein binding
Cellular component	cytoplasm; cytosol; membrane; extrinsic component of cytoplasmic side of plasma membrane; mitochondrial intermembrane space; perinuclear region of cytoplasm; nucleus; mitochondrial membranes; membrane raft; extracellular exosome; Golgi apparatus; plasma membrane; postsynaptic density; mast cell granule; integrin alpha2-beta1 complex; mitochondrial crista; intracellular membrane-bounded organelle; glutamatergic synapse; postsynaptic specialization, intracellular component
Biological process	regulation of protein phosphorylation; cellular response to extracellular stimulus; cellular response to retinoic acid; positive regulation of B cell receptor signaling pathway; tolerance induction to self antigen; regulation of mast cell activation; regulation of cell adhesion mediated by integrin; cellular response to heat; response to amino acid; hemopoiesis; adaptive immune response; regulation of erythrocyte differentiation; cellular response to DNA damage stimulus; positive regulation of Fc receptor mediated stimulatory signaling pathway; platelet activation; Fc-epsilon receptor signaling pathway; protein phosphorylation; regulation of B cell apoptotic process; positive regulation of dendritic cell apoptotic process; positive regulation of glial cell proliferation; response to carbohydrate; regulation of platelet aggregation; negative regulation of cell population proliferation; B cell receptor signaling pathway; negative regulation of myeloid leukocyte differentiation; dendritic cell differentiation; Fc receptor mediated inhibitory signaling pathway; Fc-gamma receptor signaling pathway involved in phagocytosis; transmembrane receptor protein tyrosine kinase signaling pathway; regulation of B cell receptor signaling pathway; stimulatory C-type lectin receptor signaling pathway; response to sterol depletion; positive regulation of stress-activated protein kinase signaling cascade; regulation of cytokine production; response to insulin; positive regulation of mast cell proliferation; negative regulation of MAP kinase activity; regulation of ERK1 and ERK2 cascade; positive regulation of peptidyl-tyrosine phosphorylation; erythrocyte differentiation; protein autophosphorylation; oligodendrocyte development; regulation of mast cell degranulation; positive regulation of phosphorylation; viral process; response to toxic substance; negative regulation of protein phosphorylation; Fc receptor mediated stimulatory signaling pathway; growth hormone receptor signaling pathway via JAK-STAT; phosphorylation; immune system process; regulation of release of sequestered calcium ion into cytosol; positive regulation of tyrosine phosphorylation of STAT protein; B cell homeostasis; immune response-regulating cell surface receptor signaling pathway; response to axon injury; negative regulation of mast cell proliferation; regulation of inflammatory response; peptidyl-tyrosine autophosphorylation; response to hormone; regulation of monocyte chemotaxis; leukocyte migration; lipopolysaccharide-mediated signaling pathway; histamine secretion by mast cell; intracellular signal transduction; response to organic cyclic compound; negative regulation of intracellular signal transduction; positive regulation of cell migration; ephrin receptor signaling pathway; negative regulation of toll-like receptor 2 signaling pathway; T cell costimulation; response to peptide hormone; platelet degranulation; blood coagulation; positive regulation of phosphatidylinositol 3-kinase activity; positive regulation of oligodendrocyte progenitor proliferation; negative regulation of immune response; positive regulation of cell population proliferation; positive regulation of neuron projection development; negative regulation of ERK1 and ERK2 cascade; peptidyl-tyrosine phosphorylation; negative regulation of B cell proliferation; negative regulation of toll-like receptor 4 signaling pathway; signal transduction; innate immune response; neuron projection development; central nervous system development; inflammatory response; positive regulation of protein phosphorylation; positive regulation of phosphatidylinositol 3-kinase signaling; cell differentiation; positive regulation of Ras protein signal transduction; positive regulation of aspartic-type endopeptidase activity involved in amyloid precursor protein catabolic process
Sources:Amigo / QuickGO
Orthologs
Databases	NCBI: entry; OMA: entry
Species	Human	Mouse
Entrez	4067	17096
Ensembl	ENSG00000254087	ENSMUSG00000042228
UniProt	P07948	P25911
RefSeq (mRNA)	NM_001111097; NM_002350	NM_001111096; NM_010747
RefSeq (protein)	NP_001104567; NP_002341	NP_001104566; NP_034877
Location (UCSC)	Chr 8: 55.88 – 56.01 Mb	Chr 4: 3.68 – 3.81 Mb
PubMed search
- Wikidata
View/Edit Human	View/Edit Mouse

Tyrosine-protein kinase Lyn is a protein that in humans is encoded by the LYN gene.

Lyn is a member of the Src family of protein tyrosine kinases, which is mainly expressed in hematopoietic cells, in neural tissues liver, and adipose tissue. In various hematopoietic cells, Lyn has emerged as a key enzyme involved in the regulation of cell activation. In these cells, a small amount of LYN is associated with cell surface receptor proteins, including the B cell antigen receptor (BCR), CD40, or CD19. The abbreviation Lyn is derived from Lck/Yes novel tyrosine kinase, Lck and Yes also being members of the Src kinase family.

== Function ==
Lyn has been described to have an inhibitory role in myeloid lineage proliferation. Following engagement of the B cell receptors, Lyn undergoes rapid phosphorylation and activation. This activation initiates a cascade of signaling events mediated by Lyn phosphorylation of tyrosine residues within the immunoreceptor tyrosine-based activation motifs (ITAMs) of receptor proteins. This cascade leads to the recruitment and activation of other kinases, including Syk, phospholipase Cγ2 (PLCγ2), and phosphatidyl inositol-3 kinase. These kinases generate activation signals critical for proliferation, Ca^{2+} mobilization, and cell differentiation.

Lyn also plays an essential role in transmitting inhibitory signals by phosphorylating tyrosine residues within the immunoreceptor tyrosine-based inhibitory motifs (ITIMs) of regulatory proteins such as CD22, PIR-B, and FCγRIIb1. ITIM phosphorylation subsequently recruits and activates phosphatases including SHIP-1 and SHP-1, leading to the attenuation of signaling pathways, downregulation of cell activation, and promotion of tolerance. In B cells, Lyn sets the threshold of signaling and maintains the balance between activation and inhibition, effectively functioning as a rheostat rather than a binary switch.

LYN is reported to be a key mediator of estrogen-dependent suppression of human osteoclast differentiation, survival, and function. It has also been implicated in the insulin signaling pathway, where activated Lyn phosphorylates insulin receptor substrate 1 (IRS1), promoting Glut-4 translocation to the membrane and enhancing glucose utilization. Insulin receptor activation has been shown to increase Lyn autophosphorylation, suggesting a feedback loop.

Lyn has been shown to protect against hepatocellular apoptosis and promote liver regeneration by preserving mitochondrial integrity.

In pulmonary function, Lyn activation in pulmonary epithelium has been linked to improved barrier integrity and reduced edema. Lyn activation in alveolar phagocytes enhances bacterial phagocytosis and reduces pulmonary infections. Furthermore, Lyn activation has been shown to reduce pulmonary mucus hypersecretion.

== Clinical significance ==
=== As a drug target ===
HSP90 inhibitor NVP-BEP800 has been reported to affect Lyn kinase stability and inhibit the growth of B-cell acute lymphoblastic leukemias by interfering with NF-kappaB signaling.

The allosteric activator of Lyn kinase Tolimidone (MLR-1023) is currently under Phase 2a clinical investigation for Type II diabetes, with promising results reported from studies conducted by Melior Discovery.

The insulin secretagogue glimepiride (Amaryl®) activates Lyn in adipocytes by disrupting lipid rafts, potentially contributing to its extrapancreatic glycemic control effects. Tolimidone (MLR-1023), a small-molecule allosteric activator of Lyn kinase with an EC_{50} of 63 nM, is under Phase 2a investigation for Type II diabetes.

=== Pathology ===
Much of the current knowledge about Lyn has emerged from studies of genetically manipulated mice. Lyn deficient mice display a phenotype that includes splenomegaly, a dramatic increase in numbers of myeloid progenitors and monocyte/macrophage tumors. Biochemical analysis of cells from these mutants revealed that Lyn is essential in establishing ITIM-dependent inhibitory signaling and for activation of specific protein tyrosine phosphatases within myeloid cells.

Mice that expressed a hyperactive Lyn allele were tumor free and displayed no propensity toward hematological malignancy. These mice have reduced numbers of conventional B lymphocytes, down-regulated surface immunoglobulin M and costimulatory molecules, and elevated numbers of B1a B cells. With age these animals developed a glomerulonephritis phenotype associated with a 30% reduction in life expectancy.

== Interactions ==
LYN has been shown to interact with:

- BCAR1,
- CD117,
- CD22,
- Cdk1,
- DOK1,
- EPOR
- GPVI,
- INPP5D,
- IRS1,
- LCP2,
- MUC1,
- NEDD9,
- PLCG2,
- PPP1R15A,
- PTPRC,
- Syk,
- TRPV4,
- UNC119,

== See also ==
- Lyn-CD22-SHP-1 pathway
