= Cerdulatinib =

Chemical compound

Clinical data
- Other names: PRT062070, PRT2070, DMVT-502
- Routes of administration: By mouth

Identifiers
- IUPAC name: 4-(Cyclopropylamino)-2-[4-(4-ethylsulfonylpiperazin-1-yl)anilino]pyrimidine-5-carboxamide
- CAS Number: 1198300-79-6
- PubChem CID: 44595079
- ChemSpider: 32822046
- UNII: D1LXQ45S1O
- CompTox Dashboard (EPA): DTXSID001115521

Chemical and physical data
- Formula: C_{20}H_{27}N_{7}O_{3}S
- Molar mass: 445.54 g·mol^{−1}
- 3D model (JSmol): Interactive image
- SMILES: CCS(=O)(=O)N1CCN(CC1)C2=CC=C(C=C2)NC3=NC=C(C(=N3)NC4CC4)C(=O)N
- InChI: InChI=1S/C20H27N7O3S/c1-2-31(29,30)27-11-9-26(10-12-27)16-7-5-15(6-8-16)24-20-22-13-17(18(21)28)19(25-20)23-14-3-4-14/h5-8,13-14H,2-4,9-12H2,1H3,(H2,21,28)(H2,22,23,24,25); Key:BGLPECHZZQDNCD-UHFFFAOYSA-N

Cerdulatinib is a small molecule SYK/JAK kinase inhibitor in development for treatment of hematological malignancies. It has lowest nM IC50 values against TYK2, JAK1, JAK2, JAK3, FMS, and SYK.

It is being developed by Portola Pharmaceuticals; in September 2018 the FDA granted orphan drug status to cerdulatinib for the treatment of peripheral T-cell lymphoma (PTCL).

== See also ==
- Ruxolitinib
- Fostamatinib
- Entospletinib
