= BTK =

BTK, Btk, etc. may refer to:

== People ==
- Dennis Rader, an American serial killer nicknamed "BTK" (for "bind, torture, kill")

== Biology and medicine ==
- Bacillus thuringiensis kurstaki (Btk), a soil-dwelling bacterium also used as an insecticide
- Bruton's tyrosine kinase, a protein
  - Btk-type zinc finger or Btk motif (BM), a zinc-binding motif present in some eukaryotic signalling proteins

Medicine

- BTK (below-the-knee amputation), amputation of the lower limb between the knee joint and the ankle joint

== Music ==
- "BTK", a song by American band Exodus on their 2014 album Blood In, Blood Out
- "B.T.K. (Dennis Rader)", a song by Japanese band Church of Misery on their 2013 album "Thy Kingdom Scum"
- "Bind Torture Kill", a song by American band Suffocation on their 2006 self-titled album
- Bind, Torture, Kill, a 2006 album by Belgian band Suicide Commando
- Birth Through Knowledge, a Canadian hip-hop/rock band

== Telecommunications ==
- Bulgarian Telecommunications Company, (БТК in Cyrillic)
- Information and Communication Technologies Authority in Turkey, (abbreviated as BTK in Turkish)

== Transportation ==
- Baku–Tbilisi–Kars railway connecting Azerbaijan, Georgia and Turkey
- ICAO airline code for Indonesian airline Batik Air
- IATA airport code for Bratsk Airport, Russia

== Other uses ==
- BTK, the ISO 639-2 and ISO 639-5 codes for Batak languages
- Kaiser-Fleetwings XBTK, a US Navy dive and torpedo bomber
- Pillars of Truth (Boutokaan Te Koaua), a political party in Kiribati

== See also ==
- Born to Kill (disambiguation)
