= B29 =

B29 may refer to:

- B-29 Superfortress, an aircraft
- A human gene also known as CD79B
- Sicilian Defence, Encyclopaedia of Chess Openings code
