= VPREB1 =

Protein-coding gene in the species Homo sapiens

Identifiers
- Aliases: VPREB1, IGI, IGVPB, VPREB, CD179a, pre-B lymphocyte 1, V-set pre-B cell surrogate light chain 1
- External IDs: OMIM: 605141; MGI: 98936; GeneCards: VPREB1
Available structures
PDB	Ortholog search: PDBe RCSB
PDB	List of PDB id codes 2H32, 2H3N, 3BJ9

Gene location (Human)
Chr.	Chromosome 22 (human)
Band	22q11.22	Start	22,244,780 bp
Band	22q11.22	End	22,245,515 bp

Gene location (Mouse)
Chr.	Chromosome 16 (mouse)
Band	16 A3|16 10.46 cM	Start	16,686,267 bp
Band	16 A3|16 10.46 cM	End	16,688,707 bp
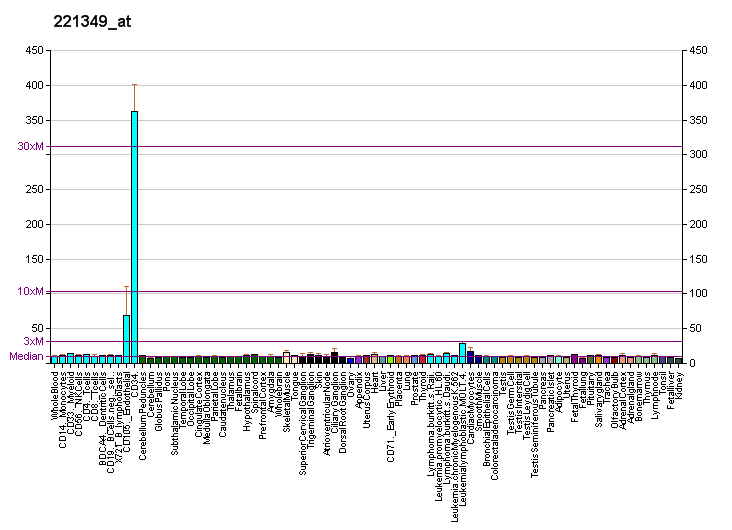
RNA expression pattern
Bgee	Human / Mouse (ortholog); Top expressed in: testicle; bone marrow; bone marrow cell; trabecular bone; granulocyte; lymph node; tonsil; blood; cecum; appendix / Top expressed in: choroid plexus; choroid plexus of fourth ventricle; bone marrow; embryo; embryo; granulocyte; right kidney; morula; thymus; human kidney; More reference expression data
BioGPS	More reference expression data
Orthologs
Databases	NCBI: entry; OMA: entry
Species	Human	Mouse
Entrez	7441	22362
Ensembl	ENSG00000169575	ENSMUSG00000059305
UniProt	P12018	P13372
RefSeq (mRNA)	NM_007128; NM_001303509	NM_016982
RefSeq (protein)	NP_001290438; NP_009059	NP_058678
Location (UCSC)	Chr 22: 22.24 – 22.25 Mb	Chr 16: 16.69 – 16.69 Mb
PubMed search
- Wikidata
View/Edit Human	View/Edit Mouse

Immunoglobulin iota chain is a protein that in humans is encoded by the VPREB1 gene. VPREB1 has also recently been designated CD179A (cluster of differentiation 179A). The product, CD179a (VpreB) is a 126 aa-long polypeptide with apparent MW of 16-18 kDa.

== Tissue distribution ==
VPREB1 is expressed selectively at the early stages of B cell development, namely, in proB and early preB cells.

== Structure ==
Two copies of IGLL1+VPREB1 (CD179B+CD179A) forms a pre-B cell receptor (pre-BCR) with the membrane-bound IgM (μ) heavy chain and the signaling molecules Igα and Igβ (CD79). Compared to the true BCR, IGLL1 and VPREB1 together take the place of the light chain, hence the name "surrogate light chain". In the surrogate light chain, IGLL1 takes the role of the C (constant) region while VPREB takes the role of the V ("variable") region.

CD179a has an Ig V domain-like structure, but lacks the last beta-strand (beta7) of a typical V domain. Instead, it has a carboxyl terminal end that shows no sequence homologies to any other proteins. CD179a associates non-covalently with CD179b (IGLL1) carrying an Ig C domain-like structure to form an Ig light chain-like structure, which is called the surrogate light chain or pseudo light chain. In this complex, the incomplete V domain of CD179a appears to be complemented by the extra beta7 strand of CD179b. On the surface of early preB cells, CD179a/CD179b surrogate light chain is disulfide-linked to membrane-bound Ig mu heavy chain in association with a signal transducer CD79a/CD79b heterodimer to form a B cell receptor-like structure, so-called preB cell receptor (preBCR).

== Function ==
PreBCR transduces signals for: 1) cellular proliferation, differentiation from the proB cell to preB cell stage, 2) allelic exclusion at the Ig heavy chain gene locus, and 3) promotion of Ig light chain gene rearrangements. Thus, preBCR functions as a checkpoint in early B cell development to monitor the production of Ig mu heavy chain through a functional rearrangement of Ig heavy chain gene as well as the potency of Ig mu heavy chain to associate with Ig light chain.

== Clinical significance ==
Though no CD179a-related human disease or pathology has been reported yet, the deficiency of other components of preB cell receptor such as CD179b, Ig mu heavy chain and CD79a has been shown to result in severe impairment of B cell development and agammaglobulinemia in human.
