= TNB-486 =

Experimental drug

Monoclonal antibody
- Type: ?
- Target: CD19, CD3

Clinical data
- Other names: AZD0486

Identifiers
- UNII: 3QW12I37H1

TNB-486 (also known as AZD0486) "is a novel CD19xCD3 bispecific T-cell engager (TCE) that incorporates a unique anti-CD3 moiety designed to reduce cytokine release syndrome by binding to T-cells with low affinity". The drug is developed for cancer by AstraZeneca since its acquisition of TeneoTwo in 2022.
