= IGLL1 =

Protein-coding gene in the species Homo sapiens

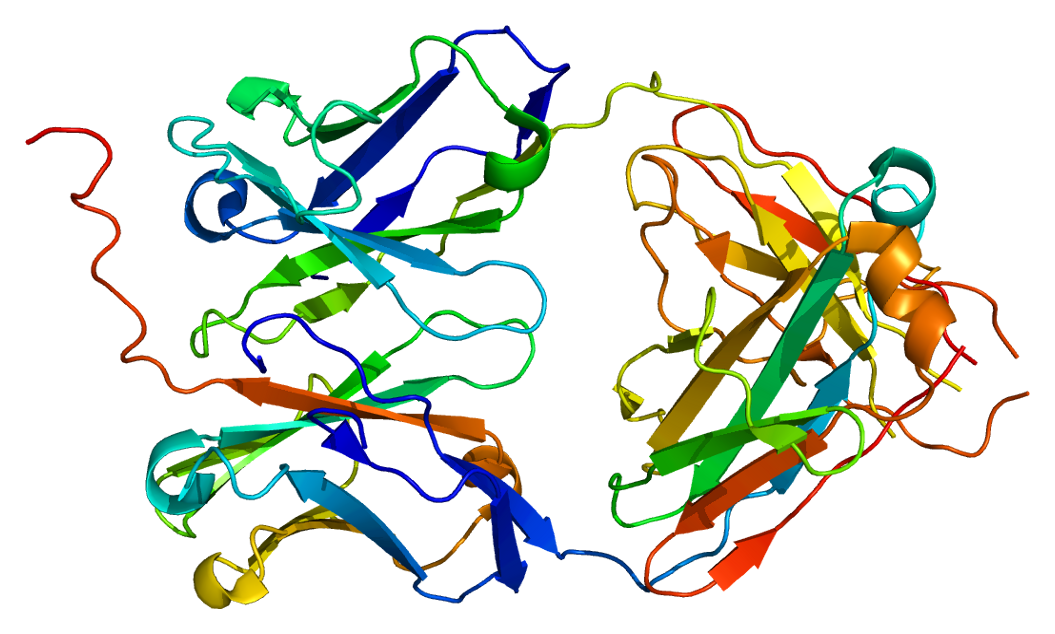

Identifiers
- Aliases: IGLL1, 14.1, AGM2, CD179b, IGL1, IGL5, IGLJ14.1, IGLL, IGO, IGVPB, VPREB2, immunoglobulin lambda like polypeptide 1
- External IDs: OMIM: 146770; MGI: 96529; GeneCards: IGLL1
Available structures
PDB	Ortholog search: PDBe RCSB
PDB	List of PDB id codes 2H32, 2H3N, 2LKQ

Gene location (Human)
Chr.	Chromosome 22 (human)
Band	22q11.23	Start	23,573,125 bp
Band	22q11.23	End	23,580,302 bp

Gene location (Mouse)
Chr.	Chromosome 16 (mouse)
Band	16 A3|16 10.45 cM	Start	16,678,535 bp
Band	16 A3|16 10.45 cM	End	16,681,849 bp
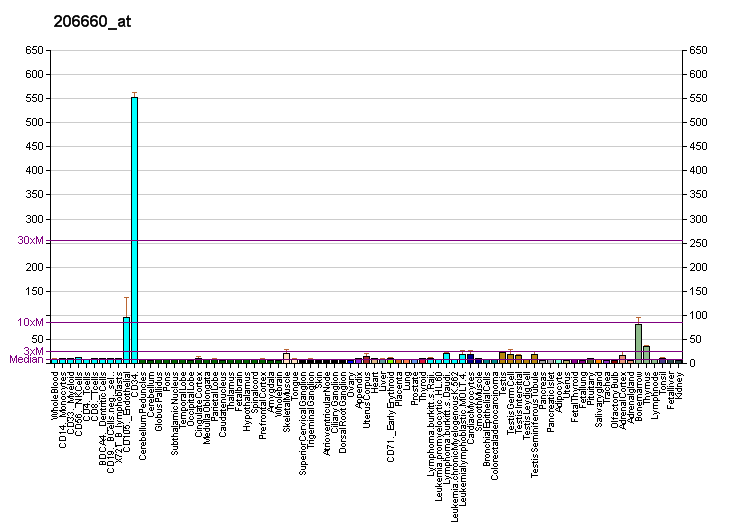

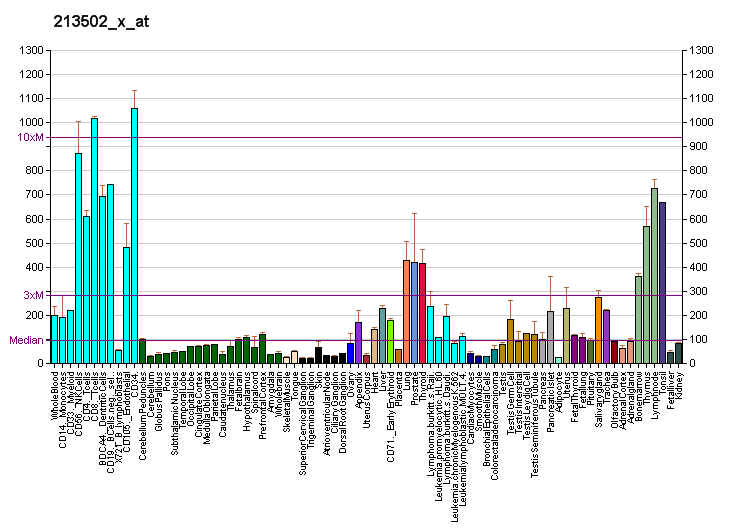
RNA expression pattern
Bgee	Human / Mouse (ortholog); Top expressed in: bone marrow; bone marrow cell; testicle; left testis; right testis; trabecular bone; thymus; monocyte; lymph node; spleen / Top expressed in: bone marrow; granulocyte; embryo; choroid plexus; brown adipose tissue; choroid plexus of fourth ventricle; Region I of hippocampus proper; inferior colliculi; secondary oocyte; CA3 field; More reference expression data
BioGPS	More reference expression data
Gene ontology
Molecular function	immunoglobulin receptor binding; antigen binding
Cellular component	blood microparticle; membrane; external side of plasma membrane; immunoglobulin complex, circulating; extracellular region
Biological process	B cell receptor signaling pathway; phagocytosis, recognition; positive regulation of B cell activation; phagocytosis, engulfment; innate immune response; defense response to bacterium; immune response; complement activation, classical pathway; leukocyte migration
Sources:Amigo / QuickGO
Orthologs
Databases	NCBI: entry; OMA: entry
Species	Human	Mouse
Entrez	3543	16136
Ensembl	ENSG00000128322	ENSMUSG00000075370
UniProt	P15814	P20764
RefSeq (mRNA)	NM_020070; NM_152855; NM_001369906	NM_001190325
RefSeq (protein)	NP_064455; NP_690594; NP_001356835	NP_001177254
Location (UCSC)	Chr 22: 23.57 – 23.58 Mb	Chr 16: 16.68 – 16.68 Mb
PubMed search
- Wikidata
View/Edit Human	View/Edit Mouse

Immunoglobulin lambda-like polypeptide 1 is a protein that in humans is encoded by the IGLL1 gene. IGLL1 has also recently been designated CD179B (cluster of differentiation 179B).

Mutations in this gene can result in B cell deficiency and agammaglobulinemia-2, an autosomal recessive disease in which few or no gamma globulins or antibodies are made. Two transcript variants encoding different isoforms have been found for this gene.

== Function ==
Two copies of IGLL1+VPREB1 (CD179B+CD179A) forms a pre-B cell receptor (pre-BCR) with the membrane-bound IgM (μ) heavy chain and the signaling molecules Igα and Igβ (CD79). Compared to the true BCR, IGLL1 and VPREB1 together take the place of the light chain, hence the name "surrogate light chain". In the surrogate light chain, IGLL1 takes the role of the C (constant) region while VPREB takes the role of the V ("variable") region.

The pre-BCR is found on the surface of proB and preB cells, where it is involved in transduction of signals for cellular proliferation, differentiation from the proB cell to the preB cell stage, allelic exclusion at the Ig heavy chain gene locus, and promotion of Ig light chain gene rearrangements.

IGLL1 is a mammalian-specific duplication of a immunoglobulin light chain lambda. It is a member of the immunoglobulin gene superfamily. This gene does not undergo rearrangement.
