= Tolimidone =

Chemical compound

Clinical data
- Other names: CP-26154, MLR-1023

Identifiers
- IUPAC name: 5-(3-methylphenoxy)pyrimidin-2(1H)-one
- CAS Number: 41964-07-2
- PubChem CID: 39065
- ChemSpider: 35751
- UNII: MU3JD8E9IS
- KEGG: D06182
- ChEMBL: ChEMBL8030
- CompTox Dashboard (EPA): DTXSID50194786
- ECHA InfoCard: 100.230.742

Chemical and physical data
- Formula: C_{11}H_{10}N_{2}O_{2}
- Molar mass: 202.213 g·mol^{−1}
- 3D model (JSmol): Interactive image
- SMILES: O=C2/N=C\C(\Oc1cc(ccc1)C)=C/N2

Tolimidone (CP-26154; MLR-1023) is a compound which was discovered by scientists at Pfizer, was found to stimulate secretion of gastric mucosa, and was in development by Pfizer as a drug candidate to treat gastric ulcers but was abandoned. After the patent on the compound expired, scientists at the company Melior Discovery identified it as a potential drug candidate for diabetes through a phenotypic screen. The company proceeded to show that MLR-1023 is an allosteric activator of Lyn kinase with an EC50 of 63 nM. As of 2012 Melior was repurposing it for diabetes. In June 2016, the company reported positive results from their Phase 2a clinical study in diabetic subjects
