= Anti-CD19 immunotoxin =

Monoclonal antibody linked to a toxic substance

Anti-CD19 immunotoxin is a monoclonal antibody linked to a toxic substance. It is being studied in the treatment of some types of B-cell cancer. Anti-CD19 immunotoxin is made in the laboratory. It binds to CD19, a protein on the surface of normal B cells and B-cell tumors, and kills the cells.
