= CD79 =

Protein family

CD79a molecule, immunoglobulin-associated alpha

Identifiers
- Symbol: CD79A
- Alt. symbols: IG-alpha
- NCBI gene: 973
- HGNC: 1698
- OMIM: 112205
- RefSeq: NM_001783
- UniProt: P11912

Other data
- Locus: Chr. 19 q13.2
Search for
- Structures: Swiss-model
- Domains: InterPro

CD79b molecule, immunoglobulin-associated beta

Identifiers
- Symbol: CD79B
- Alt. symbols: IG-beta
- NCBI gene: 974
- HGNC: 1699
- OMIM: 147245
- RefSeq: NM_021602
- UniProt: P40259

Other data
- Locus: Chr. 17 q23
Search for
- Structures: Swiss-model
- Domains: InterPro

The CD79 receptor complex, also known as CD79A:CD79B or Igα:Igβ, is a heterodimeric signaling component of the B-cell receptor (BCR) complex. This transmembrane heterodimer consists of the B-cell antigen receptor complex-associated protein alpha chain (CD79A/Igα) and the B-cell antigen receptor complex-associated protein beta chain (CD79B/Igβ). The CD79 complex is expressed almost exclusively on B cells and B-cell neoplasms, making it valuable for differential diagnosis of B-cell malignancies from T-cell or myeloid neoplasms.

CD79a and CD79b are both members of the immunoglobulin superfamily. Human CD79a is encoded by the mb-1 gene that is located on chromosome 19, and CD79b is encoded by the B29 gene that located on chromosome 17. Both CD79 chains contain an immunoreceptor tyrosine-based activation motif (ITAM) in their intracellular tails that they use to propagate a signal in a B cell, in a similar manner to CD3-generated signal transduction observed during T cell receptor activation on T cells.

== Utilization ==
CD79 serves to be a pan-B cell marker for the detection of B-cell neoplasms. However, tumor cells in some cases of T-lymphoblastic leukemia/lymphoma and AML has shown to potentially react positively with CD79 monoclonal antibodies. In addition, both CD79 chains contain an immunoreceptor tyrosine-based activation motif (ITAM), which some scientists have found to propagate downstream signaling in B-cells. CD79 has been tested as a B-cell target in MRL/lpr mice, a mouse model for systemic lupus erythematosus (SLE). CD79, expressed by B-cell and plasma cell precursors is a candidate that induces apoptosis as well as inhibition of B-cell receptor (BCR) activation and possibly depletion of ectopic germinal centers (GC). However, research on CD79 still remains very open.

=== CD79 and BCR signaling ===
Scientists identified mutations in the BCR coreceptor CD79A/B that lead to chronic activation of BCR signaling. Somatic mutations affecting the ITAM signaling modules of CD79B and CD79A were detected frequently in biopsy samples. Moreover, some researchers believe that CD79 may emerge as an alternative target for the treatment of B-cell-dependent autoimmunity. Hardy et al. found that upon an Ag-induced BCR aggregation, CD79 is phosphorylated and initiates a cascade of downstream signaling events. Hardy et al. further characterized an alternate mode of BCR signaling that is induced by chronic AgR stimulation and maintains a state of B cell unresponsiveness termed "anergy". Other studies that focused on the deficiencies observed in neonatal antibody production can be due to various intrinsic features such as B-cell immaturity, poor B-cell repertoire or reduced strength of BCR signaling. Activation of the BCR with T-cell-dependent (TD) or TI antigens induces cross-linking of surface Ig molecules and binding to the transmembrane protein CD79.
