= CD79A =

Protein-coding gene in humans

Identifiers
- Aliases: CD79A, IGA, MB-1, CD79a molecule, MB1, IGAlpha
- External IDs: OMIM: 112205; MGI: 101774; GeneCards: CD79A
Available structures
PDB	Ortholog search: PDBe RCSB
PDB	List of PDB id codes 1CV9

Gene location (Human)
Chr.	Chromosome 19 (human)
Band	19q13.2	Start	41,877,279 bp
Band	19q13.2	End	41,881,372 bp

Gene location (Mouse)
Chr.	Chromosome 7 (mouse)
Band	7 A3|7 13.49 cM	Start	24,596,806 bp
Band	7 A3|7 13.49 cM	End	24,601,622 bp
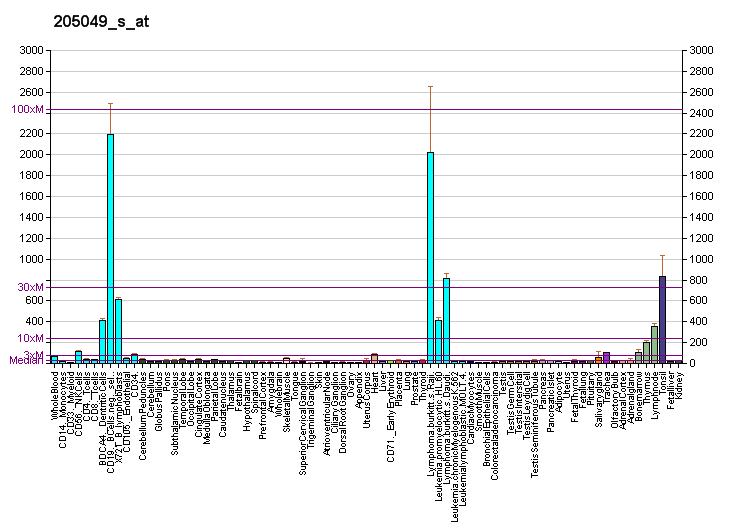
RNA expression pattern
Bgee	Human / Mouse (ortholog); Top expressed in: spleen; granulocyte; lymph node; appendix; bone marrow cell; blood; mucosa of ileum; mucosa of transverse colon; rectum; epithelium of colon / Top expressed in: spleen; bone marrow; granulocyte; thymus; colon; jejunum; ileum; lung; duodenum; embryo; More reference expression data
BioGPS	More reference expression data
Gene ontology
Molecular function	protein binding; transmembrane signaling receptor activity; protein homodimerization activity
Cellular component	integral component of membrane; multivesicular body; membrane raft; plasma membrane; membrane; external side of plasma membrane; cytoplasm; B cell receptor complex; integral component of plasma membrane
Biological process	B cell activation; B cell proliferation; cell surface receptor signaling pathway; adaptive immune response; immune system process; B cell differentiation; B cell receptor signaling pathway; protein homotetramerization
Sources:Amigo / QuickGO
Orthologs
Databases	NCBI: entry; OMA: entry
Species	Human	Mouse
Entrez	973	12518
Ensembl	ENSG00000105369	ENSMUSG00000003379
UniProt	P11912	P11911
RefSeq (mRNA)	NM_021601; NM_001783	NM_007655
RefSeq (protein)	NP_001774; NP_067612	NP_031681
Location (UCSC)	Chr 19: 41.88 – 41.88 Mb	Chr 7: 24.6 – 24.6 Mb
PubMed search
- Wikidata
View/Edit Human	View/Edit Mouse

Cluster of differentiation CD79A also known as B-cell antigen receptor complex-associated protein alpha chain and MB-1 membrane glycoprotein, is a protein that in humans is encoded by the CD79A gene.

The CD79a protein together with the related CD79b protein, forms a dimer associated with membrane-bound immunoglobulin in B-cells, thus forming the B-cell antigen receptor (BCR). This occurs in a similar manner to the association of CD3 with the T-cell receptor, and enables the cell to respond to the presence of antigens on its surface.

It is associated with agammaglobulinemia-3.

== Gene ==
The mouse CD79A gene, then called mb-1, was cloned in the late 1980s, followed by the discovery of human CD79A in the early 1990s. It is a short gene, 4.3 kb in length, with 5 exons encoding for 2 splice variants resulting in 2 isoforms.

CD79A is conserved and abundant among ray-finned fish (actinopterygii) but not in the evolutionarily more ancient chondrichthyes such as shark. The occurrence of CD79A thus coincides with the evolution of B cell receptors with greater diversity generated by recombination of multiple V, D, and J elements in bony fish contrasting the single V, D and J elements found in shark.

== Structure ==
CD79a is a membrane protein with an extracellular immunoglobulin domain, a single span transmembrane region and a short cytoplasmic domain. The cytoplasmic domain contains multiple phosphorylation sites including a conserved dual phosphotyrosine binding motif, termed immunotyrosine-based activation motif (ITAM). The larger CD79a isoform contains an insert in position 88-127 of human CD79a resulting in a complete immunoglobulin domain, whereas the smaller isoform has only a truncated Ig-like domain. CD79a has several cysteine residues, one of which forms covalent bonds with CD79b.

== Function ==
CD79a plays multiple and diverse roles in B cell development and function. The CD79a/b heterodimer associates non-covalently with the immunoglobulin heavy chain through its transmembrane region, thus forming the BCR along with the immunoglobulin light chain and the pre-BCR when associated with the surrogate light chain in developing B cells. Association of the CD79a/b heterodimer with the immunoglobulin heavy chain is required for surface expression of the BCR and BCR induced calcium flux and protein tyrosine phosphorylation. Genetic deletion of the transmembrane exon of CD79A results in loss of CD79a protein and a complete block of B cell development at the pro to pre B cell transition. Similarly, humans with homozygous splice variants in CD79A predicted to result in loss of the transmembrane region and a truncated or absent protein display agammaglobulinemia and no peripheral B cells.

The CD79a ITAM tyrosines (human CD79a Tyr188 and Tyr199, mouse CD79a Tyr182 and Tyr193) phosphorylated in response to BCR crosslinking are critical for binding of Src-homology 2 domain-containing kinases such as spleen tyrosine kinase (Syk) and signal transduction by CD79a. In vivo, the CD79a ITAM tyrosines synergize with the CD79b ITAM tyrosines to mediate the transition from the pro to the pre B cell stage as suggested by the analysis of mice with targeted mutations of the CD79a and CD79b ITAM. Loss of only one of the two functional CD79a/b ITAMs resulted in impaired B cell development but B cell functions such as the T cell independent type II response and BCR mediated calcium flux in the available B cells were intact. However, the presence of both the CD79a and CD79b ITAM tyrosines were required for normal T cell dependent antibody responses. The CD79a cytoplasmic domain further contains a non-ITAM tyrosine distal to the CD79a ITAM (human CD79a Tyr210, mouse CD79a Tyr204) that can bind BLNK and Nck once phosphorylated, and is critical for BCR mediated B cell proliferation and B1 cell development. CD79a ITAM tyrosine phosphorylation and signaling is negatively regulated by serine and threonine residues in direct proximity of the ITAM (human CD79a Ser197, Ser203, Thr209; mouse CD79a Ser191, Ser197, Thr203), and play a role in limiting formation of bone marrow plasma cells secreting IgG2a and IgG2b.

== Diagnostic relevance ==
The CD79a protein is present on the surface of B-cells throughout their life cycle, and is absent on all other healthy cells, making it a highly reliable marker for B-cells in immunohistochemistry. The protein remains present when B-cells transform into active plasma cells, and is also present in virtually all B-cell neoplasms, including B-cell lymphomas, plasmacytomas, and myelomas. It is also present in abnormal lymphocytes associated with some cases of Hodgkins disease. Because even on B-cell precursors, it can be used to stain a wider range of cells than can the alternative B-cell marker CD20, but the latter is more commonly retained on mature B-cell lymphomas, so that the two are often used together in immunohistochemistry panels.

== See also ==
- Cluster of differentiation
