= Sovleplenib =

Clinical data
- Other names: HMPL-523

Legal status
- Legal status: investigational

Identifiers
- IUPAC name: 7-[4-(1-methylsulfonylpiperidin-4-yl)phenyl]-N-[[(2S)-morpholin-2-yl]methyl]pyrido[3,4-b]pyrazin-5-amine
- CAS Number: 1415792-84-5
- PubChem CID: 71113742
- IUPHAR/BPS: 11886
- DrugBank: DB17557
- ChemSpider: 115010433
- UNII: 9CL6353KHO
- KEGG: D12953
- ChEBI: CHEBI:758620
- ChEMBL: ChEMBL5641911

Chemical and physical data
- Formula: C_{24}H_{30}N_{6}O_{3}S
- Molar mass: 482.60 g·mol^{−1}
- 3D model (JSmol): Interactive image
- SMILES: CS(=O)(=O)N1CCC(CC1)C2=CC=C(C=C2)C3=CC4=NC=CN=C4C(=N3)NC[C@@H]5CNCCO5
- InChI: InChI=InChI=1S/C24H30N6O3S/c1-34(31,32)30-11-6-18(7-12-30)17-2-4-19(5-3-17)21-14-22-23(27-9-8-26-22)24(29-21)28-16-20-15-25-10-13-33-20/h2-5,8-9,14,18,20,25H,6-7,10-13,15-16H2,1H3,(H,28,29)/t20-/m0/s1; Key:NJIAKNWTIVDSDA-FQEVSTJZSA-N

Sovleplenib is an investigational new drug that is being evaluated by Hutchison MediPharma for the treatment of immune thrombocytopenia (ITP) and warm antibody autoimmune hemolytic anemia (WAIHA). It has also been shown preclinically to have activity against B-cell lymphoma. Sovleplenib is a tyrosine-protein kinase SYK inhibitor.

== Clinical trials ==
Sovleplenib has completed a phase 3 clinical trial for ITP. Another phase 3 trial for WAIHA is on going.
