= Immunoglobulin C2-set domain =

Identifiers
- Symbol: C2-set
- Pfam: PF05790
- InterPro: IPR008424
Available protein structures:
- PDB: 1wipA:317–388 1wiqB:317–388 1wioB:317–388 1cid :316–386 1hngB:128–198 1hnf :135–205 1rzkC:125–203 1gc1C:125–203 1cdi :125–203 2b4cC:125–203 1g9nC:125–203 1cdu :125–203 1rzjC:125–203 1jl4D:125–203 1opwC:125–203 1cdy :125–203 1cdj :125–203 3cd4 :125–203 1optC:125–203 1cdh :125–203 1g9mC:125–203 1opnC:125–203 1vcaA:133–221 1ij9A:133–220 1vscA:133–219 IPR008424 PF05790 (ECOD; PDBsum)
- AlphaFold: IPR008424; PF05790

The basic structure of immunoglobulin (Ig) molecules is a tetramer of two light chains and two heavy chains linked by disulphide bonds. There are two types of light chains: kappa and lambda, each composed of a constant domain (CL) and a variable domain (VL). There are five types of heavy chains: alpha, delta, epsilon, gamma and mu, all consisting of a variable domain (VH) and three (in alpha, delta and gamma) or four (in epsilon and mu) constant domains (CH1 to CH4). Ig molecules are highly modular proteins, in which the variable and constant domains have clear, conserved sequence patterns. The domains in Ig and Ig-like molecules are grouped into four types: V-set (variable; InterPro: IPR013106), C1-set (constant-1; InterPro: IPR003597), C2-set (constant-2; InterPro: IPR008424) and I-set (intermediate; InterPro: IPR013098). Structural studies have shown that these domains share a common core Greek-key beta-sandwich structure, with the types differing in the number of strands in the beta-sheets as well as in their sequence patterns.

Immunoglobulin-like domains that are related in both sequence and structure can be found in several diverse protein families. Ig-like domains are involved in a variety of functions, including cell–cell recognition, cell-surface receptors, muscle structure and the immune system.

C2-set domains, which are Ig-like domains resembling the antibody constant domain. C2-set domains are found primarily in the mammalian T-cell surface antigens CD2 (Cluster of Differentiation 2), CD4 and CD80, as well as in vascular (VCAM) and intercellular (ICAM) cell adhesion molecules.

CD2 mediates T-cell adhesion via its ectodomain, and signal transduction utilising its 117-amino acid cytoplasmic tail. CD2 displays structural and functional similarities with African swine fever virus (ASFV) LMW8-DR, a protein that is involved in cell–cell adhesion and immune response modulation, suggesting a possible role in the pathogenesis of ASFV infection. CD4 is the primary receptor for HIV-1. CD4 has four immunoglobulin-like domains in its extracellular region that share the same structure, but can differ in sequence. Certain extracellular domains may be involved in dimerisation.

== Human proteins containing this domain ==
- CD2
- CD4
- VCAM1
