= Melior Discovery =

Biopharmaceutical company in Pennsylvania

- Company type: Private company
- Industry: Biotechnology
- Founded: 2005
- Founder: Andrew Reaume; Michael Saporito
- Headquarters: Exton, Pennsylvania
- Products: Pharmaceuticals, contract research
- Website: www.meliordiscovery.com

Melior Discovery, Inc. is a private biopharmaceutical company based in Exton, Pennsylvania, USA.

== Products and services ==
The company specializes in drug repositioning and has established a proprietary phenotypic screening platform that it uses for this purpose. Melior also offers certain contract research organization (CRO) services comprising animal models representing different disease conditions.

The Company has issued press releases disclosing partnerships with Pfizer, Merck & Co., Johnson & Johnson, and AstraZeneca, all citing the use of the company's drug repositioning technology. Melior Discovery has also used its technology to discover its own drug candidates.

== History ==
Melior Discovery was co-founded in 2005 by Dr. Andrew Reaume (President and CEO) and Dr. Michael Saporito (Vice President of Research). Its investors include Cammeby's Capital Group, VenturEast, Osage Ventures, Mid-Atlantic Angel Group, and BioAdvance.

In March 2009, the Food and Drug Administration (FDA) approved the company's Investigational New Drug (IND) application for a type 2 diabetes therapeutic candidate, MLR-1023. In 2013, the company reported a licensing partnership with Bukwang Pharmaceutical Company LTD and the initiation of clinical trials in March 2015. In June 2016, the company reported positive results from their Phase 2a clinical study in diabetic subjects.
