= Born to Kill =

Born to Kill may refer to:

== Film ==
- Born to Kill (1947 film), a film noir directed by Robert Wise
- Born to Kill (1967 film), a Spaghetti Western directed by Antonio Mollica
- Born to Kill (1974 film) or Cockfighter, a film directed by Monte Hellman
- Born to Kill (1996 film), a South Korean action film

== Music ==
- Born to Kill (album), an album by Social Distortion, or its title track
- "Born to Kill", a song by Airbourne from No Guts. No Glory.
- "Born to Kill", a song by The Damned from Damned Damned Damned
- "Born to Kill", a song by Gillan from Double Trouble
- "Born to Kill", a song by the Matthew Good Band from Beautiful Midnight
- "Born to Kill", a song by Rick Ross from Port of Miami 2
- "Born to Kill", a song by Scotch from Evolution
- "Born to Kill", a song by The Thermals from Desperate Ground

== Television ==
- "Born to Kill" (CSI: Miami), an episode of the TV series CSI: Miami
- Born to Kill (Bubblegum Crisis), an episode of the anime series Bubblegum Crisis
- Born to Kill?, a factual British TV series about serial killers
- Born to Kill (TV series), a 2017 British drama series

== Other uses ==
- Born to Kill (gang), a 1980s/1990s Vietnamese gang in New York City
- "Born to Kill", a catch-phrase from the 1987 film Full Metal Jacket
