= Tyrosine-protein kinase BLK =

Protein found in humans

BLK

Identifiers
- Aliases: BLK, MODY11, BLK proto-oncogene, Src family tyrosine kinase
- External IDs: OMIM: 191305; MGI: 88169; GeneCards: BLK
Enzyme activity
EC #	BRENDA	ExPASy	KEGG	MetaCyc
2.7.10.2	↗	↗	↗	↗

Gene location (Human)
Chr.	Chromosome 8 (human)
Band	8p23.1	Start	11,486,894 bp
Band	8p23.1	End	11,564,599 bp

Gene location (Mouse)
Chr.	Chromosome 14 (mouse)
Band	14 D1|14 33.25 cM	Start	63,610,285 bp
Band	14 D1|14 33.25 cM	End	63,654,486 bp
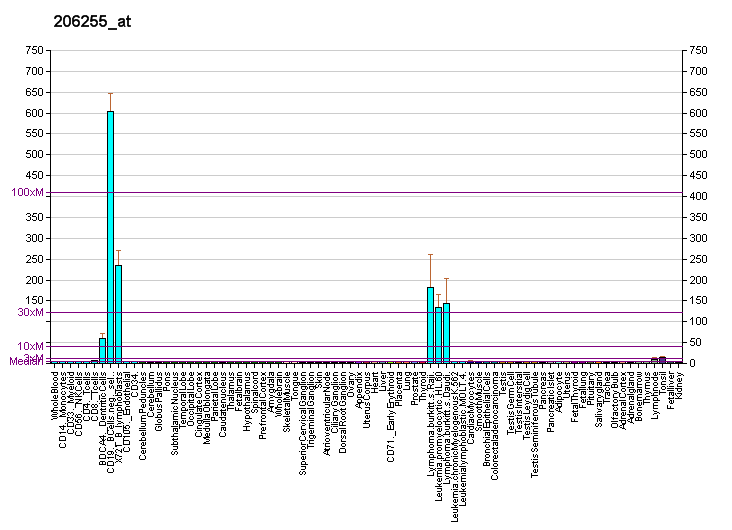
RNA expression pattern
Bgee	Human / Mouse (ortholog); Top expressed in: spleen; testicle; lymph node; granulocyte; appendix; mucosa of transverse colon; bone marrow cell; blood; tonsil; stromal cell of endometrium / Top expressed in: spleen; mesenteric lymph nodes; blood; granulocyte; thymus; subcutaneous adipose tissue; bone marrow; Ileal epithelium; axillary lymph node; tunica adventitia of aorta; More reference expression data
BioGPS	More reference expression data
Gene ontology
Molecular function	transferase activity; nucleotide binding; protein kinase activity; non-membrane spanning protein tyrosine kinase activity; kinase activity; protein binding; protein tyrosine kinase activity; signaling receptor binding; ATP binding
Cellular component	membrane; extrinsic component of cytoplasmic side of plasma membrane; plasma membrane; cytosol
Biological process	B cell receptor signaling pathway; cell differentiation; intracellular signal transduction; phosphorylation; transmembrane receptor protein tyrosine kinase signaling pathway; protein phosphorylation; regulation of cell population proliferation; peptidyl-tyrosine autophosphorylation; innate immune response; positive regulation of insulin secretion; cell migration; regulation of B cell receptor signaling pathway; peptidyl-tyrosine phosphorylation
Sources:Amigo / QuickGO
Orthologs
Databases	NCBI: entry; OMA: entry
Species	Human	Mouse
Entrez	640	12143
Ensembl	ENSG00000136573; ENSG00000285369	ENSMUSG00000014453
UniProt	P51451	P16277
RefSeq (mRNA)	NM_001715; NM_001330465	NM_007549
RefSeq (protein)	NP_001317394; NP_001706	NP_031575
Location (UCSC)	Chr 8: 11.49 – 11.56 Mb	Chr 14: 63.61 – 63.65 Mb
PubMed search
- Wikidata
View/Edit Human	View/Edit Mouse

Tyrosine-protein kinase BLK, also known as B lymphocyte kinase, is a non-receptor tyrosine kinase that in humans is encoded by the BLK gene. It is of the Src family of tyrosine kinases.

== Interactions ==
The tyrosine-protein kinase BLK has been shown to interact with UBE3A.
