= Entospletinib =

Chemical compound

Clinical data
- Other names: GS-9973

Legal status
- Legal status: Investigational

Identifiers
- IUPAC name: 6-(1H-Indazol-6-yl)-N-(4-morpholin-4-ylphenyl)imidazo[1,2-a]pyrazin-8-amine
- CAS Number: 1229208-44-9
- PubChem CID: 59473233
- IUPHAR/BPS: 7889
- DrugBank: 12121
- ChemSpider: 31042596
- UNII: 6I3O3W6O3B
- KEGG: D11209
- ChEMBL: ChEMBL3265032
- CompTox Dashboard (EPA): DTXSID001317670

Chemical and physical data
- Formula: C_{23}H_{21}N_{7}O
- Molar mass: 411.469 g·mol^{−1}
- 3D model (JSmol): Interactive image
- SMILES: c1cn2cc(-c3ccc4cn[nH]c4c3)nc(Nc3ccc(N4CCOCC4)cc3)c2n1
- InChI: InChI=1S/C23H21N7O/c1-2-17-14-25-28-20(17)13-16(1)21-15-30-8-7-24-23(30)22(27-21)26-18-3-5-19(6-4-18)29-9-11-31-12-10-29/h1-8,13-15H,9-12H2,(H,25,28)(H,26,27); Key:XSMSNFMDVXXHGJ-UHFFFAOYSA-N

Entospletinib is an experimental drug for the treatment of various types of cancer under development by Gilead Sciences. It is an inhibitor of spleen tyrosine kinase (Syk). It has entered clinical trials for acute myeloid leukaemia (AML), chronic lymphocytic leukemia (CLL), diffuse large B cell lymphoma (DLBCL), graft-versus-host disease (GvHD), hematological malignancies, mantle cell lymphoma (MCL), and non-Hodgkin lymphoma (NHL).
