= PLCG2 =

Protein-coding gene in the species Homo sapiens

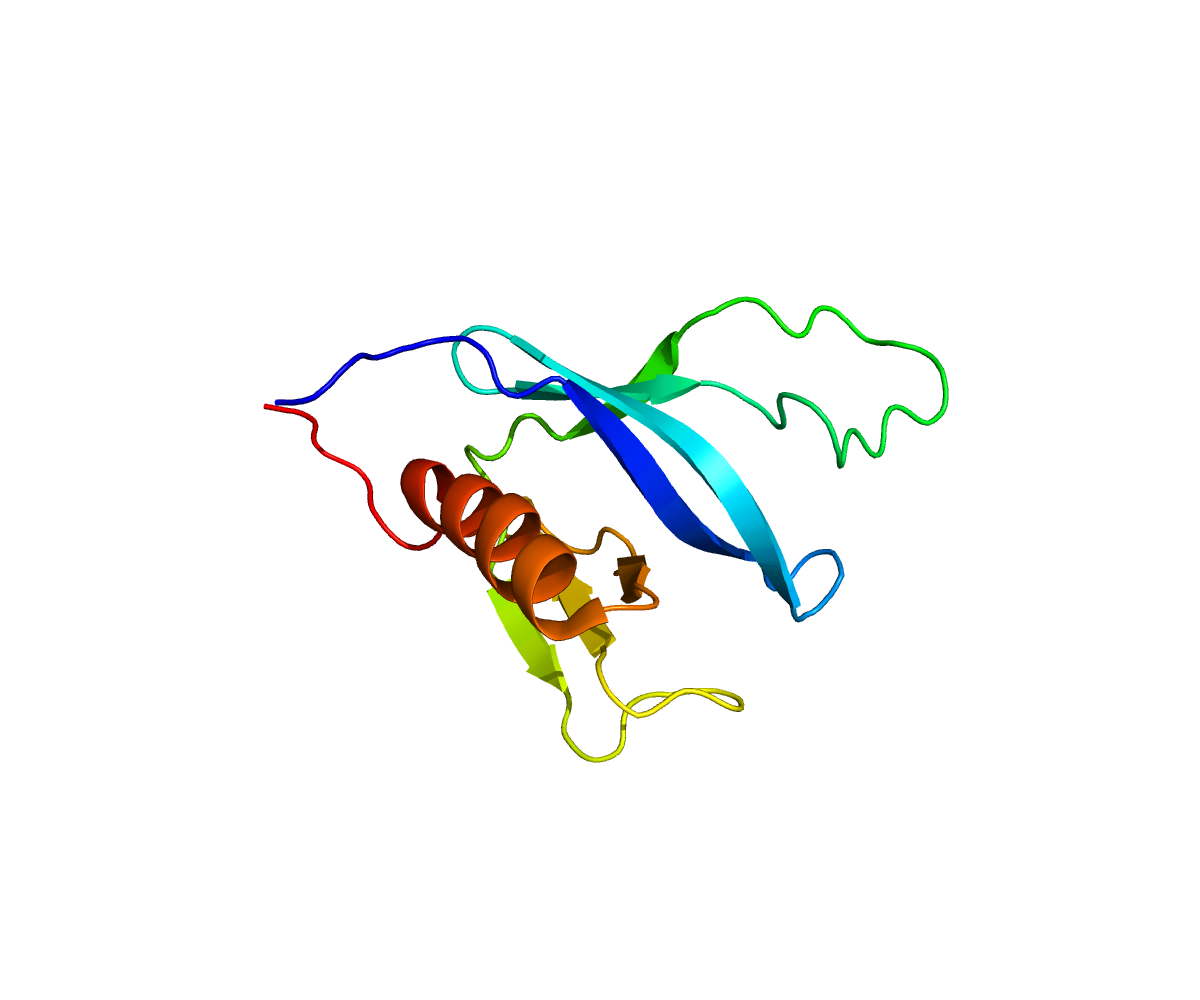

Identifiers
- Aliases: PLCG2, APLAID, FCAS3, PLC-IV, PLC-gamma-2, phospholipase C gamma 2
- External IDs: OMIM: 600220; MGI: 97616; GeneCards: PLCG2
Available structures
PDB	Ortholog search: PDBe RCSB
PDB	List of PDB id codes 2K2J, 2W2W, 2W2X
Enzyme activity
EC #	BRENDA	ExPASy	KEGG	MetaCyc
3.1.4.11	↗	↗	↗	↗

Gene location (Human)
Chr.	Chromosome 16 (human)
Band	16q23.3	Start	81,739,097 bp
Band	16q23.3	End	81,962,685 bp

Gene location (Mouse)
Chr.	Chromosome 8 (mouse)
Band	8 E1|8 64.26 cM	Start	118,225,030 bp
Band	8 E1|8 64.26 cM	End	118,361,881 bp
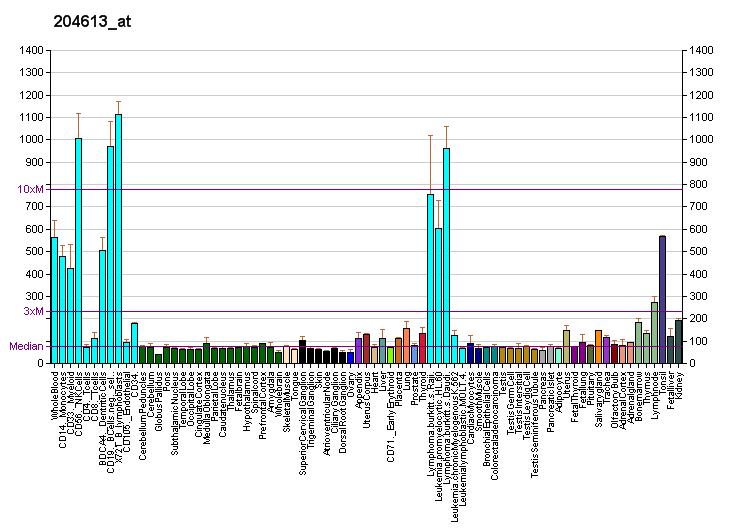
RNA expression pattern
Bgee	Human / Mouse (ortholog); Top expressed in: glomerulus; bone marrow cell; blood; metanephric glomerulus; epithelium of nasopharynx; spleen; granulocyte; endothelial cell; appendix; kidney tubule / Top expressed in: basilar part of occipital bone; granulocyte; tibiofemoral joint; mesenteric lymph nodes; spleen; bone marrow; blood; sphenoid bone; external carotid artery; internal carotid artery; More reference expression data
BioGPS	More reference expression data
Gene ontology
Molecular function	signal transducer activity; protein binding; phosphoric diester hydrolase activity; phospholipase C activity; hydrolase activity; phosphatidylinositol phospholipase C activity; phosphotyrosine residue binding
Cellular component	cytosol; plasma membrane; extracellular exosome
Biological process	B cell receptor signaling pathway; release of sequestered calcium ion into cytosol; intracellular signal transduction; inositol trisphosphate biosynthetic process; Fc-gamma receptor signaling pathway involved in phagocytosis; positive regulation of receptor internalization; lipid metabolism; stimulatory C-type lectin receptor signaling pathway; inositol phosphate metabolic process; Wnt signaling pathway; platelet activation; Fc-epsilon receptor signaling pathway; lipid catabolic process; follicular B cell differentiation; response to lipopolysaccharide; phospholipid catabolic process; regulation of gene expression; phosphatidylinositol biosynthetic process; negative regulation of programmed cell death; B cell differentiation; T cell receptor signaling pathway; activation of store-operated calcium channel activity; positive regulation of type I interferon production; calcium-mediated signaling; signal transduction; phosphatidylinositol-mediated signaling
Sources:Amigo / QuickGO
Orthologs
Databases	NCBI: entry; OMA: entry
Species	Human	Mouse
Entrez	5336	234779
Ensembl	ENSG00000197943	ENSMUSG00000034330
UniProt	P16885	Q8CIH5
RefSeq (mRNA)	NM_002661	NM_172285
RefSeq (protein)	NP_002652	NP_758489
Location (UCSC)	Chr 16: 81.74 – 81.96 Mb	Chr 8: 118.23 – 118.36 Mb
PubMed search
- Wikidata
View/Edit Human	View/Edit Mouse

1-Phosphatidylinositol-4,5-bisphosphate phosphodiesterase gamma-2 is an enzyme that in humans is encoded by the PLCG2 gene.

== Function ==
From OMIM as of March 24, 2020:

Enzymes of the phospholipase C family catalyze the hydrolysis of phospholipids to yield diacylglycerols and water-soluble phosphorylated derivatives of the lipid head groups. A number of these enzymes have specificity for phosphoinositides. Of the phosphoinositide-specific phospholipase C enzymes, C-beta is regulated by heterotrimeric G protein-coupled receptors, while the closely related C-gamma-1 (PLCG1; MIM 172420) and C-gamma-2 enzymes are controlled by receptor tyrosine kinases. The C-gamma-1 and C-gamma-2 enzymes are composed of phospholipase domains that flank regions of homology to noncatalytic domains of the SRC oncogene product, SH2 and SH3.

== Interactions ==
PLCG2 has been shown to interact with:

- Bruton's tyrosine kinase,
- GAB2,
- LYN,
- PTPN11, and
- SHC1
