= Btk-type zinc finger =

Btk motif
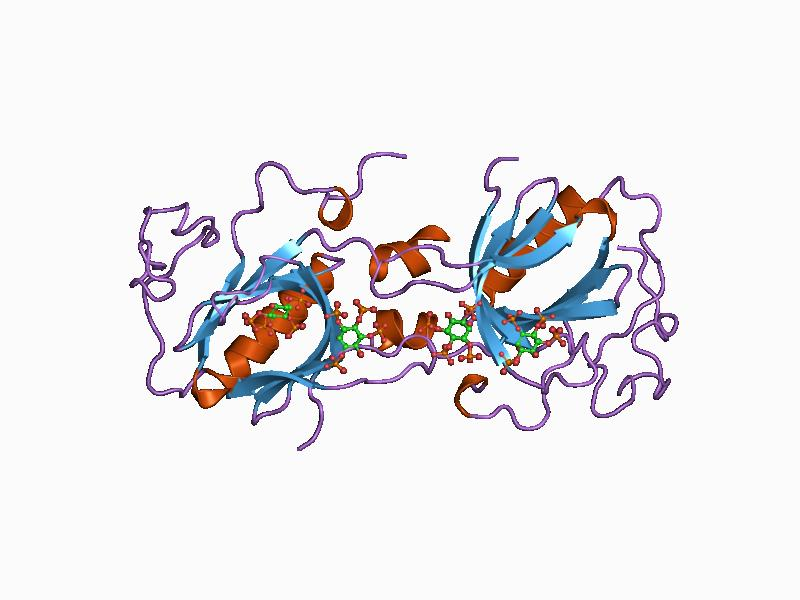
- ph domain and btk motif from bruton's tyrosine kinase mutant e41k in complex with ins(1,3,4,5)p4

Identifiers
- Symbol: BTK
- Pfam: PF00779
- InterPro: IPR001562
- SMART: BTK
- SCOP2: 1btk / SCOPe / SUPFAM
Available protein structures:
- Pfam: structures / ECOD
- PDB: RCSB PDB; PDBe; PDBj
- PDBsum: structure summary

In molecular biology, the Btk-type zinc finger or Btk motif (BM) is a conserved zinc-binding motif containing conserved cysteines and a histidine that is present in certain eukaryotic signalling proteins. The motif is named after Bruton's tyrosine kinase (Btk), an enzyme which is essential for B cell maturation in humans and mice. Btk is a member of the Tec family of protein tyrosine kinases (PTK). These kinases contain a conserved Tec homology (TH) domain between the N-terminal pleckstrin homology (PH) domain and the Src homology 3 (SH3) domain. The N-terminal of the TH domain is highly conserved and known as the Btf motif, while the C-terminal region of the TH domain contains a proline-rich region (PRR). The Btk motif contains a conserved His and three Cys residues that form a zinc finger (although these differ from known zinc finger topologies), while PRRs are commonly involved in protein-protein interactions, including interactions with G proteins. The TH domain may be of functional importance in various signalling pathways in different species. A complete TH domain, containing both the Btk and PRR regions, has not been found outside the Tec family; however, the Btk motif on its own does occur in other proteins, usually C-terminal to a PH domain (note that although a Btk motif always occurs C-terminal to a PH domain, not all PH domains are followed by a Btk motif).

The crystal structures of Btk show that the Btk-type zinc finger has a globular core, formed by a long loop which is held together by a zinc ion, and that the Btk motif is packed against the PH domain. The zinc-binding residues are a histidine and three cysteines, which are fully conserved in the Btk motif.

Proteins known to contain a Btk-type zinc finger include:

- Mammalian Bruton's tyrosine kinase (Btk), a protein tyrosine kinase involved in modulation of diverse cellular processes. Mutations affecting Btk are the cause of X-linked agammaglobulinemia (XLA) in humans and X-linked immunodeficiency in mice.
- Mammalian Tec, Bmx, and Itk proteins, which are tyrosine protein kinases of the Tec subfamily.
- Drosophila tyrosine-protein kinase Btk29A, which is required for the development of proper ring canals and of male genitalia and required for adult survival.
- Mammalian Ras GTPase-activating proteins (RasGAP), which regulate the activation of inactive GDP-bound Ras by converting GDP to GTP.
