= Tyrosine-protein kinase SYK =

Enzyme

SYK
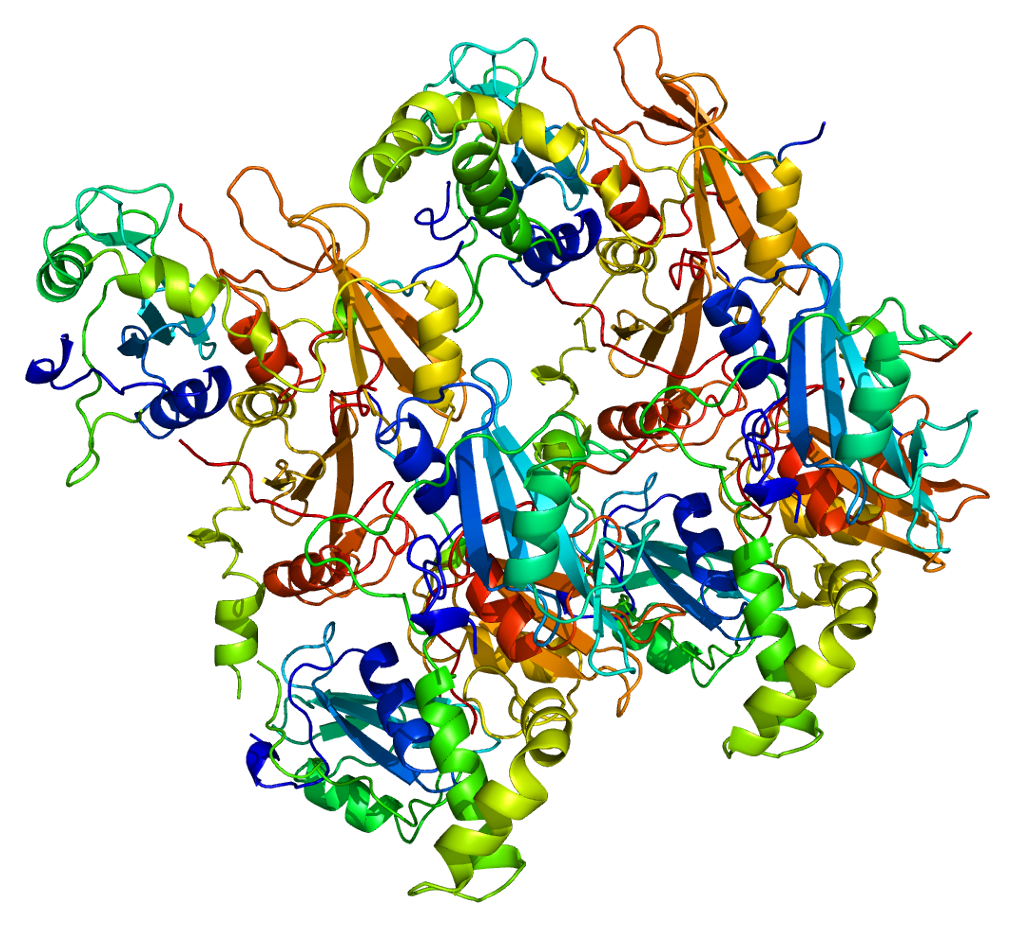

Identifiers
- Aliases: SYK, p72-Syk, spleen tyrosine kinase, spleen associated tyrosine kinase, IMD82
- External IDs: OMIM: 600085; MGI: 99515; GeneCards: SYK
Available structures
PDB	Ortholog search: PDBe RCSB
PDB	List of PDB id codes 1A81, 1CSY, 1CSZ, 1XBA, 1XBB, 1XBC, 3BUW, 3EMG, 3FQE, 3FQH, 3FQS, 3SRV, 3TUB, 3TUC, 3TUD, 3VF8, 3VF9, 4DFL, 4DFN, 4F4P, 4FL1, 4FL2, 4FL3, 4FYN, 4FYO, 4FZ6, 4FZ7, 4GFG, 4I0R, 4I0S, 4I0T, 4PUZ, 4PV0, 4PX6, 4RX7, 4RX8, 4RX9, 5CXH, 5CXZ, 5CY3, 4XG6, 4XG2, 4XG3, 4XG8, 4XG7, 4YJR, 4YJP, 5C27, 4RSS, 4XG4, 5C26, 4YJV, 4YJO, 4WNM, 4YJT, 4YJU, 4YJS, 4XG9, 5GHV
Enzyme activity
EC #	BRENDA	ExPASy	KEGG	MetaCyc
2.7.10.2	↗	↗	↗	↗

Gene location (Human)
Chr.	Chromosome 9 (human)
Band	9q22.2	Start	90,801,787 bp
Band	9q22.2	End	90,898,549 bp

Gene location (Mouse)
Chr.	Chromosome 13 (mouse)
Band	13 A5|13 27.41 cM	Start	52,737,209 bp
Band	13 A5|13 27.41 cM	End	52,802,828 bp
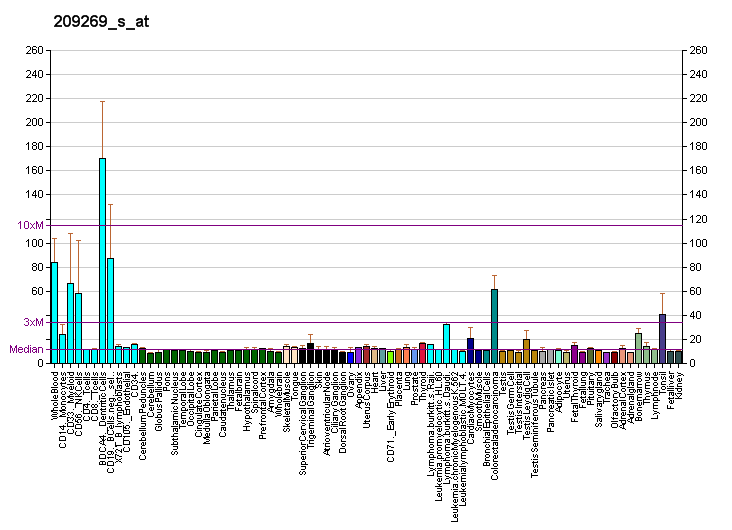

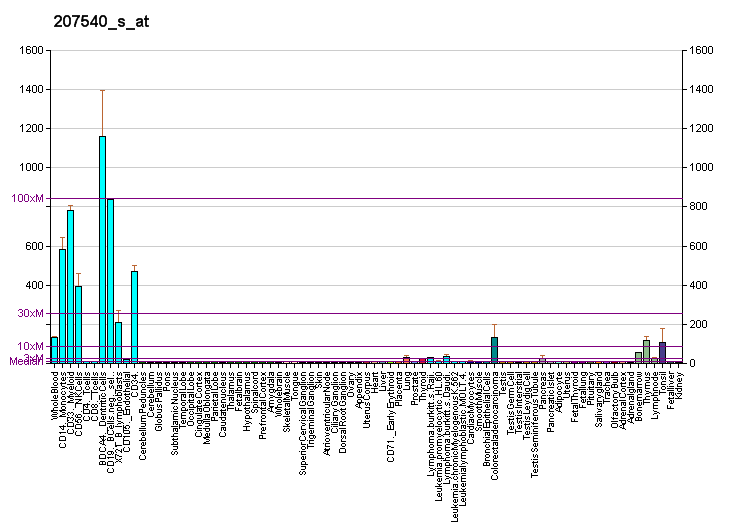
RNA expression pattern
Bgee	Human / Mouse (ortholog); Top expressed in: monocyte; granulocyte; blood; epithelium of nasopharynx; bone marrow cell; appendix; trabecular bone; lymph node; spleen; jejunal mucosa / Top expressed in: granulocyte; spleen; tibiofemoral joint; blood; mesenteric lymph nodes; stroma of bone marrow; Ileal epithelium; ankle joint; subcutaneous adipose tissue; lumbar subsegment of spinal cord; More reference expression data
BioGPS	More reference expression data
Gene ontology
Molecular function	kinase activity; ATP binding; protein kinase activity; non-membrane spanning protein tyrosine kinase activity; protein serine/threonine kinase activity; transferase activity; integrin binding; protein binding; protein tyrosine kinase activity; protein kinase binding; nucleotide binding; phosphatase binding; Toll-like receptor binding; phosphotyrosine residue binding; SH2 domain binding; interleukin-15 receptor binding
Cellular component	cytoplasm; cytosol; membrane; extrinsic component of cytoplasmic side of plasma membrane; nucleus; early phagosome; B cell receptor complex; plasma membrane; T cell receptor complex; protein-containing complex
Biological process	leukocyte cell-cell adhesion; adaptive immune response; positive regulation of receptor internalization; neutrophil activation involved in immune response; platelet activation; Fc-epsilon receptor signaling pathway; protein phosphorylation; cell surface receptor signaling pathway; regulation of DNA-binding transcription factor activity; serotonin secretion; angiogenesis; animal organ morphogenesis; positive regulation of cell adhesion mediated by integrin; cell population proliferation; regulation of platelet aggregation; B cell receptor signaling pathway; positive regulation of calcium-mediated signaling; blood vessel morphogenesis; Fc-gamma receptor signaling pathway involved in phagocytosis; transmembrane receptor protein tyrosine kinase signaling pathway; regulation of tumor necrosis factor-mediated signaling pathway; serotonin secretion by platelet; cellular response to low-density lipoprotein particle stimulus; stimulatory C-type lectin receptor signaling pathway; lymph vessel development; neutrophil chemotaxis; macrophage activation involved in immune response; defense response to bacterium; positive regulation of alpha-beta T cell proliferation; regulation of ERK1 and ERK2 cascade; positive regulation of peptidyl-tyrosine phosphorylation; protein autophosphorylation; leukotriene biosynthetic process; viral process; positive regulation of alpha-beta T cell differentiation; cellular response to molecule of fungal origin; regulation of neutrophil degranulation; phosphorylation; immune system process; positive regulation of B cell differentiation; beta selection; leukocyte activation involved in immune response; peptidyl-tyrosine autophosphorylation; integrin-mediated signaling pathway; regulation of superoxide anion generation; enzyme linked receptor protein signaling pathway; intracellular signal transduction; receptor internalization; positive regulation of bone resorption; positive regulation of mast cell degranulation; regulation of arachidonic acid secretion; peptidyl-serine phosphorylation; peptidyl-tyrosine phosphorylation; regulation of phagocytosis; regulation of platelet activation; positive regulation of gamma-delta T cell differentiation; positive regulation of type I interferon production; inflammatory response; innate immune response; collagen-activated tyrosine kinase receptor signaling pathway; positive regulation of peptidyl-tyrosine autophosphorylation; protein import into nucleus; positive regulation of interleukin-4 production; interleukin-2-mediated signaling pathway; interleukin-3-mediated signaling pathway; positive regulation of cold-induced thermogenesis; positive regulation of protein-containing complex assembly; positive regulation of cysteine-type endopeptidase activity involved in apoptotic process
Sources:Amigo / QuickGO
Orthologs
Databases	NCBI: entry; OMA: entry
Species	Human	Mouse
Entrez	6850	20963
Ensembl	ENSG00000165025	ENSMUSG00000021457
UniProt	P43405	P48025
RefSeq (mRNA)	NM_001135052; NM_001174167; NM_001174168; NM_003177	NM_001198977; NM_011518
RefSeq (protein)	NP_001128524; NP_001167638; NP_001167639; NP_003168	NP_001185906; NP_035648
Location (UCSC)	Chr 9: 90.8 – 90.9 Mb	Chr 13: 52.74 – 52.8 Mb
PubMed search
- Wikidata
View/Edit Human	View/Edit Mouse

Tyrosine-protein kinase SYK, also known as spleen tyrosine kinase, is an enzyme which in humans is encoded by the SYK gene.

== Function ==
SYK, along with ZAP70, is a member of the Syk family of tyrosine kinases. These cytoplasmic non-receptor tyrosine kinases share a characteristic dual SH2 domain separated by a linker domain. However, activation of SYK relies less on phosphorylation by Src family kinases than ZAP70. SYK and ZAP70 share a common evolutionary origin and split from a common ancestor in the jawed vertebrates.

While Syk and ZAP70 are primarily expressed in hematopoietic tissues, a variety of tissues express Syk. Within B and T cells, respectively, Syk and ZAP70 transmit signals from the B-cell receptor and T-cell receptor. Syk plays a similar role in transmitting signals from a variety of cell surface receptors including CD74, Fc receptor, and integrins.

=== Function during development ===
Mice that lack Syk completely (Syk^{−/−}, Syk-knockout) die during embryonic development around midgestation. They show severe defects in the development of the lymphatic system. Normally, the lymphatic system and the blood system are strictly separated from each other. However, in Syk deficient mice the lymphatics and the blood vessels form abnormal shunts, leading to leakage of blood into the lymphatic system. The reason for this phenotype was identified by a genetic fate mapping approach, showing that Syk is expressed in myeloid cells which orchestrate the proper separation of lymphatics and blood system during embryogenesis and beyond. Thus, Syk is an essential regulator of the lymphatic system development in mice.

== Clinical significance ==
Abnormal function of Syk has been implicated in several instances of hematopoietic malignancies including translocations involving Itk and Tel. Constitutive Syk activity can transform B cells. Several transforming viruses contain "Immunoreceptor Tyrosine Activation Motifs" (ITAMs) which lead to activation of Syk including Epstein–Barr virus, bovine leukemia virus, and mouse mammary tumor virus.

=== SYK inhibition ===
Given the central role of SYK in transmission of activating signals within B-cells, a suppression of this tyrosine kinase might aid in the treatment of B cell malignancies and autoimmune diseases.

Syk inhibition has been proposed as a therapy for both lymphoma and chronic lymphocytic leukemia. Syk inhibitors are in clinical development, including cerdulatinib and entospletinib. Other inhibitors of B-cell receptor (BCR) signaling including ibrutinib (PCI-32765) which inhibits BTK, and idelalisib (PI3K inhibitor - CAL-101 / GS-1101) showed activity in the diseases as well.

The orally active SYK inhibitor fostamatinib (R788) in the treatment of immune thrombocytopenia.

The Syk inhibitor nilvadipine has been shown to regulate amyloid-β production and Tau phosphorylation and hence has been proposed as a treatment for Alzheimer's disease and has entered phase III clinical trials.

The Syk inhibitor sovleplenib is currently in phase 3 trials for warm antibody autoimmune hemolytic anemia (WAIHA).

=== Epithelial malignancies ===
The role of Syk in epithelial malignancies is controversial. Several authors have suggested that abnormal Syk function facilitates transformation in nasopharyngeal carcinoma and head and neck cancer while other authors have suggested a tumor suppressor role in breast and gastric cancer.

Without Syk, the protein it makes, and genetic disruption in a panel of 55 genes thought also to be controlled by Syk, breast ductal carcinoma in situ (breast DCIS, which can become invasive), it is believed that the cancer has a markedly increased tendency to invade and metastasize.

== Interactions ==
Syk has been shown to interact with:

- Cbl gene
- CRKL,
- FCGR2A,
- FYN,
- Grb2,
- Lck,
- LYN,
- PTK2,
- PTPN6, and
- VAV1.
