= CD79B =

Protein-coding gene in humans

Identifiers
- Aliases: CD79B, AGM6, B29, IGB, CD79b molecule, Igbeta
- External IDs: OMIM: 147245; MGI: 96431; GeneCards: CD79B
Available structures
PDB	Ortholog search: PDBe RCSB
PDB	List of PDB id codes 3KG5

Gene location (Human)
Chr.	Chromosome 17 (human)
Band	17q23.3	Start	63,928,740 bp
Band	17q23.3	End	63,932,336 bp

Gene location (Mouse)
Chr.	Chromosome 11 (mouse)
Band	11 E1|11 68.89 cM	Start	106,202,167 bp
Band	11 E1|11 68.89 cM	End	106,205,588 bp
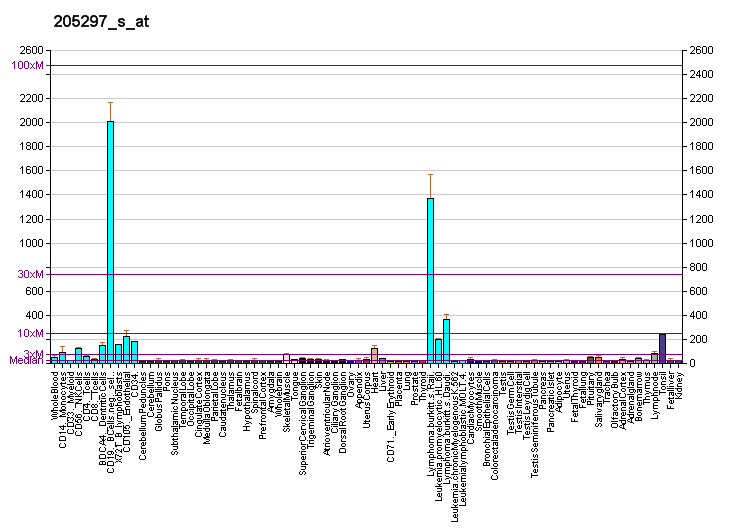
RNA expression pattern
Bgee	Human / Mouse (ortholog); Top expressed in: granulocyte; spleen; lymph node; appendix; apex of heart; blood; monocyte; gonad; bone marrow; anterior pituitary / Top expressed in: mesenteric lymph nodes; spleen; tibiofemoral joint; blood; bone marrow; granulocyte; submandibular gland; thymus; subcutaneous adipose tissue; tunica adventitia of aorta; More reference expression data
BioGPS	More reference expression data
Gene ontology
Molecular function	protein binding; transmembrane signaling receptor activity; protein homodimerization activity; identical protein binding
Cellular component	integral component of membrane; plasma membrane; Golgi apparatus; integral component of plasma membrane; extracellular exosome; membrane; nucleoplasm; external side of plasma membrane; B cell receptor complex; cytoplasm; cytosol
Biological process	cell surface receptor signaling pathway; adaptive immune response; immune response; signal transduction; immune system process; B cell differentiation; B cell receptor signaling pathway; protein homooligomerization; response to bacterium
Sources:Amigo / QuickGO
Orthologs
Databases	NCBI: entry; OMA: entry
Species	Human	Mouse
Entrez	974	15985
Ensembl	ENSG00000007312	ENSMUSG00000040592
UniProt	P40259	P15530
RefSeq (mRNA)	NM_000626; NM_001039933; NM_021602; NM_001329050	NM_008339; NM_001313939
RefSeq (protein)	NP_000617; NP_001035022; NP_001315979; NP_067613	NP_001300868; NP_032365
Location (UCSC)	Chr 17: 63.93 – 63.93 Mb	Chr 11: 106.2 – 106.21 Mb
PubMed search
- Wikidata
View/Edit Human	View/Edit Mouse

CD79b molecule, immunoglobulin-associated beta, also known as CD79B (Cluster of Differentiation 79B), is a human gene.

It is associated with agammaglobulinemia-6.

The B lymphocyte antigen receptor is a multimeric complex that includes the antigen-specific component, surface immunoglobulin (Ig). Surface Ig non-covalently associates with two other proteins, Ig-alpha and Ig-beta, which are necessary for expression and function of the B-cell antigen receptor. This gene encodes the Ig-beta protein of the B-cell antigen component. Alternatively spliced transcript variants encoding different isoforms have been described.

== See also ==
- Cluster of differentiation
