= Swiss Cancer Centre =

Alliance of academic and clinical institutions

Swiss Cancer Centre - Leman
- Centre suisse du cancer - Arc lémanique
- Established: 2016
- Field of research: Oncology
- Director: Prof. George Coukos, Prof. Elisa Oricchio, Prof. Olivier Michielin
- Location: Rue du Bugnon; 1011 Lausanne, Lausanne, Switzerland; 46.525305°N 6.640883°E
- Affiliations: CHUV, UNIL, EPFL, University Hospitals of Geneva (HUG) and University of Geneva (UNIGE).
- Website: sccl.ch

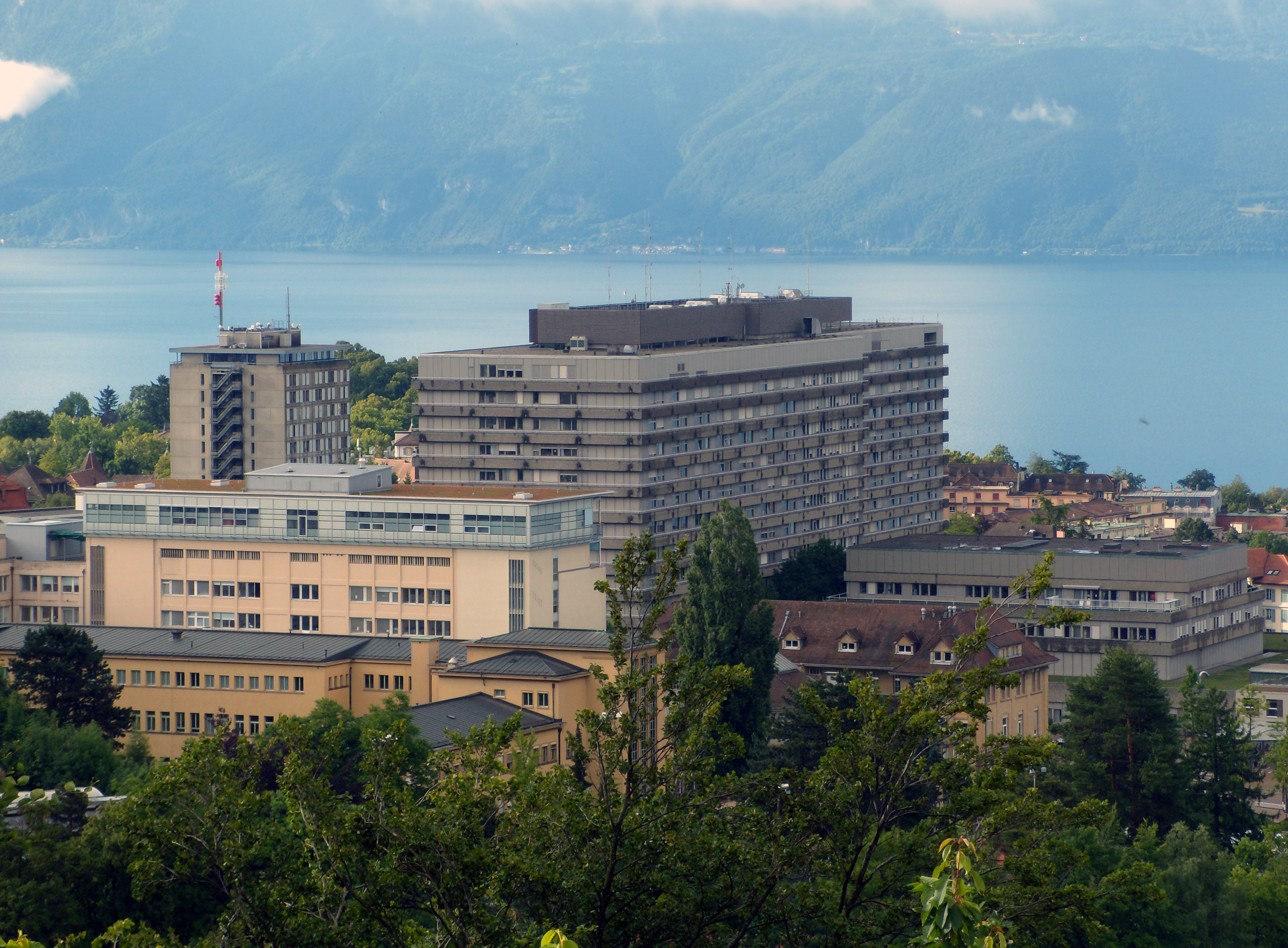
The Swiss Cancer Centre will be located in the west of the campus of the University Hospital of Lausanne (CHUV).

The Swiss Cancer Centre - Leman (SCCL) is an alliance against cancer forged between several academic and clinical institutions: the University Hospital of Lausanne (CHUV), the University Hospitals of Geneva (HUG), the University of Lausanne, the University of Geneva and the Swiss Federal Institute of Technology Lausanne (EPFL), as well as privileged partners (see below).

This alliance brings together, under a united and regional identity, all the specialists involved in the path from bench to bedside. Focusing their efforts on emerging fields within oncology, the partner institutions intend to develop innovative strategies such as immunotherapy and precision oncology to achieve personalized and predictive medical strategies that will ultimately revolutionize patient care.

The SCCL conducts its research in a network of laboratories located within its constituent institutions.

== Executive committee ==
The SCCL Executive Committee is composed of the senior directors in oncology of its partner institutions:

- Professor George Coukos, Head of the Department of oncology UNIL CHUV
- Professor Elisa Oricchio, Director of the Swiss Institute for Experimental Cancer Research (ISREC) at EPFL
- Professor Olivier Michielin, Head of the Department of oncology HUG UNIGE

== The AGORA building ==
The Agora, the flagship building of the Swiss Cancer Centre - Leman (SCCL), embodies and puts into the practice the central vision of the SCCL has for cancer science and medicine. A FLASH radiotherapy device for treatment of cancers resistant to conventional treatments is developed together with CERN and THERYQ (Alcen Group) and will be installed at the CHUV. The first clinical trials are planned for 2025.

== Other ==
In 2016, the University Hospital of Lausanne inaugurated a cell production laboratory for cancer immunotherapy on the Biopôle campus (Épalinges).

== See also ==
- Lausanne campus
