= Lausanne campus =

Academic district in Lausanne, Switzerland

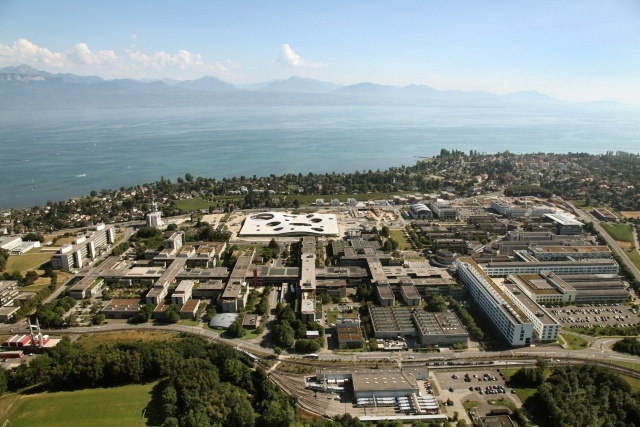
The EPFL, on the west part of the Lausanne campus, on the shore of Lake Geneva

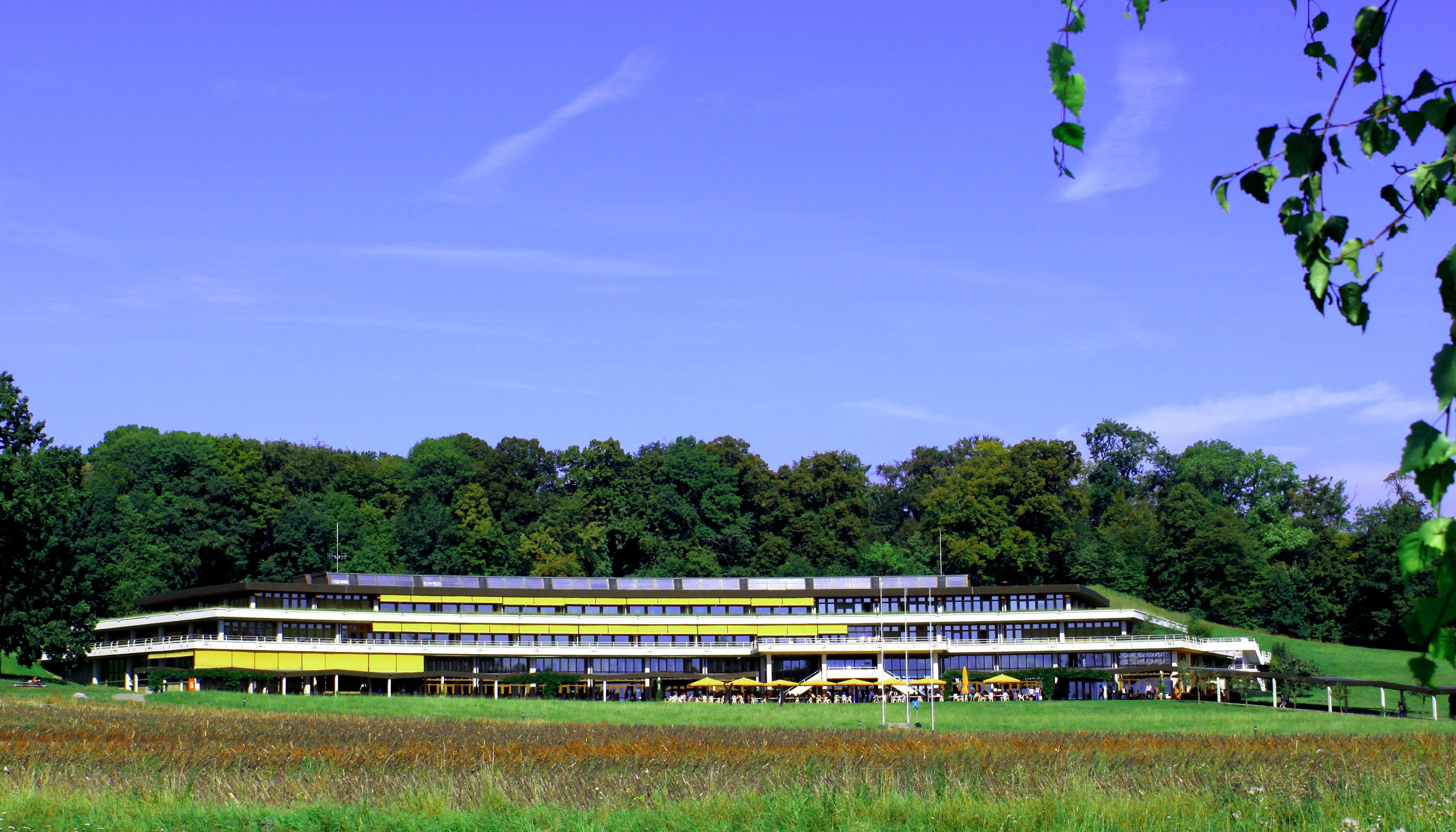
A building of the University of Lausanne, towards the east of the Lausanne campus

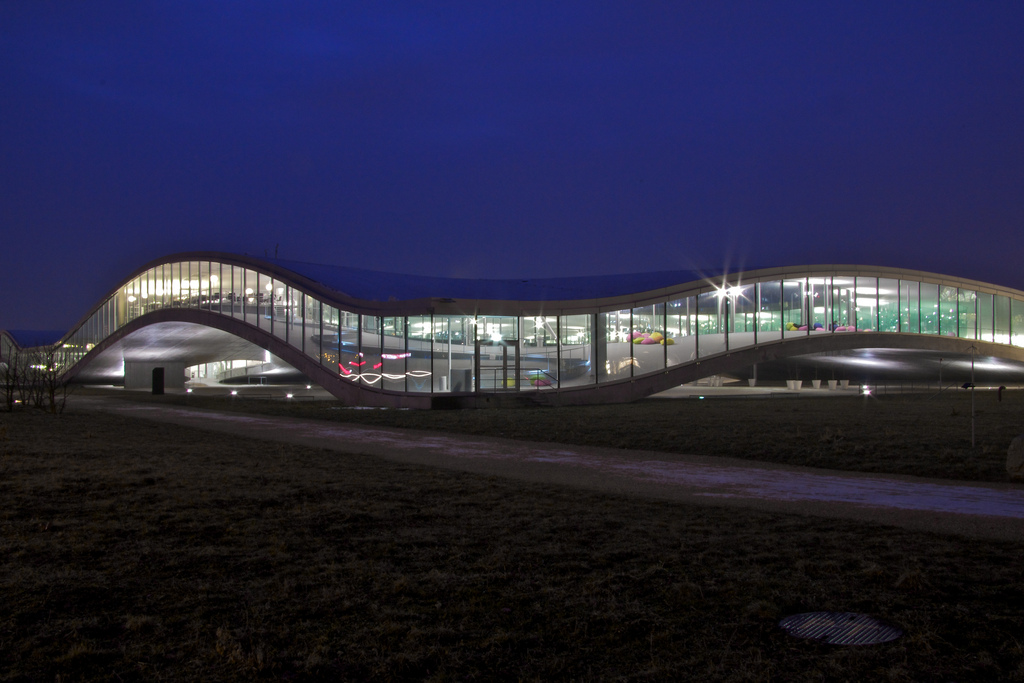
The main library of the EPFL, the Learning Center

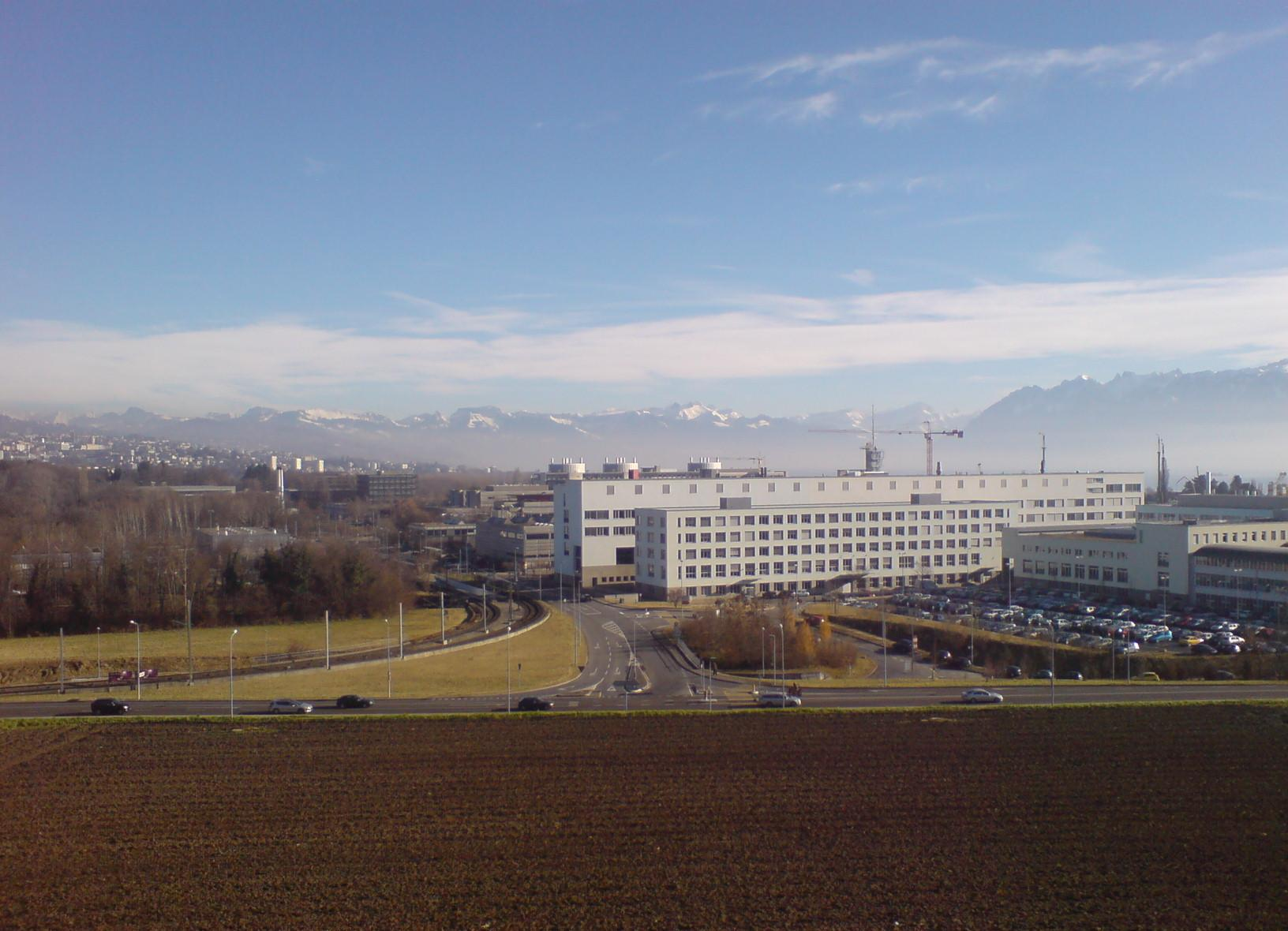
The campus, seen from the west, before the construction of the Swiss Tech Convention Center

Location at Lausanne in Switzerland

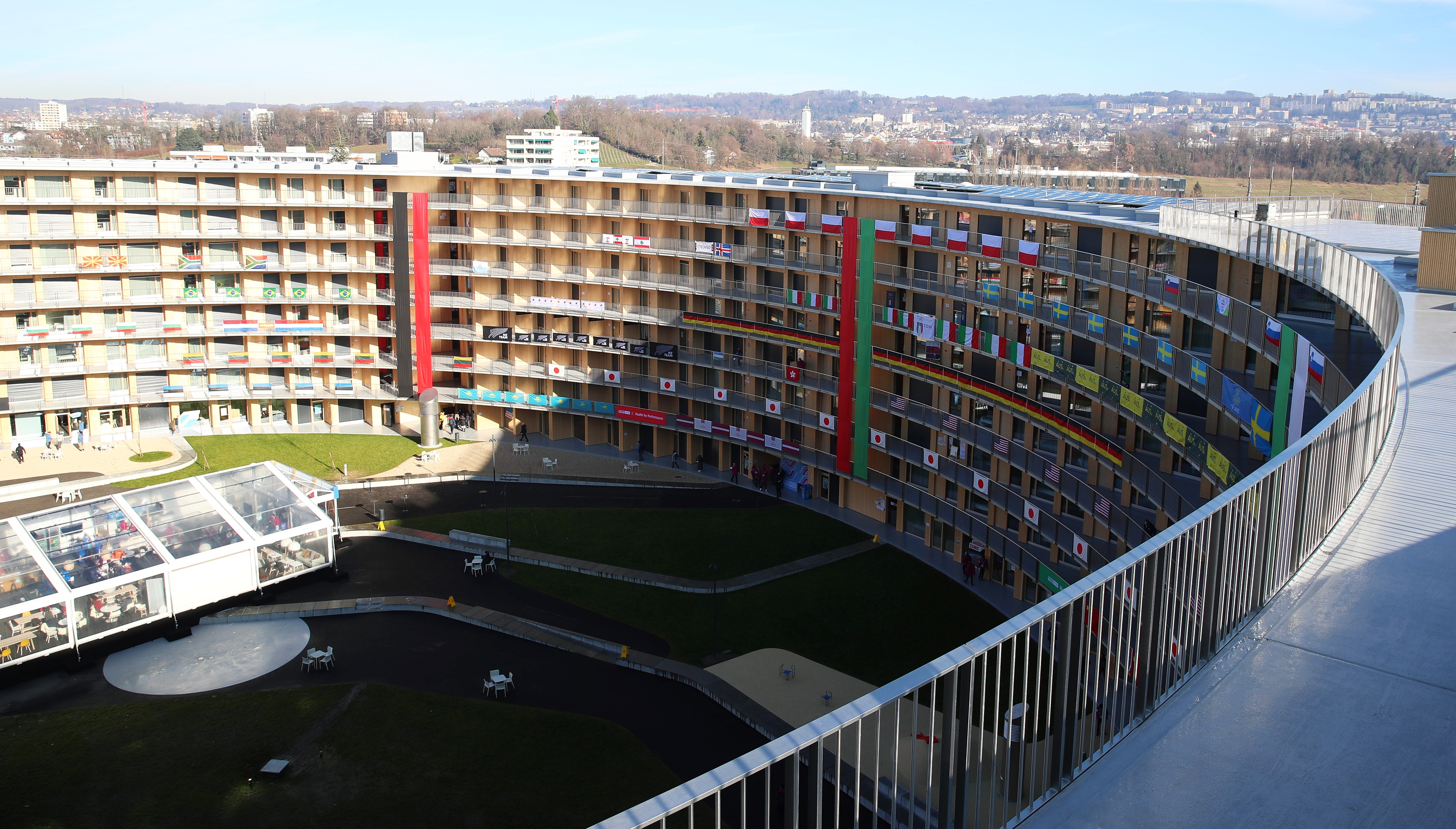
The circular "Vortex" building which housed the Olympic village of the 2020 Winter Youth Olympics and is now a student residence

The Lausanne campus or Dorigny university campus (French: campus lausannois or campus de Dorigny) is a large area in Switzerland where the University of Lausanne (UNIL), the École polytechnique fédérale de Lausanne (EPFL) and several other institutions are located. It is in Dorigny, towards the west of Lausanne, on the shores of Lake Geneva. The site is about 2.2 kilometres wide and 31,000 people study and work there.

It is served by Lausanne Metro line 1, from four consecutive stations (UNIL-Chamberonne, UNIL-Mouline, UNIL-Sorge and EPFL), and possesses a bicycle sharing system.

== History ==
Aerial view of what was to become the Lausanne campus (1960)

In 1946, the citizens of Lausanne voted against a massive airport project ("aéroport vaudois Lausanne-Écublens") on the site. In 1963, the Canton of Vaud bought the property at Dorigny. At the time, the University of Lausanne had more than forty locations in Lausanne.

The first building to open on the new campus was the Amphipôle, in October 1970. As of 2013, the campus comprised about sixty buildings. The chief architect of the UNIL campus was Guido Cocchi (1928--2010).

EPFL was officially founded on 1 January 1969 following the passage of the "Loi sur les Ecoles Polytechniques Fédérales"/"Law regarding Federal Polytechnic Institutes" in 1968. (Previously, the university was known as Ecole polytechnique de l'Université de Lausanne.) At that time, EPFL started the process of moving its campus from Lausanne to the new site at Ecublens-Dorigny. The first buildings were inaugurated in 1978 and the last to finish the move was the architecture department in 2001.

The campus is mainly located in the municipality of Écublens, but parts of it are in Chavannes-près-Renens and Saint-Sulpice. The campus has its own postal code: 1015 Lausanne.

The campus also features the Napoleon Oak, a magnificent tree which has stood at its current location since 1800. The tree has been subject to extensive whole genome sequencing.

=== Future developments ===
The Radio télévision suisse announced its plans to move its Lausanne radio offices to a new building on the campus in 2013. Construction started in 2020 and the move is projected to be completed by 2026.

== Institutions ==
- University of Lausanne (UNIL)
  - HEC Lausanne
  - Cantonal and University Library of Lausanne (BCU)
  - "La Grange de Dorigny", the theatre of the UNIL
  - Swiss Graduate School of Public Administration (IDHEAP)
- École polytechnique fédérale de Lausanne (EPFL)
  - Swiss Institute for Experimental Cancer Research (ISREC)
  - Tokamak à configuration variable (research fusion reactor)
  - Swiss Tech Convention Center
  - Learning Centre
  - EPFL Innovation Park (hosting 170 companies), part of the Swiss Innovation Park
    - Frontiers Media
    - Nestlé Institute of Health Sciences
    - Merck Institute for Pharmacometrics
  - Musée Bolo
  - Archizoom
- UNIL-EPFL common structures:
  - Language Centre
  - Sport Centre
  - Lausanne University Clubs (LUCs) of badminton, football, American football, rugby, unihockey and volleyball
  - Formation continue (continuing education)
  - Centre universitaire lausannois en finance
  - Centre for Advanced Surface Analysis (Centre de compétence en analyse de surface des matériaux)
  - Centre of Biotechnology
  - Human Brain Project
  - Fréquence banane (campus radio)
- Other institutions:
  - Jean Monnet Foundation for Europe
  - Swiss Institute of Comparative Law
  - Swiss Centre of Expertise in the Social Sciences
  - Swiss Institute of Bioinformatics (SIB)
  - Centre for Biomedical Imaging (CIBM)
  - Swiss School of Archaeology in Greece
  - Presses polytechniques et universitaires romandes
  - Archives of the Canton of Vaud
  - International Academy of Sport Science and Technology (AISTS)
  - International University Sports Federation
  - "Vortex" building, hosting the Olympic village of the 2020 Winter Youth Olympics (will then become a student house)
- Planned:
  - Radio headquarters of the Radio télévision suisse (since 2025-2026)
  - University of Applied Health Sciences (HESAV, since 2025)

== Facilities ==
- Catering:
  - Numerous restaurants, cafeterias and food stalls
  - Bars ("Zelig" in the Géopolis and "Satellite" in the CM building)
- Shopping area "Les Arcades" (at the "EPFL" metro station) includes Migros, Denner and Holy Cow! Gourmet Burger Company.
- Other shops:
  - Bookshops ("Basta!" in the Anthropole and "La fontaine" in the Learning Centre)
  - University souvenir shops (of the UNIL in the Amphimax and of the EPFL in the Learning Centre)
  - Groceries ("L'épicentre" at the UNIL and "Le négoce" at the EPFL)
  - Banks (Banque cantonale vaudoise in the Internef and Credit Suisse in the Learning Centre)
  - Swiss Post office (at the Avenue Auguste Piccard)
  - Swiss Federal Railways ticket shop
  - Kiosks
- Accommodations next to the campus:
  - Some university halls of residence (Atrium, Ochettes and Triaudes) of the Fondation de maisons pour étudiants de Lausanne (FMEL)
  - Hotels (Starling Hotel, Swiss Tech Hotel) and motel (Motel des pierrettes)
- Others:
  - Day nurseries
  - Mobility Carsharing vehicles
  - Farmers' markets
  - Hairdresser
  - Organic farm (the "Ferme de Bassenges")

== Photographs ==
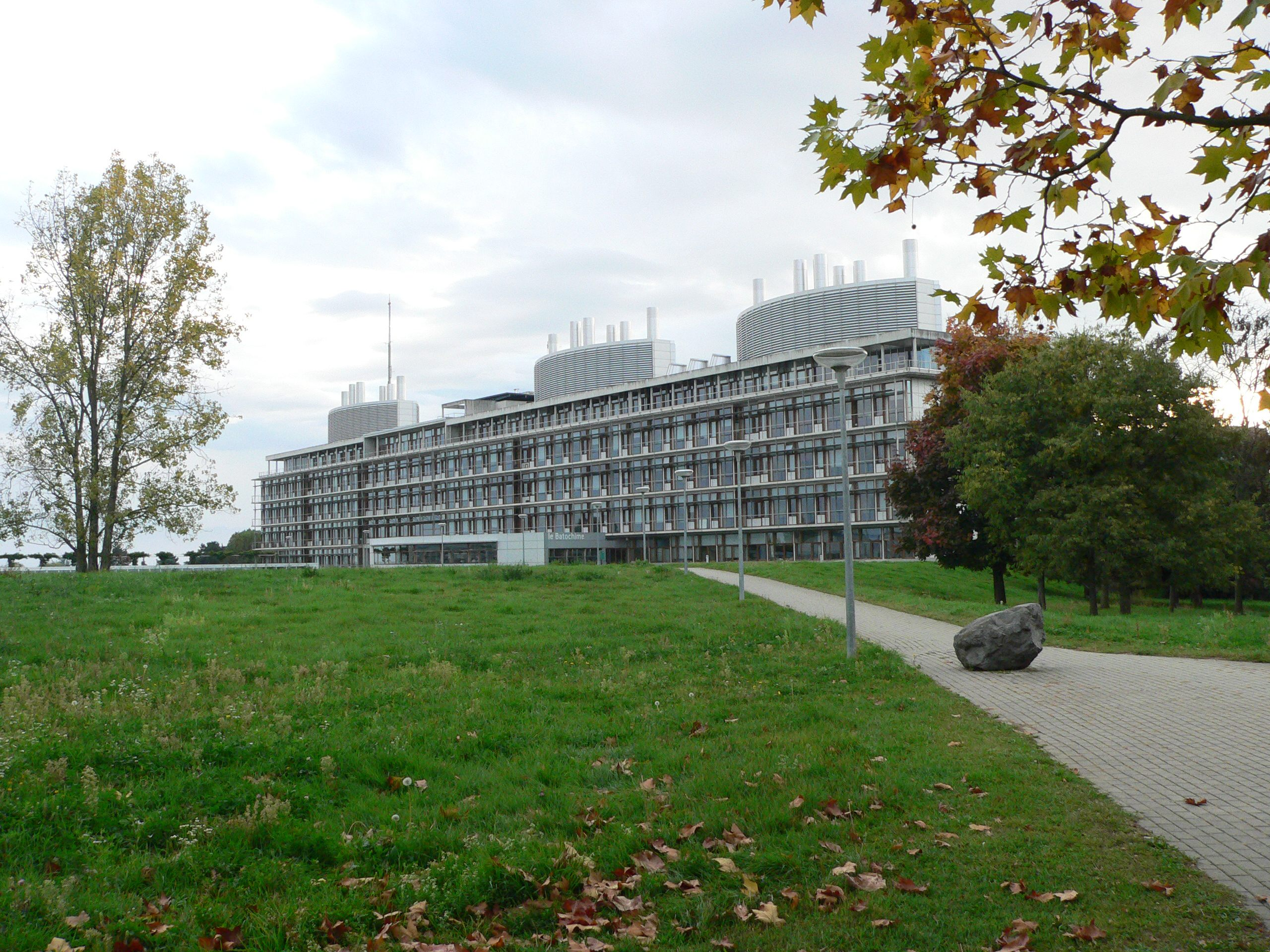
The Batochime building hosts groups from both the UNIL and the EPFL.

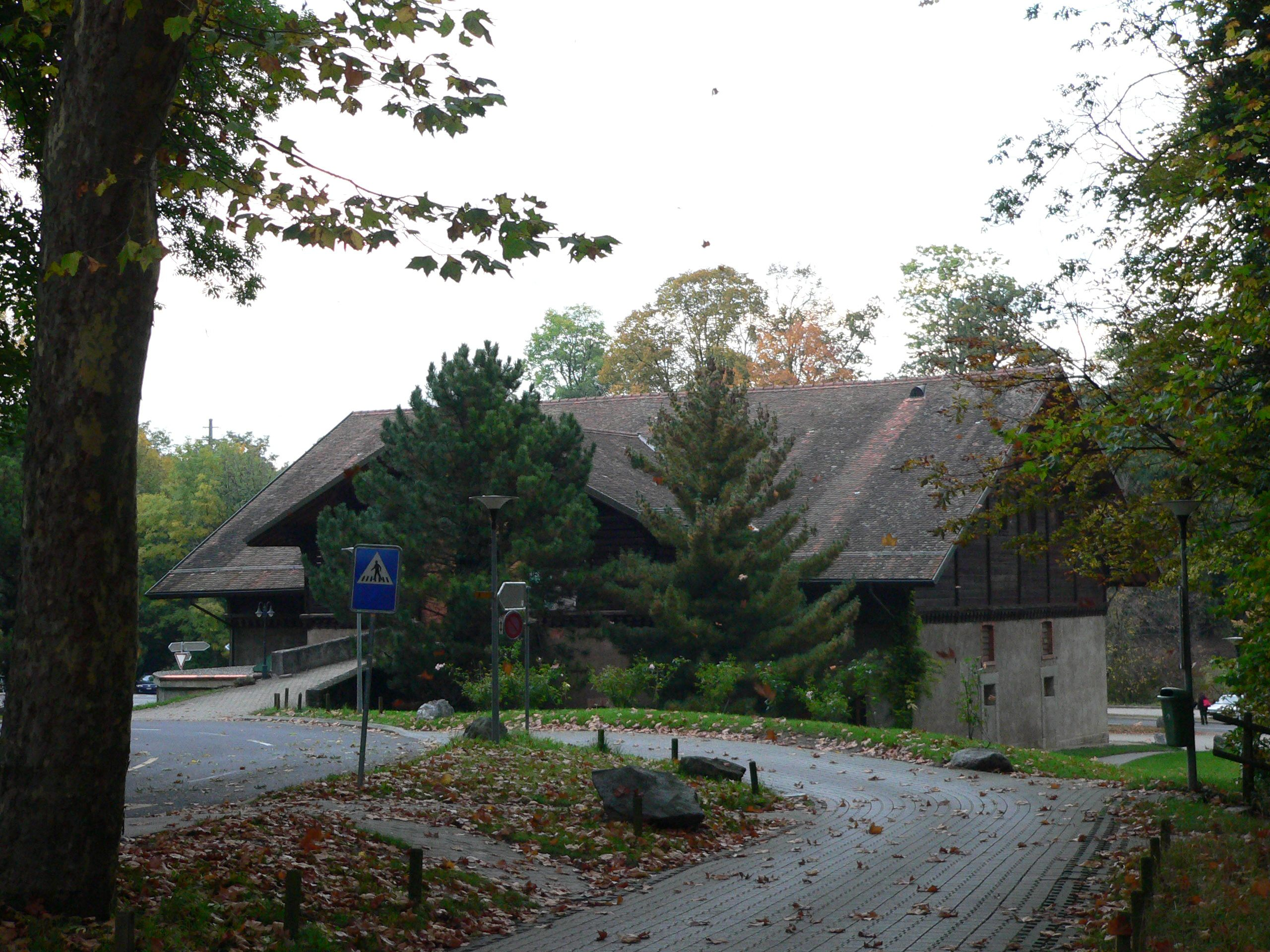
"La grange de Dorigny", the theatre of the UNIL

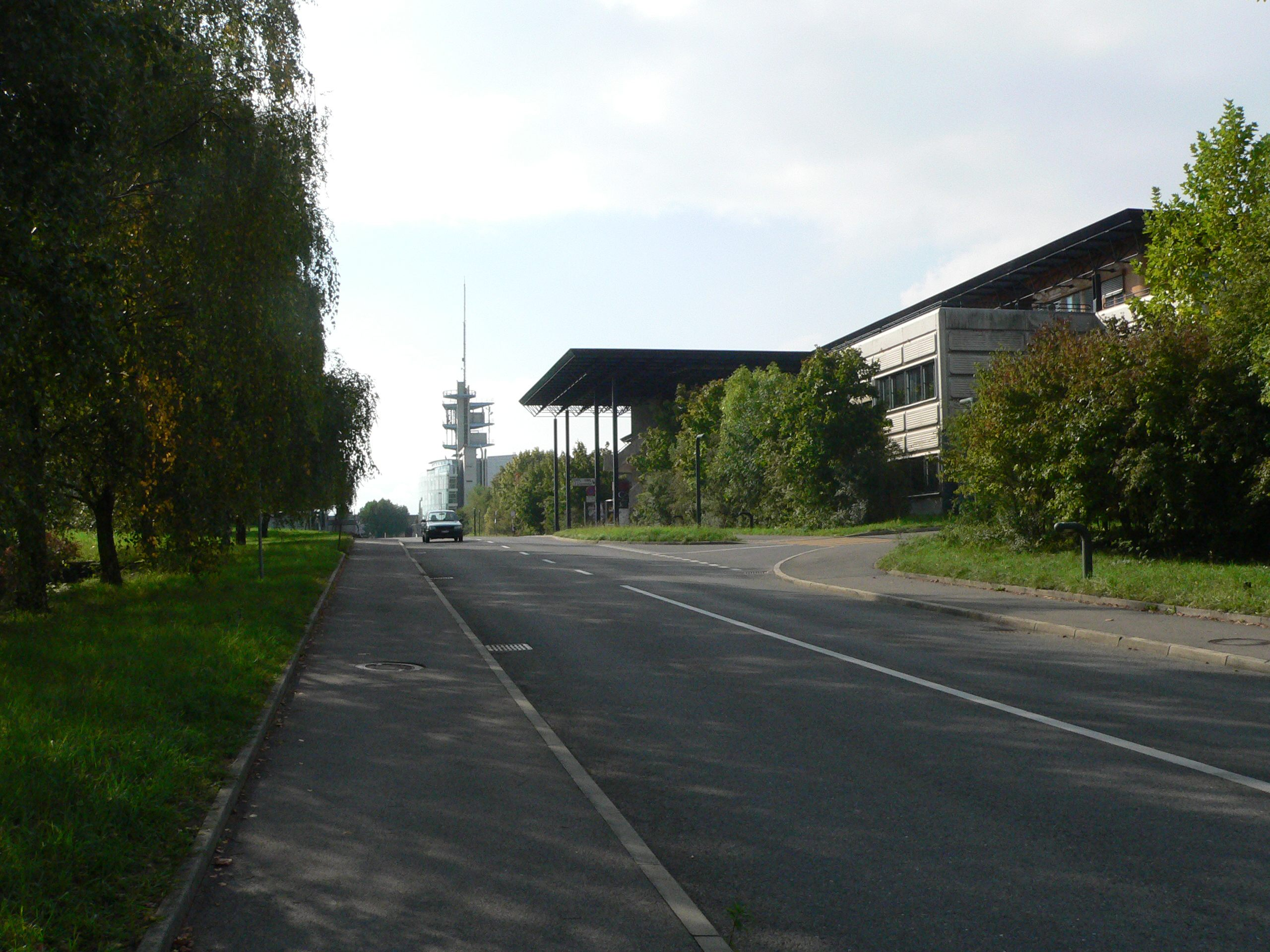
The Avenue Forel, between the UNIL and the EPFL

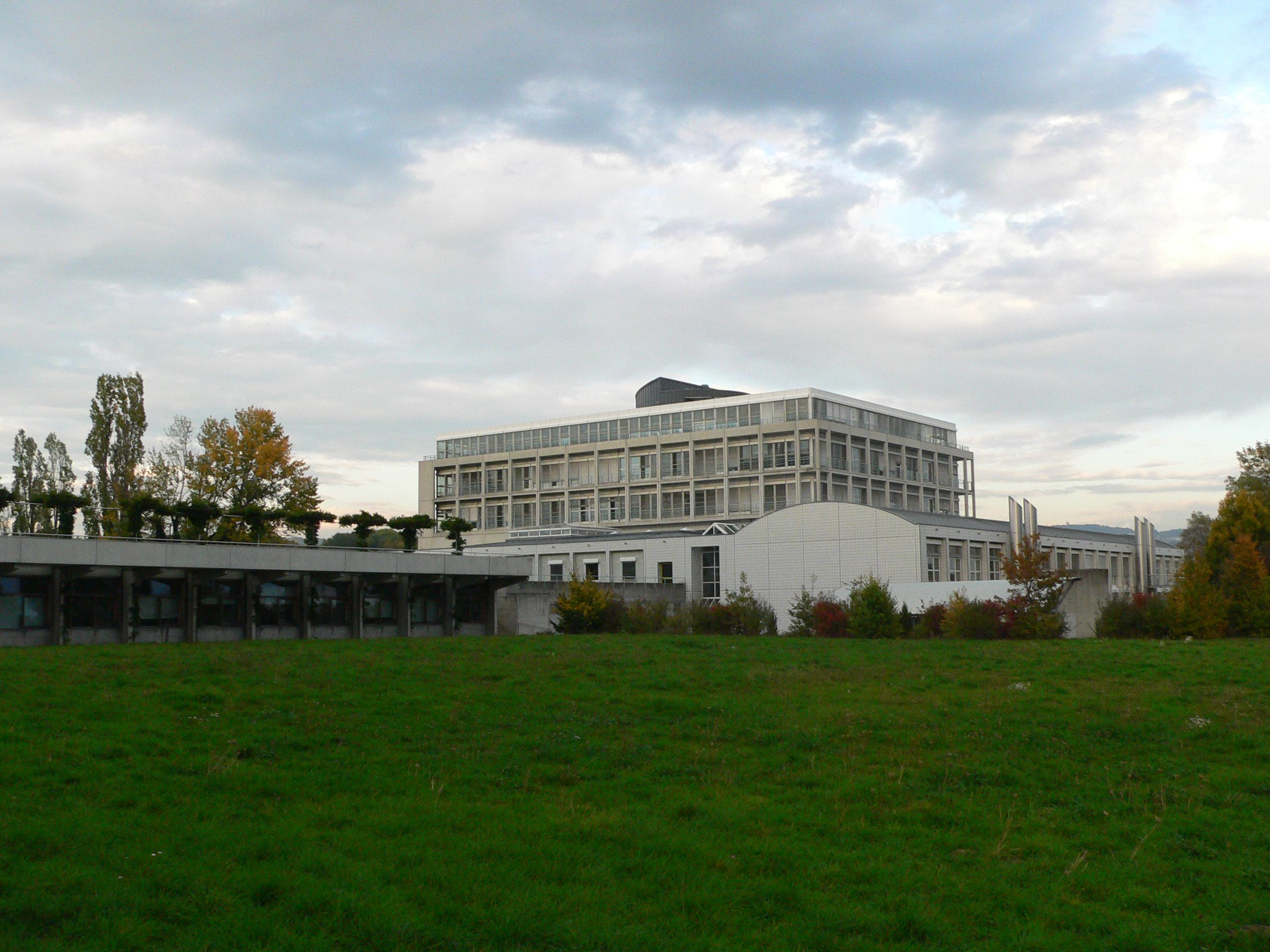
The Génopode building hosts the Center for Integrative Genomics of the UNIL and the central administration of the Swiss Institute of Bioinformatics.

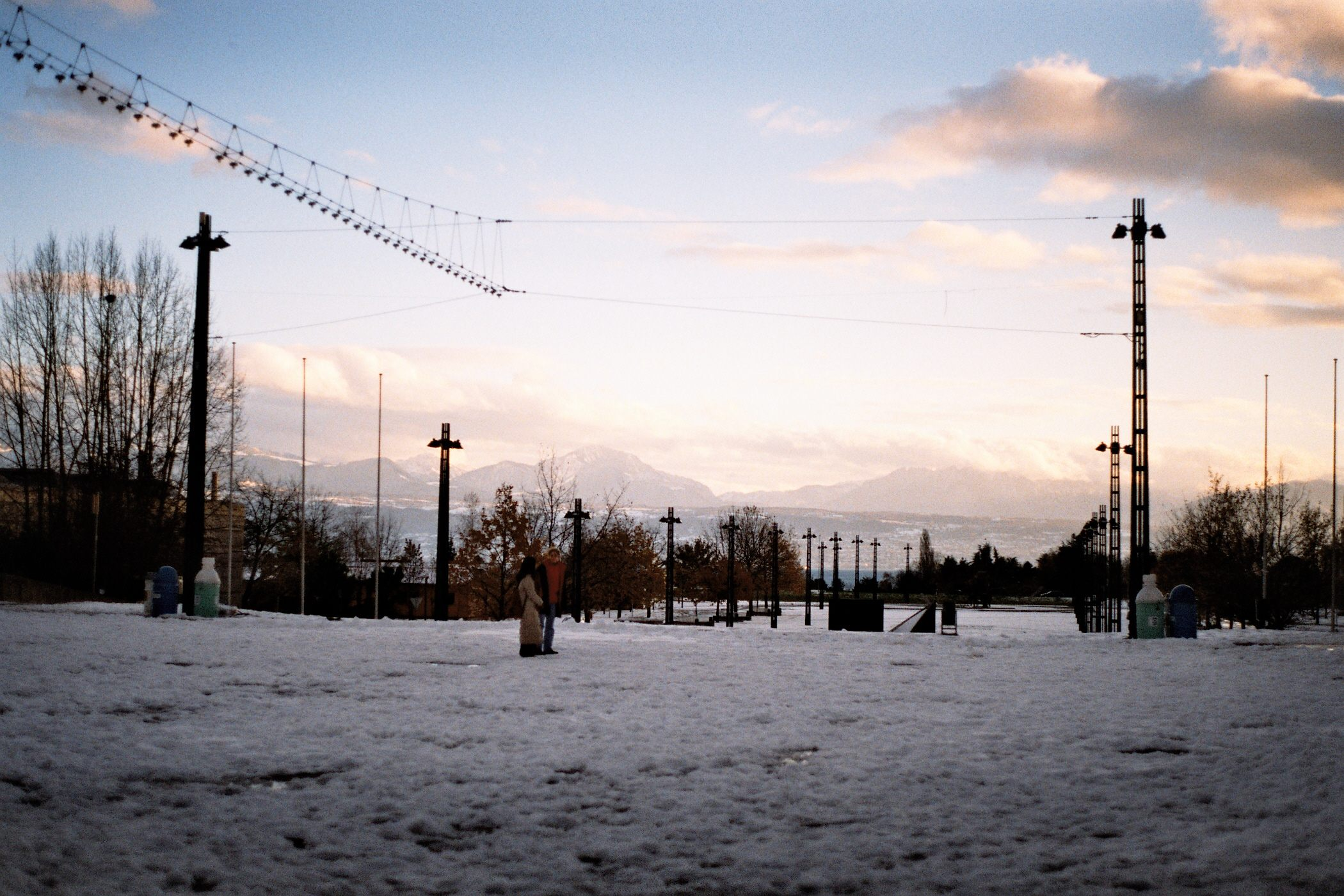
The EPFL esplanade and the Alps in winter

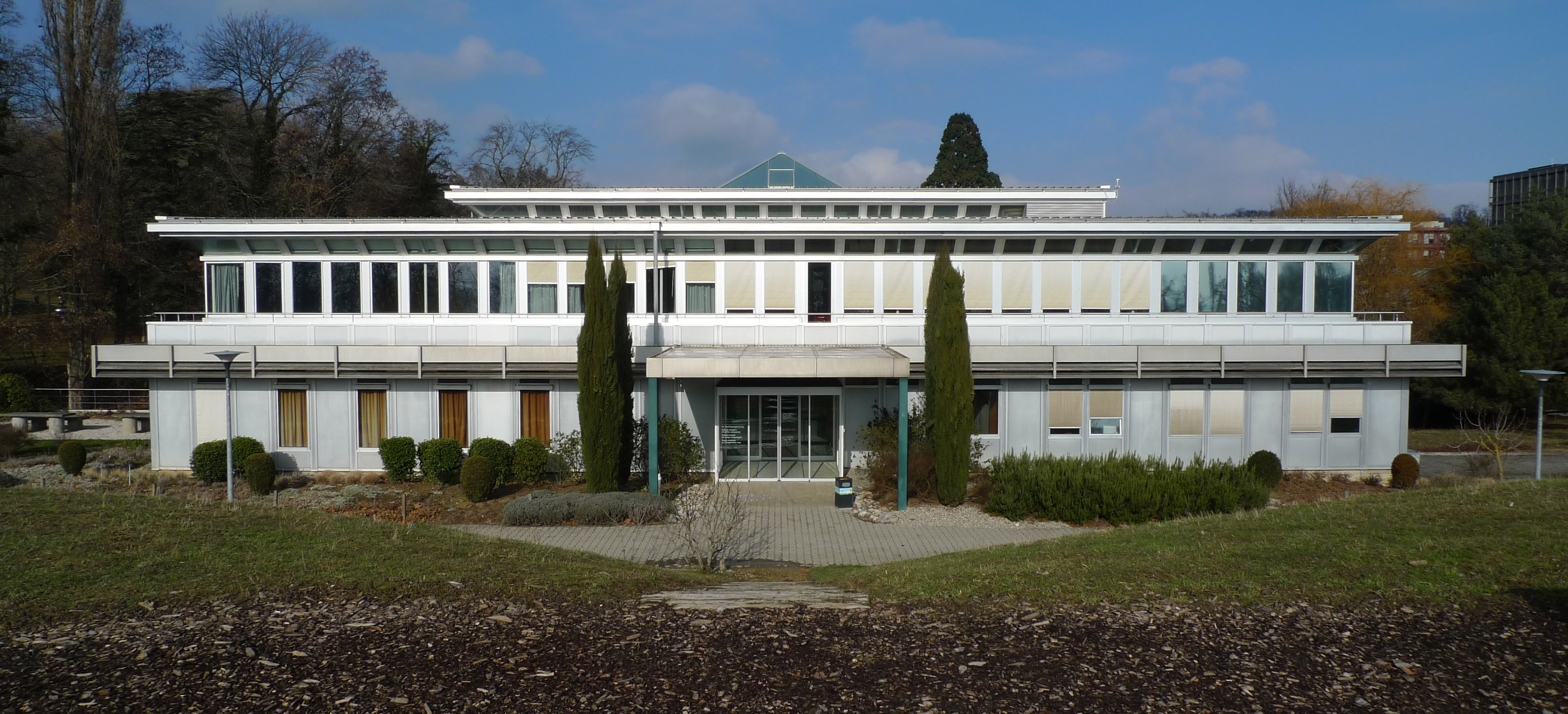
The Swiss Institute of Comparative Law

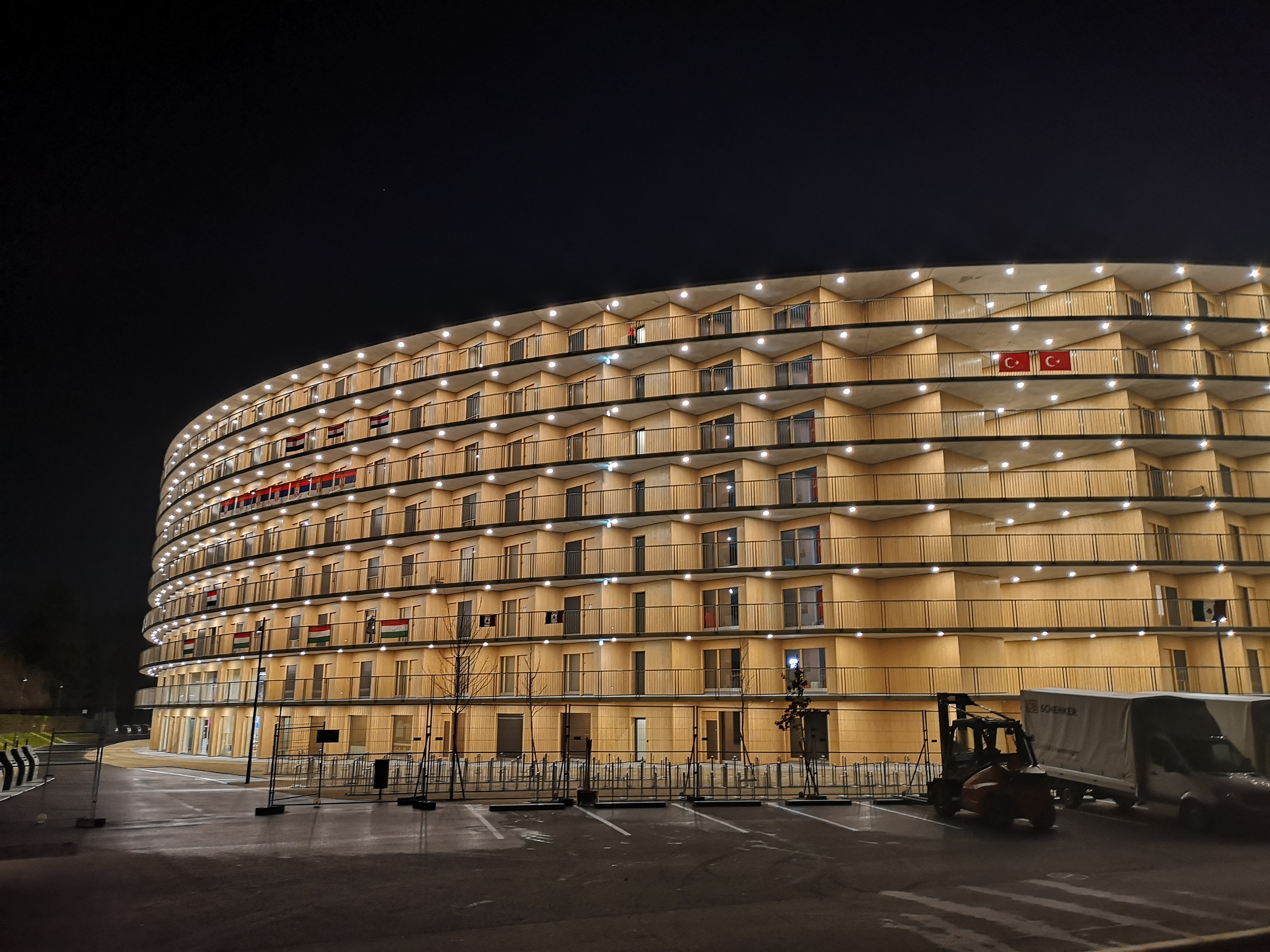
The "Vortex" building

== Other education and research institutions in Lausanne ==
Other education and research institutions in Lausanne includes:

- University Hospital of Lausanne (CHUV)
  - Swiss Laboratory for Doping Analyses
- Ludwig Centre for Cancer Research of the University of Lausanne
- Swiss Cancer Centre
- École hôtelière de Lausanne (EHL)
- École cantonale d'art de Lausanne (ECAL)
- International Institute for Management Development (IMD)
- Business School Lausanne (BSL)

== Bibliography ==
- (in French) Jean-Philippe Leresche, Frédéric Joye-Cagnard, Martin Benninghoff and Raphaël Ramuz, Gouverner les universités. L'exemple de la coordination Genève-Lausanne (1990-2010), Presses polytechniques et universitaires romandes, 2012 (ISBN 9782880749316).
- (in French) Nadja Maillard, L'Université de Lausanne à Dorigny, Éditions Infolio, 488 pages, 2013 (ISBN 978-2-88474-280-1).

== See also ==
- List of universities in Switzerland
- Education in Switzerland
- Science and technology in Switzerland
- Health Valley
- Campus Biotech
