= Archizoom =

Archizoom may refer to:

- Archizoom Associati, design studio from Florence, Italy
- Archizoom (EPFL), architecture museum located on the EPFL campus, Switzerland
