= CHUV station =

Lausanne Metro station

CHUV
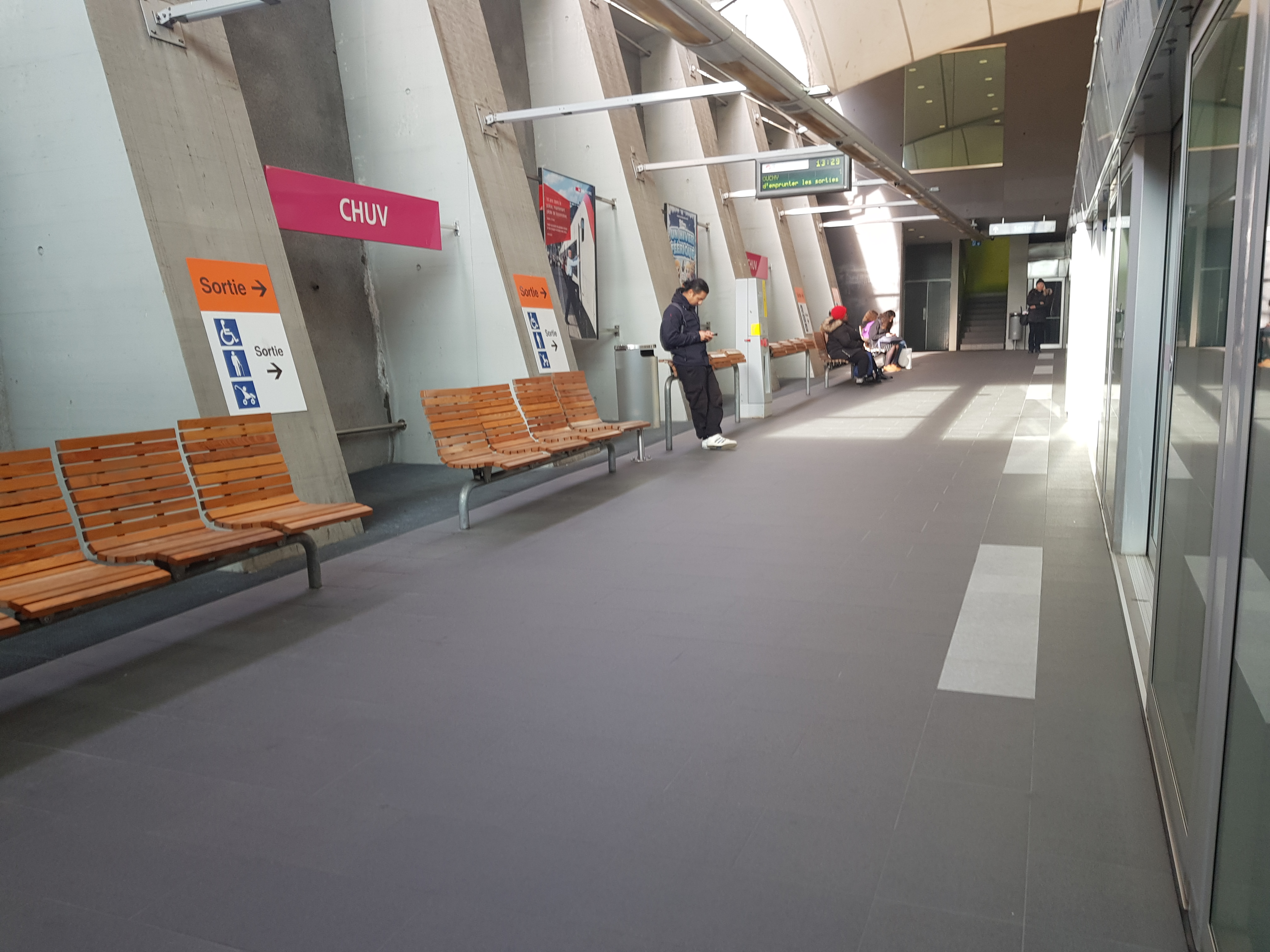

General information
- Location: Switzerland
- Coordinates: 46°31′35″N 6°38′29″E
- System: Lausanne Metro station
- Line: Line M2

History
- Opened: 27 October 2008

Services
Preceding station	Lausanne Metro	Following station
Ours towards Ouchy-Olympique	M2	Sallaz towards Croisettes
Location

CHUV is a Lausanne Metro station on Line M2. It was opened on 27 October 2008 as part of the inaugural section of the line, from Croisettes to Ouchy–Olympique. The station is located between Sallaz and Ours. The name of the station originates from the Lausanne University Hospital, Centre hospitalier universitaire vaudois in French.
