= Patrick Moser =

Swiss writer, translator, art historian, and museologist

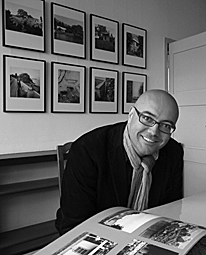

Patrick Moser (born 25 May 1969) is a Swiss writer, translator, art historian, and museologist. He is the founder and curator of the Museum "Le Lac" Le Corbusier.

== Early life ==
Moser began studying literature at the University of Lausanne. After completing his formal education, he began teaching and studying translation and interpretation. In 2001, he obtained a post-graduate degree in museology from the University of Geneva for his thesis From the dwelling house to the exhibition space – example of the Villa "Le Lac" Le Corbusier.

Moser became a translator. His work is noted by Kenneth Branagh, for whom Moser translated an adaptation of Shakespeare's Love's Labour's Lost into French. Moser translated for Martin Scorsese’s film Gangs of New York and Tim Burton’s Big Fish. He translated for the Swiss documentary Im toten Winkel (In the blind spot - Hitler’s secretary) by André Heller and Othmar Schmiderer.

In 2010, Moser created, according to Le Corbusier's wish in one of his last letters (1965), a museum at the Villa "Le Lac", in Corseaux, Switzerland. Photographers Erling Mandelmann and René Burri contributed to the creation of the museum by lending their works for the first two exhibitions in 2010 and 2011. In 2015, on the occasion of the 50th anniversary of the architect's death, Moser invited Daniel Libeskind, Mario Botta, Zaha Hadid, Toyo Ito, SANAA, Rudy Ricciotti, Bernard Tschumi, Gigon/Guyer, Alvaro Siza and Rafael Moneo to an extension project of the Villa "Le Lac" – a competition of ideas and imagination in honour of one of the 20th century's greatest architects.

In 2013, Moser was invited to the Chalmers Technical University in Gothenburg, Sweden to present his research on the links between architecture and literature. Several conferences followed, notably at Doctor Curutchet's Villa in La Plata, Argentina (2015), and at the Mies van der Rohe house of the Weissenhof Siedlung in Stuttgart (2016) as part of the Französische Wochen im Grossraum Stuttgart (Weissenhofwerkstatt im Haus Mies van der Rohe).

In 2017, the University of Lausanne entrusted him with curating the in situ exhibition "From BFSH 2 to Anthropole - 1987-2017" on the occasion of the 30th anniversary of the Building of the Faculties of Human Sciences II. He participated in the round table on 3 November at EPFL to mark the 75th anniversary of the Swiss Association of Interior Architects (VSI). ASAI with Jacques-Xavier Aymon (EAD interior designer, HEAD emeritus professor), Yves Corminboeuf (HES industrial designer, specialist in sustainable development), Thomas Juguin (SSA graduate acoustician), Bruno Marchand (Dr ès Sciences, EPFL architect, EPFL professor), Corinne Mosimann (interior architect) and Victor Vieillard (lighting designer).

In 2018, he collaborated with the Archives de la construction moderne and Archizoom (EPFL) on the exhibition "Habiter la modernité - Villas du style international sur la Riviera lémanique" at the Atelier de Grandi (6 Sept. - 29 Nov. 2018) and participated on 4 October 2018 in the round table "Habiter la modernité" with Joëlle Neuenschwander, Paola Tosolini, Salvatore Aprea, Christophe Flubacher and Cyril Veillon. In 2019, a plea in favour of towers and skyscrapers in Switzerland came with the exhibition De Bel-Air à Babel at the Villa "Le Lac" Le Corbusier for which Moser analysed five towers built or planned between 1930 and 1970 in Lausanne, Vevey, Montreux and Aminona, works by five major 20th century architects: Jean Tschumi, René Deléchat, Alphonse Laverrière, Hugo Buscaglia and Philippe Gaillard.

In 2019, Moser was invited to the AHA! Festival in Gothenburg to give a lecture at the Chalmers University of Technology on the Essence of Villa "Le Lac".

== Publications ==
Moser is the inventor of the nanotext - a literary genre between haiku and short story - short, dense, polysemic and cinematographic.

In 2002, after many adjustments, Moser published a collection of nanotexts, La Saveur des Mots, a work of generic exploration, experimentation and discovery. In 2003 came his second nanotext opus, Icare followed by, Tu ne voleras point in 2005. This last collection was awarded the 2005 Jean Amaury Prize.

In 2010, Moser published Epilogue, a play that became a comic strip thanks to a collaboration with David Delcloque, a French graphic designer and illustrator (Boulogne-sur-Mer). With Epilogue, nanotextual writing found its first theatrical and comic application.

In 2010, Moser initiated a series of bibliophile publications on architecture, exhibition catalogues and specialized works. Although the titles are in French, the publications are bilingual (French–English) or trilingual (French-German-English).

- Once upon a time there was the Villa – The plan before the site and other stories, exhibition catalogue nr. 10 Villa "Le Lac" Le Corbusier, Call me Edouard Éditeurs | Publishers, 2023
- "Dix décennies en dix clichés, et plus... 1923-2023", in LC. REVUE DE RECHERCHES SUR LE CORBUSIER #07, mars 2023 (ISSN-e 2660-7212, Nº. 7, 2023, p. 135-160).
- Guide till fiktionens verklighetens arkitektur in Glänta (in Swedish) edited by Göran Dahlberg, 2020.
- La modernité dans Lavaux, in "Les bâtisseurs de Lavaux", sous la direction de Bruno Corthésy, Presses Polytechniques et Universitaires Romandes, 2019.
- De Bel-Air à Babel – Un rêve de grandeur, catalogue d'exposition n° 8 Villa "Le Lac" Le Corbusier, Call me Edouard Éditeurs | Publishers, 2019
- Florence Cosnefroy – Couleurs et correspondances, catalogue d'exposition n° 7 Villa "Le Lac" Le Corbusier, Call me Edouard Éditeurs | Publishers, 2019
- Vivre la modernité à la Villa "Le Lac" de Le Corbusier, in « Habiter la modernité », Editions de l'Atelier de Grandi, 2018
- Adrien Couvrat – Le Corbusier et les reflets de la couleur, catalogue d'exposition n° 6 Villa "Le Lac" Le Corbusier, Call me Edouard Éditeurs | Publishers, 2017
- Three lectures - Gothenburg, La Plata, Stuttgart, (in French, English and German), Architext, 2013, 2015, 2016
- Pascal Dufaux - Alien Camera, Installation à la Villa "Le Lac" Le Corbusier, Call me Edouard Éditeurs | Publishers, 2016
- Hommage à Le Corbusier, catalogue d'exposition n^{o} 5 Villa "Le Lac" Le Corbusier, Call me Edouard Éditeurs | Publishers, 2015
- Daniel Schlaepfer - Une Petite Maison de Nuit, mise en lumière de la Villa "Le Lac" Le Corbusier, Call me Edouard Éditeurs | Publishers, 2015
- Alberto Sartoris ou la quatrième dimension de l'architecture, catalogue d'exposition n^{o} 4 Villa "Le Lac" Le Corbusier, Call me Edouard Éditeurs | Publishers, 2014
- Ecal chez Le Corbusier, catalogue d'exposition n^{o} 3 Villa "Le Lac" Le Corbusier, Ed. Castagniééé, 2012
- René Burri - Le Corbusier intime, catalogue d'exposition n^{o} 2 Villa "Le Lac" Le Corbusier, Ed. Castagniééé, 2011
- Erling Mandelmann - Le photographe, le musicien et l'architecte, catalogue d'exposition n^{o} 1 Villa "Le Lac" Le Corbusier, Ed. Castagniééé, 2010
- Epilogue, Bande Dessinée en collaboration avec David Delcloque, Ed. Castagniééé, 2010
- L'Autogrphe de James Mason, in « Rencontre II », Ed. de l'Aire, 2009
- Le Chat qui vous ressemble, nanotexte illustré par David Delcloque, Ed. Castagniééé, 2006
- Tu ne voleras point, nanotextes, Ed. Castagniééé, 2005
- La Colo, in « Dis-moi ton Ange », Ed. Publi-Libris, 2005
- L’Accordéon, in « La Venoge côté cœur », Ed. Publi-Libris, 2004
- Icare, nanotextes, Ed. Castagniééé, 2003
- Ecce Homo, nanotexte illustré par Maude Fattebert, Ed. Castagniééé, 2002
- La Saveur des Mots, Ed. Castagniééé, nanotextes, 2002

== Sources ==
- Patrick Moser – Villa "Le Lac" Le Corbusier
- Bibliothèque cantonale et universitaire de Lausanne
- Patrick Moser - Tu ne voleras point
- A D S - Autorinnen und Autoren der Schweiz - Autrices et Auteurs de Suisse - Autrici ed Autori della Svizzera
- Ansermoz, Claude (28 septembre 2017) L'homme qui lit en Le Corbusier comme dans un livre ouvert, 24 heures
