= Elisa Oricchio =

Italian cancer researcher

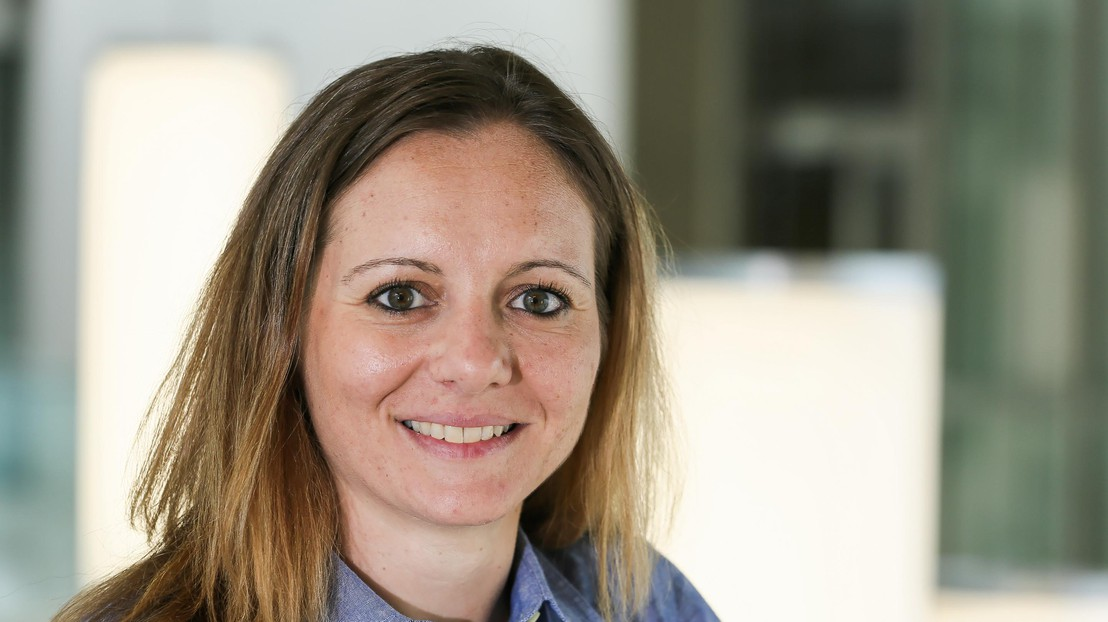
- Born: 1979 (age 46–47); Vallo della Lucania, Italy
- Education: Sapienza University of Rome; University of Rome Tor Vergata
- Occupation: Cell biologist
- Years active: 2010–present
- Employer: École Polytechnique Fédérale de Lausanne
- Known for: Identifying the ephrin receptor A7 (EphA7) triggers tumor suppression in follicular lymphoma
- Website: https://www.epfl.ch/labs/oricchiolab/

Elisa Oricchio (born 1979) is an Italian cancer researcher and associate professor at École Polytechnique Fédérale de Lausanne. She discovered that EphA7 activates the tumor suppressor gene for patients with follicular lymphoma and was awarded the Lorini Foundation Award and Blavatnik Award for Young Scientists for her discovery.

== Biography ==
Elisa Oricchio was born in 1979 and grew up in Cilento, Italy. She earned a bachelor's degree and went on to attain a master's degree in biology from Sapienza University of Rome. In 2008, she earned her PhD in Medical Microbiology and Immunology from the University of Rome Tor Vergata. Oricchio moved to the United States almost immediately to begin her post-doctorate research at Memorial Sloan Kettering Cancer Center in New York City. In her research, she identified in 2011 that tumor cells treated with pure EphA7, an anti-tumor protein, died, which was a significant discovery in a rarely researched field. Her discovery was awarded with a grant from Sloan Kettering and a Fellowship from the Lymphoma Research Foundation to make further studies of follicular lymphoma. In addition to the research funds, she received the Lorini Foundation Award on 7 May 2012 in Milan, Italy and the Blavatnik Award for Young Scientists in New York City, the same year.

In 2012, her research identified that nearly 70% of patients with follicular lymphoma have lost the EphA7 receptor and she was experimenting with methods of reintroducing the protein into the cells. Because there has been no cure success with traditional chemotherapies, Oricchio's work has repeatedly been funded. She was awarded a second Fellowship from the Leukemia and Lymphoma Society and a grant from the US National Institutes of Health. In 2013, she was awarded with a plaque from the town of Vallo della Lucania in her home region of Italy for her research, which was successful in developing a mouse model. In 2014, she was hired by the Swiss Federal Institute of Technology as a researcher and to support creation of the new Swiss Cancer Center in Lausanne at the Lausanne University Hospital. The Swiss Institute for Experimental Cancer Research created an endowed chair in Translational Oncology for Oricchio and effective 1 November 2014, she became a tenured assistant professor at the École Polytechnique Fédérale de Lausanne, School of Life Sciences. In September 2021, she was promoted associate professor.

== Accolades ==
Discovered tumor cells treated with pure EphA7; an anti-tumor protein has died.	2011
Awarded with a grant from Sloan Kettering and a Fellowship from the Lymphoma Research Foundation.	2011
Awarded the Lorini Foundation Award	2012
Awarded the Blavatnik Award for Young Scientists	2012
Awarded a plaque in her hometown of Vallo della Lucania in Italy for her research in helping develop a mouse model.	2013

== Selected publications ==
- Oricchio, Elisa; Saladino, Chiara; Iacovelli, Stefano; Soddu, Silvia; Cundari, Enrico (21 January 2006). "ATM is activated by default in mitosis, localizes at centrosomes and monitors mitotic spindle integrity". Cell Cycle. 5 (1). Rome, Italy: Institute of Biology and Molecular Pathology, National Research Council: 88–92. doi:10.4161/cc.5.1.2269. PMID 16319535.
- Bonaccorsi, Irene; Altieri, Fabio; Sciamanna, Ilaria; Oricchio, Elisa; Grillo, Caterina; et al. (20 May 2008). "Endogenous reverse transcriptase as a mediator of ursolic acid's anti-proliferative and differentiating effects in human cancer cell lines". Cancer Letters. 263 (1). Messina, Italy: School of Pharmacy, University of Messina: 130–139. doi:10.1016/j.canlet.2007.12.026. PMID 18282657.
- Mavrakis, Konstantinos J; Wolfe, Andrew L; Oricchio, Elisa; Palomero, Teresa; et al. (28 April 2010). "Genome-wide RNA-mediated interference screen identifies miR-19 targets in Notch-induced T-cell acute lymphoblastic leukaemia". Nature Cell Biology. 12 (4). New York, New York: Nature Publishing Group: 372–379. doi:10.1038/ncb2037. PMC 2989719. PMID 20190740.
- Oricchio, Elisa; Wolfe, Andrew L; Schatz, Jonathan H; Mavrakis, Konstantinos J; et al. (November–December 2010). "Mouse models of cancer as biological filters for complex genomic data". Disease Models & Mechanisms. 3 (11–12). Cambridge, UK: The Company of Biologists: 701–704. doi:10.1242/dmm.006296. PMC 2965398. PMID 20876355.
- Oricchio, Elisa; Nanjangud, Gouri; Wolfe, Andrew L; Schatz, Jonathan H; et al. (October 2011). "The Eph-receptor A7 is a soluble tumor suppressor for follicular lymphoma". Cell. 147 (3). Cambridge, Massachusetts: Elsevier Inc.: 554–564. doi:10.1016/j.cell.2011.09.035. PMC 3208379. PMID 22036564.
- Oricchio, Elisa; Wendel, Hans-Guido (15 March 2012). "Mining the cancer genome uncovers therapeutic activity of EphA7 against lymphoma". Cell Cycle. 11 (6). New York, New York: Taylor & Francis: 1076–1080. doi:10.4161/cc.11.6.19451. PMC 3335915. PMID 22356769.
- Oricchio, Elisa; Wendel, Hans-Guido (July 2013). "Functional genomics lead to new therapies in follicular lymphoma". Annals of the New York Academy of Sciences. 1293 (1). New York, New York: New York Academy of Sciences: 18–24. Bibcode:2013NYASA1293...18O. doi:10.1111/nyas.12120. PMC 3987118. PMID 23676193.
- Oricchio, Elisa; Ciriello, Giovanni; Jiang, Man; Boice, Michael H; et al. (June 2014). "Frequent disruption of the RB pathway in indolent follicular lymphoma suggests a new combination therapy". Journal of Experimental Medicine. 211 (7). New York, New York: The Rockefeller University Press: 1379–1391. doi:10.1084/jem.20132120. PMC 4076578. PMID 24913233.
