= Swiss Institute of Comparative Law =

Federal administration agency in Switzerland

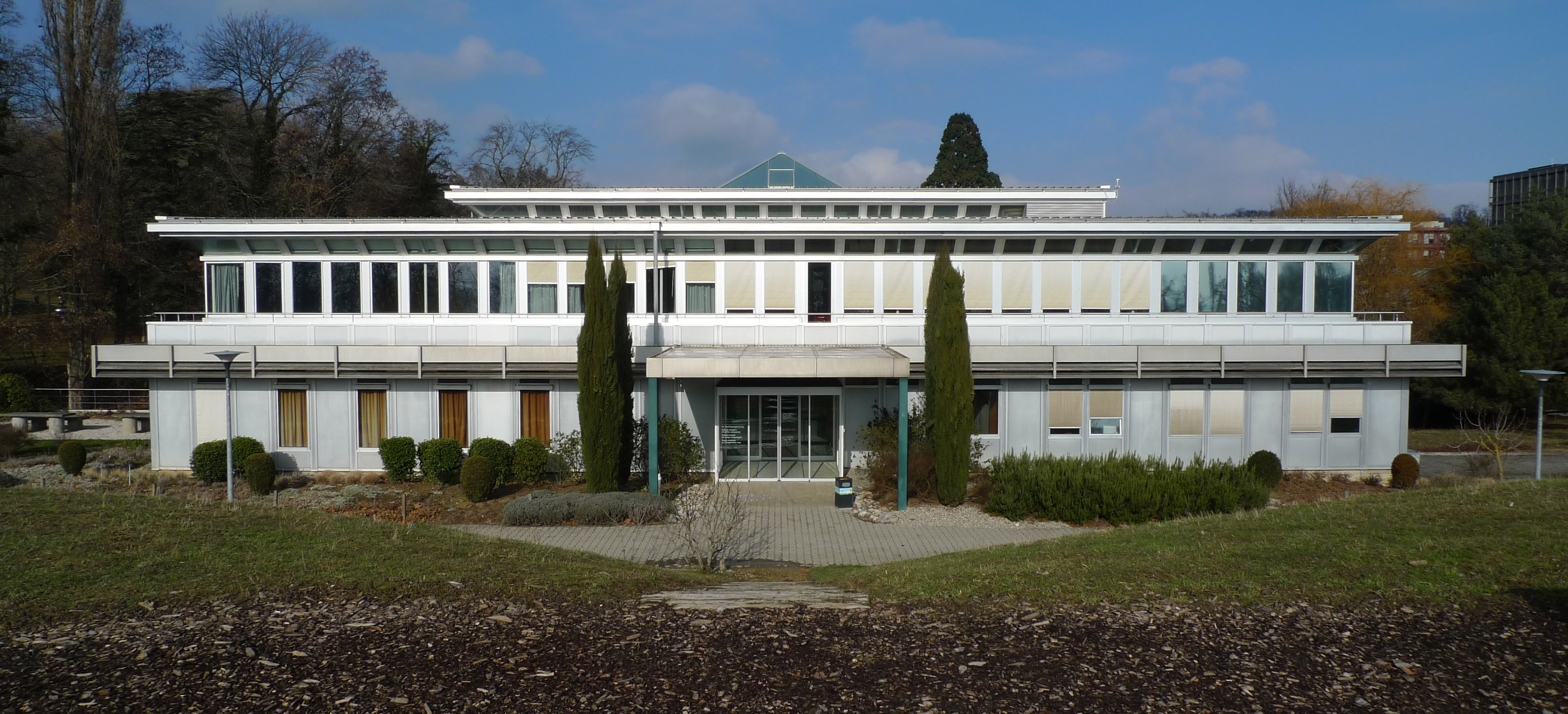
- 46°31′18″N 6°34′58″E
- Location: Lausanne, Switzerland

Other information
- Website: Official website

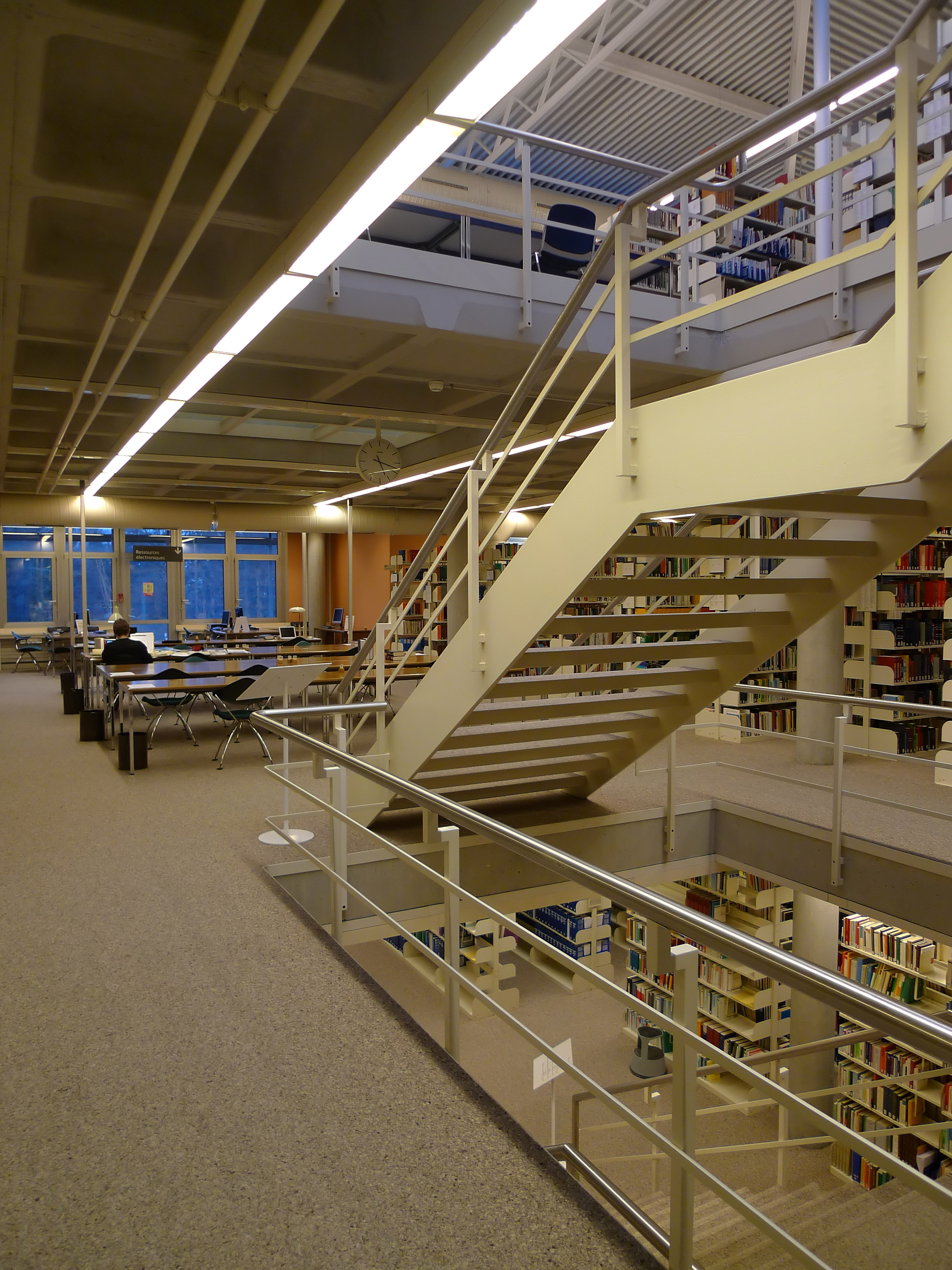
The library floors of the Institute

The Swiss Institute of Comparative Law (French: Institut suisse de droit comparé (ISDC), German: Schweizerisches Institut für Rechtsvergleichung) is an agency of the federal administration of Switzerland charged with research and consultancy in comparative law.

Its principal mission is to furnish opinions about foreign law to the administration, the courts and the public. It also operates a publicly accessible research library, which holds 360,000 volumes and served 6,000 visitors in 2008.

The institute was founded through federal statute in 1978. It is located on the campus of the University of Lausanne and is administratively attached to the Federal Department of Justice and Police. It employs a staff of about 30 researchers, librarians and clerical personnel.

== Full-time positions since 2007 ==
Raw data

Source: "Federal Finance Administration FFA: Data portal".

== See also ==
- Lausanne campus
- Law of Switzerland

== Notes and references ==
- Swiss Institute of Comparative Law. "Rapport annuel 2008" (PDF) (in French).
- Federal Act on the Swiss Institute of Comparative Law , SR/RS 425.1 ^{(E·D·F·I)}
