= Sallaz station =

Lausanne Metro station

Sallaz
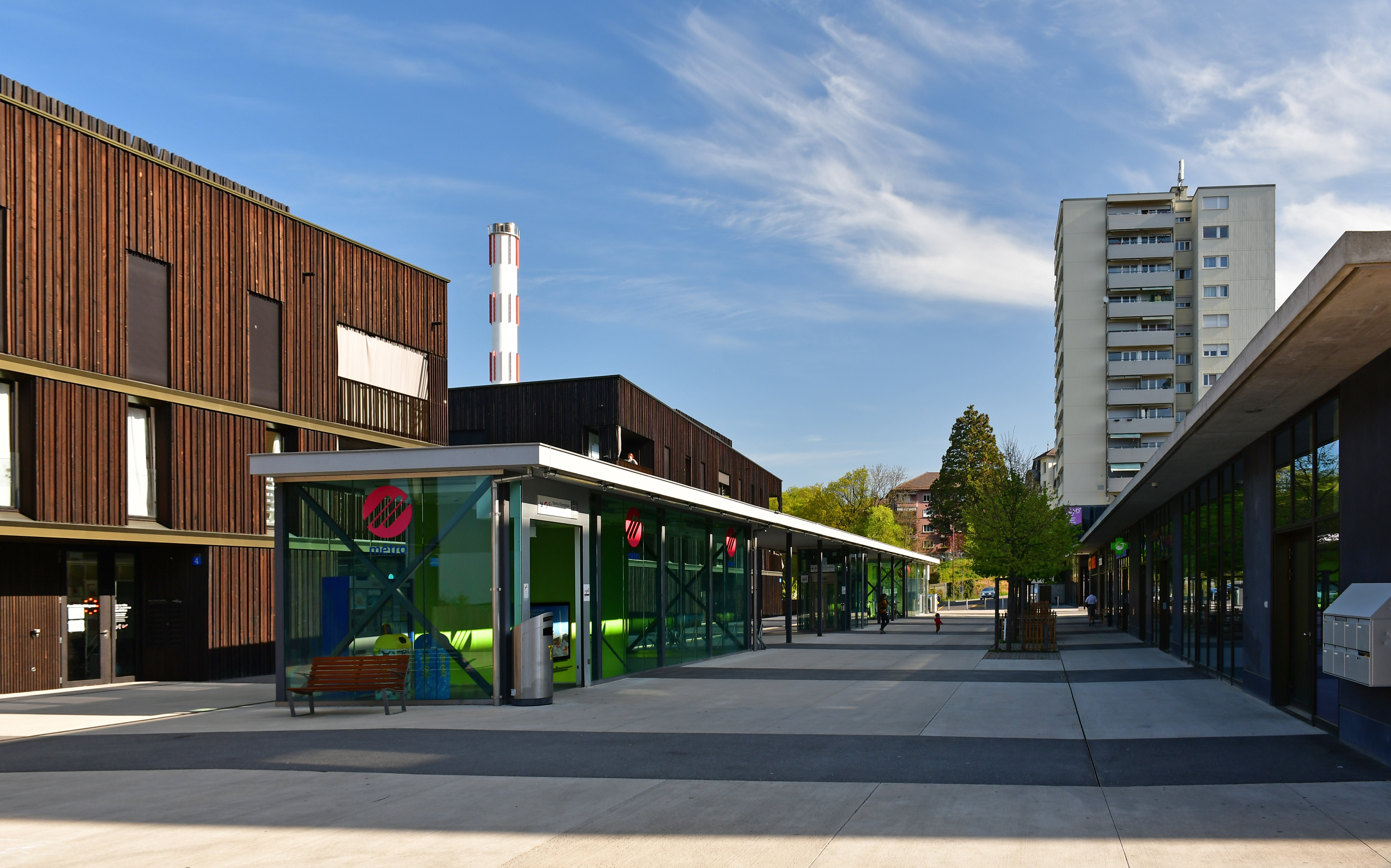
- Entrance to the station

General information
- Location: Switzerland
- Coordinates: 46°31′58″N 6°38′46″E
- System: Lausanne Metro station
- Line: Line M2

History
- Opened: 27 October 2008

Services
Preceding station	Lausanne Metro	Following station
CHUV towards Ouchy-Olympique	M2	Fourmi towards Croisettes
Location

Sallaz is a Lausanne Metro station on Line M2. It was opened on 27 October 2008 as part of the inaugural section of the line, from Croisettes to Ouchy–Olympique. The station is located between Fourmi and CHUV.

The name of the station originates from the quarter of Sallaz.
