= George Coukos =

Tumor immunologist

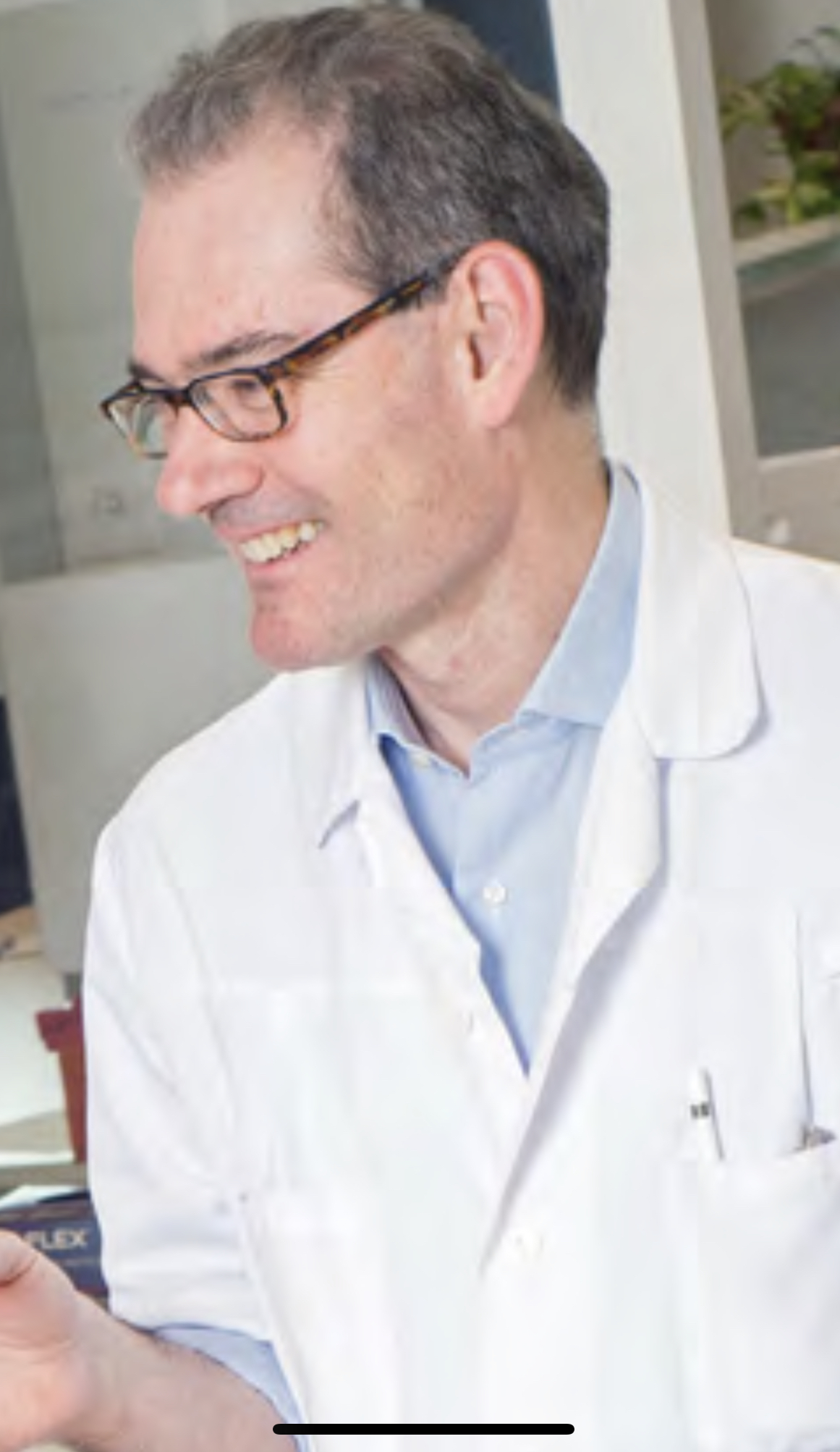
- Born: December 23, 1961 (age 64)
- Education: University of Modena; University of Patras; University of Pennsylvania
- Scientific career
- Fields: Cancer immunotherapy
- Workplaces: University of Pennsylvania; University of Lausanne; Weill Cornell Medicine

George Coukos (born December 23, 1961) is a physician-scientist specializing in tumor immunology. He is currently director of the Ludwig Laboratory for Cell Therapy and professor of immunology in medicine, at Weill Cornell Medicine. He is known for his work on the mechanisms by which tumors suppress anti-cancer immune responses, and the role of the tumor vasculature in that suppression. In addition to his work in ovarian cancer, the combinatorial immune therapies proposed by Professor Coukos have been successfully tested and approved for lung, liver and kidney cancers.

== Early life and education ==
Born and raised in Greece, George Coukos obtained his MD in 1986 at the University of Modena, Italy, and his PhD in 1991 at the University of Patras, Greece. He completed training in Obstetrics and Gynecology at the University of Modena in 1991. He then undertook a post-doctorate fellowship in cell biology at the University of Pennsylvania in Philadelphia (1991–1994), where he also completed residency training in obstetrics and gynecology (1994–1997) and fellowship training in Gynecologic Oncology (1997–2000).

== Career ==
In 2000, he became assistant professor at the University of Pennsylvania. He became an associate professor in 2006 and a full professor in 2010. At the University of Pennsylvania, George Coukos founded (2007) and directed the Ovarian Cancer Research Center, and served as associate director of the Division of Gynecologic Oncology. In 2012, Coukos was recruited by the University of Lausanne to head up the Department of Oncology UNIL-CHUV, of the Lausanne University Hospital in Switzerland. He was appointed director of the Lausanne Branch of the Ludwig Institute for Cancer Research in the same year. In 2026, Coukos was appointed director of the newly-formed Ludwig Laboratory for Cell Therapy at Weill Cornell Medicine, housed within the Sandra and Edward Meyer Cancer Center. At that time, Coukos was also appointed professor of immunology in medicine at Weill Cornell Medicine.

== Major accomplishments ==
- Discovery of a spontaneous anti-tumor response in ovarian cancer, previously thought to be present only in a few tumor types, such as kidney cancer or melanoma
- First to propose the notion that tumor endothelial barrier actively controls the localization of T cells in tumors, sparking major international efforts towards the development of combinations of anti-angiogenesis drugs with immune checkpoints in numerous solid tumors
- Discovery of mechanisms of immune recognition, including neoantigens, and development of rational T-cell therapy based on pursuit of neoantigens
- Discovery of the pro-angiogenic role of T regulatory cells and tumor monocytes
- Development of immunotherapies such as an autologous dendritic cell vaccine and adoptive T-cell therapy with vaccine-primed autologous T-cells

== Awards and honors ==
- American Association of Obstetricians and Gynecologists Foundation's Scholar (2000)
- Bristol-Myers Immunology-Oncology Young Investigator Grant, Gynecologic Cancer Foundation (2001)
- Translational Science Award, Sidney Kimmel Foundation (2002)
- Margaret Greenfield Award for Excellence in Ovarian Cancer Research, Gynecologic Cancer Foundation (2005)
- Judah Folkman Award, Alliance for Cancer Gene Therapy (2006)
- Sir William Osler Award for Excellence in Patient-Oriented Research, University of Pennsylvania (2006)
- Mimi Yurkow Courage Award, National Ovarian Cancer Coalition, Southern New Jersey Chapter(2007)
- Teal Magnolias Award, National Ovarian Cancer Coalition (2008)
- Ovarian Cancer Research Alliance (2008 and 2012)
- Angela Carlino Award, Sandy Foundation (2009)
- Rosalind Franklin Excellence in Ovarian Cancer Research Award (2010)
- National Institutes of Health (NIH) Director's Transformative Award (2010)
- Claudia Cohen Research Foundation Prize for Outstanding Gynecologic (2012)
- Advanced grant, European Research Council (2013)
- Stewart J. Rahr Foundation Prostate Cancer Foundation Challenge Award (2018)
- Helga Salvesen Award for Best Translational Research, European Society of Gynecological Oncology (2019)
- European Society of Medical Oncology Award for Translational Research (2021)
- Web of Science Highly Cited Researcher (2019, 2020, 2021, 2022, 2023 and 2024)
- American Association for Cancer Research (AACR) Academy Fellow (2023)
- US National Academy of Medicine (2024)
