= Swiss Laboratory for Doping Analyses =

Swiss anti-doping laboratory

- Laboratoire suisse d'analyse du dopage
- Motto: « Une compétence et une éthique scientifique au service de la communauté sportive »
- Established: 1 January 1990
- Field of research: Doping in sport
- Director: Tiia Kuuranne
- Location: Chemin des Croisettes 22, Épalinges, Switzerland
- Affiliations: University Hospital of Lausanne
- Website: www.doping.chuv.ch

The Swiss Laboratory for Doping Analyses (French: Laboratoire suisse d'analyse du dopage, LAD) is the only anti-doping laboratory in Switzerland.

It is affiliated to the University Hospital of Lausanne and is located in Épalinges (urban area of Lausanne).

== History ==
The Swiss Laboratory for Doping Analyses was founded in 1990 and accredited by the International Olympic Committee in 1991.

It is also accredited by the World Anti-Doping Agency.

== Mission ==
The Swiss Laboratory for Doping Analyses is the testing laboratory for many international sport competitions such as the Tour de France (since 1997), the UEFA Euro 2008 and the 2014 FIFA World Cup.

== See also ==
- Biological passport
