= Mobility Carsharing =

Mobility Cooperative
- Type: Cooperative
- Industry: shared transport
- Founded: 2 May 1997
- Headquarters: Rotkreuz
- Key people: Corinne Vogel (Managing Director); Raoul Stöckle (Chairman of the Board of Directors)
- Revenue: 82.1 million CHF (2025)
- Number of employees: 238 (2025)

Mobility Carsharing (officially Mobility Cooperative, also known as Mobility Car Sharing or simply Mobility for short) is a Swiss cooperative of carsharing. It covers almost all organised carsharing in Switzerland. Mobility was founded in 1997, is organised as a cooperative and has around 3,300 vehicles at 1,600 locations across Switzerland. Mobility has 298,000 customers (as of 2025), around a quarter of whom are members of the cooperative (approx. 76,000 people).

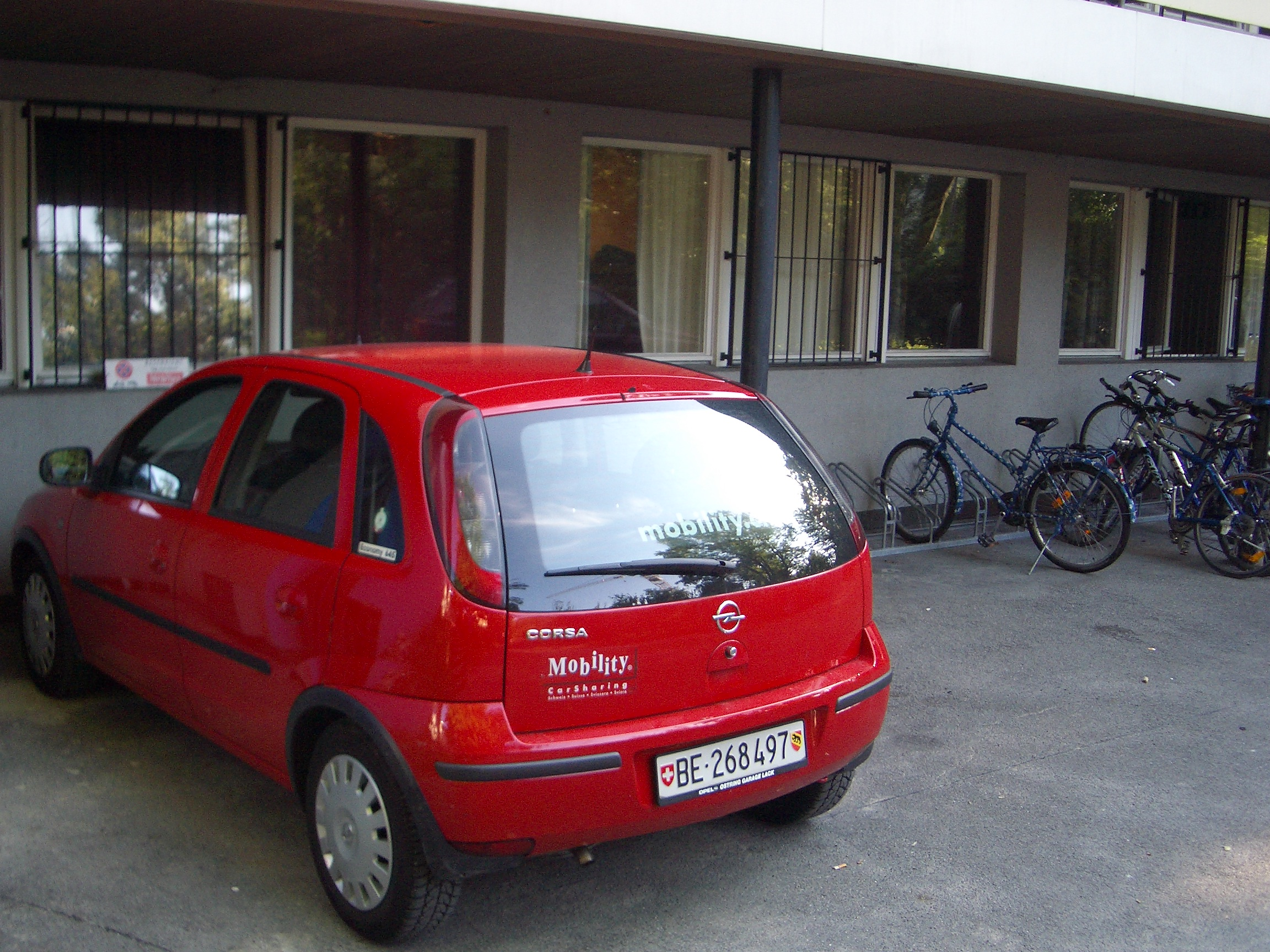
A Mobility car in Bern.

== History ==
Mobility was founded in 1997 with the merger of the two Swiss car sharing cooperatives AutoTeilet-Genossenschaft (ATG) and ShareCom. These predecessor companies were both founded in 1987, ATG in Stans and ShareCom in Zurich. The two began cooperating as early on as 1991, each enabling their members to use the other's vehicles. That same year they were both involved in setting up the association European Car Sharing. In 1996, ATG took over the Geneva-based cooperative CopAuto (founded in 1993). ShareCom developed the first on-board computers in the same year.

Mobility Cooperative was formed from the merger between ATG and ShareCom in 1997: its registered headquarters were in Zurich and it had 17,400 customers and 760 vehicles. After this, the reservation system underwent technological refinement: the vehicles were fitted with on-board computers and members were issued with a chip card (Mobility Card). Online reservations were introduced, too. These expensive technical facilities imposed a considerable financial burden on the company and a restructuring programme was initiated in the year 2000. Since then, Mobility has continuously increased its number of cooperative members and customers as well as adding more vehicles and sites. A range of cooperative ventures have been launched or expanded. In 2013 Mobility received the GfM award from the Swiss Marketing Association.

In 2014, Mobility launched Switzerland's first station-independent car sharing service called Catch a Car in Basel. Members could locate the cars via smartphone or website and drive from A to B without prior reservation. Catch a Car was in a two-year pilot phase until early 2016. Due to the positive results of the pilot project, the station-independent car sharing service continued to be offered in Basel and expanded to Geneva in 2016. The impact of Catch a Car on the mobility behaviour of individual members was scientifically monitored by ETH Zurich. In 2019, Mobility took over Catch a Car completely and integrated it into the Mobility system under the name Mobility Go. The service in Geneva was discontinued in 2020. The service in Basel was discontinued in June 2022. From 19 April 2018 to 4 November 2019, Mobility offered 200 red e-scooters in the city of Zurich. In addition, Mobility launched a pilot project for self-driving buses in the city of Zug in the spring of 2017 in collaboration with SBB and other partners.

Mobility is one of the founding members of the industry association Swiss Alliance for Collaborative Mobility (CHACOMO), which was established in December 2021 on the initiative of the Mobility Academy. In 2023, the carpooling-based taxi service i&any was launched in the city of Zurich. On 1 October 2007, the legal domicile was moved to Lucerne, where the cooperative's operational headquarters were already located. Since 11 December 2017, Mobility's headquarters have been in Rotkreuz, Canton of Zug.

== Fleet ==
Mobility operates more than 3,300 vehicles at 1,600 locations.The cooperative does not own any parking spaces; instead, it rents them from private individuals, companies, or the public sector. The vehicles are primarily available at train stations and in urban areas. This is partly due to partnerships with various public transport companies in the area of connecting mobility.

The vehicle fleet comprises ordinary vehicles in 7 categories, ranging from frugal compact cars, convertibles and light vans to transporters. Their striking red colour is the company's main hallmark, making the vehicles clearly recognizable throughout Switzerland. One of the key considerations for Mobility's vehicle management programme is sustainability: according to the company itself, its entire fleet achieves emissions averaging 97 g CO_{2}/km. This puts Mobility 33% below Switzerland's mandatory threshold as applicable from 2015.

The car-sharing provider is increasingly focusing on electric vehicles. At the beginning of 2024, around 500 of the 3,000 Mobility vehicles were electric.

== How the system works ==
Mobility offers 24 hours availability, and charges by hour and km traveled, with a minimum charging period of 1 hour. Vehicles are reserved online via the mobile app or website, or by telephone. The reservation of the vehicle is confirmed in real time. The vehicle can then be opened and used with mobile app, the Mobility Card, or SwissPass. Certain vehicle types are fitted so that they can be operated entirely without a key.

Once the vehicle has been returned, the on-board computer once again relays the trip details via email or text message for invoicing purposes. Fees are charged based on the number of kilometres travelled and the duration of use. The fee includes all costs for fuel, motor insurance, tax, maintenance and depreciation.

== Stations ==
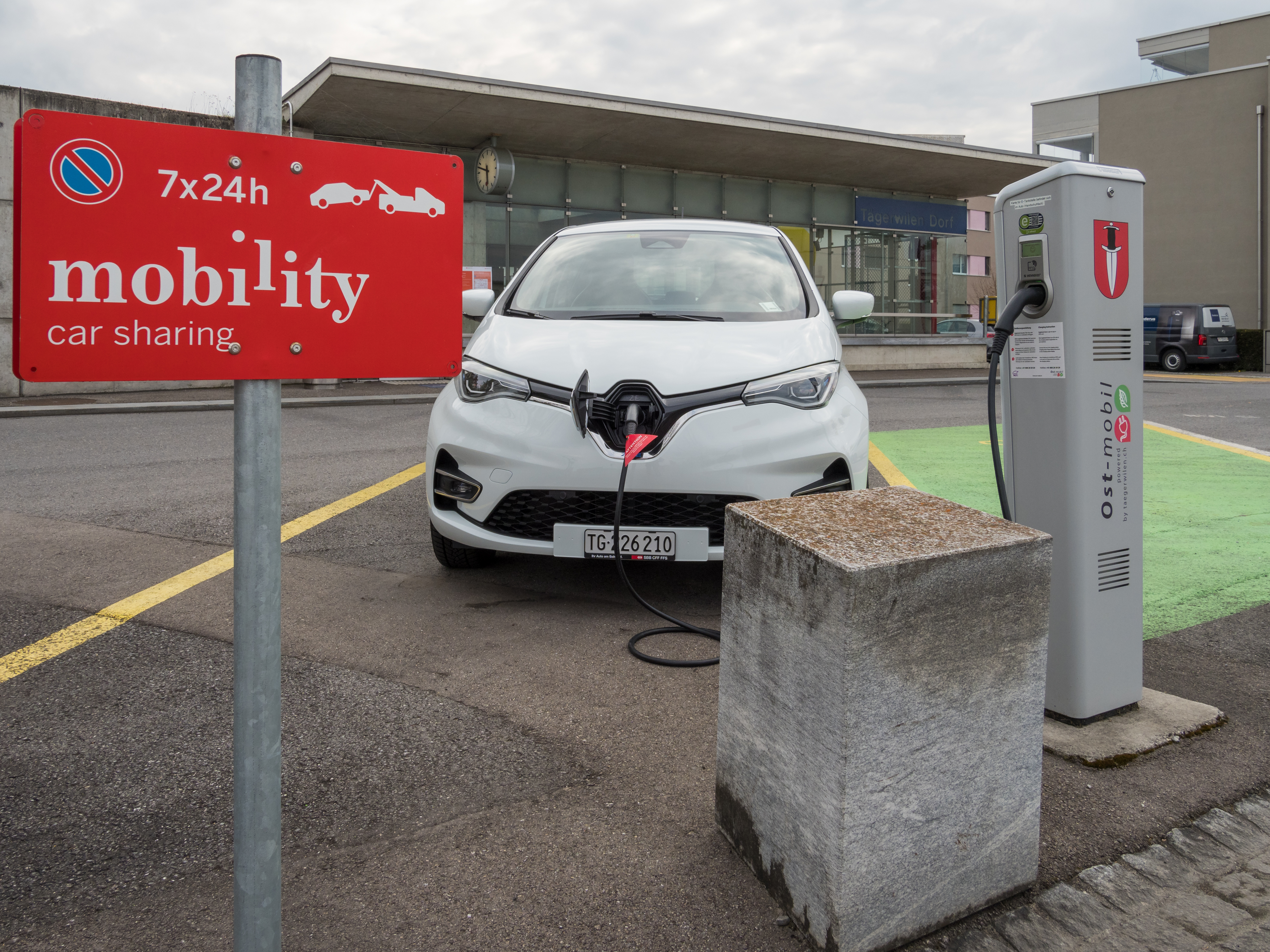
Mobility electric car at Tägerwilen-Dorf Railway Station

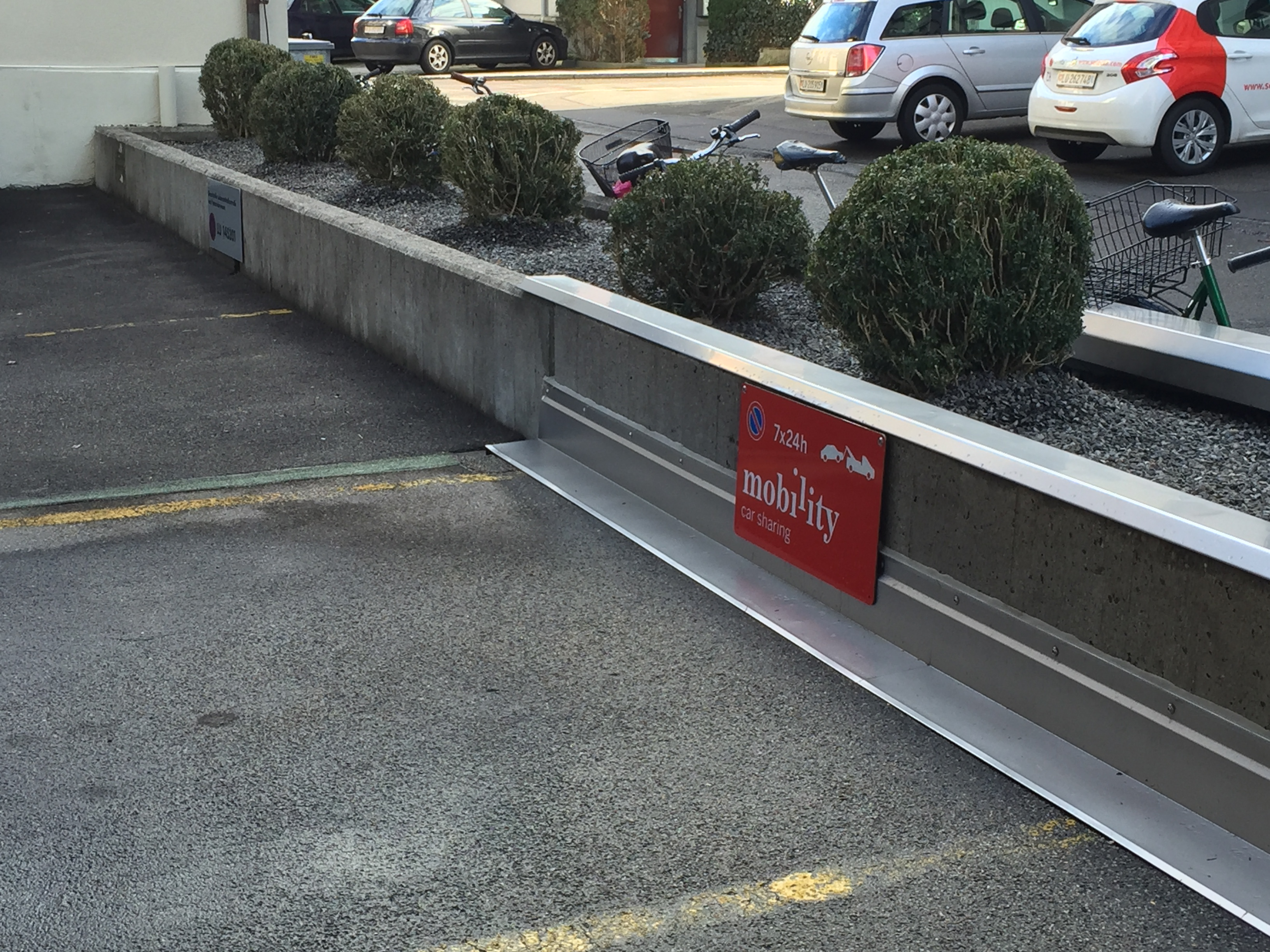
A Mobility station in Lucerne.

Mobility primarily locates its vehicles at railways stations and in conurbations. This is due to the fact that it collaborates with various public transportation companies so as to provide interconnected mobility services. As a result, more than 40% of Mobility cars are situated at railway stations of the Swiss Federal Railways. The aim here is to dovetail public transportation with car travel.

== Offers ==
Mobility aims its subscriptions and offers at various target groups. The company launched its "Learner driver subscription" programme in 2013 for learner drivers and inexperienced motorists, for example. Private customers can become cooperative members or take out monthly subscriptions and benefit from additional advantages. Furthermore, they can register without subscription fees or obligations for "mobilityEASY".

Mobility offers two different products in the area of corporate mobility. "Business Car Sharing" allows companies to make use of Mobility cars – whether on a one-off basis or using exclusively reserved vehicles at the company's headquarters. Meanwhile, "Mobility Pool Car Sharing" involves existing corporate fleets being equipped with car sharing technology, thereby allowing a system of car sharing to be operated within the company. Other services such as claims management and maintenance are likewise integrated in the programme. A number of companies have outsourced their vehicle fleets to Mobility, either completely or partially. These include Migros (since 1998) and ABB.

== Environment ==
In 2024, the Mobility Cooperative commissioned an independent study to assess the traffic-reducing effects of car sharing. To this end, the consulting firm BSS Volkswirtschaftliche Beratung conducted a survey of members in cooperation with the University of Applied Sciences of Eastern Switzerland (OST). The result: on average, each Mobility car replaces 18 privately owned cars. Projected across the whole of Switzerland, around 40,000 fewer vehicles are thus on the road thanks to Mobility.

== Cooperative ventures ==
Mobility collaborates with various public transport companies: these provide parking spaces at railway stations and promote offers involving combined transport such as the Swiss Federal Railways, universities and companies.

== Subsidiaries ==
Through its subsidiary Mobility Systems + Services (founded in 2001 as Mobility Support AG), Mobility markets its booking system MobiSys 2.0, which it developed itself, as well as its expertise in the fields of fleet management and marketing.

In 2014 Mobility launched Switzerland's first free-floating car sharing programme called "Catch a Car" in Basel. Members could locate Catch-Cars via smartphone or on the website and drive from A to B without making a reservation in advance. ETH Zurich conducted a scientific investigation into how Catch a Car impacts on the mobility behaviour of individual members. In 2019, Mobility acquired Catch a Car in its entirety and integrated it into the Mobility system under the name ‘Mobility Go’. The offer in Geneva was discontinued in 2020. The offer in Basel was discontinued in June 2022.

== Objectives ==
In August 2020, the company announced that it would convert its vehicle fleet to electric cars by 2030.

Since 2020, Mobility customers have been able to voluntarily pay a climate contribution per trip into a fund, which is then doubled by the Mobility Cooperative. The measure is part of the Cause we Care initiative of the climate protection foundation myclimate, which ensures that the funds are used for their intended purpose. The fund is used to finance climate protection projects on the one hand and the conversion of the Mobility fleet to sustainable drive systems on the other.

== Criticism ==
In 2016, environmental organisations criticised the inclusion of Audi off-road vehicles in the fleet. In Bern, the Läbigi Stadt association was among those protesting. 'A car like this clearly contradicts the basic ecological principle of car sharing,' explains Nadine Masshardt. Nevertheless, more SUVs and saloon cars were added to the range in 2019: the Jaguar F-Pace, Land Rover Discovery Sport, Range Rover Velar, Jaguar XF and the Jaguar XE.
