= EPHA7 =

Protein-coding gene in humans

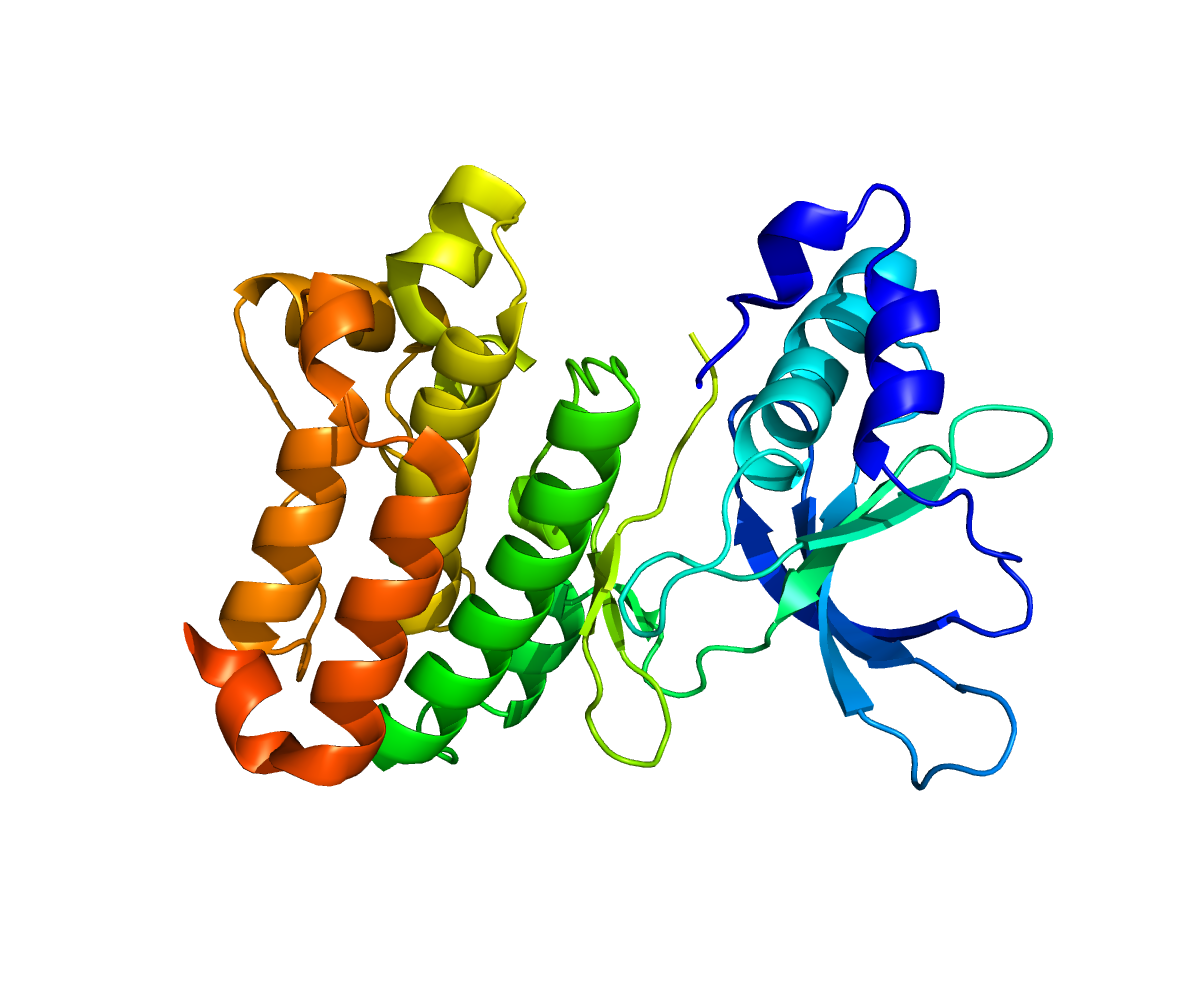

Identifiers
- Aliases: EPHA7, EHK-3, EHK3, EK11, HEK11, EPH receptor A7
- External IDs: OMIM: 602190; MGI: 95276; GeneCards: EPHA7
Available structures
PDB	Ortholog search: PDBe RCSB
PDB	List of PDB id codes 2REI, 3DKO, 3H8M, 3NRU
Enzyme activity
EC #	BRENDA	ExPASy	KEGG	MetaCyc
2.7.10.1	↗	↗	↗	↗

Gene location (Human)
Chr.	Chromosome 6 (human)
Band	6q16.1	Start	93,240,020 bp
Band	6q16.1	End	93,419,559 bp

Gene location (Mouse)
Chr.	Chromosome 4 (mouse)
Band	4 A4|4 12.42 cM	Start	28,813,131 bp
Band	4 A4|4 12.42 cM	End	28,967,499 bp
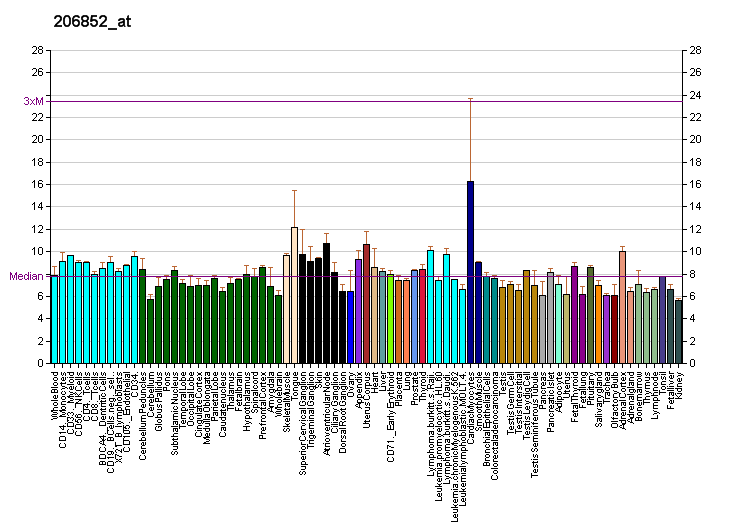
RNA expression pattern
Bgee	Human / Mouse (ortholog); Top expressed in: endothelial cell; Brodmann area 23; middle temporal gyrus; muscle layer of sigmoid colon; ganglionic eminence; ventricular zone; caput epididymis; primary visual cortex; gastric mucosa; epithelium of colon / Top expressed in: vestibular membrane of cochlear duct; dentate gyrus; Region I of hippocampus proper; hippocampus proper; dentate gyrus of hippocampal formation granule cell; CA3 field; genital tubercle; atrioventricular valve; habenula; atrium; More reference expression data
BioGPS	More reference expression data
Gene ontology
Molecular function	transferase activity; nucleotide binding; protein kinase activity; GPI-linked ephrin receptor activity; ephrin receptor binding; kinase activity; protein binding; transmembrane receptor protein tyrosine kinase activity; protein tyrosine kinase activity; ATP binding; axon guidance receptor activity; ephrin receptor activity; chemorepellent activity; receptor tyrosine kinase; transmembrane signaling receptor activity; transmembrane-ephrin receptor activity
Cellular component	integral component of membrane; postsynaptic membrane; membrane; neuromuscular junction; plasma membrane; integral component of plasma membrane; soma; dendrite; Schaffer collateral - CA1 synapse; hippocampal mossy fiber to CA3 synapse; glutamatergic synapse; integral component of postsynaptic specialization membrane; integral component of postsynaptic density membrane; cytoplasm; neuron projection; receptor complex
Biological process	apoptotic process; positive regulation of protein phosphorylation; regulation of protein autophosphorylation; phosphorylation; transmembrane receptor protein tyrosine kinase signaling pathway; ephrin receptor signaling pathway; negative regulation of synapse assembly; regulation of cysteine-type endopeptidase activity involved in apoptotic process; nervous system development; branching morphogenesis of a nerve; multicellular organism development; protein phosphorylation; negative regulation of collateral sprouting; positive regulation of neuron apoptotic process; brain development; nephric duct morphogenesis; regulation of cell-cell adhesion; regulation of ERK1 and ERK2 cascade; positive regulation of apoptotic process; peptidyl-tyrosine phosphorylation; regulation of peptidyl-tyrosine phosphorylation; retinal ganglion cell axon guidance; negative chemotaxis; regulation of postsynapse organization; negative regulation of signal transduction; cell differentiation; negative regulation of apoptotic process; positive regulation of ERK1 and ERK2 cascade; axon guidance
Sources:Amigo / QuickGO
Orthologs
Databases	NCBI: entry; OMA: entry
Species	Human	Mouse
Entrez	2045	13841
Ensembl	ENSG00000135333	ENSMUSG00000028289
UniProt	Q15375	Q61772
RefSeq (mRNA)	NM_001288629; NM_001288630; NM_004440	NM_001122889; NM_001290434; NM_010141
RefSeq (protein)	NP_001275558; NP_001275559; NP_004431; NP_001363394; NP_001363395 NP_001363396; NP_001363397; NP_001363398; NP_001363399; NP_001363400	NP_001116361; NP_001277363; NP_034271
Location (UCSC)	Chr 6: 93.24 – 93.42 Mb	Chr 4: 28.81 – 28.97 Mb
PubMed search
- Wikidata
View/Edit Human	View/Edit Mouse

Ephrin type-A receptor 7 is a protein that in humans is encoded by the EPHA7 gene.

This gene belongs to the ephrin receptor subfamily of the protein-tyrosine kinase family. EPH and EPH-related receptors have been implicated in mediating developmental events, particularly in the nervous system. Receptors in the EPH subfamily typically have a single kinase domain and an extracellular region containing a Cys-rich domain and 2 fibronectin type III repeats. The ephrin receptors are divided into 2 groups based on the similarity of their extracellular domain sequences and their affinities for binding ephrin-A and ephrin-B ligands.
