= Archizoom (EPFL) =

Architecture museum in Switzerland

Coordinates: 46.52124097°N 6.56439599°E

- Location: EPFL Campus
- Director: ENAC

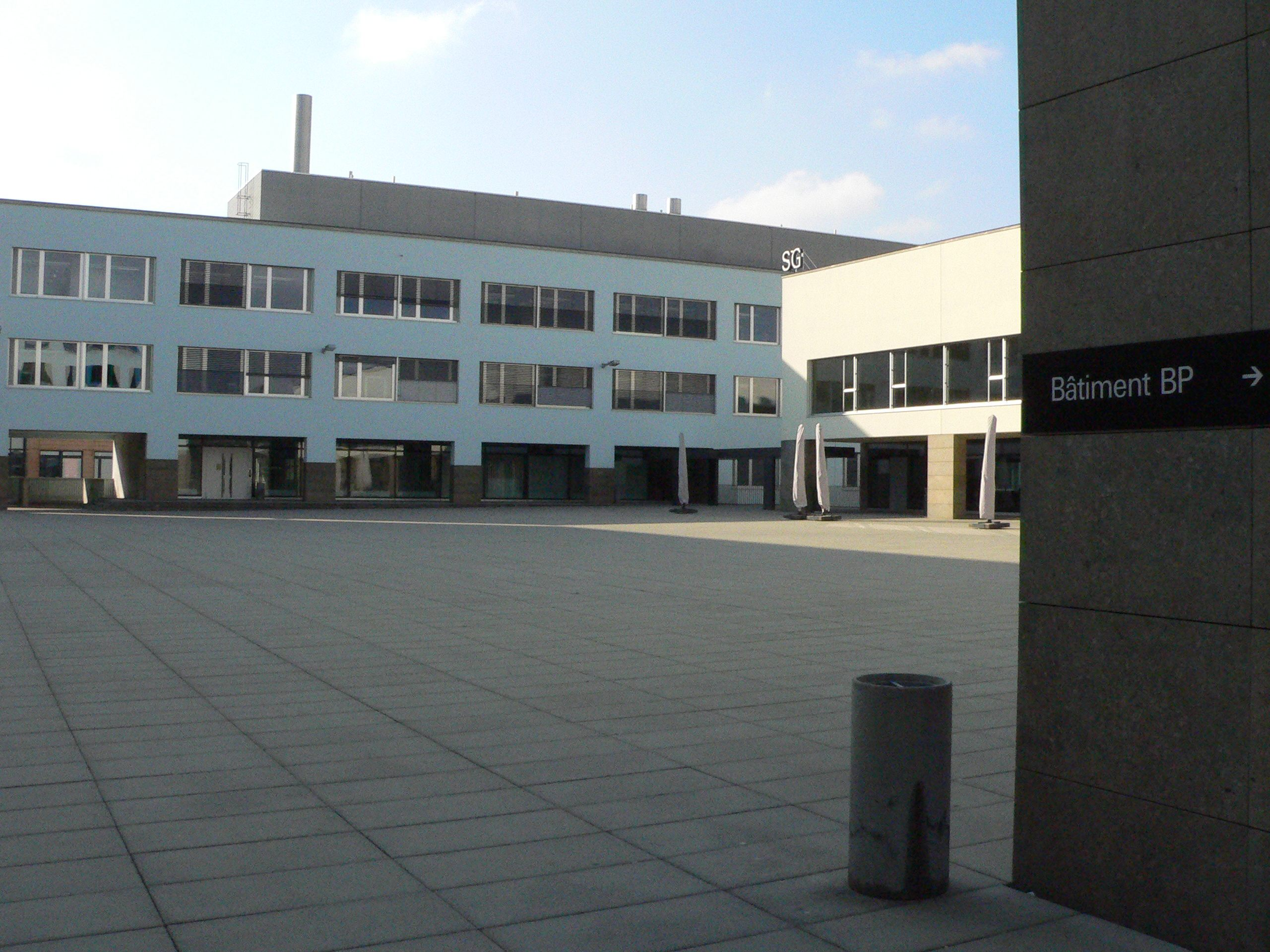
Archizoom is located in the SG building, on the campus of the École polytechnique fédérale de Lausanne.

Archizoom is an architecture museum settled on the campus of EPFL, in Lausanne, Switzerland. It provides a public programme of exhibitions, lectures and events for the ENAC Faculty.

== History ==
This programme was created in 1974 by Edith Bianchi, a graphic designer who wished to both complement education at the school of architecture and communicate about architecture to a general audience.

In 2007, with impetus from architect Harry Gugger, then associate of the firm Herzog & de Meuron and professor at the EPFL, the scope of the gallery was broadened and it was renamed Archizoom.

== Mission ==
Under the leadership of the new director and art historian Cyril Veillon, the Archizoom gallery focuses on the interdisciplinary aspects of the architecture and highlights its close relationship with art, science, engineering and the humanities. Borrowing architecture critic Paul Goldberger’s words, Archizoom’s programme addresses the question of ‘why architecture matters’.

== Exhibitions ==
Archizoom produces around 4-6 temporary exhibitions per year about international and regional architecture. Archives of all exhibitions since 1974 can be consulted on Archizoom website.

== Lectures ==
Archizoom hosts around 12-15 events (lectures, symposium, exhibition openings, guided visits, workshops for kids) per year related to the exhibitions and on the cultural dimension of the built environment. The lectures are usually recorded and broadcast on Archizoom YouTube channel.

== See also ==
- Lausanne campus
- List of museums in Switzerland
