= Lausanne University Hospital =

- Location within Switzerland

Geography
- Location: Lausanne, Vaud, Switzerland
- Coordinates: 46.524875°N 6.643273°E

Organisation
- Type: Teaching
- Affiliated university: University of Lausanne

Services
- Emergency department: Yes
- Beds: 1568

Helipads
- Helipad: Yes

Links
- Website: www.chuv.ch
- Lists: Hospitals in Switzerland

The Lausanne University Hospital (French: Centre hospitalier universitaire vaudois, CHUV), in Lausanne, is one of the five university hospitals in Switzerland.

The Lausanne University Hospital is linked to the Faculty of Biology and Medicine of the University of Lausanne (UNIL).

The CHUV's medical services benefit over 45,000 patients a year. Almost 3000 babies are born every year in the obstetrics department. Approximately 9000 employees work at the CHUV.

The university hospital acts as a general university hospital for people living in the Lausanne area, covering all areas of medical treatment. It also serves as a hospital offering acute and specialist care for the whole Canton of Vaud and also some neighbouring Cantons.

In 2021, like in the previous year, CHUV has been ranked as the 9th best hospital in the world by Newsweek Magazine. In 2019, the university hospital was rated as the leading hospital in Switzerland.

== Organisation ==
Departments of the University Hospital of Lausanne:

- Department of Emergency Medicine
- Department of Oncology (UNIL-CHUV)
- Department of Obstetric Gynaecology and Medical Genetics
- Department of the Musculoskeletal System
- Department of Education and Research (UNIL-CHUV)
- Department of Medicine
- Department of Psychiatry, see also Hospital of Cery
- Department of Medical Radiology
- Department of Interdisciplinary Centres and Medical Logistics
- Department of Laboratories
- Department of Clinical Neurosciences (there is a Department of Fundamental Neurosciences at the University of Lausanne)
- Department of Surgery and Anaesthesiology Services
- Department of Hospital Logistics
- Department of Community Medicine and Health

=== Main campus ===
The University Hospital of Lausanne is located in Lausanne, close to the centre of the city. It is served by the Lausanne Metro Line 2, from the "CHUV" station.

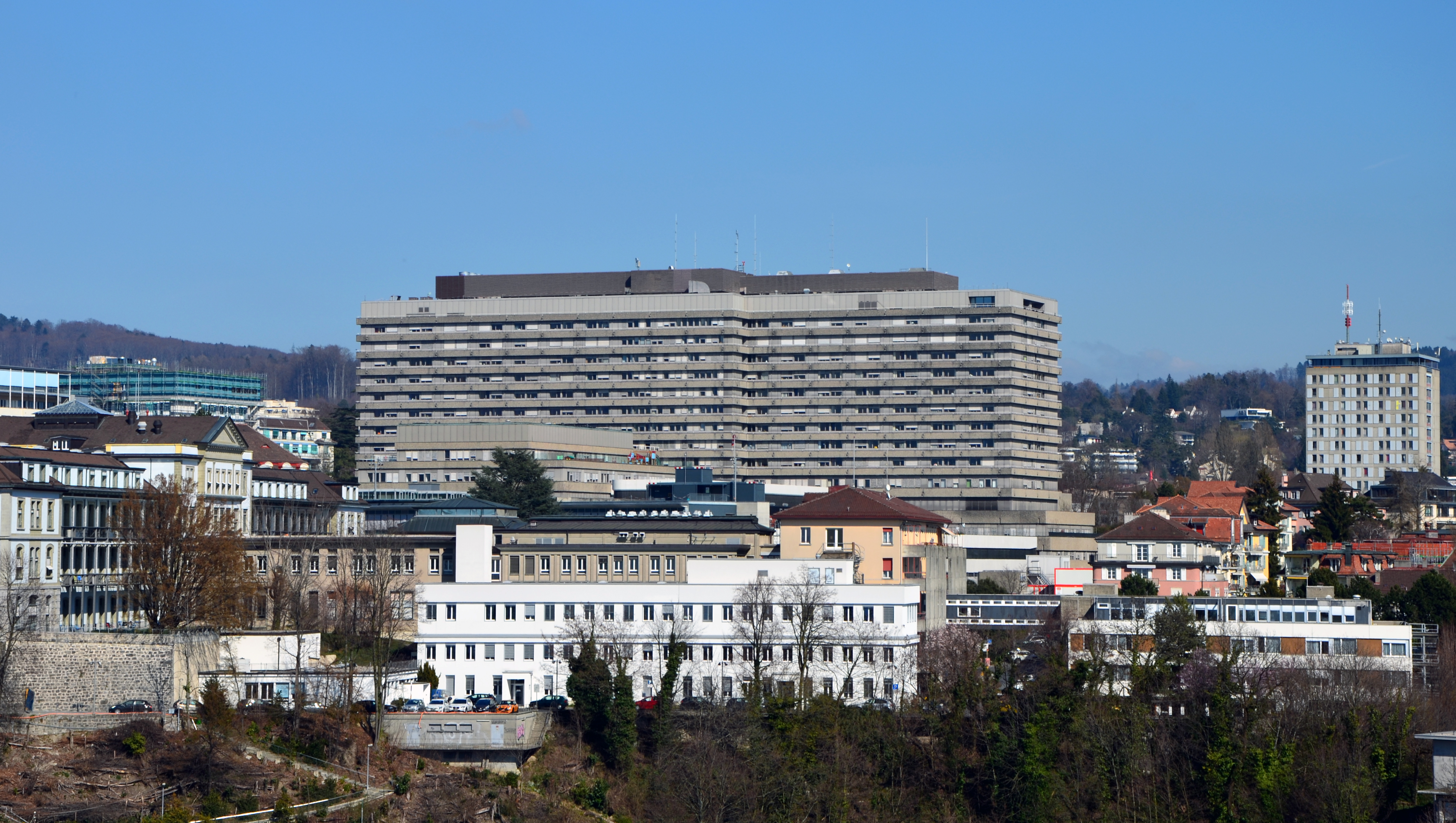
View of the main hospital building from the Cathedral

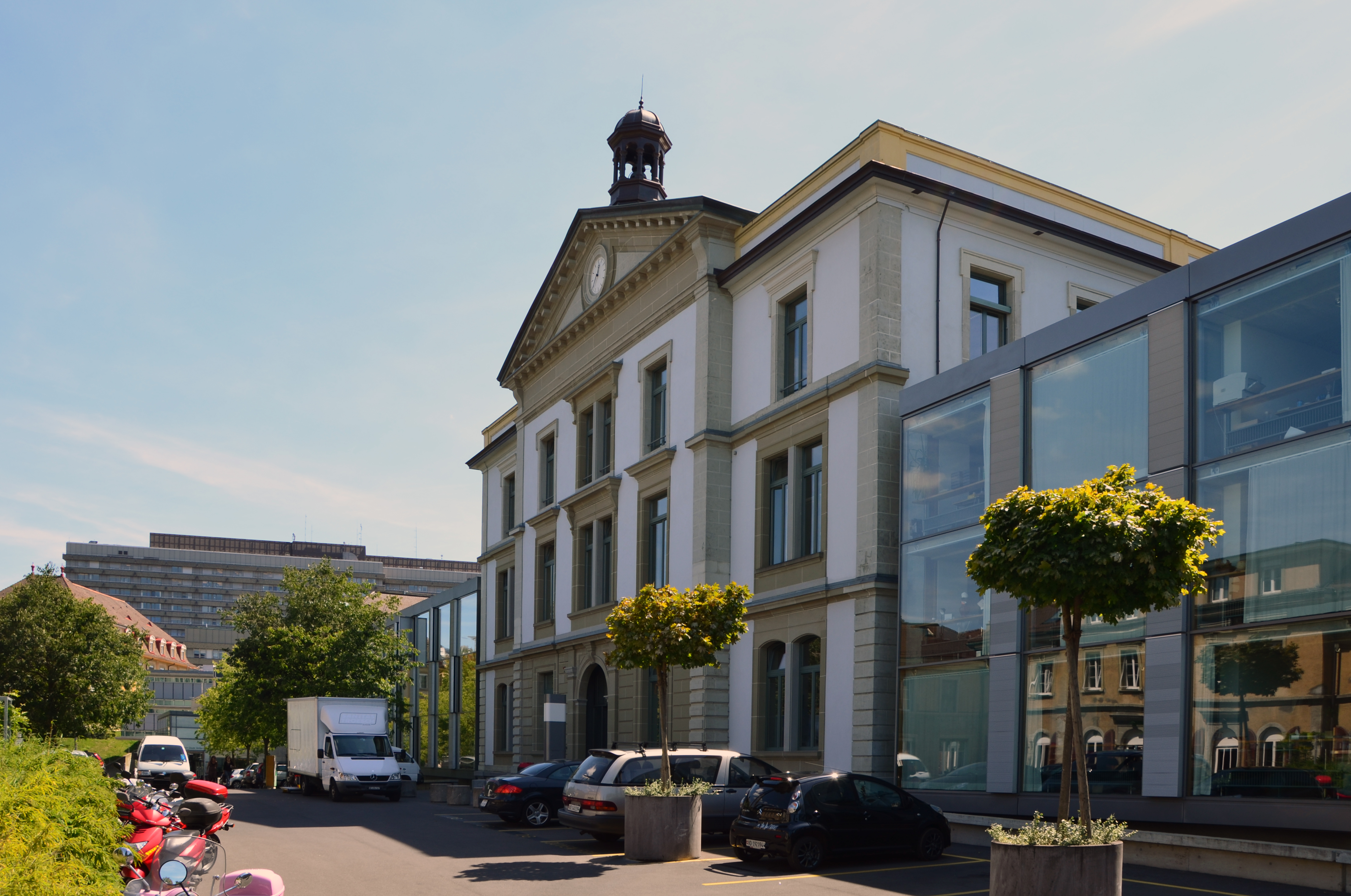
Bugnon 21, headquarters of the University Hospital of Lausanne and of the deanship of the Faculty of Biology and Medicine

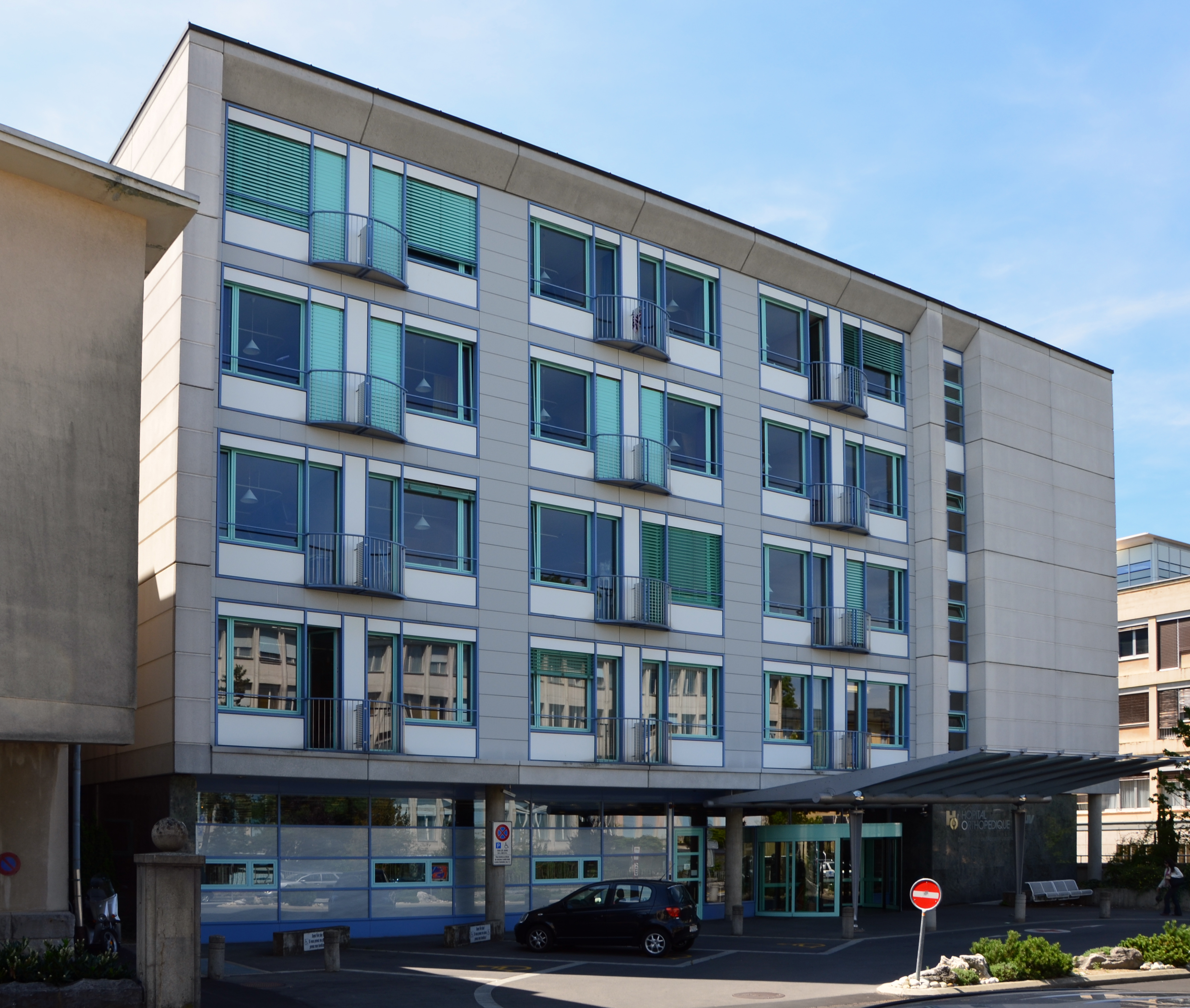
The west wing of the Orthopaedic Hospital

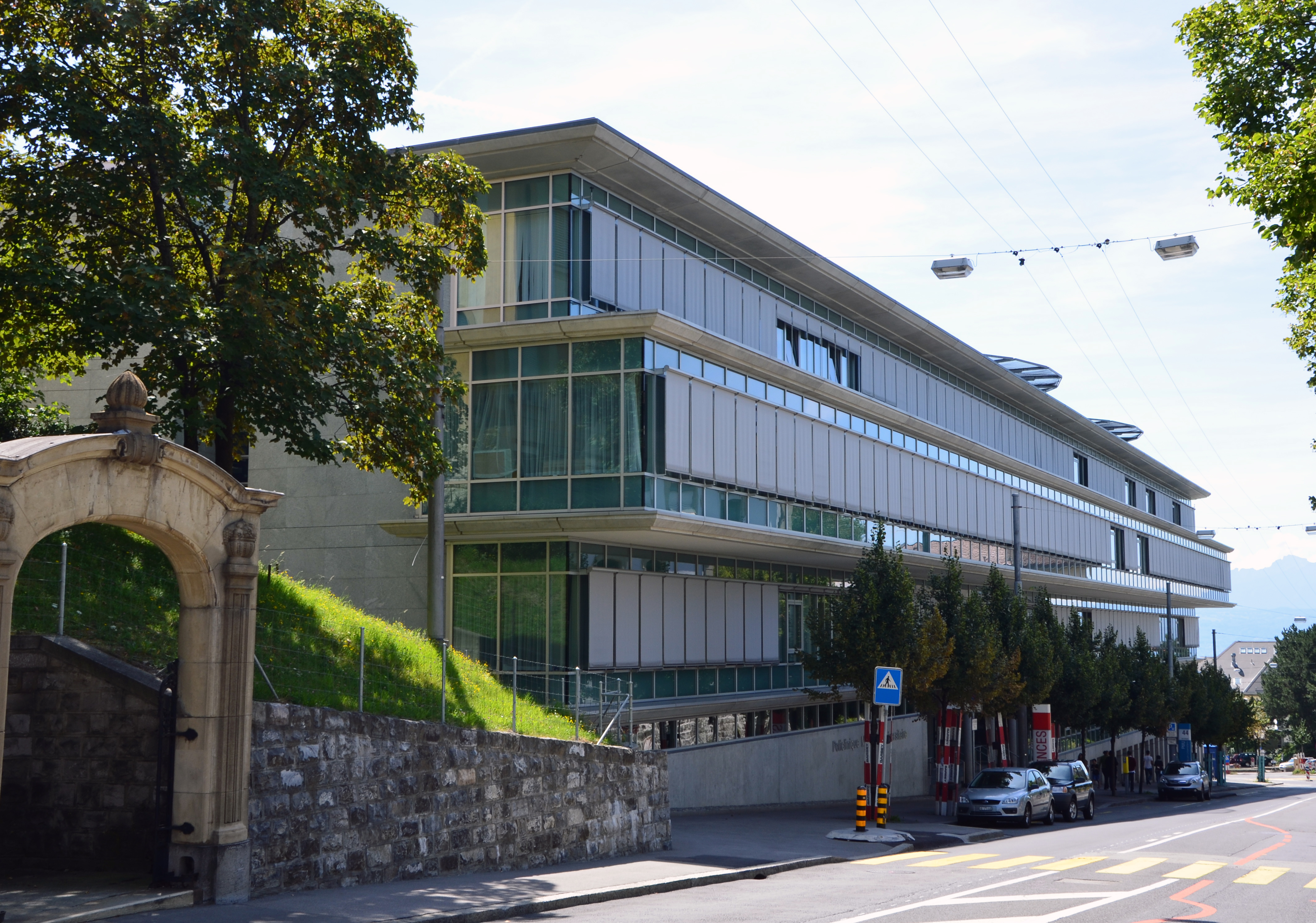
University Centre for Primary Care and Public Health (Unisanté), with two helipads on its roof

=== Other sites ===
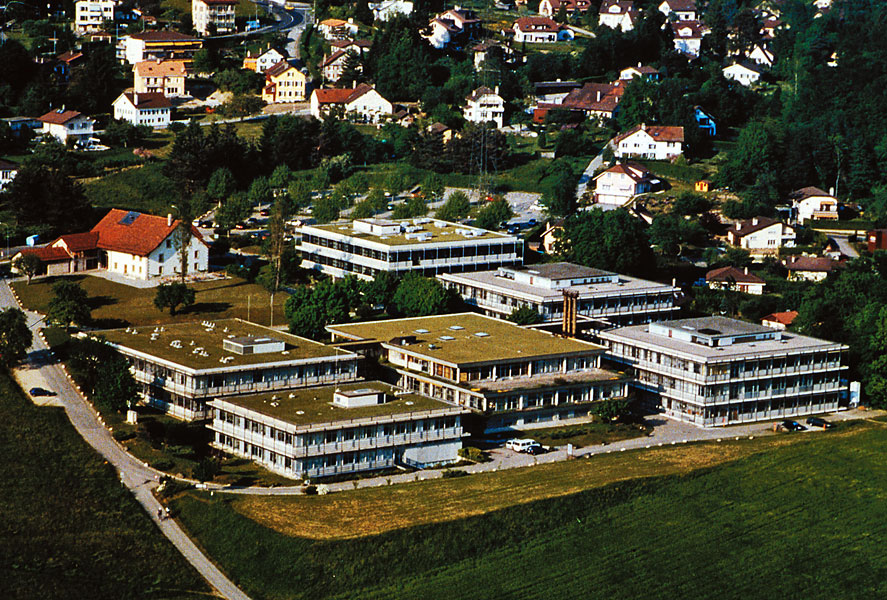
The Center for Immunology and Infection Lausanne (CIIL), UNIL-CHUV, in Épalinges, in 2007

Some laboratories are located in Épalinges (north of Lausanne), on a campus shared with the University of Lausanne and the Biopôle.

The Hospital of Cery, the psychiatric hospital of the University Hospital of Lausanne, is located in Prilly, in the urban area of Lausanne.

== Missions ==
The missions of the hospital are care to the patients, research and teaching.

On 28 October 2014, the World Health Organization welcomed approval by the Swiss Agency for Therapeutic Products of a vaccine trial against Ebola virus at the University Hospital of Lausanne.

The CHUV is part of the 'Lausanne Integrative Metabolism and Nutrition Alliance', a joint research initiative aiming to promote research and education on metabolism, nutrition, ageing and all associated diseases, such as obesity, diabetes or cancer, in Lausanne area.

== Magazine ==
The University Hospital of Lausanne publish In vivo, a free magazine aimed at a large audience (general public). It is produced by the Swiss media agency Large Network and published in French and English.

== Associated institutions ==
- Swiss Cancer Centre
- Ludwig Cancer Research
- Center for Biomedical Imaging (CIBM)
- Institut universitaire romand de santé au travail (IST)
- École romande de santé publique (ERSP)
- University Centre of Legal Medicine (CURML)
- Swiss Laboratory for Doping Analyses
- Biopôle
- Jules Gonin Eye Hospital

== See also ==
- List of university hospitals
- Lausanne campus
