= Ephrin receptor =

Protein family

Eph receptor ligand binding domain
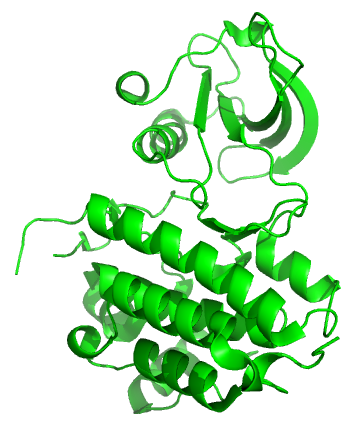
- Structure of the kinase domain of human eph type-A receptor 5 (EphA5)

Identifiers
- Symbol: Ephrin_lbd
- Pfam: PF01404
- InterPro: IPR016257
- SCOP2: 1nuk / SCOPe / SUPFAM
- CDD: cd10319
- Membranome: 1202
Available protein structures:
- PDB: IPR016257 PF01404 (ECOD; PDBsum)
- AlphaFold: IPR016257; PF01404

Eph receptors (Ephs, after erythropoietin-producing human hepatocellular receptors) are a group of receptors that are activated in response to binding with Eph receptor-interacting proteins (Ephrins). Ephs form the largest known subfamily of receptor tyrosine kinases (RTKs). Both Eph receptors and their corresponding ephrin ligands are membrane-bound proteins that require direct cell-cell interactions for Eph receptor activation. Eph/ephrin signaling has been implicated in the regulation of a host of processes critical to embryonic development including axon guidance, formation of tissue boundaries, cell migration, and segmentation. Additionally, Eph/ephrin signaling has been identified to play a critical role in the maintenance of several processes during adulthood including long-term potentiation, angiogenesis, and stem cell differentiation and cancer.

== Subclasses ==
Ephs can be divided into two subclasses, EphAs and EphBs (encoded by the genetic loci designated EPHA and EPHB respectively), based on sequence similarity and on their binding affinity for either the glycosylphosphatidylinositol-linked ephrin-A ligands or the transmembrane-bound ephrin-B ligands. Of the 16 Eph receptors (see above) that have been identified in animals, humans are known to express nine EphAs (EphA1-8 and EphA10) and five EphBs (EphB1-4 and EphB6). In general, Ephs of a particular subclass bind preferentially to all ephrins of the corresponding subclass, but have little to no cross-binding to ephrins of the opposing subclass. It has recently been proposed that the intrasubclass specificity of Eph/ephrin binding could be partially attributed to the different binding mechanisms used by EphAs and EphBs. There are exceptions to the intrasubclass binding specificity observed in Ephs, however, as it has recently been shown that ephrin-B3 can bind to and activate EphA4 and that ephrin-A5 can bind to and activate EphB2. EphA – ephrin-A interaction typically occur with higher affinity than EphB – ephrin-B interactions which can partially be attributed to the fact that ephrin-As bind via a "lock-and-key" mechanism that requires little conformational change of the EphAs in contrast to EphBs which utilize an "induced fit" mechanism that requires a greater amount of energy to alter the conformation of EphBs to bind to ephrin-Bs.

16 Ephs have been identified in animals and are listed below:

- EPHA1, EPHA2, EPHA3, EPHA4, EPHA5, EPHA6, EPHA7, EPHA8, EPHA9, EPHA10
- EPHB1, EPHB2, EPHB3, EPHB4, EPHB5, EPHB6

== Activation ==
The extracellular domain of Eph receptors is composed of a highly conserved globular ephrin ligand-binding domain, a cysteine-rich region and two fibronectin type III domains. The cytoplasmic domain of Eph receptors is composed of a juxtamembrane region with two conserved tyrosine residues, a tyrosine kinase domain, a sterile alpha motif (SAM), and a PDZ-binding motif. Following binding of an ephrin ligand to the extracellular globular domain of an Eph receptor, tyrosine and serine residues in the juxtamembrane region of the Eph become phosphorylated allowing the intracellular tyrosine kinase to convert into its active form and subsequently activate or repress downstream signaling cascades. The structure of the trans-autophosphorylation of the juxtamembrane region of EPHA2 has been observed within a crystal of EPHA2.

== Function ==
The ability of Ephs and ephrins to mediate a variety of cell-cell interactions places the Eph/ephrin system in an ideal position to regulate a variety of different biological processes during embryonic development.

=== Bi-directional signaling ===
Unlike most other RTKs, Ephs have a unique capacity to initiate an intercellular signal in both the receptor-bearing cell ("forward" signaling) and the opposing ephrin-bearing cell ("reverse" signaling) following cell-cell contact, which is known as bi-directional signaling. Although the functional consequences of Eph/ephrin bi-directional signaling have not been completely elucidated, it is clear that such a unique signaling process allows for ephrin Ephs to have opposing effects on growth cone survival and allows for the segregation of Eph-expressing cells from ephrin-expressing cells.

=== Segmentation ===
Segmentation is a basic process of embryogenesis occurring in most invertebrates and all vertebrates by which the body is initially divided into functional units. In the segmented regions of the embryo, cells begin to present biochemical and morphological boundaries at which cell behavior is drastically different – vital for future differentiation and function. In the hindbrain, segmentation is a precisely defined process. In the paraxial mesoderm, however, development is a dynamic and adaptive process that adjusts according to posterior body growth. Various Eph receptors and ephrins are expressed in these regions, and, through functional analysis, it has been determined that Eph signaling is crucial for the proper development and maintenance of these segment boundaries. Similar studies conducted in zebrafish have shown similar segmenting processes within the somites containing a striped expression pattern of Eph receptors and their ligands, which is vital to proper segmentation - the disruption of expression resulting in misplaced or even absent boundaries.

=== Axon guidance ===
As the nervous system develops, the patterning of neuronal connections is established by molecular guides that direct axons (axon guidance) along pathways by target and pathway derived signals. Eph/ephrin signaling regulates the migration of axons to their target destinations largely by decreasing the survival of axonal growth cones and repelling the migrating axon away from the site of Eph/ephrin activation. This mechanism of repelling migrating axons through decreased growth cone survival depends on relative levels of Eph and ephrin expression and allows gradients of Eph and ephrin expression in target cells to direct the migration of axon growth cones based on their own relative levels of Eph and ephrin expression. Typically, forward signaling by both EphA and EphB receptors mediates growth cone collapse while reverse signaling via ephrin-A and ephrin-B induces growth cone survival.

The ability of Eph/ephrin signaling to direct migrating axons along Eph/ephrin expression gradients is evidenced in the formation of the retinotopic map in the visual system, with graded expression levels of both Eph receptors and ephrin ligands leading to the development of a resolved neuronal map (for a more detailed description of Eph/ephrin signaling see "Formation of the Retinotopic Map" in ephrin). Further studies then showed the role of Eph's in topographic mapping in other regions of the central nervous system, such as learning and memory via the formation of projections between the septum and hippocampus.

In addition to the formation of topographic maps, Eph/ephrin signaling has been implicated in the proper guidance of motor neuron axons in the spinal cord. Although several members of Ephs and ephrins contribute to motor neuron guidance, ephrin-A5 reverse signaling has been shown to play a critical role in the survival of motor neuron growth cones and to mediate growth cone migration by initiating repellence in EphA-expressing migrating axons.

=== Cell migration ===
More than just axonal guidance, Ephs have been implicated in the migration of neural crest cells during gastrulation. In the chick and rat embryo trunk, the migration of crest cells is partially mediated by EphB receptors. Similar mechanisms have been shown to control crest movement in the hindbrain within rhombomeres 4, 5, and 7, which distribute crest cells to brachial arches 2, 3, and 4 respectively. In C. elegans a knockout of the vab-1 gene, known to encode an Eph receptor, and its Ephrin ligand vab-2 results in two cell migratory processes being affected.

=== Angiogenesis ===
Eph receptors are present in high degrees during vasculogenesis, angiogenesis, and other early development of the circulatory system. This development is disturbed without it. It is thought to distinguish arterial and venous endothelium, stimulating the production of capillary sprouts as well as in the differentiation of mesenchyme into perivascular support cells.

The construction of blood vessels requires the coordination of endothelial and supportive mesenchymal cells through multiple phases to develop the intricate networks required for a fully functional circulatory system. The dynamic nature and expression patterns of the Ephs make them, therefore, ideal for roles in angiogenesis. Mouse embryonic models show expression of EphA1 in mesoderm and pre-endocardial cells, later spreading up into the dorsal aorta then primary head vein, intersomitic vessels, and limb bud vasculature, as would be consistent with a role in angiogenesis. Different class A Eph receptors have also been detected in the lining of the aorta, brachial arch arteries, umbilical vein, and endocardium. Complementary expression of EphB2/ephrin-B4 was detected in developing arterial endothelial cells and EphB4 in venous endothelial cells. Expression of EphB2 and ephrin-B2 was also detected on supportive mesenchymal cells, suggesting a role in wall development through mediation of endothelial-mesenchymal interactions. Blood vessel formation during embryogenesis consists of vasculogenesis, the formation of a primary capillary network followed by a second remodeling and restructuring into a finer tertiary network - studies utilizing ephrin-B2 deficient mice showed a disruption of the embryonic vasculature as a result of a deficiency in the restructuring of the primary network. Functional analysis of other mutant mice have led to the development of a hypothesis by which Ephs and ephrins contribute to vascular development by restricting arterial and venous endothelial mixing, thus stimulating the production of capillary sprouts as well as in the differentiation of mesenchyme into perivascular support cells, an ongoing area of research.

=== Limb development ===
While there is currently little evidence to support this (and mounting evidence to refute it), some early studies implicated the Ephs to play a part in the signaling of limb development. In chicks, EphA4 is expressed in the developing wing and leg buds, as well as in the feather and scale primordia. This expression is seen in the distal end of the limb buds, where cells are still undifferentiated and dividing, and appears to be under the regulation of retinoic acid, FGF2, FGF4, and BMP-2 – known to regulate limb patterning. EphA4 defective mice do not present abnormalities in limb morphogenesis (personal communication between Andrew Boyd and Nigel Holder), so it is possible that these expression patterns are related to neuronal guidance or vascularisation of the limb with further studies being required to confirm or deny a potential role of Eph in limb development.

=== Cancer ===
As a member of the RTK family and with responsibilities as diverse as Ephs, it is not surprising to learn that the Ephs have been implicated in several aspects of cancer. While used extensively throughout development, Ephs are rarely detected in adult tissues. Elevated levels of expression and activity have been correlated with the growth of solid tumors, with Eph receptors of both classes A and B being over expressed in a wide range of cancers including melanoma, breast, prostate, pancreatic, gastric, esophageal, and colon cancer, as well as hematopoietic tumors. Increased expression was also correlated with more malignant and metastatic tumors, consistent with the role of Ephs in governing cell movement.

It is possible that the increased expression of Eph in cancer plays several roles, first, by acting as survival factors or as a promoter of abnormal growth. The angiogenic properties of the Eph system may increase vascularisation of and thus growth capacity of tumors. Second, elevated Eph levels may disrupt cell-cell adhesion via cadherin, known to alter expression and localisation of Eph receptors and ephrins, which is known to further disrupt cellular adhesion, a key feature of metastatic cancers. Third, Eph activity may alter cell matrix interactions via integrins by the sequestering of signaling molecules following Eph receptor activation, as well as providing potential adherence via ephrin ligand binding following metastasis.

== Discovery and history ==
The Eph receptors were initially identified in 1987 following a search for tyrosine kinases with possible roles in cancer, earning their name from the erythropoietin-producing hepatocellular carcinoma cell line from which their cDNA was obtained. These transmembranous receptors were initially classed as orphan receptors with no known ligands or functions, and it was some time before possible functions of the receptors were known.

When it was shown that almost all Eph receptors were expressed during various well-defined stages of development in assorted locations and concentrations, a role in cell positioning was proposed, initiating research that revealed the Eph/ephrin families as a principle cell guidance system during vertebrate and invertebrate development.
