= DENND11 =

Protein-coding gene in humans

Identifiers
- Aliases: DENND11, LCHN, PRO2561, KIAA1147, DENN domain containing 11
- External IDs: MGI: 2444256; GeneCards: DENND11

Gene location (Human)
Chr.	Chromosome 7 (human)
Band	7q34	Start	141,656,728 bp
Band	7q34	End	141,702,166 bp

Gene location (Mouse)
Chr.	Chromosome 6 (mouse)
Band	6|6 B1	Start	40,378,309 bp
Band	6|6 B1	End	40,413,069 bp
RNA expression pattern
Bgee	Human / Mouse (ortholog); Top expressed in: corpus callosum; ventricular zone; putamen; ganglionic eminence; amygdala; rectum; substantia nigra; hippocampus proper; caudate nucleus; islet of Langerhans / Top expressed in: lacrimal gland; lobe of cerebellum; cerebellar vermis; epithelium of lens; nucleus accumbens; substantia nigra; globus pallidus; primary motor cortex; deep cerebellar nuclei; prefrontal cortex; More reference expression data
BioGPS	n/a
Orthologs
Databases	NCBI: entry; OMA: entry
Species	Human	Mouse
Entrez	57189	243780
Ensembl	ENSG00000262599; ENSG00000257093	ENSMUSG00000037172
UniProt	A4D1U4	Q3UHG7
RefSeq (mRNA)	NM_001080392	NM_175528; NM_001356375; NM_133929
RefSeq (protein)	NP_001073861	NP_001343304
Location (UCSC)	Chr 7: 141.66 – 141.7 Mb	Chr 6: 40.38 – 40.41 Mb
PubMed search
- Wikidata
View/Edit Human	View/Edit Mouse

DENN domain-containing protein 11 is a protein that in humans is encoded by the DENND11 gene (previously KIAA1147). It is part of the tripartite DENN domain family of proteins that often function as Rab-GEFs to regulate vesicular trafficking. Both the mRNA and protein have been shown to be upregulated following ischemic stroke, and to be produced at altered levels in patients with FTD-ALS, however the gene's contribution to these states is not well understood.

== Gene ==
KIAA1147 is located on the 7th chromosome in humans from bases 141652381-141702188 on the negative strand. Additional names for KIAA1147 include PRO25611, AI841796 in the mouse and RGD1563986 in the rat. Only one mRNA transcript of KIAA1147 has been reported in NCBI, and is composed of 9 exons.

== Protein ==
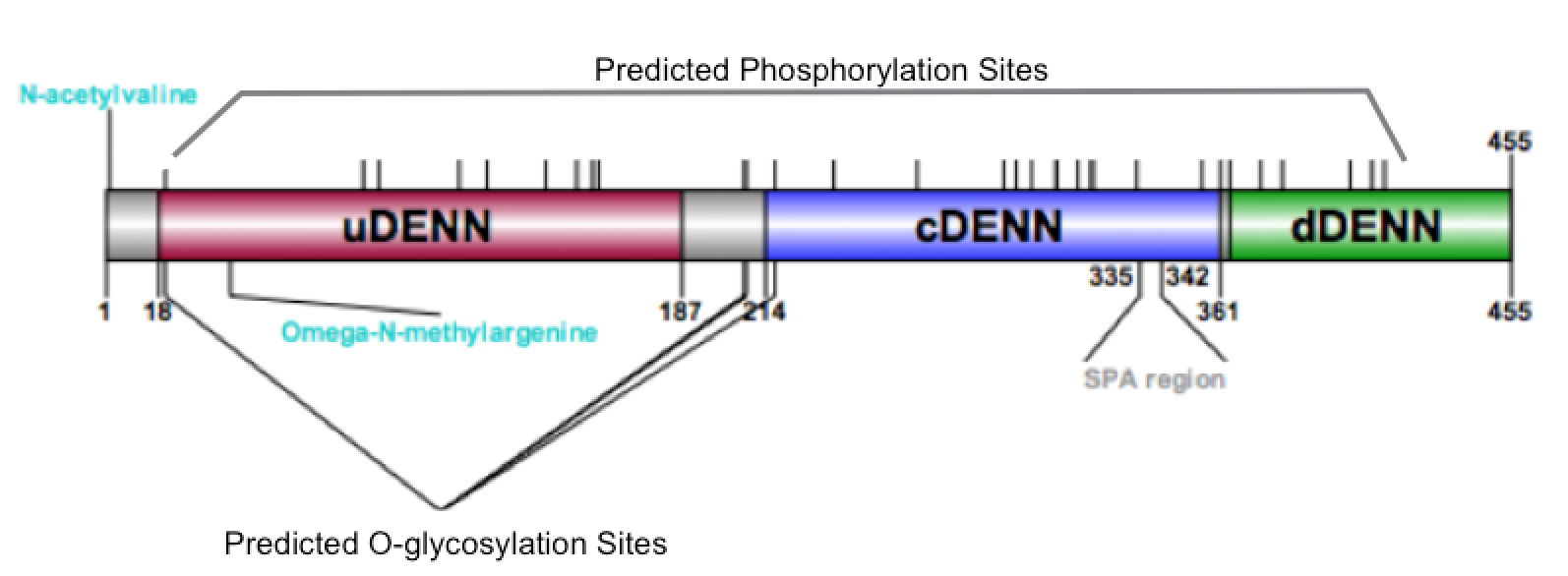

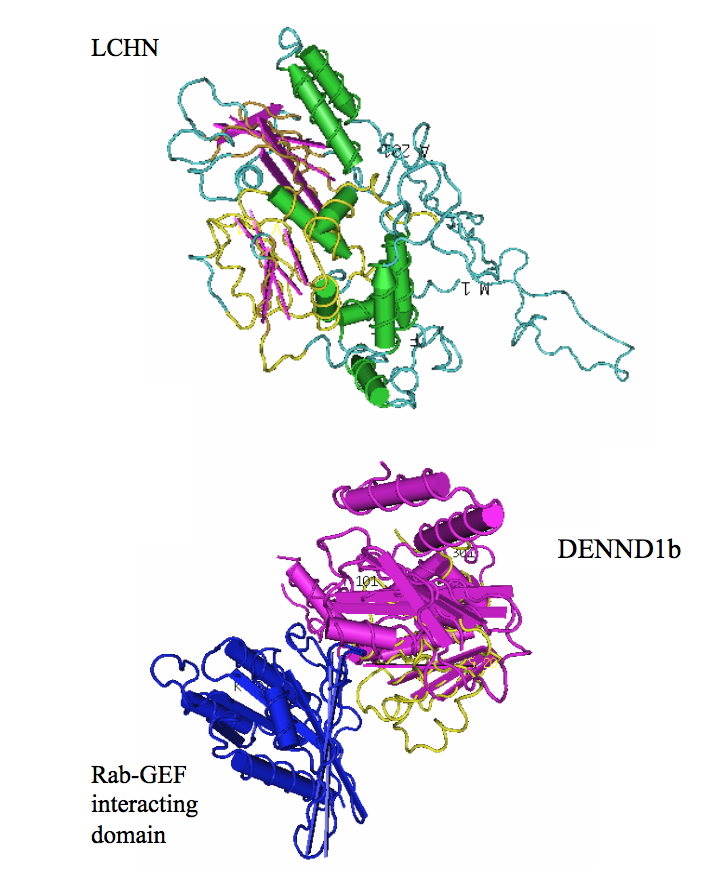
Protein LCHN and DENND1b, with cDENN domain highlighted to show similarity in secondary and tertiary structure

Human LCHN is a cytoplasmic protein composed of 455 amino acids predicted to be 51.4 kD before modifications with isoelectric point of 5.06. The majority of its 455 amino acids make up the tripartite DENN domains which are commonly found in proteins that act as Rab-GEFs and regulate vesicular trafficking. LCHN has several predicted phosphorylation sites and contains many motifs for kinase binding. The uDENN and cDENN domains of LCHN are predicted to be primarily coil, while the dDENN domain is predicted to be a combination of alpha helix and beta sheet. The cDENN domain is the most highly conserved domain within DENN family proteins, and is also primarily coil in protein DENND1B, which has been crystallized and confirmed to interact with the guanine nucleotide exchange domain of Rab-35. LCHN also contains a Stability of Polarity Axis (SPA) region. that may allow it to play a role in cell division.

== Expression ==
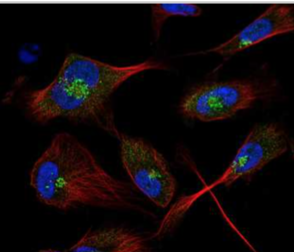
Immunohistochemistry shows localization of LCHN to cytoplasmic face of Golgi apparatus

=== Tissues ===
The Human Protein Atlas reports high levels of KIAA1147 transcription in several brain regions including cerebral cortex, cerebellum, and retina, as well as non-brain regions including spleen, thymus, stomach, prostate, lung, and ascending colon. Immunohistochemistry has shown LCHN to be localized to the cytoplasmic face of the Golgi apparatus in cell culture, and the brain in mouse fetal development. In the adult mouse and human brain, LCHN is expressed relatively ubiquitously. Expression of LCHN has been shown to increase in response to chronic alcoholism, immature and mature dendritic response to hypoxia, and ischemic stroke.

=== Transcriptional regulation ===
There are binding sites for two main groups of transcription factors in the predicted promoter of KIAA1147. The first group consists of elements related to the cell cycle and neuronal development and includes AP-2, NRF1, BRAC, E2F, NEUR, and NRSF. The second consists of elements related to brain insult, including HIFF (hypoxia inducible factor), CREB (cAMP responsive factor linked to ER stress response), GREF (glucocorticoid responsible factor), HEAT (heat shock responsive factor), and HDBP (Huntington's disease regulatory binding protein). In patients with FTD-ALS, there has been reported abnormal upstream CpG methylation of KIAA1147

== Interacting proteins ==
=== SETBP1 ===
Yeast two-hybrid assays have shown LCHN to physically interact with SETBP1, a protein that contains 3 nuclear localization signals. Despite the lack of a predicted nuclear localization signal in its own sequence, this interaction suggests that LCHN may be able to enter and have functional importance in the nucleus.

=== TGOLN2 ===
In affinity chromatography studies, LCHN has been reported to have a physical association with TGOLN2, a surface protein of the Golgi apparatus. This likely explains immunohistochemical finding of strong LCHN localization near the Golgi apparatus despite being a predicted cytoplasmic protein.

=== Kallikreins ===
Affinity chromatography studies have also reported a physical association between LCHN and kallikreins KLK5 and KLK11, serine proteases. It is possible that cleavage by these proteases may be relevant to LCHN's function.

=== EFNB3 ===
LCHN has been reported to be capable of a physical association with EFNB3, an ephrin receptor ligand with reported importance in neuronal development. This, coupled with the high expression of LCHN in the developing central nervous system, suggests that binding of LCHN to EFNB3 may modulate neuronal development.

== Predicted function ==
=== Neuronal insult ===
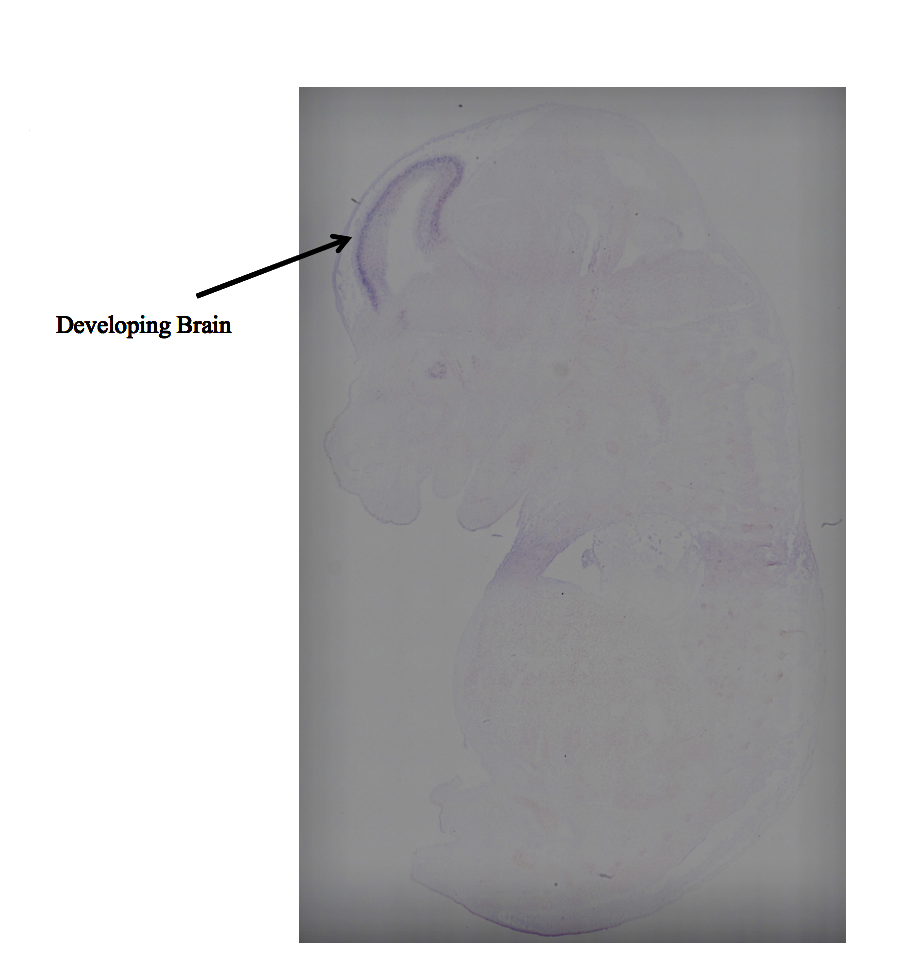
LCHN is localized to the developing mouse brain

LCHN expression has been reported to be unregulated following ischemic stroke, chronic alcoholism, and cell culture responses of immature and mature dendrites to prolonged hypoxia. Additionally, decreased expression as a result of CpG methylation has been implicated to be pathogenic in patients with FTD-ALS. Within the predicted promoter of KIAA1147, there are predicted binding sites for hypoxia response elements that would accompany ischemic stroke, heat shock proteins, factors related to the glucocorticoid mediated stress response, and cAMP responsive factors related to the ER stress response. Due to the reported evidence of LCHN upregulation following ischemic stroke, which often results in neuronal damage or death, as well presence of several binding sites for factors induced by rapid trauma to the brain, it is likely that KIAA1147 plays a role in the brain’s response to sudden stress and injury.

=== Neuronal development ===
The presence of the SPA domain within LCHN suggests that it may play a role in cell division. LCHN has been shown to physically associate with EFNB3, a protein with reported importance in neuronal development. A second reported association with SETBP1 may open up the possibility for LCHN to play a role in cell cycle regulation from within the nucleus. The predicted KIAA1147 promoter contains binding sites for cell-division related factors and factors known to have specific expression during neuronal development. RNA in situ hybridization has shown KIAA1147 to be located at high levels in the developing brain. Together, these data suggest that LCHN plays a role in regulating cellular division during development of the brain.

== Clinical significance ==
LCHN has been shown to be upregulated following a number of insults to the brain including the response to chronic alcoholism, immature and mature dendritic response to hypoxia, and ischemic stroke. Recent studies have implicated abnormal CpG methylation of LCHN in FTD-ALS. No disease causing SNPs in LCHN have been reported with high frequency.

== Homology ==
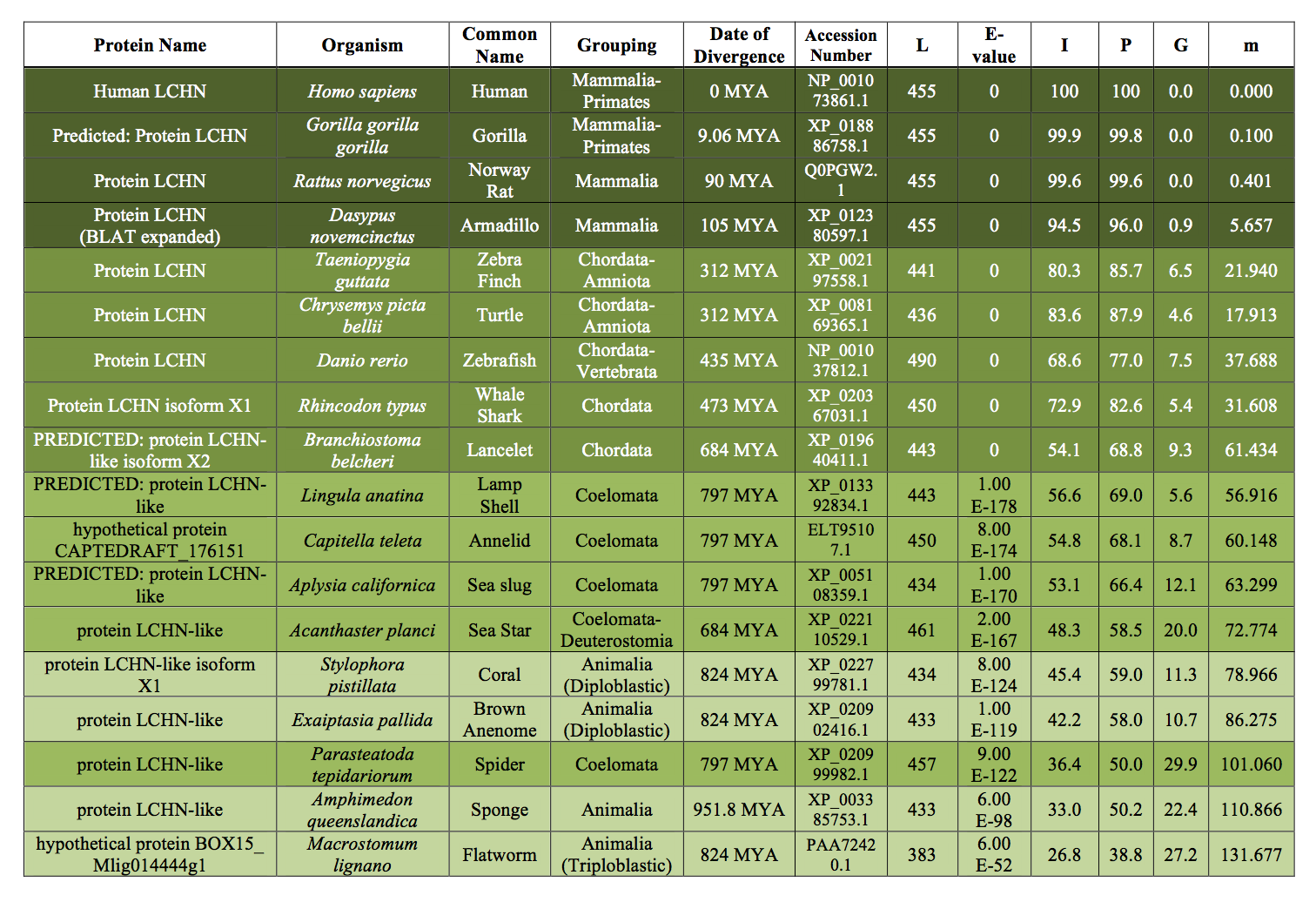
Animalian LCHN Orthologs

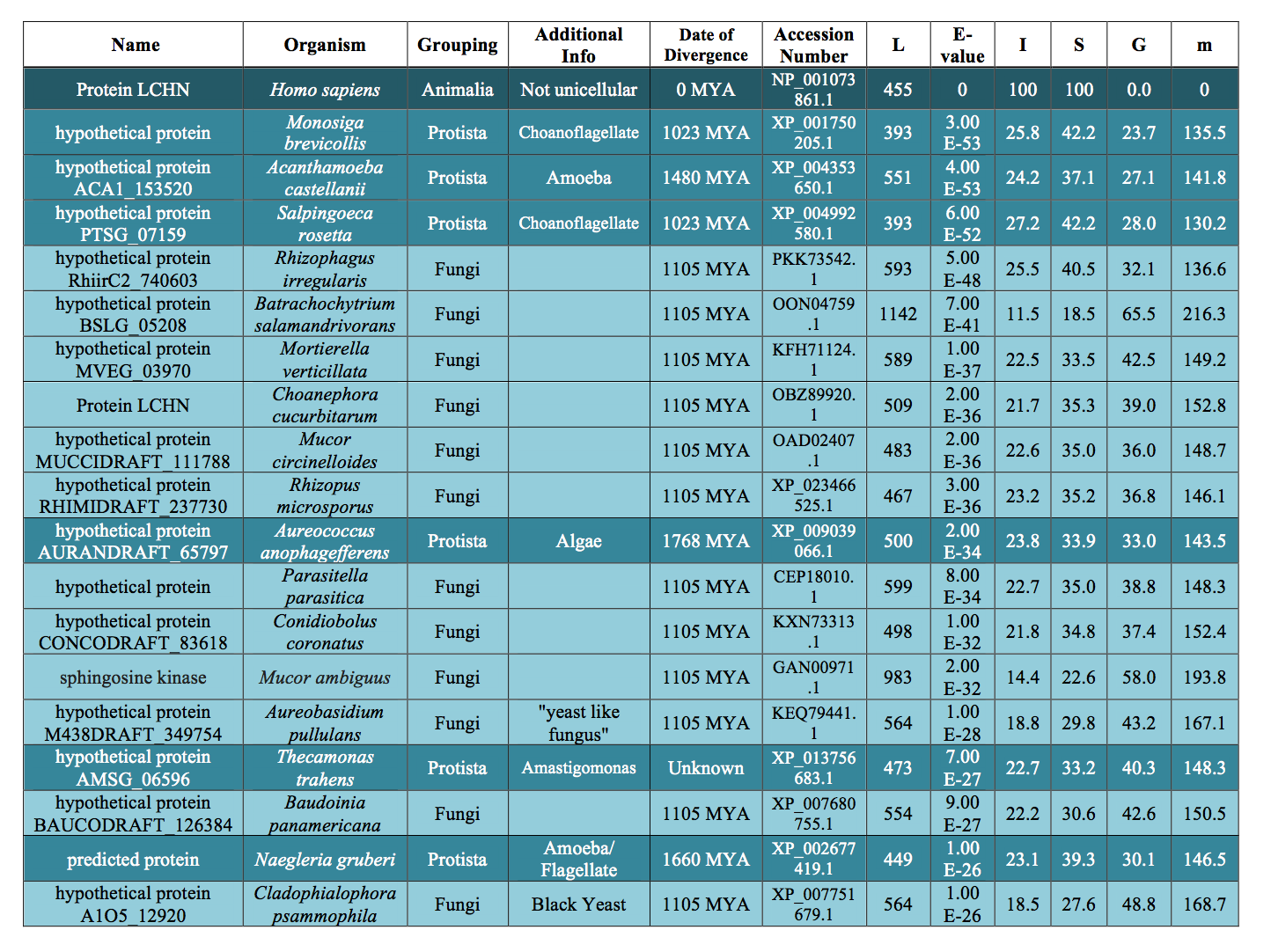
Non-Animalian LCHN Orthologs

There are no reported paralogs of LCHN in humans. LCHN homologs exist in animals dating back to the earliest sponges, with a notable lack of reported expression in Drosophila and C. elegans. There are also a number of LCHN homologs in protists including choanoflagellates, amoeba, and algae, as well as other unicellular eukaryotes including fungi.
