= FAM221B =

Protein-coding gene in the species Mus musculus

Identifiers
- Aliases: FAM221B, C9orf128, family with sequence similarity 221 member B
- External IDs: MGI: 2441678; GeneCards: FAM221B

Gene location (Human)
Chr.	Chromosome 9 (human)
Band	9p13.3	Start	35,816,391 bp
Band	9p13.3	End	35,828,747 bp

Gene location (Mouse)
Chr.	Chromosome 4 (mouse)
Band	4|4 A5	Start	43,659,622 bp
Band	4|4 A5	End	43,669,145 bp
RNA expression pattern
Bgee	Human / Mouse (ortholog); Top expressed in: testicle; left testis; right testis; right uterine tube; granulocyte; salivary gland; olfactory zone of nasal mucosa; minor salivary glands; bone marrow; prostate / Top expressed in: seminiferous tubule; spermatid; primary oocyte; secondary oocyte; zygote; yolk sac; spermatocyte; external carotid artery; internal carotid artery; granulocyte; More reference expression data
BioGPS	n/a
Orthologs
Databases	NCBI: entry; OMA: entry
Species	Human	Mouse
Entrez	392307	242408
Ensembl	ENSG00000204930	ENSMUSG00000043633
UniProt	A6H8Z2	Q8C627
RefSeq (mRNA)	NM_001012446	NM_175517
RefSeq (protein)	NP_001012448	NP_780726
Location (UCSC)	Chr 9: 35.82 – 35.83 Mb	Chr 4: 43.66 – 43.67 Mb
PubMed search
- Wikidata
View/Edit Human	View/Edit Mouse

FAM221B is a protein that in humans is encoded by the FAM221B gene. FAM221B is also known by the alias C9orf128, is expressed at low level, and is defined by 17 GenBank accessions. It is predicted to function in transcription regulation as a transcription factor.

== Gene ==
=== Locus ===
FAM221B can be found around the end of the short arm of human chromosome 9.

General position of FAM221B on Human Chromosome 9 (marked by red line)

Gene neighborhood of FAM221B

=== Expression patterns ===
FAM221B is expressed at low levels in human and mouse tissues. Expression is highest in germ cell tissues and cells. This differential expression is most pronounced in testes tissue. Compared to Homo sapiens, Mus musculus shows more differential expression of FAM221B in testes tissue. Mature beta cells express FAM221B at higher rates than do fetal beta cells.

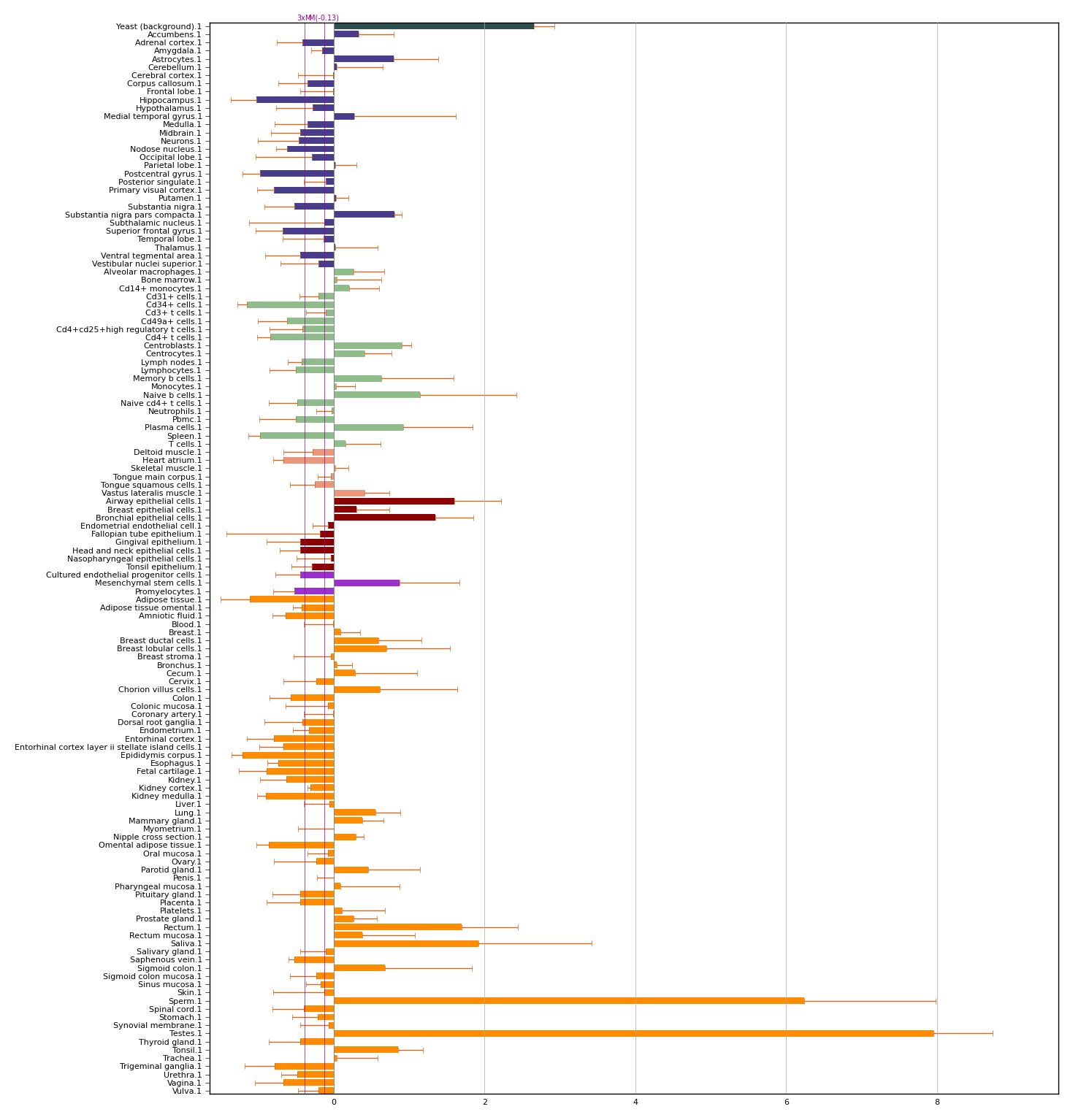
FAM221B expression for BioGPS dataset in various tissues in Homo sapiens

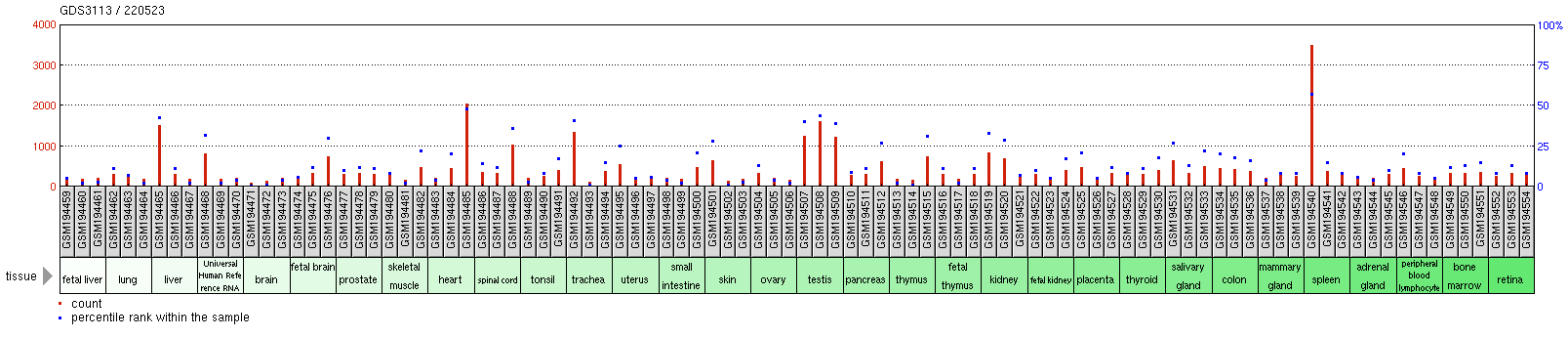
FAM221B expression for GEO dataset GDS 3113 in various tissues in Homo sapiens

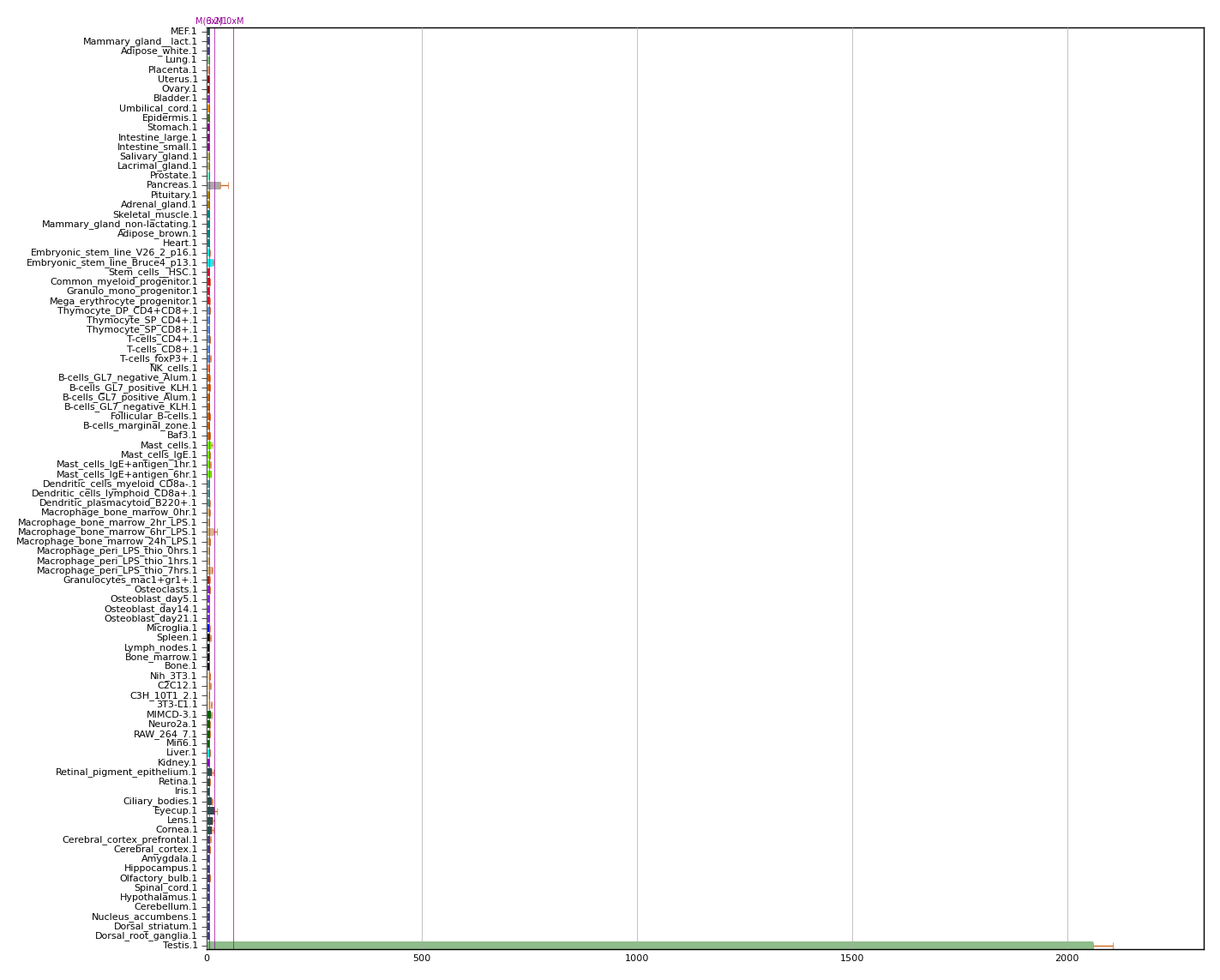
FAM221B expression for BioGPS dataset in various tissues in Mus musculus

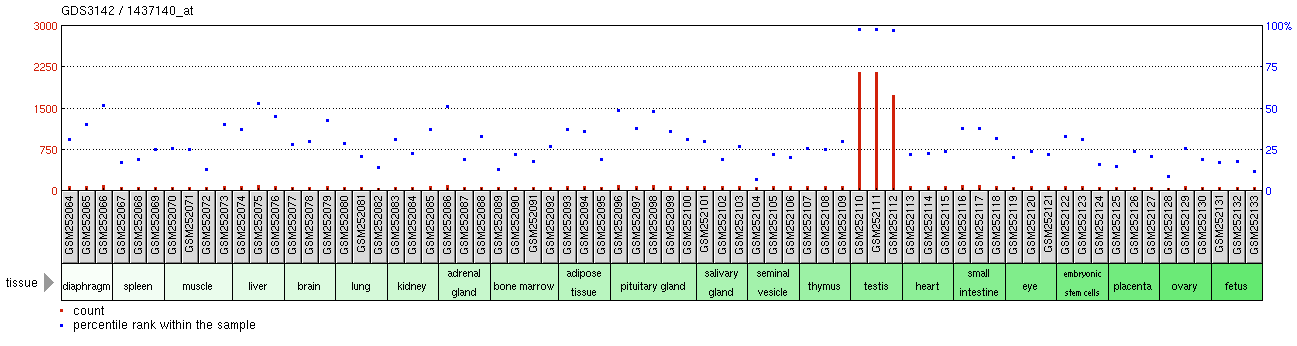
FAM221B expression for GEO dataset GDS 3142 in various tissues in Mus musculus

== mRNA ==
=== Alternative splicing and isoforms ===
FAM221B has a total of 5 transcript variants: the putative sequence, Isoform X1, Isoform X2, Isoform X3, and Isoform X4. Isoform X4 does not exist in humans but is found in various primates.

=== Exons ===
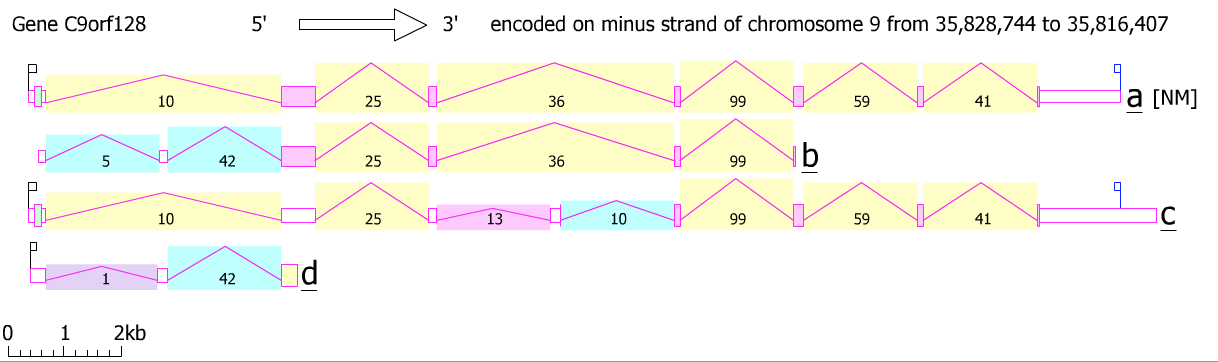
Various FAM221B spliced isoforms and their exons as shown in AceView

There are a total of six exons in the putative sequence of FAM221B. However, a total of seven exons exist for FAM221B, as the seventh exon is an alternative exon.

== Protein ==
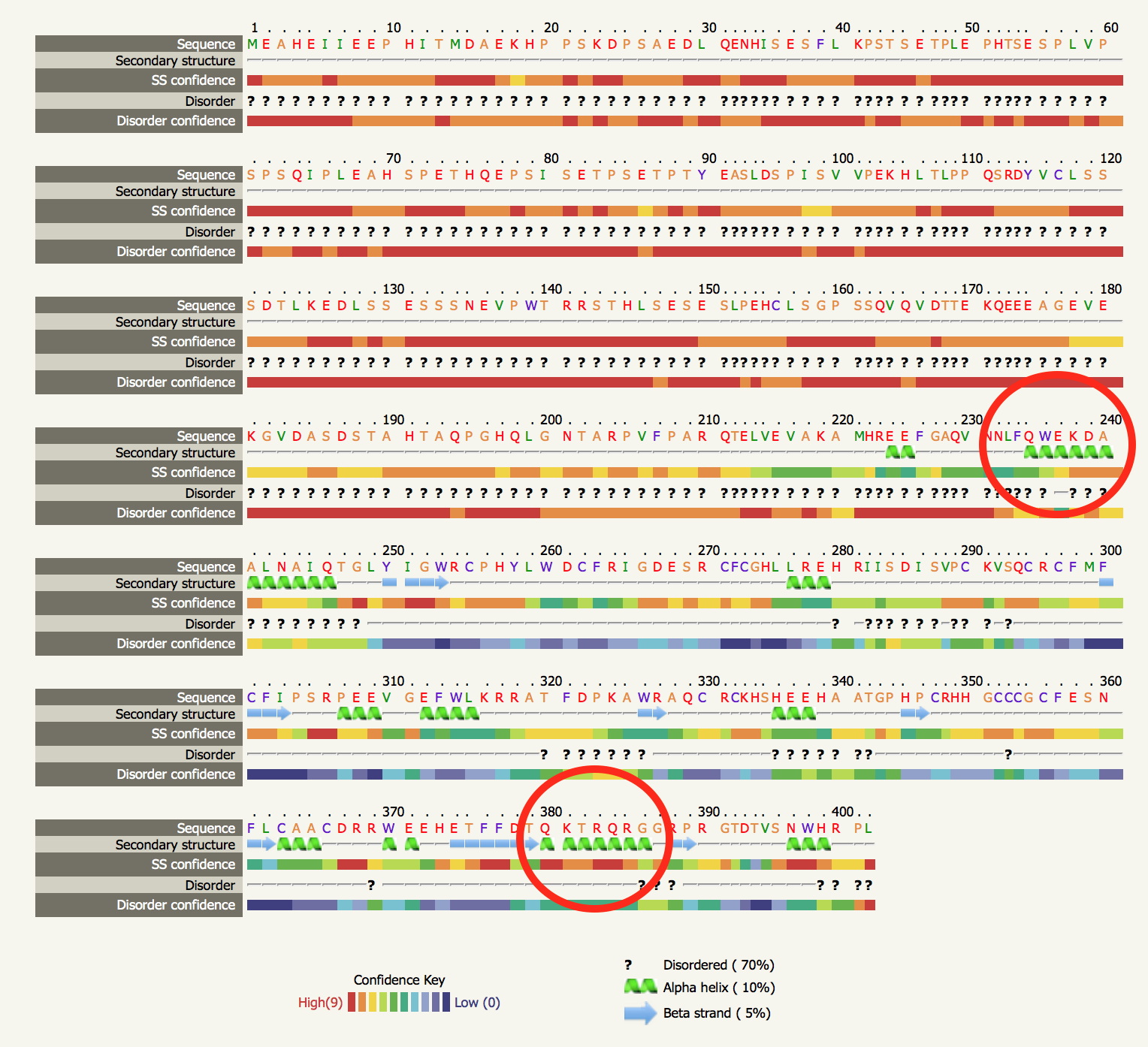
PHYRE2 prediction for FAM221B secondary structure with alpha-helix regions with strongest evidence for presence circled in red.

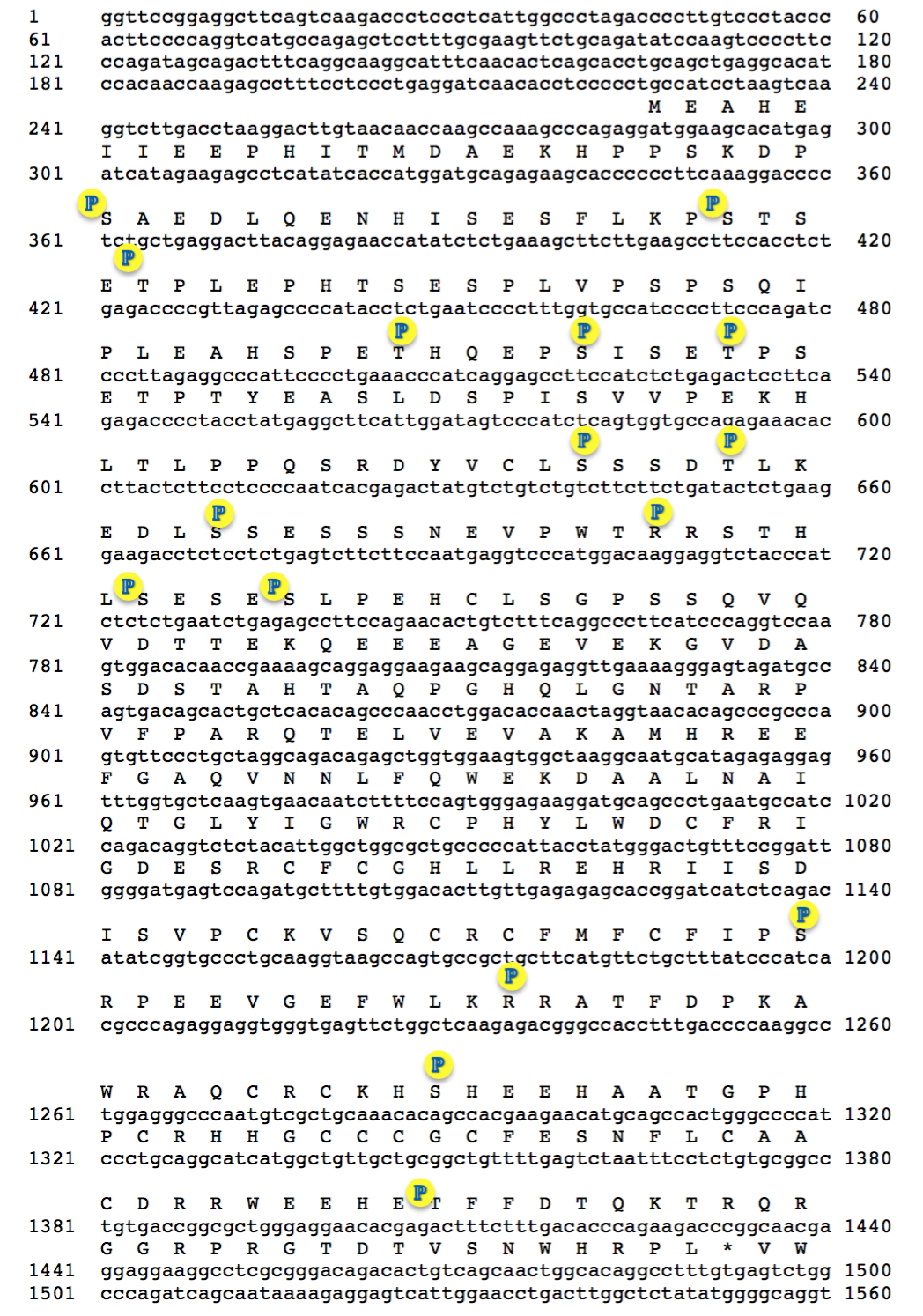
Predicted phosphorylation sites annotated on FAM221B transcript determined by analysis of various program outputs.

=== General characteristics ===
The putative sequence for FAM221B is 402 amino acids long and weighs 45.4 kilodaltons. Amino acids expressed at abnormal rates include Histidine, Cysteine, Glutamic acid, and Tyrosine. When compared to typical proteins, FAM221B expresses Histidine at a much higher frequency at 6.0% of protein, Cysteine at a slightly higher frequency at 4.7% of protein, Glutamic acid at a slightly higher frequency at 11.4% of protein, and Tyrosine at a slightly lower frequency at 1.0% of protein. The isoelectric point of FAM221B is 5.264, suggesting FAM221B is an acidic protein at a normal physiological pH (7.4). There is strong evidence that FAM221B is a protein found within the nucleus.

=== Compositional features ===
FAM221B is predicted to have two distinct alpha helices in its secondary structure. Secondary structure predicting programs predict beta sheets but are not as consistent as the two alpha helices.

=== Post-translational modifications ===
FAM221B is predicted to have a high number of phosphorylation sites.

=== Protein interactions ===
There is evidence that FAM221B interacts with the proteins Autophagy related 13 (KIAA0652), RB1-inducible coiled-coil 1 (RB1CC1), and Ephrin-B3 (EFNB3). These proteins are predicted to be localized in the nucleus at the same confidence level as FAM221B.

== Homology and evolution ==
FAM221B is conserved in Eutheria. However, both orthologous and paralogous transcripts predating ancestral Boroeutheria can be found.

=== Paralogs ===
One paralog exists for FAM221B in humans: FAM221A. FAM221A and FAM221B's ancestral gene is predicted to have diverged in prokarya.

Gene name	Accession number	Sequence length (aa)	Sequence identity to human protein	Sequence similarity to human protein	Notes
FAM221A	NP_954587.2	402	28%	46%	Exists in other organisms

=== Orthologs ===
Genus and species	Common name	Divergence from human liineage (MYA)	Accession number	Sequence length (aa)	Sequence identity to human protein	Sequence similarity to human protein
Rhinopithecus roxellana	Golden Snub-nosed Monkey	29.1	XP_010374448.1	402	92%	95%
Saimiri boliviensis	Black-capped Squirrel Monkey	43.1	XP_003943837.1	402	92%	93%
Tsuga chinensis	Chinese Tree Shrew	85.9	XP_006143215.1	518	78%	88%
Cavia porcellus	Guinea Pig	90.9	XP_003470749.1	415	72%	83%
Odobenus rosmarus divergens	Pacific Walrus	97.5	XP_004392324.1	398	72%	81%
Orcinus orca	Killer Whale	97.5	XP_004271469.1	410	70%	78%
Felis catus	Feral Cat	97.5	XP_006939339.1	429	68%	75%
Loxodonta africana	African Bush Elephant	105	XP_003407335.1	414	66%	78%
Ornithorhynchus anatinus	Platypus	179.2	XP_007656406.1	262	65%	75%
Anolis carolinensis	Carolina Anole	320.5	XP_008122390.1	550	63%	69%
Thamnophis sirtalis	Common Garter Snake	320.5	XP_013924342.1	411	62%	74%
Lepisosteus oculatus	Alligator Gar	429.6	XP_015222126.1	272	62%	74%
Callorhinchus milii	Australian Ghostshark	482.9	XP_007895354.1	326	58%	76%
Strongylocentrotus purpuratus	Sea Urchin	747.8	XP_781628.1	409	57%	73%
Crassostrea gigas	Pacific Oyster	847	EKC20817.1	420	56%	70%
Clonorchis sinensis	Chinese Liver Fluke	847	GAA48218.1	359	42%	55%
Nematostella vectensis	Startlet Sea Anemone	936	XP_001628705.1	244	42%	57%

=== Homologous domains ===
There are three conserved domains within FAM221B: DUF4475 super family, PRCC super family, and Caprin-1_C. DUF4475 is the most conserved domain of the three.

== Clinical significance ==
FAM221B is linked to mutations in the RNA component of RNase MRP, which causes pleiotropic human disease cartilage–hair hypoplasia. Also, as patients with acute lymphoblastic leukemia often carry genetic alterations in the short arm of human chromosome 9, FAM221B has two consistent non-synonymous amino acid variations associated with the disease. In acute lymphoblastic leukemia patients, Histidine is substituted for an Arginine at position 345, and a Leucine is substituted for a Phenylalanine at position 277 of the protein.
