= CAPB =

CAPB may refer to:

- Cocamidopropyl betaine
- EPH receptor B2, a receptor tyrosine kinases
