= Ephrin A5 =

Protein-coding gene in the species Homo sapiens

EFNA5
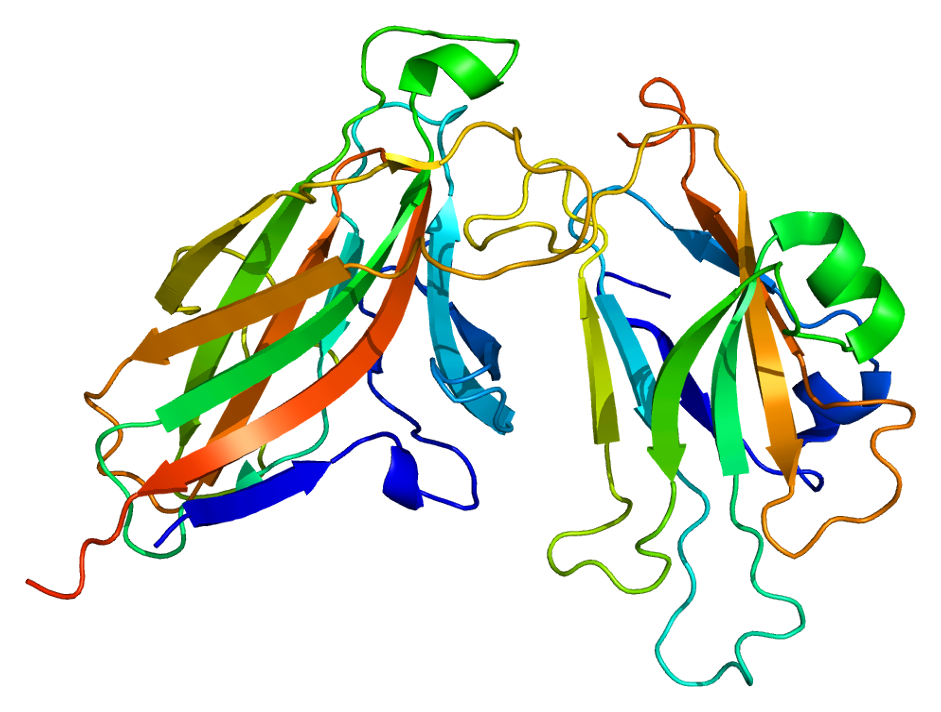

Identifiers
- Aliases: EFNA5, AF1, EFL5, EPLG7, GLC1M, LERK7, RAGS, ephrin A5
- External IDs: OMIM: 601535; MGI: 107444; GeneCards: EFNA5
Available structures
| PDB | Ortholog search: PDBe RCSB |
| PDB | List of PDB id codes 2X11, 3MX0, 4BK5, 4BKA, 4L0P, 4M4R |

Gene location (Human)
| Chr. | Chromosome 5 (human) |
| Band | 5q21.3 | Start | 107,376,894 bp |
| Band | 5q21.3 | End | 107,670,937 bp |

Gene location (Mouse)
| Chr. | Chromosome 17 (mouse) |
| Band | 17 E1.1|17 32.57 cM | Start | 62,911,179 bp |
| Band | 17 E1.1|17 32.57 cM | End | 63,188,312 bp |
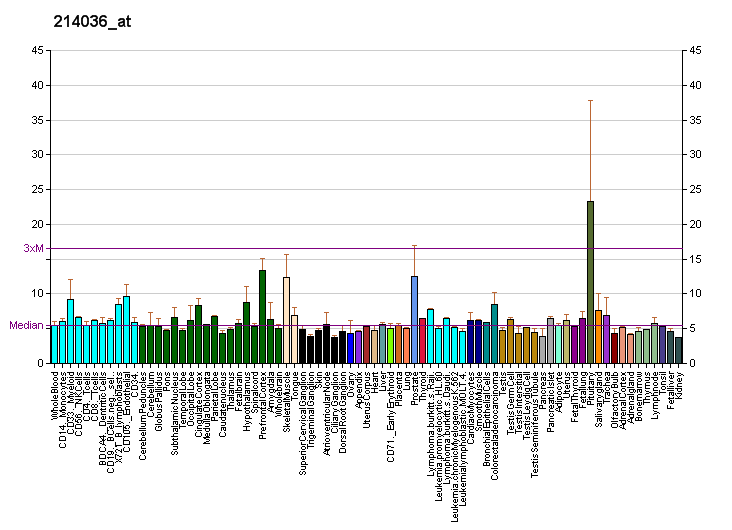

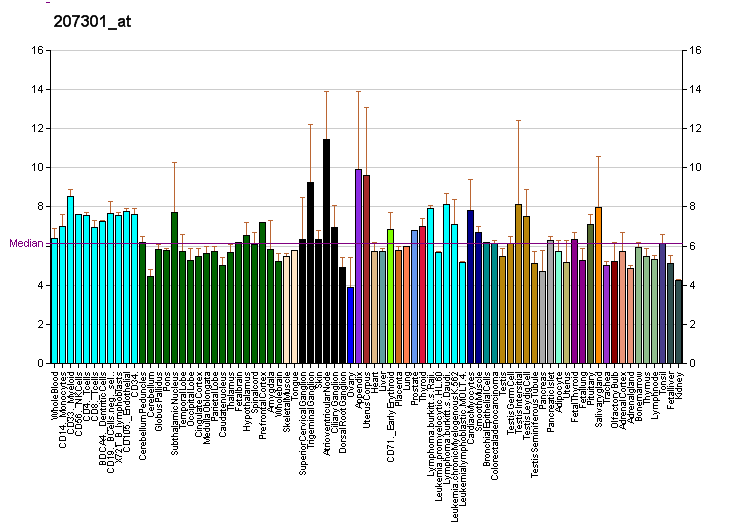
RNA expression pattern
| Bgee | Human / Mouse (ortholog); Top expressed in: hair follicle; Brodmann area 23; middle temporal gyrus; primary visual cortex; germinal epithelium; synovial joint; parietal pleura; nipple; endothelial cell; pancreatic ductal cell / Top expressed in: superior cervical ganglion; utricle; external carotid artery; ciliary body; internal carotid artery; iris; arcuate nucleus; hand; epithelium of lens; epithelium of stomach; More reference expression data |
| BioGPS | More reference expression data |
Gene ontology
| Molecular function | neurotrophin TRKC receptor binding; transmembrane receptor protein tyrosine kinase activator activity; neurotrophin TRKA receptor binding; ephrin receptor binding; chemorepellent activity; neurotrophin TRKB receptor binding; protein binding |
| Cellular component | membrane; plasma membrane; anchored component of external side of plasma membrane; caveola; anchored component of membrane; basement membrane; adherens junction; cell periphery; GABA-ergic synapse |
| Biological process | positive regulation of synapse assembly; apoptotic process; cell differentiation; regulation of insulin secretion involved in cellular response to glucose stimulus; positive regulation of protein phosphorylation; negative chemotaxis; regulation of actin cytoskeleton organization; regulation of GTPase activity; ephrin receptor signaling pathway; regulation of microtubule cytoskeleton organization; positive regulation of collateral sprouting; nervous system development; multicellular organism development; regulation of cell-cell adhesion; positive regulation of peptidyl-tyrosine phosphorylation; regulation of focal adhesion assembly; regulation of cell morphogenesis; collateral sprouting; negative regulation of substrate adhesion-dependent cell spreading; retinal ganglion cell axon guidance; cellular response to follicle-stimulating hormone stimulus; cellular response to forskolin; activation of transmembrane receptor protein tyrosine kinase activity; axon guidance; synaptic membrane adhesion |
Sources:Amigo / QuickGO
Orthologs
| Databases | NCBI: entry; OMA: entry |
| Species | Human | Mouse |
| Entrez | 1946 | 13640 |
| Ensembl | ENSG00000184349 | ENSMUSG00000048915 |
| UniProt | P52803 | O08543 |
| RefSeq (mRNA) | NM_001962 | NM_010109; NM_207654 |
| RefSeq (protein) | NP_001953 | NP_034239; NP_997537 |
| Location (UCSC) | Chr 5: 107.38 – 107.67 Mb | Chr 17: 62.91 – 63.19 Mb |
| PubMed search |
- Wikidata
| View/Edit Human | View/Edit Mouse |

Ephrin A5 is a protein that in humans is encoded by the EFNA5 gene.

Ephrin A5 is a glycosylphosphatidylinositol (GPI)-anchored protein of the ephrin-A subclass of ephrin ligands that binds to the EphA subclass of Eph receptors. Ephrin A5 has also been shown to bind to the EphB2 receptor.

== Reverse signaling in growth cone survival ==
"Reverse" signaling is one unique property of ephrin ligands that allows for the transmission of an intracellular signal in ephrin-expressing cells that is distinct from the signal transmitted in Eph receptor-expressing cells. Although the mechanism of "reverse" signaling by ephrin-As is not well understood, it is relatively surprising considering that ephrin-A ligands are attached to the cell membrane solely by a GPI linkage and unlike ephrin-Bs, lack a potential intracellular signaling domain. Nonetheless, certain ephrin-A ligands are known to initiate reverse signaling cascades like ephrin A5, which has been shown to stimulate the spreading of growth cones in cultures of mouse spinal motor neurons. Reverse signaling by ephrin A5 was demonstrated to be GPI-dependent as the elimination of all GPI linkages by the application of a phosphatidlyinositol-specific phospholipase C abolished the positive effects of ephrin A5 on growth cone spreading. Additionally, EphA receptors were shown to exert opposite effects on motor neuron growth cones by reducing growth cone size.

=== Formation of the retinotopic map ===
This finding that ephrin A5 promotes growth cone survival that is opposite of EphA signaling and mediated directly by ephrin A5 reverse signaling has important implications for axon guidance as it provides a mechanism by which migrating axons expressing EphAs would preferentially avoid ephrin A5 expressing cells and possibly migrate towards cells with lower expression of ephrin A5. This mechanism is in fact the same one that mediates the guidance of retinal ganglion cells to distinct regions in the superior colliculus during the formation of the retinotopic map. High ephrin A5 expression on cells in the posterior region of the SC bind to EphAs expressed in RGCs migrating from the temporal retina, inducing growth cone collapse and repelling these RGCs away from the posterior SC towards a region of low ephrin A5 expression in the anterior SC.
