= EPH receptor A1 =

Protein-coding gene in the species Homo sapiens

EPHA1
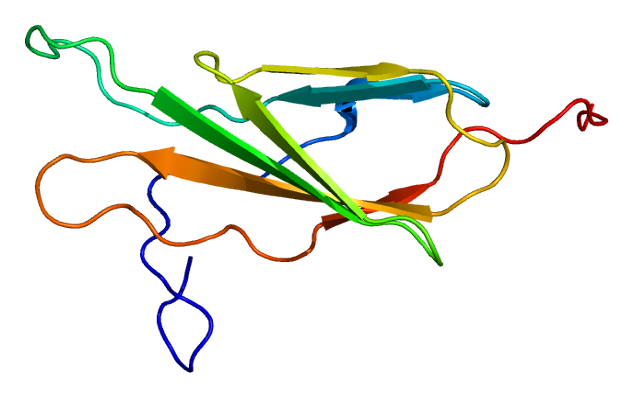

Identifiers
- Aliases: EPHA1, Epha1, 5730453L17Rik, AL033318, Eph, Esk, EPHT, EPHT1, EPH receptor A1, EPH
- External IDs: OMIM: 179610; MGI: 107381; GeneCards: EPHA1
Available structures
PDB	Ortholog search: PDBe RCSB
PDB	List of PDB id codes 2K1K, 2K1L, 3HIL, 3KKA
Enzyme activity
EC #	BRENDA	ExPASy	KEGG	MetaCyc
2.7.10.1	↗	↗	↗	↗

Gene location (Human)
Chr.	Chromosome 7 (human)
Band	7q34-q35	Start	143,390,289 bp
Band	7q34-q35	End	143,408,856 bp

Gene location (Mouse)
Chr.	Chromosome 6 (mouse)
Band	6|6 B2.1	Start	42,335,421 bp
Band	6|6 B2.1	End	42,350,202 bp
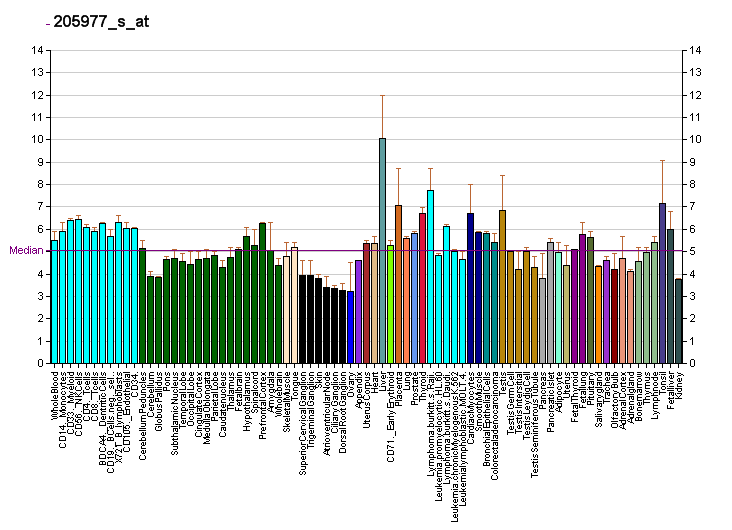
RNA expression pattern
Bgee	Human / Mouse (ortholog); Top expressed in: skin of leg; skin of abdomen; right uterine tube; right lobe of liver; minor salivary glands; vagina; left lobe of thyroid gland; ectocervix; mucosa of transverse colon; right lung / Top expressed in: lip; tail of embryo; esophagus; embryo; epiblast; female urethra; right kidney; ascending aorta; male urethra; genital tubercle; More reference expression data
BioGPS	More reference expression data
Gene ontology
Molecular function	transferase activity; protein kinase activity; nucleotide binding; transmembrane-ephrin receptor activity; kinase activity; transmembrane receptor protein tyrosine kinase activity; protein tyrosine kinase activity; ATP binding; protein kinase binding; ephrin receptor activity; receptor tyrosine kinase; transmembrane signaling receptor activity
Cellular component	integral component of membrane; membrane; plasma membrane; integral component of plasma membrane; cytoplasm; neuron projection; receptor complex
Biological process	somatic stem cell population maintenance; negative regulation of protein kinase activity; activation of GTPase activity; phosphorylation; transmembrane receptor protein tyrosine kinase signaling pathway; positive regulation of cell-matrix adhesion; positive regulation of cell migration; regulation of GTPase activity; positive regulation of angiogenesis; protein phosphorylation; cell surface receptor signaling pathway; negative regulation of cell migration; cell adhesion; angiogenesis; positive regulation of cell population proliferation; protein autophosphorylation; peptidyl-tyrosine phosphorylation; substrate adhesion-dependent cell spreading; positive regulation of stress fiber assembly; ephrin receptor signaling pathway; negative regulation of signal transduction; cell differentiation; negative regulation of apoptotic process; positive regulation of ERK1 and ERK2 cascade; axon guidance
Sources:Amigo / QuickGO
Orthologs
Databases	NCBI: entry; OMA: entry
Species	Human	Mouse
Entrez	2041	13835
Ensembl	ENSG00000146904; ENSG00000284816	ENSMUSG00000029859
UniProt	P21709	Q60750
RefSeq (mRNA)	NM_005232	NM_023580
RefSeq (protein)	NP_005223	NP_076069
Location (UCSC)	Chr 7: 143.39 – 143.41 Mb	Chr 6: 42.34 – 42.35 Mb
PubMed search
- Wikidata
View/Edit Human	View/Edit Mouse

EPH receptor A1 (ephrin type-A receptor 1) is a protein that in humans is encoded by the EPHA1 gene.

This gene belongs to the ephrin receptor subfamily of the protein-tyrosine kinase family. EPH and EPH-related receptors have been implicated in mediating developmental events, particularly in the nervous system. Receptors in the EPH subfamily typically have a single kinase domain and an extracellular region containing a Cys-rich domain and 2 fibronectin type III repeats. The ephrin receptors are divided into 2 groups based on the similarity of their extracellular domain sequences and their affinities for binding ephrin-A and ephrin-B ligands. This gene is expressed in some human cancer cell lines and has been implicated in carcinogenesis.
