= FAM221A =

Protein-coding gene in the species Homo sapiens

Identifiers
- Aliases: FAM221A, C7orf46, family with sequence similarity 221 member A
- External IDs: MGI: 2442161; GeneCards: FAM221A

Gene location (Human)
Chr.	Chromosome 7 (human)
Band	7p15.3	Start	23,680,130 bp
Band	7p15.3	End	23,703,249 bp

Gene location (Mouse)
Chr.	Chromosome 6 (mouse)
Band	6|6 B2.3	Start	49,344,673 bp
Band	6|6 B2.3	End	49,367,473 bp
RNA expression pattern
Bgee	Human / Mouse (ortholog); Top expressed in: buccal mucosa cell; bronchial epithelial cell; retinal pigment epithelium; germinal epithelium; gonad; right uterine tube; C1 segment; body of pancreas; pancreatic epithelial cell; mucosa of paranasal sinus / Top expressed in: spermatocyte; parotid gland; zygote; secondary oocyte; olfactory epithelium; primary oocyte; lacrimal gland; seminal vesicula; seminiferous tubule; granulocyte; More reference expression data
BioGPS	n/a
Orthologs
Databases	NCBI: entry; OMA: entry
Species	Human	Mouse
Entrez	340277	231946
Ensembl	ENSG00000188732	ENSMUSG00000047115
UniProt	A4D161	Q8C790
RefSeq (mRNA)	NM_001127364; NM_001127365; NM_001300932; NM_199136	NM_001172216; NM_172727
RefSeq (protein)	NP_001120836; NP_001120837; NP_001287861; NP_954587	NP_001165687; NP_766315
Location (UCSC)	Chr 7: 23.68 – 23.7 Mb	Chr 6: 49.34 – 49.37 Mb
PubMed search
- Wikidata
View/Edit Human	View/Edit Mouse

Family with sequence similarity 221 member A is a protein in humans that is encoded by the FAM221A gene. FAM221A is a gene that is not yet well understood by the scientific community. However, it appears that this gene may have a role in Parkinson's disease and prostate cancer.

== Gene ==
=== Location and aliases ===
FAM221A is located on Chromosome 7. Its exact location is 7p15.3. It has one alias, which is C7orf46.

=== Expression ===
FAM221A has higher levels of expression in the liver, brain, fetal brain, thyroid and colon, but FAM221A has the highest level of expression in the spinal cord, pancreas and retina.

The promoter region of FAM221A is 1222 base pairs long. This was found using ElDorado at Genomatix.

== Protein ==
=== Protein analysis ===
The molecular weight of FAM221A is 33.1 kDa, and the isoelectric point is 6.01. Relative to other proteins in humans, FAM221A has a lower level of asparagine.

=== Post-Translational Modifications ===
Post-translational modifications of FAM221A include phosphorylation sites, glycosylation sites and sulfation sites. These have been conserved in mammals other than Homo sapiens, including the macaque, whale, finch and sometimes alligator. These sites were predicted using NetPhos 3.1, YinOYang 1.2 and The Sulfinator.

=== Secondary Structure ===
Key structures predicted in FAM221A are random coils and alpha helices, with 71% of the protein being random coils and 21% being helices. Extended strands were also found with 7% of the protein being these. Secondary structure was predicted using RaptorX, and a diagram of the predicted secondary structure is included below.

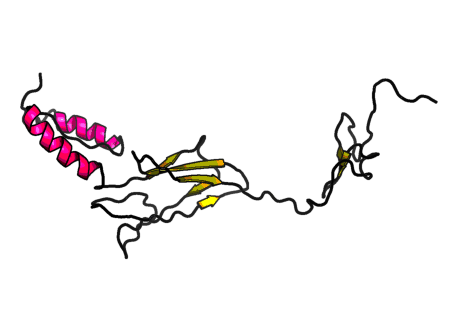
Secondary structure prediction of FAM221A using RaptorX.

== Homology/evolution ==
=== Paralogs ===
There exists one paralog for FAM221A: FAM221B. This diverged from FAM221A approximately 1781 million years ago.

=== Orthologs ===
Orthologs have been found in mammals, birds, reptiles and fish. FAM221A has also been conserved in invertebrates, but the similarity levels decrease at a faster rate. Orthologs were discovered using BLAST and BLAT. While these are not the only orthologs that exist for FAM221A, a table of 20 orthologs is provided below. The ortholog with no accession number was created using BLAT.

20 Orthologs of FAM221A
Species	Common name	Divergence (mya)	Accession number	Length (aa)	% Identity	% Similarity
Homo sapiens	Human	0	NP_954587.2	298	100	100
Macaca nemestrina	Southern pig-tailed macaque	28.1	XP_011729478.1	298	96	96
Condylura cristata	Star-nosed mole	94	XP_004677186.2	284	90	94
Cervus elaphus hippelaphus	Central European red deer	94	OWK06795.1	289	90	93
Delphinapterus leucas	Beluga whale	94	XP_022440764.1	298	90	92
Alligator mississippiensis	American alligator	320	KYO26809.1	366	78	86
Phalacrocorax carbo	Great cormorant	320	KFW96932.1	258	77	87
Lonchura striata domestica	Society finch	320	XP_021393915.1	298	76	85
Pelodiscus sinensis	Chinese softshell turtle	320	XP_014436679.1	236	76	85
Gallus Gallus	Red junglefowl	320	XP_418719.1	296	75	84
Crocodylus porosus	Saltwater crocodile	320	XP_019390202.1	236	75	84
Amphiprion ocellaris	Ocellaris clownfish	432	XP_023141881.1	248	63	75
Salvelinus alpinus	Arctic char	432	XP_023832019.1	372	59	71
Esox lucius	Northern pike	432	XP_010891304.1	332	55	69
Ciona intestinalis	Vase tunicate	678	N/A	212	77	87
Stylophora pistillata	Stylophora pistillata	685	XP_022787363.1	344	58	73
Schistosoma haematobium	Uniary blood fluke	692	XP_012794504.1	241	45	61
Crassostrea virginica	Eastern oyster	794	XP_022337450.1	324	59	72
Mizuhopecten yessoensis	Patinopecten yessoensis	794	XP_021377417.1	326	55	70
Phytophthora nicotianae	Black shank	1781	KUF80258.1	297	34	48
Chrysochromulina sp. CCMP291	Chrysochromulina tobin	1781	KOO33212.1	280	28	42

=== Divergence of FAM221A ===
To understand the times when FAM221A diverged from different species, a graph was created. This compares the evolutionary history of FAM221A to Fibrinogen, which evolves quickly, and Cytochrome C, which evolves slowly. As seen in the graph, FAM221A diverges from other species at a moderate pace.

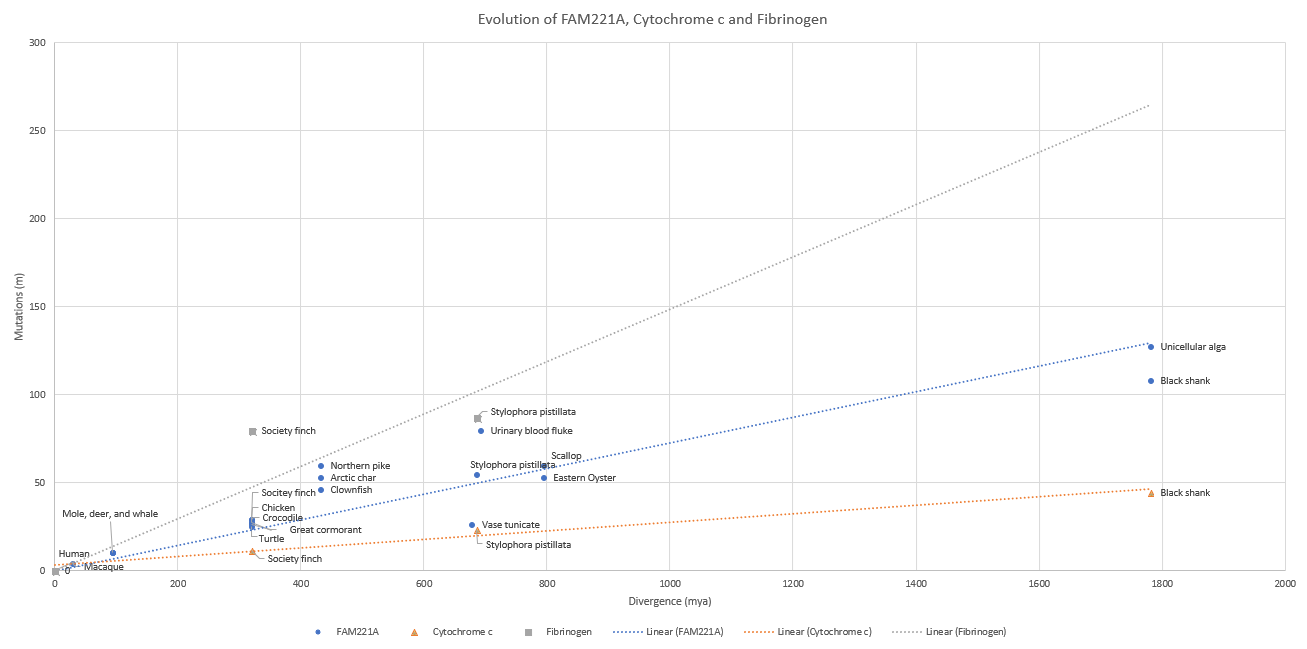
Evolutionary timeline for FAM221A in orthologs found.

== Clinical significance ==
FAM221A has a relatively high amount of expression in the brain and has been seen to have an association with neurodegenerative disorders such as Parkinson's disease and Alzheimer's disease. FAM221A has also been seen to have a higher level of expression in those who have prostate cancer versus healthy individuals. Furthermore, FAM221A has also been expressed in those with colorectal tumors.

== Interacting Proteins ==
Three interacting proteins were found, which are SNX2, SNX5 and SNX6.

SNX2 and SNX6 share the same function, which is being involved in the stages of intracellular trafficking. SNX5 facilitates cargo retrieval from endosomes to the trans-Golgi network.
