= Ephrin A2 =

Protein-coding gene in the species Homo sapiens

EFNA2

Identifiers
- Aliases: EFNA2, ELF-1, EPLG6, HEK7-L, LERK-6, LERK6, ephrin A2
- External IDs: OMIM: 602756; MGI: 102707; GeneCards: EFNA2
Available structures
PDB	Ortholog search: PDBe RCSB
PDB	List of PDB id codes 2WO3

Gene location (Human)
Chr.	Chromosome 19 (human)
Band	19p13.3	Start	1,285,873 bp
Band	19p13.3	End	1,301,431 bp

Gene location (Mouse)
Chr.	Chromosome 10 (mouse)
Band	10 C1|10 39.72 cM	Start	80,015,316 bp
Band	10 C1|10 39.72 cM	End	80,025,844 bp
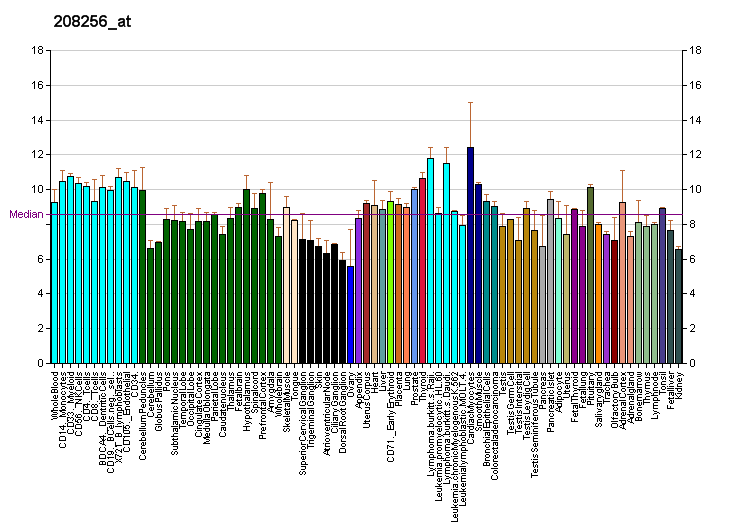
RNA expression pattern
Bgee	Human / Mouse (ortholog); Top expressed in: mucosa of ileum; mucosa of sigmoid colon; buccal mucosa cell; mucosa of transverse colon; pancreatic ductal cell; jejunal mucosa; gonad; duodenum; right lobe of liver; sural nerve / Top expressed in: internal carotid artery; external carotid artery; Rostral migratory stream; abdominal wall; gastrula; limb bud; Gonadal ridge; fossa; condyle; ganglionic eminence; More reference expression data
BioGPS	More reference expression data
Gene ontology
Molecular function	ephrin receptor binding; protein binding
Cellular component	anchored component of membrane; neuromuscular junction; perikaryon; membrane; plasma membrane
Biological process	cell-cell signaling; olfactory bulb development; axon guidance; osteoclast differentiation; bone remodeling; ephrin receptor signaling pathway
Sources:Amigo / QuickGO
Orthologs
Databases	NCBI: entry; OMA: entry
Species	Human	Mouse
Entrez	1943	13637
Ensembl	ENSG00000099617	ENSMUSG00000003070
UniProt	O43921	P52801
RefSeq (mRNA)	NM_001405	NM_007909
RefSeq (protein)	NP_001396	NP_031935
Location (UCSC)	Chr 19: 1.29 – 1.3 Mb	Chr 10: 80.02 – 80.03 Mb
PubMed search
- Wikidata
View/Edit Human	View/Edit Mouse

Ephrin-A2 is a protein that in humans is encoded by the EFNA2 gene.

This gene encodes a member of the ephrin family. The protein is composed of a signal sequence, a receptor-binding region, a spacer region, and a hydrophobic region. The EPH and EPH-related receptors comprise the largest subfamily of receptor protein-tyrosine kinases and have been implicated in mediating developmental events, particularly in the nervous system. Based on their structures and sequence relationships, ephrins are divided into the ephrin-A (EFNA) class, which are anchored to the membrane by a glycosylphosphatidylinositol linkage, and the ephrin-B (EFNB) class, which are transmembrane proteins. Posttranslational modifications determine whether this protein localizes to the nucleus or the cytoplasm.
