= EPH receptor A5 =

Protein-coding gene in the species Homo sapiens

EPHA5

Identifiers
- Aliases: EPHA5, CEK7, EHK-1, EHK1, EK7, HEK7, TYRO4, EPH receptor A5
- External IDs: OMIM: 600004; MGI: 99654; GeneCards: EPHA5
Available structures
| PDB | Ortholog search: PDBe RCSB |
| PDB | List of PDB id codes 2R2P, 4ET7 |
Enzyme activity
| EC # | BRENDA | ExPASy | KEGG | MetaCyc |
|---|---|---|---|---|
| 2.7.10.1 | ↗ | ↗ | ↗ | ↗ |

Gene location (Human)
| Chr. | Chromosome 4 (human) |
| Band | 4q13.1-q13.2 | Start | 65,319,563 bp |
| Band | 4q13.1-q13.2 | End | 65,670,495 bp |

Gene location (Mouse)
| Chr. | Chromosome 5 (mouse) |
| Band | 5 E1|5 43.0 cM | Start | 84,202,620 bp |
| Band | 5 E1|5 43.0 cM | End | 84,565,241 bp |
RNA expression pattern
| Bgee | Human / Mouse (ortholog); Top expressed in: ganglionic eminence; ventricular zone; sperm; prefrontal cortex; middle temporal gyrus; testicle; entorhinal cortex; dorsolateral prefrontal cortex; primary visual cortex; frontal pole / Top expressed in: ganglionic eminence; ventral tegmental area; ventricular zone; Region I of hippocampus proper; substantia nigra; barrel cortex; olfactory bulb; piriform cortex; amygdala; hippocampus proper; More reference expression data |
| BioGPS | n/a |
Gene ontology
| Molecular function | transferase activity; nucleotide binding; protein kinase activity; GPI-linked ephrin receptor activity; transmembrane-ephrin receptor activity; kinase activity; transmembrane receptor protein tyrosine kinase activity; protein tyrosine kinase activity; ATP binding; ephrin receptor activity; receptor tyrosine kinase; transmembrane signaling receptor activity |
| Cellular component | integral component of membrane; rough endoplasmic reticulum; cell projection; membrane; plasma membrane; integral component of plasma membrane; axon; soma; dendrite; perinuclear region of cytoplasm; external side of plasma membrane; cytoplasm; neuron projection; receptor complex |
| Biological process | regulation of insulin secretion involved in cellular response to glucose stimulus; regulation of actin cytoskeleton organization; phosphorylation; transmembrane receptor protein tyrosine kinase signaling pathway; regulation of GTPase activity; neuron development; nervous system development; protein phosphorylation; positive regulation of CREB transcription factor activity; peptidyl-tyrosine phosphorylation; hippocampus development; cAMP-mediated signaling; axon guidance; ephrin receptor signaling pathway; negative regulation of signal transduction; cell differentiation; negative regulation of apoptotic process; positive regulation of ERK1 and ERK2 cascade |
Sources:Amigo / QuickGO
Orthologs
| Databases | NCBI: entry; OMA: entry |
| Species | Human | Mouse |
| Entrez | 2044 | 13839 |
| Ensembl | ENSG00000145242 | ENSMUSG00000029245 |
| UniProt | P54756 | Q60629 |
| RefSeq (mRNA) | NM_001281765; NM_001281766; NM_001281767; NM_004439; NM_182472 NM_001318761 | NM_007937 |
| RefSeq (protein) | NP_001268694; NP_001268695; NP_001268696; NP_001305690; NP_004430 NP_872272 | NP_031963; NP_001389678; NP_001389679; NP_001389680; NP_001389681 NP_001389682; NP_001389683; NP_001389684; NP_001389685; NP_001389686; NP_001389687; NP_001389688; NP_001389689; NP_001389690 |
| Location (UCSC) | Chr 4: 65.32 – 65.67 Mb | Chr 5: 84.2 – 84.57 Mb |
| PubMed search |
- Wikidata
| View/Edit Human | View/Edit Mouse |

EPH receptor A5 (ephrin type-A receptor 5) is a protein that in humans is encoded by the EPHA5 gene.

This gene belongs to the ephrin receptor subfamily of the protein-tyrosine kinase family. EPH and EPH-related receptors have been implicated in mediating developmental events, particularly in the nervous system. Receptors in the EPH subfamily typically have a single kinase domain and an extracellular region containing a Cys-rich domain and 2 fibronectin type III repeats. The ephrin receptors are divided into 2 groups based on the similarity of their extracellular domain sequences and their affinities for binding ephrin-A and ephrin-B ligands.
