= EPH receptor A4 =

Protein found in humans

EPHA4
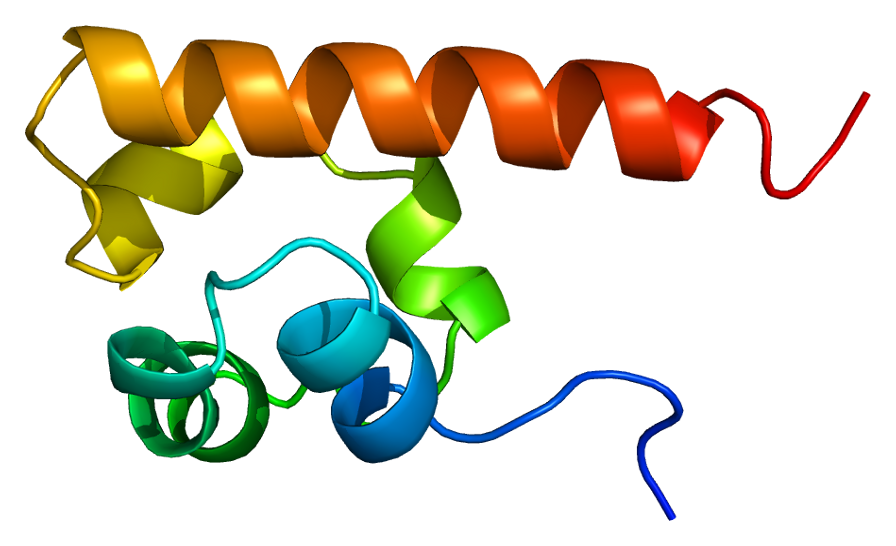

Identifiers
- Aliases: EPHA4, Epha4, 2900005C20Rik, AI385584, Cek8, Hek8, Sek, Sek1, Tyro1, rb, EPH receptor A4, HEK8, SEK, TYRO1, EK8
- External IDs: OMIM: 602188; MGI: 98277; GeneCards: EPHA4
Available structures
PDB	Ortholog search: PDBe RCSB
PDB	List of PDB id codes 2LW8, 2WO1, 2WO2, 2WO3, 3CKH, 3GXU, 4BK4, 4BK5, 4BKA, 4BKF, 4M4P, 4M4R, 4W4Z, 4W50, 5JR2
Enzyme activity
EC #	BRENDA	ExPASy	KEGG	MetaCyc
2.7.10.1	↗	↗	↗	↗

Gene location (Human)
Chr.	Chromosome 2 (human)
Band	2q36.1	Start	221,418,027 bp
Band	2q36.1	End	221,574,202 bp

Gene location (Mouse)
Chr.	Chromosome 1 (mouse)
Band	1 C4|1 39.55 cM	Start	77,343,822 bp
Band	1 C4|1 39.55 cM	End	77,491,725 bp
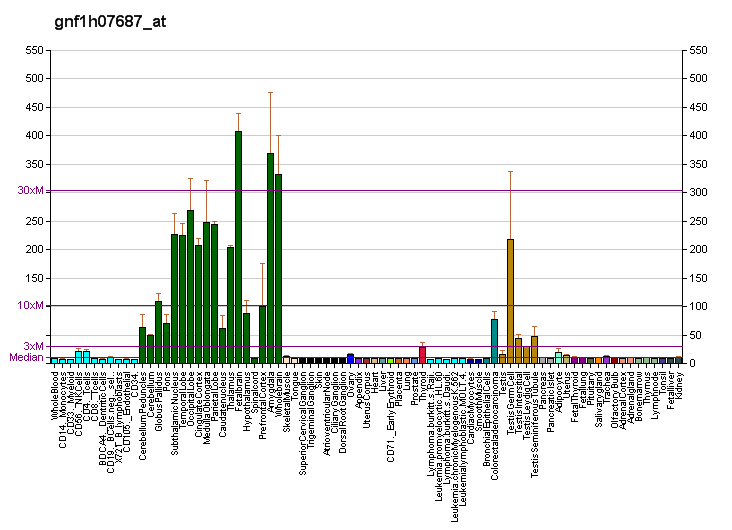

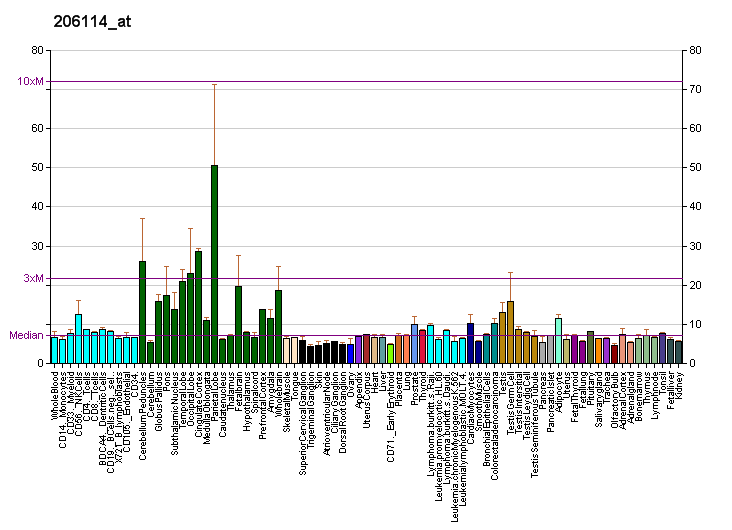
RNA expression pattern
Bgee	Human / Mouse (ortholog); Top expressed in: Brodmann area 23; frontal pole; middle temporal gyrus; lateral nuclear group of thalamus; endothelial cell; primary visual cortex; superior frontal gyrus; parietal lobe; postcentral gyrus; palpebral conjunctiva / Top expressed in: Rostral migratory stream; medial ganglionic eminence; ventricular zone; dorsal striatum; genital tubercle; dentate gyrus of hippocampal formation granule cell; medial dorsal nucleus; lateral geniculate nucleus; nucleus accumbens; tail of embryo; More reference expression data
BioGPS	More reference expression data
Gene ontology
Molecular function	transferase activity; protein kinase activity; nucleotide binding; GPI-linked ephrin receptor activity; ephrin receptor binding; DH domain binding; transmembrane-ephrin receptor activity; kinase activity; protein binding; identical protein binding; transmembrane receptor protein tyrosine kinase activity; PH domain binding; protein tyrosine kinase activity; ATP binding; ephrin receptor activity; amyloid-beta binding; protein tyrosine kinase binding
Cellular component	cytoplasm; axon terminus; integral component of membrane; cell body; perikaryon; postsynaptic membrane; Golgi apparatus; endosome; cell projection; early endosome membrane; membrane; postsynaptic density; filopodium; neuromuscular junction; plasma membrane; dendritic spine; axonal growth cone; integral component of plasma membrane; synapse; cell surface; mitochondrial outer membrane; cell junction; axon; dendrite; early endosome; endoplasmic reticulum; neuron projection; dendritic shaft; receptor complex; Schaffer collateral - CA1 synapse; glutamatergic synapse; integral component of postsynaptic membrane; integral component of presynaptic membrane
Biological process	negative regulation of axon regeneration; fasciculation of motor neuron axon; phosphorylation; transmembrane receptor protein tyrosine kinase signaling pathway; positive regulation of JUN kinase activity; regulation of GTPase activity; nervous system development; regulation of axonogenesis; multicellular organism development; protein phosphorylation; regulation of astrocyte differentiation; cell adhesion; positive regulation of dendrite morphogenesis; nephric duct morphogenesis; protein autophosphorylation; corticospinal tract morphogenesis; peptidyl-tyrosine phosphorylation; fasciculation of sensory neuron axon; motor neuron axon guidance; positive regulation of Rho guanyl-nucleotide exchange factor activity; regulation of dendritic spine morphogenesis; glial cell migration; adult walking behavior; axon guidance; ephrin receptor signaling pathway; negative regulation of neuron projection development; protein stabilization; positive regulation of protein tyrosine kinase activity; neuron projection guidance; synapse pruning; neuron projection fasciculation; negative regulation of long-term synaptic potentiation; positive regulation of amyloid-beta formation; positive regulation of aspartic-type endopeptidase activity involved in amyloid precursor protein catabolic process; negative regulation of proteolysis involved in cellular protein catabolic process; cellular response to amyloid-beta; regulation of modification of synaptic structure
Sources:Amigo / QuickGO
Orthologs
Databases	NCBI: entry; OMA: entry
Species	Human	Mouse
Entrez	2043	13838
Ensembl	ENSG00000116106	ENSMUSG00000026235
UniProt	P54764	Q03137
RefSeq (mRNA)	NM_001304536; NM_001304537; NM_004438; NM_001363748	NM_007936
RefSeq (protein)	NP_001291465; NP_001291466; NP_004429; NP_001350677	NP_031962
Location (UCSC)	Chr 2: 221.42 – 221.57 Mb	Chr 1: 77.34 – 77.49 Mb
PubMed search
- Wikidata
View/Edit Human	View/Edit Mouse

EPH receptor A4 (ephrin type-A receptor 4) is a protein that in humans is encoded by the EPHA4 gene.

== Structure ==
This gene belongs to the ephrin receptor subfamily of the protein-tyrosine kinase family. Receptors in the EPH subfamily typically have a single kinase domain and an extracellular region containing a Cys-rich domain and 2 fibronectin type III repeats. The ephrin receptors are divided into 2 groups based on the similarity of their extracellular domain sequences and their affinities for binding ephrin-A and ephrin-B ligands.

== Function ==
EPH and EPH-related receptors have been implicated in mediating developmental events, particularly in the nervous system.

EphA4 is a ubiquitously expressed receptor tyrosine kinase of the Eph family that mediates bidirectional cell signaling through interactions with both ephrin-A and ephrin-B ligands, orchestrating axonal guidance, synaptic plasticity, and glial responses in the central nervous system. EphA4 is a versatile modulator of neuronal development and pathology, integrating cytoskeletal remodeling, axon guidance, and glial scar formation via RhoA/ROCK-dependent signaling, while its overactivation impedes axonal regeneration after spinal cord or brain injury. EphA4 sustains inhibitory cues that limit neuronal repair, and its inhibition has been shown to enhance motor function recovery and myelination. EphA4 disrupts synaptic integrity and potentiating amyloid-driven neurotoxicity; conversely, genetic or pharmacological attenuation of EphA4 signaling restores synaptic function and ameliorates cognitive decline. EphA4 directly triggers motor neuron death in models of motor neuron disease through caspase activation and excitotoxic pathways.

== Clinical significance ==
EphA4 is a multifunctional receptor tyrosine kinase whose altered signaling is implicated in numerous neurological diseases. It regulates axonal guidance, synaptic plasticity, and myelination during central nervous system development, but its over activation contributes to neurodegenerative processes including amyotrophic lateral sclerosis (ALS), Alzheimer's disease (AD), Parkinson's disease, traumatic brain injury, and spinal cord injury. Dysregulated signaling promotes astrocytic gliosis, glial scar formation, and impaired axonal regeneration, thereby limiting neuronal recovery. In AD, enhanced EphA4 activity drives synaptic loss and cognitive decline through mechanisms such as β-amyloid–induced dendritic spine retraction, while receptor inhibition restores synaptic integrity. In ALS, EphA4 expression level acts as a modifier of disease severity, with reduced receptor activity correlating with slower progression and enhanced motor neuron survival. Overall, EphA4 serves as a critical mediator of neuroinflammation, synaptic dysfunction, and regenerative inhibition, positioning it as a promising therapeutic target across degenerative and traumatic brain disorders.
