= RAB35 =

Protein-coding gene in the species Homo sapiens

Identifiers
- Aliases: RAB35, H-ray, RAB1C, RAY, member RAS oncogene family
- External IDs: OMIM: 604199; MGI: 1924657; GeneCards: RAB35
Available structures
PDB	Ortholog search: PDBe RCSB
PDB	List of PDB id codes 3TW8
Enzyme activity
EC #	BRENDA	ExPASy	KEGG	MetaCyc
3.6.5.2	↗	↗	↗	↗

Gene location (Human)
Chr.	Chromosome 12 (human)
Band	12q24.23	Start	120,095,099 bp
Band	12q24.23	End	120,117,502 bp

Gene location (Mouse)
Chr.	Chromosome 5 (mouse)
Band	5|5 F	Start	115,769,967 bp
Band	5|5 F	End	115,785,795 bp
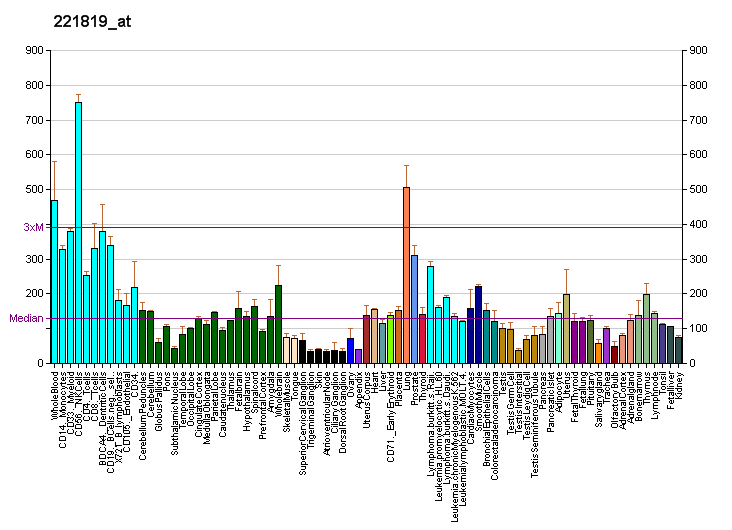

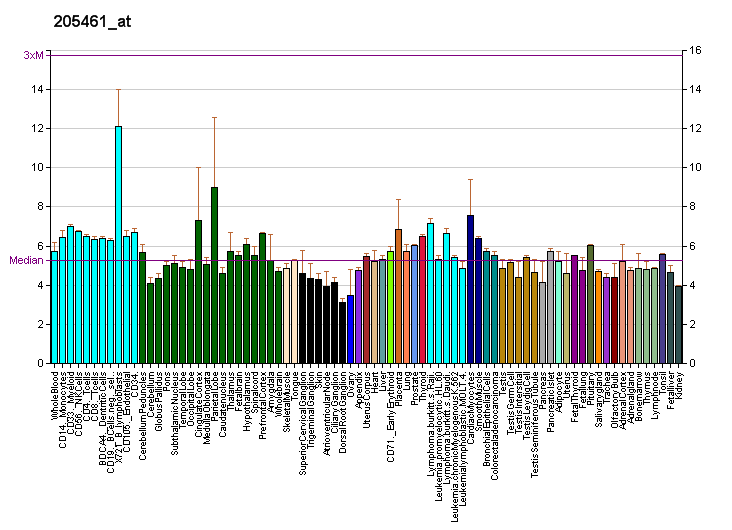
RNA expression pattern
Bgee	Human / Mouse (ortholog); Top expressed in: granulocyte; stromal cell of endometrium; skin of leg; skin of abdomen; monocyte; mucosa of esophagus; ganglionic eminence; left uterine tube; ectocervix; right coronary artery / Top expressed in: granulocyte; placenta; ganglionic eminence; dentate gyrus of hippocampal formation granule cell; hippocampus proper; primary visual cortex; striatum of neuraxis; lip; white adipose tissue; cerebellum; More reference expression data
BioGPS	More reference expression data
Gene ontology
Molecular function	nucleotide binding; GDP binding; GTP binding; protein binding; phosphatidylinositol-4,5-bisphosphate binding; GTPase activity
Cellular component	endosome; membrane; melanosome; clathrin-coated endocytic vesicle; plasma membrane; mitochondrion; cell projection membrane; intercellular bridge; clathrin-coated pit; endosome membrane; extracellular exosome; cytoplasmic vesicle; clathrin-coated vesicle; cytosol; clathrin-coated vesicle membrane; recycling endosome membrane; anchored component of synaptic vesicle membrane; Golgi membrane; intracellular anatomical structure
Biological process	protein localization; cellular response to nerve growth factor stimulus; antigen processing and presentation; cytokinesis; endosomal transport; plasma membrane to endosome transport; endocytic recycling; protein transport; protein localization to endosome; neuron projection development; transport; mitotic cytokinesis; intracellular protein transport; Rab protein signal transduction; small GTPase mediated signal transduction
Sources:Amigo / QuickGO
Orthologs
Databases	NCBI: entry; OMA: entry
Species	Human	Mouse
Entrez	11021	77407
Ensembl	ENSG00000111737	ENSMUSG00000029518
UniProt	Q15286	Q6PHN9
RefSeq (mRNA)	NM_001167606; NM_006861	NM_198163
RefSeq (protein)	NP_001161078; NP_006852	NP_937806
Location (UCSC)	Chr 12: 120.1 – 120.12 Mb	Chr 5: 115.77 – 115.79 Mb
PubMed search
- Wikidata
View/Edit Human	View/Edit Mouse

Ras-related protein Rab-35 is a protein that in humans is encoded by the RAB35 gene. This GTPase participates in the traffic of recycling endosomes toward the plasma membrane,
