= EPH receptor B4 =

Protein-coding gene in the species Homo sapiens

EPHB4
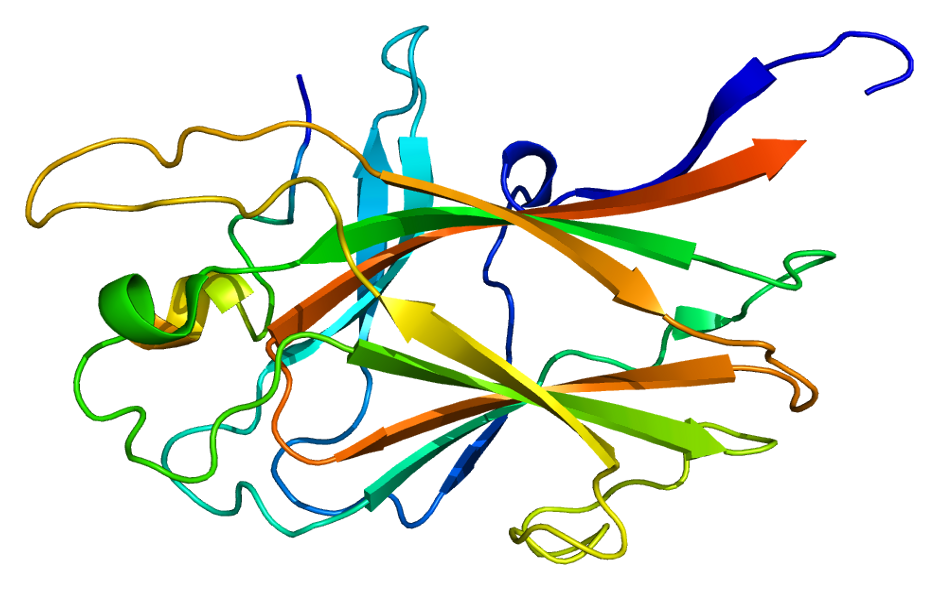

Identifiers
- Aliases: EPHB4, Ephb4, AI042935, Htk, MDK2, Myk1, Tyro11, EPH receptor B4, HTK, MYK1, TYRO11, HFASD, CMAVM2, LMPHM7
- External IDs: OMIM: 600011; MGI: 104757; GeneCards: EPHB4
Available structures
PDB	Ortholog search: PDBe RCSB
PDB	List of PDB id codes 2BBA, 2E7H, 2QKQ, 2VWU, 2VWV, 2VWW, 2VWX, 2VWY, 2VWZ, 2VX0, 2VX1, 2X9F, 2XVD, 2YN8, 3ZEW, 4AW5, 4BB4, 2HLE
Enzyme activity
EC #	BRENDA	ExPASy	KEGG	MetaCyc
2.7.10.1	↗	↗	↗	↗

Gene location (Human)
Chr.	Chromosome 7 (human)
Band	7q22.1	Start	100,802,565 bp
Band	7q22.1	End	100,827,523 bp

Gene location (Mouse)
Chr.	Chromosome 5 (mouse)
Band	5|5 G2	Start	137,348,371 bp
Band	5|5 G2	End	137,376,931 bp
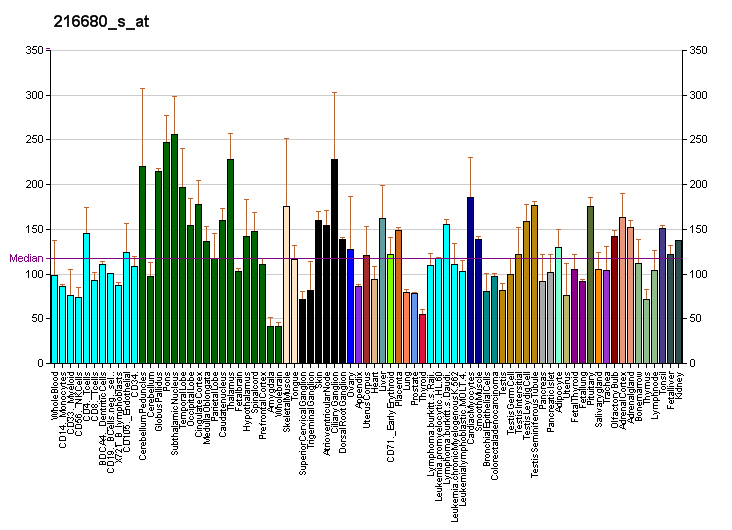

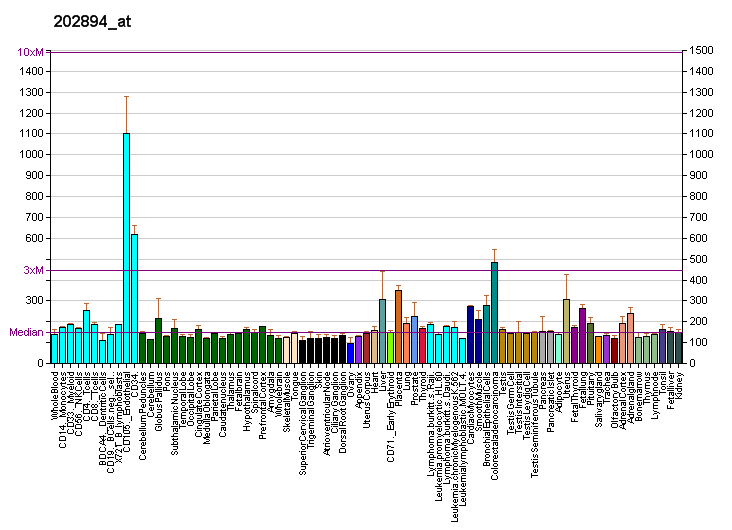
RNA expression pattern
Bgee	Human / Mouse (ortholog); Top expressed in: olfactory bulb; beta cell; body of uterus; right adrenal gland; right adrenal cortex; left adrenal gland; left adrenal cortex; right lung; ectocervix; canal of the cervix / Top expressed in: tail of embryo; genital tubercle; otic vesicle; saccule; atrium; yolk sac; left ventricle; aortic valve; lip; maxillary prominence; More reference expression data
BioGPS	More reference expression data
Gene ontology
Molecular function	transferase activity; nucleotide binding; protein kinase activity; kinase activity; protein binding; transmembrane receptor protein tyrosine kinase activity; protein tyrosine kinase activity; ATP binding; ephrin receptor activity; transmembrane-ephrin receptor activity
Cellular component	integral component of membrane; cytosol; membrane; plasma membrane; integral component of plasma membrane; extracellular region; extracellular exosome; neuron projection; receptor complex
Biological process	phosphorylation; transmembrane receptor protein tyrosine kinase signaling pathway; heart morphogenesis; cell migration involved in sprouting angiogenesis; multicellular organism development; protein phosphorylation; cell adhesion; angiogenesis; protein autophosphorylation; peptidyl-tyrosine phosphorylation; ephrin receptor signaling pathway; axon guidance
Sources:Amigo / QuickGO
Orthologs
Databases	NCBI: entry; OMA: entry
Species	Human	Mouse
Entrez	2050	13846
Ensembl	ENSG00000196411	ENSMUSG00000029710
UniProt	P54760	P54761
RefSeq (mRNA)	NM_004444	NM_001159571; NM_010144
RefSeq (protein)	NP_004435	NP_001153043; NP_034274
Location (UCSC)	Chr 7: 100.8 – 100.83 Mb	Chr 5: 137.35 – 137.38 Mb
PubMed search
- Wikidata
View/Edit Human	View/Edit Mouse

Ephrin type-B receptor 4 is a protein that in humans is encoded by the EPHB4 gene.

Ephrin receptors and their ligands, the ephrins, mediate numerous developmental processes, particularly in the nervous system. Based on their structures and sequence relationships, ephrins are divided into the ephrin-A (EFNA) class, which are anchored to the membrane by a glycosylphosphatidylinositol linkage, and the ephrin-B (EFNB) class, which are transmembrane proteins. The Eph family of receptors are divided into 2 groups based on the similarity of their extracellular domain sequences and their affinities for binding ephrin-A and ephrin-B ligands. Ephrin receptors make up the largest subgroup of the receptor tyrosine kinase (RTK) family. The protein encoded by this gene binds to ephrin-B2 and plays an essential role in vascular development.
