= Ephrin B3 =

Protein-coding gene in the species Homo sapiens

EFNB3

Identifiers
- Aliases: EFNB3, EFL6, EPLG8, LERK8, ephrin B3
- External IDs: OMIM: 602297; MGI: 109196; GeneCards: EFNB3
Available structures
PDB	Ortholog search: PDBe RCSB
PDB	List of PDB id codes 4BKF

Gene location (Human)
Chr.	Chromosome 17 (human)
Band	17p13.1	Start	7,705,202 bp
Band	17p13.1	End	7,711,372 bp

Gene location (Mouse)
Chr.	Chromosome 11 (mouse)
Band	11 B3|11 42.8 cM	Start	69,444,918 bp
Band	11 B3|11 42.8 cM	End	69,451,031 bp
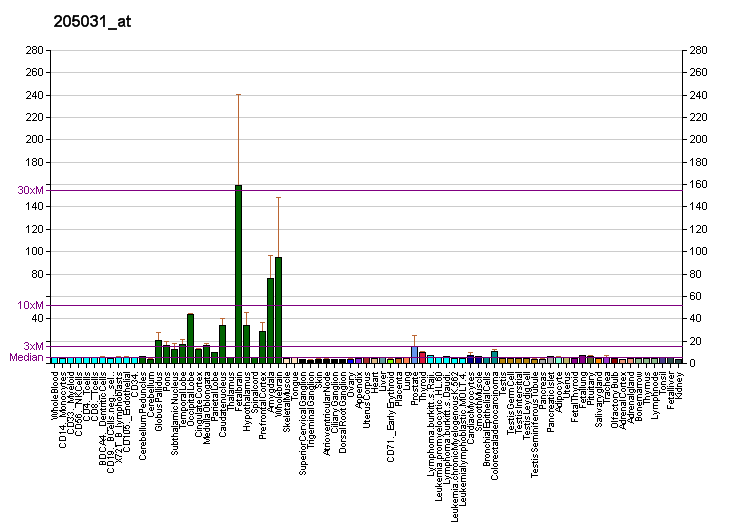

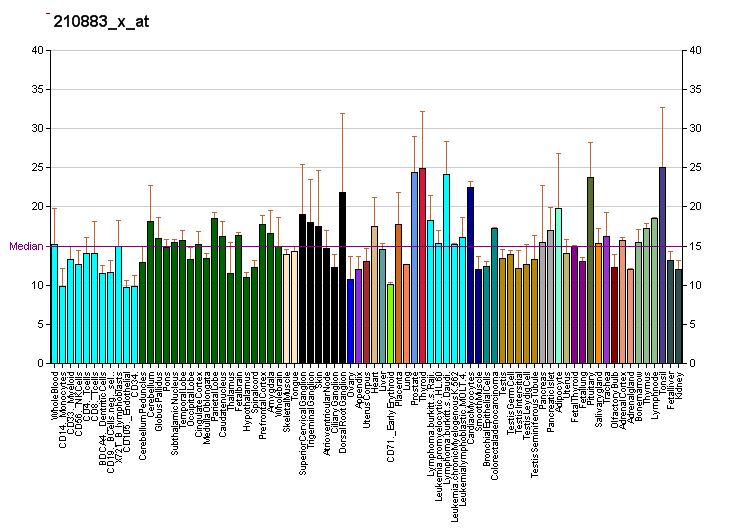
RNA expression pattern
Bgee	Human / Mouse (ortholog); Top expressed in: middle temporal gyrus; nucleus accumbens; endothelial cell; prefrontal cortex; Brodmann area 46; ganglionic eminence; dorsolateral prefrontal cortex; caudate nucleus; entorhinal cortex; ventricular zone / Top expressed in: entorhinal cortex; CA3 field; dentate gyrus of hippocampal formation granule cell; lumbar subsegment of spinal cord; perirhinal cortex; superior frontal gyrus; nucleus of stria terminalis; primary visual cortex; subiculum; suprachiasmatic nucleus; More reference expression data
BioGPS	More reference expression data
Gene ontology
Molecular function	ephrin receptor binding; transmembrane-ephrin receptor activity; virus receptor activity; protein tyrosine kinase activity
Cellular component	integral component of membrane; integral component of plasma membrane; membrane; plasma membrane; hippocampal mossy fiber to CA3 synapse; glutamatergic synapse; integral component of presynaptic membrane; integral component of postsynaptic density membrane
Biological process	ephrin receptor signaling pathway; multicellular organism development; cell-cell signaling; viral entry into host cell; T cell costimulation; cell differentiation; viral process; axon choice point recognition; nervous system development; adult walking behavior; axon guidance; peptidyl-tyrosine phosphorylation; negative regulation of axonogenesis; trans-synaptic signaling by trans-synaptic complex, modulating synaptic transmission
Sources:Amigo / QuickGO
Orthologs
Databases	NCBI: entry; OMA: entry
Species	Human	Mouse
Entrez	1949	13643
Ensembl	ENSG00000108947	ENSMUSG00000003934
UniProt	Q15768	O35393
RefSeq (mRNA)	NM_001406	NM_007911
RefSeq (protein)	NP_001397	NP_031937
Location (UCSC)	Chr 17: 7.71 – 7.71 Mb	Chr 11: 69.44 – 69.45 Mb
PubMed search
- Wikidata
View/Edit Human	View/Edit Mouse

Ephrin-B3 is a protein that in humans is encoded by the EFNB3 gene.

EFNB3, a member of the ephrin gene family, is important in brain development as well as in its maintenance. The EPH and EPH-related receptors comprise the largest subfamily of receptor protein-tyrosine kinases. EPH receptors typically have a single kinase domain and an extracellular region containing a Cysteine-rich domain and 2 fibronectin type III repeats. The ephrin ligands and receptors have been named by the Eph Nomenclature Committee (1997) based on their structures and sequence relationships. Ephrins are divided into the ephrin-A (EFNA) class, which are anchored to the membrane by a glycosylphosphatidylinositol linkage, and the ephrin-B (EFNB) class, which are transmembrane proteins. Ephrin-B ligands also contain an intracellular tail with highly conserved tyrosine residues and a PDZ-binding motif at the C-terminus. This tail functions as a mechanism for reverse signaling, where signaling occurs into the ligand-containing cell, as opposed to the cell with the receptor. Upon receptor-ligand interaction the tyrosine residues become phosphorylated and there is recruitment of PDZ domain-containing proteins. The Eph family of receptors are similarly divided into two groups based on the similarity of their extracellular domain sequences and their affinities for binding ephrin-A and ephrin-B ligands. EphrinB3 has been implicated in mediating various developmental events, particularly in the nervous system. EphrinB3 reverse signaling is important for axon pruning and synapse and spine formation during postnatal development of the nervous system. Previous work has also shown that signaling through this ligand is important for radial migration during cortical development. Moreover, levels of EFNB3 expression are particularly high in several forebrain subregions compared to other brain subregions, and may play a pivotal role in forebrain function. It has been suggested that ephrinB3 signaling is necessary for synaptic plasticity to occur in the hippocampus; this implicates ephrinB3 as a major player in learning and memory. More recently, ephrinB3 has been shown to regulate proliferation of neural stem cells in the adult subventricular zone (SVZ).
