= EPH receptor B2 =

Protein found in humans

EPHB2
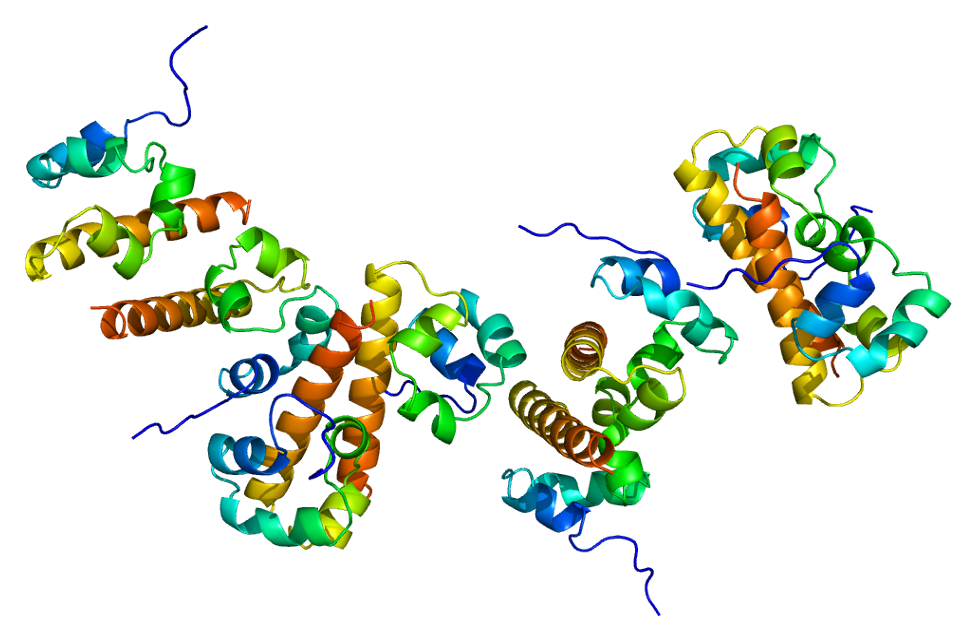

Identifiers
- Aliases: EPHB2, Ephb2, Cek5, Drt, ETECK, Erk, Hek5, Nuk, Prkm5, Qek5, Sek3, Tyro5, CAPB, EK5, EPHT3, PCBC, EPH receptor B2, DRT, ERK, BDPLT22
- External IDs: OMIM: 600997; MGI: 99611; GeneCards: EPHB2
Available structures
PDB	Ortholog search: PDBe RCSB
PDB	List of PDB id codes 1B4F, 1F0M, 2QBX, 3ZFM
Enzyme activity
EC #	BRENDA	ExPASy	KEGG	MetaCyc
2.7.10.1	↗	↗	↗	↗

Gene location (Human)
Chr.	Chromosome 1 (human)
Band	1p36.12	Start	22,710,839 bp
Band	1p36.12	End	22,921,500 bp

Gene location (Mouse)
Chr.	Chromosome 4 (mouse)
Band	4 D3|4 69.0 cM	Start	136,374,850 bp
Band	4 D3|4 69.0 cM	End	136,563,299 bp
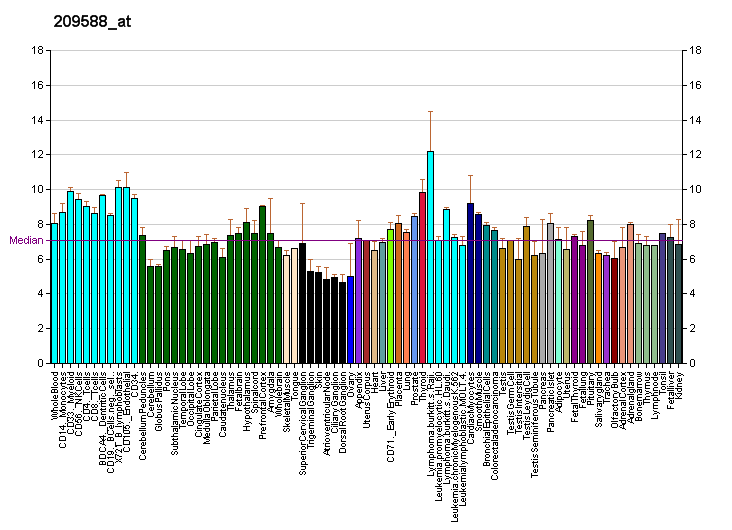

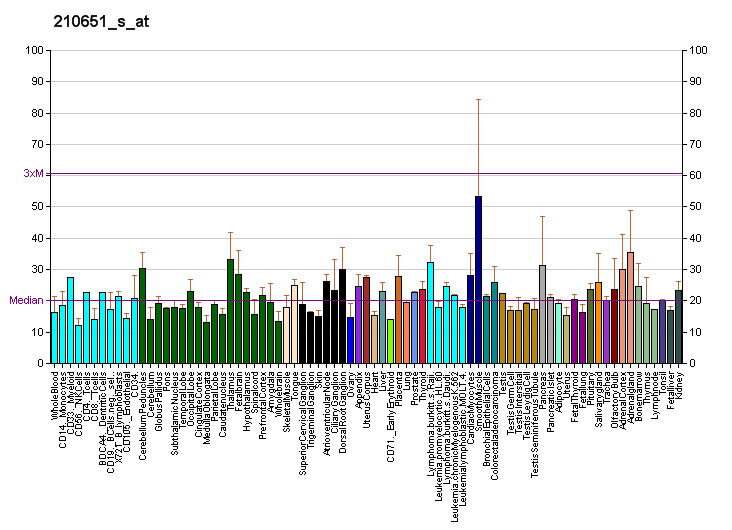

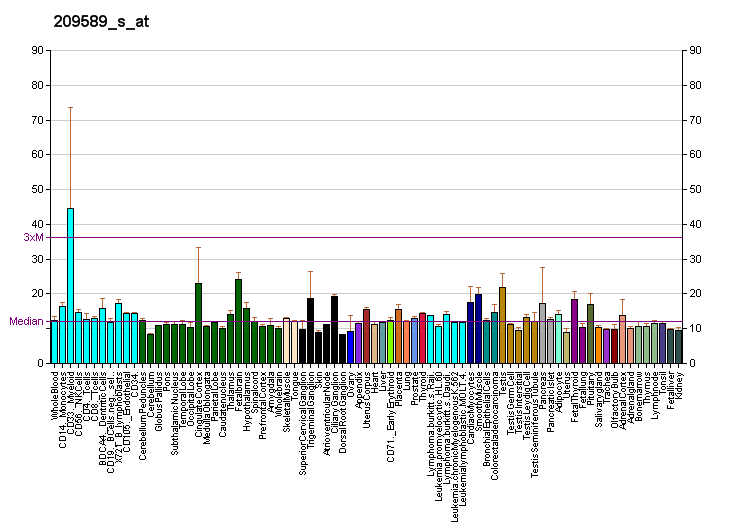
RNA expression pattern
Bgee	Human / Mouse (ortholog); Top expressed in: ganglionic eminence; ventricular zone; rectum; mucosa of transverse colon; cartilage tissue; mucosa of sigmoid colon; buccal mucosa cell; tendon of biceps brachii; duodenum; islet of Langerhans / Top expressed in: Rostral migratory stream; internal carotid artery; crypt of lieberkuhn of small intestine; tail of embryo; ventricular zone; genital tubercle; external carotid artery; Paneth cell; ganglionic eminence; efferent ductule; More reference expression data
BioGPS	More reference expression data
Gene ontology
Molecular function	transferase activity; nucleotide binding; protein kinase activity; transmembrane-ephrin receptor activity; kinase activity; protein binding; identical protein binding; transmembrane receptor protein tyrosine kinase activity; protein tyrosine kinase activity; signaling receptor binding; ATP binding; axon guidance receptor activity; ephrin receptor activity; amyloid-beta binding; signaling receptor activity; protein-containing complex binding
Cellular component	integral component of membrane; cytosol; cell projection; membrane; integral component of plasma membrane; extracellular region; axon; soma; dendrite; nucleus; plasma membrane; neuron projection; receptor complex; postsynapse; glutamatergic synapse; integral component of postsynaptic membrane; integral component of presynaptic membrane
Biological process	positive regulation of synapse assembly; roof of mouth development; phosphorylation; transmembrane receptor protein tyrosine kinase signaling pathway; optic nerve morphogenesis; ephrin receptor signaling pathway; learning; commissural neuron axon guidance; nervous system development; multicellular organism development; regulation of axonogenesis; dendritic spine development; dendritic spine morphogenesis; negative regulation of axonogenesis; protein phosphorylation; positive regulation of long-term neuronal synaptic plasticity; regulation of body fluid levels; inner ear morphogenesis; angiogenesis; cell morphogenesis; animal organ morphogenesis; regulation of neuronal synaptic plasticity; urogenital system development; peptidyl-tyrosine phosphorylation; corpus callosum development; central nervous system projection neuron axonogenesis; axonal fasciculation; camera-type eye morphogenesis; retinal ganglion cell axon guidance; axon guidance; trans-synaptic signaling by trans-synaptic complex, modulating synaptic transmission; negative regulation of protein phosphorylation; learning or memory; positive regulation of gene expression; positive regulation of synaptic plasticity; negative regulation of Ras protein signal transduction; regulation of synapse assembly; negative regulation of ERK1 and ERK2 cascade; postsynaptic membrane assembly; neuron projection retraction; positive regulation of long-term synaptic potentiation; positive regulation of protein localization to plasma membrane; negative regulation of NMDA glutamate receptor activity; positive regulation of NMDA glutamate receptor activity
Sources:Amigo / QuickGO
Orthologs
Databases	NCBI: entry; OMA: entry
Species	Human	Mouse
Entrez	2048	13844
Ensembl	ENSG00000133216	ENSMUSG00000028664
UniProt	P29323	P54763
RefSeq (mRNA)	NM_001309192; NM_001309193; NM_004442; NM_017449	NM_001290753; NM_010142
RefSeq (protein)	NP_001296121; NP_001296122; NP_004433; NP_059145	NP_001277682; NP_034272
Location (UCSC)	Chr 1: 22.71 – 22.92 Mb	Chr 4: 136.37 – 136.56 Mb
PubMed search
- Wikidata
View/Edit Human	View/Edit Mouse

Ephrin type-B receptor 2 is a protein that in humans is encoded by the EPHB2 gene.

== Function ==
Ephrin receptors and their ligands, the ephrins, mediate numerous developmental processes, particularly in the nervous system. Based on their structures and sequence relationships, ephrins are divided into the ephrin-A (EFNA) class, which are anchored to the membrane by a glycosylphosphatidylinositol linkage, and the ephrin-B (EFNB) class, which are transmembrane proteins. The Eph family of receptors are divided into two groups based on the similarity of their extracellular domain sequences and their affinities for binding ephrin-A and ephrin-B ligands. Ephrin receptors make up the largest subgroup of the receptor tyrosine kinase (RTK) family. The protein encoded by this gene is a receptor for ephrin-B family members.

== Animal studies ==
EphB2 is part of the NMDA signaling pathway and restoring expression rescues cognitive function in an animal model of Alzheimer's disease.

A recessive EphB2 gene is responsible for the crested-feather mutation in pigeons.

== Interactions ==
EPH receptor B2 has been shown to interact with:

- Abl gene
- RAS p21 protein activator 1
- Src
