= Sterile alpha motif =

SAM domain (Sterile alpha motif)

Identifiers
- Symbol: SAM_1
- Pfam: PF00536
- Pfam clan: CL0003
- InterPro: IPR001660
- SMART: SAM
- SCOP2: 1b0x / SCOPe / SUPFAM
- CDD: cd09487
Available protein structures:
- PDB: 1x40A:10-68 1oxjA:596-654 1sgg :930-993 1b4fE:911-975 1f0mA:911-975 1ucvA:932-992 1pk3C:804-869 1pk1D:804-869 1kw4A:1511-1575 IPR001660 PF00536 (ECOD; PDBsum)
- AlphaFold: IPR001660; PF00536

Ste50p-SAM
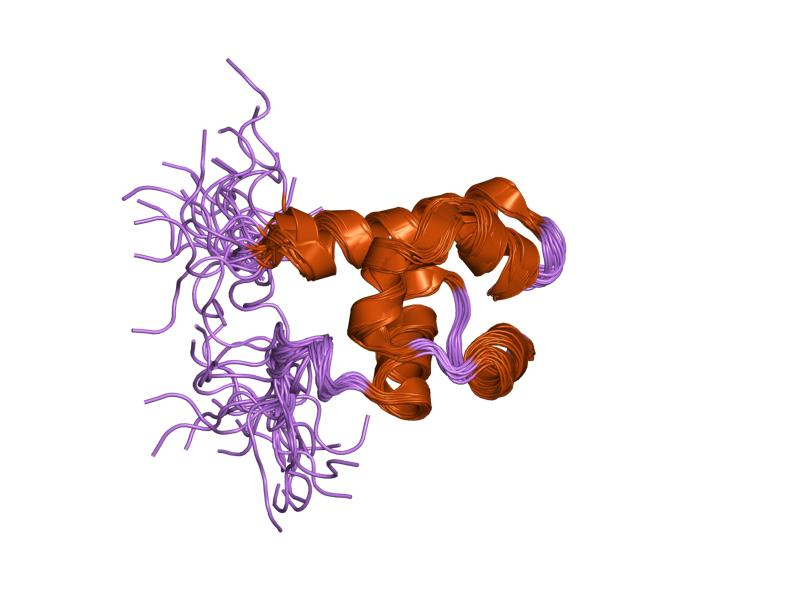
- SAM domain from fungal protein Ste50p

Identifiers
- Symbol: Ste50p-SAM
- Pfam: PF09235
- Pfam clan: CL0003
- InterPro: IPR015316
- SCOP2: 1uqv / SCOPe / SUPFAM
Available protein structures:
- PDB: IPR015316 PF09235 (ECOD; PDBsum)
- AlphaFold: IPR015316; PF09235

In molecular biology, the protein domain Sterile alpha motif (or SAM) is a putative protein interaction module present in a wide variety of proteins involved in many biological processes. The SAM domain that spreads over around 70 residues is found in diverse eukaryotic organisms. SAM domains have been shown to homo- and hetero-oligomerise, forming multiple self-association architectures and also binding to various non-SAM domain-containing proteins, nevertheless with a low affinity constant.

SAM domains also appear to possess the ability to bind RNA. Smaug, a protein that helps to establish a morphogen gradient in Drosophila embryos by repressing the translation of nanos (nos) mRNA, binds to the 3' untranslated region (UTR) of nos mRNA via two similar hairpin structures. The 3D crystal structure of the Smaug RNA-binding region shows a cluster of positively charged residues on the Smaug-SAM domain, which could be the RNA-binding surface. This electropositive potential is unique among all previously determined SAM-domain structures and is conserved among Smaug-SAM homologs. These results suggest that the SAM domain might have a primary role in RNA binding.

Structural analyses show that the SAM domain is arranged in a small five-helix bundle with two large interfaces. In the case of the SAM domain of EPHB2, each of these interfaces is able to form dimers. The presence of these two distinct intermonomers binding surface suggest that SAM could form extended polymeric structures.

== Fungal SAM ==
In molecular biology, the protein domain Ste50p mainly in fungi and some other types of eukaryotes. It plays a role in the mitogen-activated protein kinase cascades, a type of cell signalling that helps the cell respond to external stimuli, more specifically mating, cell growth, and osmo-tolerance in fungi.

=== Function ===
The protein domain Ste50p has a role in detecting pheromones for mating. It is thought to be found bound to Ste11p in order to prolong the pheromone-induced signaling response. Furthermore, it is also involved in aiding the cell to respond to nitrogen starvation.

=== Structure ===
The fungal Ste50p SAM consists of six helices, which form a compact, globular fold. It is a monomer in solution and often undergoes heterodimerisation (and in some cases oligomerisation) of the protein.

=== Protein interaction ===
The SAM domain of Ste50p often interacts with the SAM domain of Ste11p. They form bonds through this association. The SAM domain of one protein will bind to the SAM of a different protein. SAM domains do not self-associate in vitro. There is significant evidence for Ste50p oligomerization in vivo.

== Human proteins containing this domain ==
ANKS1A; ANKS1B; ANKS3; ANKS4B; ANKS6; BFAR; BICC1; CASKIN1; CASKIN2; CENTD1; CNKSR2; CNKSR3; DDHD2; EPHA1; EPHA10; EPHA2; EPHA5; EPHA6; EPHA7; EPHA8; EPHB1; EPHB2; EPHB3; EPHB4; FAM59A; HPH2; INPPL1; L3MBTL3; PHC1; PHC2; PHC3; PPFIA1; PPFIA2; PPFIA3; PPFIA4; PPFIBP1; PPFIBP2; SAMD1; SAMD13; SAMD14; SAMD3; SAMD4A; SAMD4B; SAMD5; SAMD7; SAMD8; SAMD9; SARM1; SCMH1; SCML1; SCML2; SEC23IP; SGMS1; SHANK1; SHANK2; SHANK3; STARD13; UBP1; USH1G; ZCCHC14; p63; p73;
