= ANKS1A =

Protein-coding gene in the species Homo sapiens

Identifiers
- Aliases: ANKS1A, ANKS1, ankyrin repeat and sterile alpha motif domain containing 1A
- External IDs: OMIM: 608994; MGI: 2446180; GeneCards: ANKS1A
Available structures
PDB	Ortholog search: PDBe RCSB
PDB	List of PDB id codes 2LMR, 2MYQ

Gene location (Human)
Chr.	Chromosome 6 (human)
Band	6p21.31	Start	34,889,255 bp
Band	6p21.31	End	35,091,406 bp

Gene location (Mouse)
Chr.	Chromosome 17 (mouse)
Band	17|17 A3.3	Start	28,128,280 bp
Band	17|17 A3.3	End	28,281,749 bp
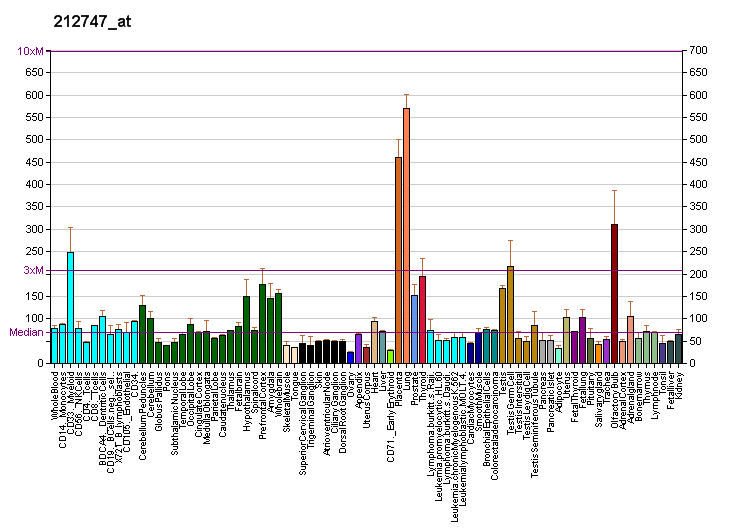
RNA expression pattern
Bgee	Human / Mouse (ortholog); Top expressed in: olfactory bulb; trigeminal ganglion; spinal ganglia; seminal vesicula; endothelial cell; saphenous vein; paraflocculus of cerebellum; bronchial epithelial cell; amniotic fluid; mucosa of urinary bladder / Top expressed in: interventricular septum; granulocyte; neural layer of retina; lip; utricle; vestibular membrane of cochlear duct; myocardium of ventricle; cerebellar cortex; cardiac muscles; sciatic nerve; More reference expression data
BioGPS	More reference expression data
Gene ontology
Molecular function	protein binding; ephrin receptor binding
Cellular component	neuron projection; cell projection; nucleoplasm; cytoplasm; cytosol
Biological process	ephrin receptor signaling pathway; neuron remodeling; substrate-dependent cell migration; regulation of ephrin receptor signaling pathway
Sources:Amigo / QuickGO
Orthologs
Databases	NCBI: entry; OMA: entry
Species	Human	Mouse
Entrez	23294	224650
Ensembl	ENSG00000064999	ENSMUSG00000024219
UniProt	Q92625	P59672
RefSeq (mRNA)	NM_015245	NM_001286040; NM_001286041; NM_181413; NM_001374802
RefSeq (protein)	NP_056060	NP_001272969; NP_001272970; NP_852078
Location (UCSC)	Chr 6: 34.89 – 35.09 Mb	Chr 17: 28.13 – 28.28 Mb
PubMed search
- Wikidata
View/Edit Human	View/Edit Mouse

Ankyrin repeat and SAM domain-containing protein 1A (ANKS1A), also known as ODIN, is a protein that in humans is encoded by the ANKS1A gene on chromosome 6.

It is ubiquitously expressed in many tissues and cell types. ODIN is known to regulate the epidermal growth factor receptor (EGFR) and EphA receptor signaling pathways. As a Src family kinase target, ODIN has been implicated in the development of cancer. The ANKS1A gene also contains one of 27 SNPs associated with increased risk of coronary artery disease.

== Structure ==
=== Gene ===
The ANKS1A gene resides on chromosome 6 at the band 6p21.31 and includes 29 exons. This gene produces 2 isoforms through alternative splicing.

=== Protein ===
ODIN is a member of the ankyrin repeat and sterile alpha motif domain-containing (ANKS) family and contains 6 ankyrin repeats, 1 phosphotyrosine binding (PTD) domain, and 2 tandem sterile alpha motif (SAM) domains. The first SAM domain binds to the SAM domain of the EphA2 receptor by adopting a mid-loop/end-helix conformation and may regulate EphA2 endocytosis.

== Function ==
ODIN is widely expressed in tissues including heart, brain, placenta, lung, liver, skeletal muscle, kidney and pancreas. ODIN has been identified as one of the tyrosine phosphorylated proteins induced by activating epidermal growth factor or platelet-derived growth factor receptor tyrosine kinases. ODIN is involved in negative regulation of the EGFR signaling pathway. It is reported that ODIN level is correlated with the degree of increased EGF-induced EGFR trafficking to recycle endosomes and recycle back to the cell surface, suggesting a role in EGFR recycling. Furthermore, ODIN serves as a key adaptor protein regulating the EphA receptor signaling pathway, which is critical for regulating EphA8-mediated cell migration and neurite outgrowth. It has been demonstrated that deletion of the phosphotyrosine binding domain in ODIN will lead to an immaturely developed subcommissural organ (SCO) with a severe midbrain hydrocephalic phenotype, which means ODIN also plays a role in the proper development of the SCO and in ependymal cells in the cerebral aqueduct.

== Clinical significance ==
As a novel target of Src family kinases, which are implicated in the development of some colorectal cancers, ODIN may be involved in cancer cell signaling mechanisms. In a study, 64 colorectal cancer cell lines were tested for their expression of Lck. Mass spectrometric analyses of Lck-purified proteins subsequently identified several proteins readily known as SFK kinase substrates, including cortactin, Tom1L1 (SRCASM), GIT1, vimentin and AFAP1L2 (XB130). Additional proteins previously reported as substrates of other tyrosine kinases were also detected, including ODIN. ODIN was further analyzed and found to contain substantially less pY upon inhibition of SFK activity in SW620 cells, indicating that it is a formerly unknown SFK target in colorectal carcinoma cells. Furthermore, it has been found that ODIN regulates COPII-mediated anterograde transport of receptor tyrosine kinases, which is a critical mechanism in the process of tumor genesis.

=== Clinical marker ===
A multi-locus genetic risk score study based on a combination of 27 loci, including the ANKS1A gene, identified individuals at increased risk for both incident and recurrent coronary artery disease events, as well as an enhanced clinical benefit from statin therapy. The study was based on a community cohort study (the Malmo Diet and Cancer study) and four additional randomized controlled trials of primary prevention cohorts (JUPITER and ASCOT) and secondary prevention cohorts (CARE and PROVE IT-TIMI 22).
