= Migration-inducting gene 7 =

Genetic element in the species Homo sapiens

MIG7

Identifiers
- Aliases: Migration inducting gene 7mig-7
- External IDs: GeneCards: ; OMA:- orthologs
Orthologs
Species	Human	Mouse
Entrez	723788	n/a
Ensembl	n/a	n/a
UniProt	n a	n/a
RefSeq (mRNA)	n/a	n/a
RefSeq (protein)	n/a	n/a
Location (UCSC)	n/a	n/a
PubMed search		n/a
- Wikidata
View/Edit Human

Migration inducting gene 7 (Mig-7 or Mig7) is a gene that corresponds to a cysteine-rich protein localized to the cell membrane and cytoplasm. It is the first-in-class of novel proteins translated from what are thought to be long Non-coding RNAs.

Induction of Mig-7 expression occurs downstream of Epidermal growth factor/Epidermal growth factor receptor, Cox-2/PGE-2 or Hepatocyte growth factor/c-Met activation and signalling. Data has shown that Mig-7 expression is specific to human embryonic/fetal cytotrophoblast cells and epithelial type cancer cells, while not expressed in normal cells. Data demonstrate that targeting of Mig-7 simultaneously inhibits more than one cancer-progressing pathway while likely sparing normal cells.

== Expression ==
Mig-7 expression is found on, as well as in, epithelial tumor cells at the primary site, secondary (metastatic) sites, and blood from cancer patients. It is not produced by cells of normal human tissues or by cells from patients with inflammation but is expressed by epithelial precancerous and malignant cells. It is also expressed in fetal/embryonic cytotrophoblast cells of early placenta.

Mig-7 expression increases in malignant cancers. There is a high sensitivity and specificity of Mig-7 detection in breast (98% n=48 of 49), uterine (100% n=49), gastric (94.5% n=104 of 110) and lung (100% n=89) cancers.

== Function and role in cancer ==
Mig-7 is thought to promote carcinoma cell invasion, metastasis and tumor growth through vasculogenic mimicry, a process where tumor cells form channels for fluids to flow through. It also promotes epithelial–mesenchymal transition (EMT), a key developmental program that is often activated during, and required for, cancer invasion/metastasis. Mig-7 induces EMT through hyperactivation of Akt and extracellular regulated Kinase ERK1/2 by inhibiting the tumor suppressor protein phosphate 2A.

Mig-7 has been associated with signaling pathways downstream of epithelial type cancer-promoting kinases. It is expressed prior to TWIST, the previously named “master regulator” of EMT. It has also been shown to promote tumor neovascularization.

Cancer cell metabolism (also known as oxidative glycolysis or the Warburg effect) is a proposed cancer target and is likely regulated by Mig-7 through its hyperactivation of Akt.

== Targeting of Mig-7 ==
Targeting of Mig-7 with Mig-7-specific peptides significantly stimulates breast cancer patients’ immune cells’ killing of breast carcinoma cells ex vivo. Targeting with antibody generated to the peptide representing the first nine amino acids of Mig-7 detects cells expressing this protein and significantly inhibits carcinoma cell invasion in vitro. Targeting with short hairpin RNA, specific to decrease Mig-7 protein levels, inhibits carcinoma cell invasion and metastasis as well as returns ERK1/2, Akt, GSK, and S6 kinase to normal phosphorylation states through reactivation of PP2A.
