= Ephrin A1 =

Protein found in humans

EFNA1
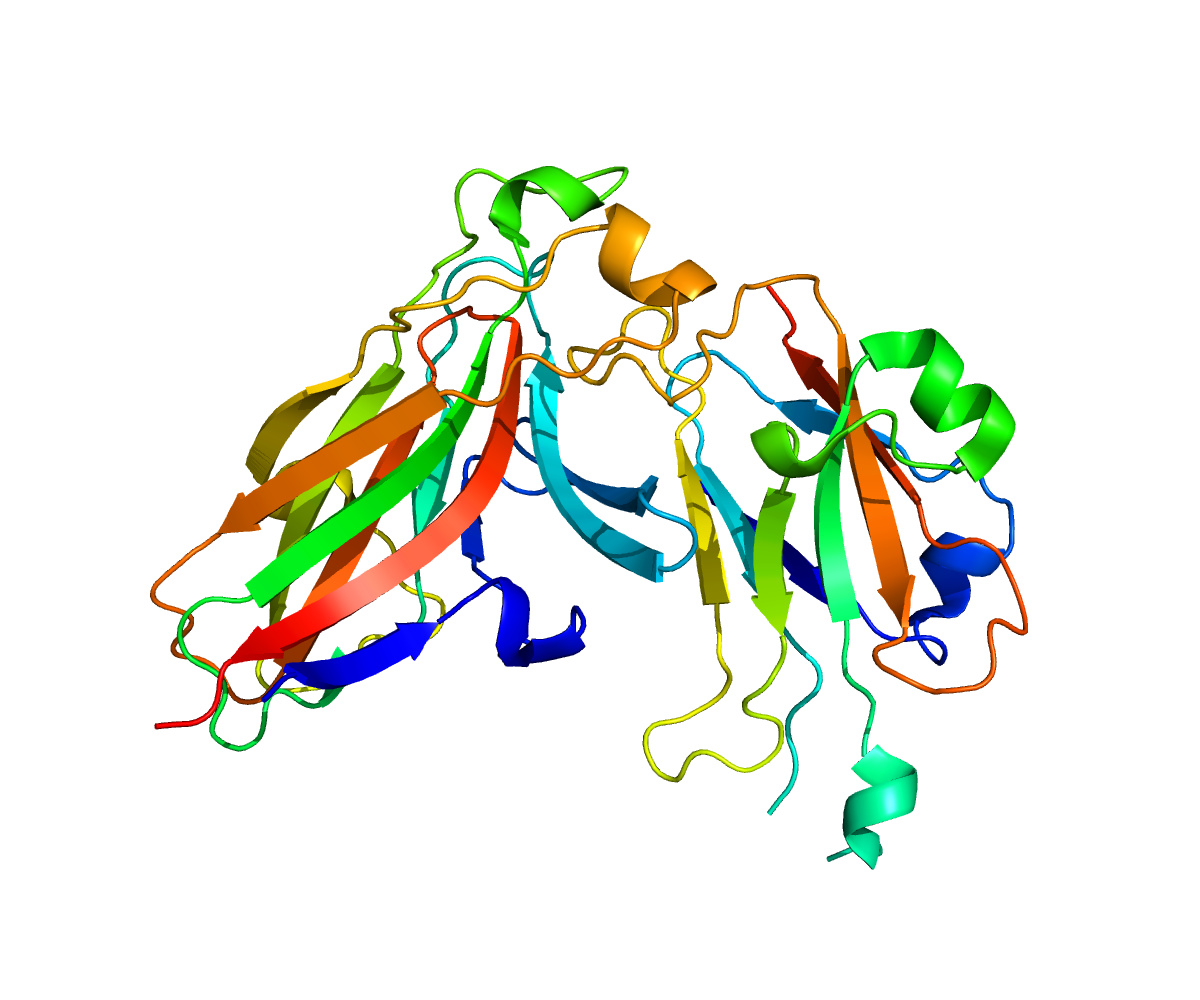

Identifiers
- Aliases: EFNA1, B61, ECKLG, EFL1, EPLG1, LERK-1, LERK1, TNFAIP4, Ephrin A1, GMAN
- External IDs: OMIM: 191164; MGI: 103236; GeneCards: EFNA1
Available structures
PDB	Ortholog search: PDBe RCSB
PDB	List of PDB id codes 3HEI, 3MBW, 3CZU

Gene location (Human)
Chr.	Chromosome 1 (human)
Band	1q22	Start	155,127,876 bp
Band	1q22	End	155,134,899 bp

Gene location (Mouse)
Chr.	Chromosome 3 (mouse)
Band	3 F1|3 39.04 cM	Start	89,179,040 bp
Band	3 F1|3 39.04 cM	End	89,188,449 bp
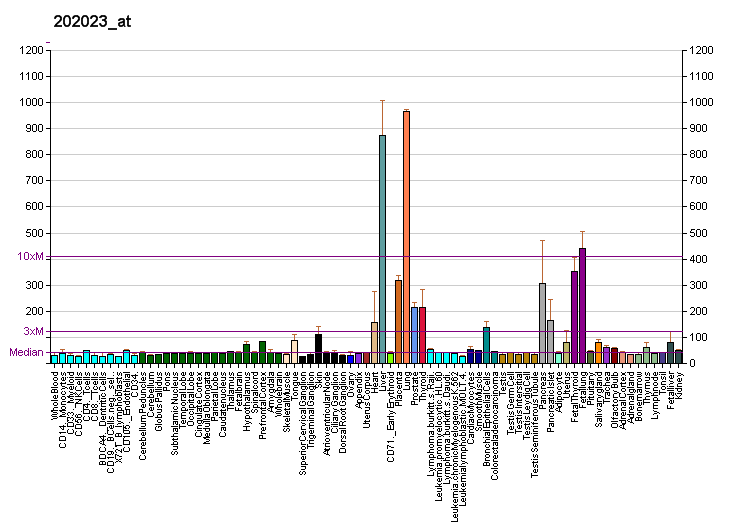
RNA expression pattern
Bgee	Human / Mouse (ortholog); Top expressed in: right lobe of liver; right lung; skin of abdomen; skin of leg; upper lobe of left lung; left lobe of thyroid gland; right lobe of thyroid gland; minor salivary glands; parotid gland; rectum / Top expressed in: lip; left lung lobe; right lung lobe; lumbar spinal ganglion; right kidney; colon; duodenum; corneal stroma; jejunum; proximal tubule; More reference expression data
BioGPS	More reference expression data
Gene ontology
Molecular function	protein binding; signaling receptor binding; ephrin receptor binding
Cellular component	membrane; plasma membrane; integral component of plasma membrane; anchored component of membrane; extracellular exosome; intracellular anatomical structure; extracellular region; anchored component of plasma membrane
Biological process	regulation of cell adhesion mediated by integrin; ephrin receptor signaling pathway; aortic valve morphogenesis; cell-cell signaling; negative regulation of transcription by RNA polymerase II; regulation of angiogenesis; mitral valve morphogenesis; endocardial cushion to mesenchymal transition involved in heart valve formation; regulation of blood vessel endothelial cell migration; regulation of axonogenesis; neuron differentiation; notochord; positive regulation of peptidyl-tyrosine phosphorylation; substrate adhesion-dependent cell spreading; cell migration; negative regulation of epithelial to mesenchymal transition; negative regulation of dendritic spine morphogenesis; regulation of peptidyl-tyrosine phosphorylation; negative regulation of thymocyte apoptotic process; MAPK cascade; angiogenesis; axon guidance; positive regulation of protein phosphorylation; negative regulation of MAPK cascade; positive regulation of MAPK cascade; protein stabilization; positive regulation of protein tyrosine kinase activity; positive regulation of amyloid-beta formation; positive regulation of aspartic-type endopeptidase activity involved in amyloid precursor protein catabolic process; negative regulation of proteolysis involved in cellular protein catabolic process
Sources:Amigo / QuickGO
Orthologs
Databases	NCBI: entry; OMA: entry
Species	Human	Mouse
Entrez	1942	13636
Ensembl	ENSG00000169242	ENSMUSG00000027954
UniProt	P20827	P52793
RefSeq (mRNA)	NM_004428; NM_182685	NM_001162425; NM_010107
RefSeq (protein)	NP_004419; NP_872626	NP_001155897; NP_034237
Location (UCSC)	Chr 1: 155.13 – 155.13 Mb	Chr 3: 89.18 – 89.19 Mb
PubMed search
- Wikidata
View/Edit Human	View/Edit Mouse

Ephrin A1 is a protein that in humans is encoded by the EFNA1 gene.

This gene encodes a member of the ephrin (EPH) family. The ephrins and EPH-related receptors comprise the largest subfamily of receptor protein-tyrosine kinases and have been implicated in mediating developmental events, especially in the nervous system and in erythropoiesis. Based on their structures and sequence relationships, ephrins are divided into the ephrin-A (EFNA) class, which are anchored to the membrane by a glycosylphosphatidylinositol linkage, and the ephrin-B (EFNB) class, which are transmembrane proteins. This gene encodes an EFNA class ephrin which binds to the EPHA2, EPHA4, EPHA5, EPHA6, and EPHA7 receptors. Two transcript variants that encode different isoforms were identified through sequence analysis.
