= Bifunctional apoptosis regulator =

Enzyme found in humans

BFAR

Identifiers
- Aliases: BFAR, BAR, RNF47, bifunctional apoptosis regulator
- External IDs: MGI: 1914368; GeneCards: BFAR
Available structures
PDB	Ortholog search: PDBe RCSB
PDB	List of PDB id codes 1V85
Enzyme activity
EC #	BRENDA	ExPASy	KEGG	MetaCyc
2.3.2.27	↗	↗	↗	↗

Gene location (Human)
Chr.	Chromosome 16 (human)
Band	16p13.12	Start	14,632,931 bp
Band	16p13.12	End	14,669,236 bp
RNA expression pattern
Bgee	Human / Mouse (ortholog); Top expressed in: islet of Langerhans; right lung; rectum; body of pancreas; smooth muscle tissue; gallbladder; placenta; upper lobe of left lung; stromal cell of endometrium; duodenum / n/a; More reference expression data
BioGPS	n/a
Gene ontology
Molecular function	protein-macromolecule adaptor activity; protein binding; metal ion binding; caspase binding; ubiquitin protein ligase activity
Cellular component	integral component of membrane; integral component of endoplasmic reticulum membrane; integral component of plasma membrane; endoplasmic reticulum; membrane; endoplasmic reticulum membrane
Biological process	protein K63-linked ubiquitination; negative regulation of IRE1-mediated unfolded protein response; protein K48-linked ubiquitination; protein polyubiquitination; negative regulation of apoptotic process; proteasome-mediated ubiquitin-dependent protein catabolic process; protein autoubiquitination; apoptotic process; ubiquitin-dependent protein catabolic process
Sources:Amigo / QuickGO
Orthologs
Databases	NCBI: entry; OMA: entry
Species	Human	Mouse
Entrez	51283	67118
Ensembl	ENSG00000103429; ENSG00000275618	ENSMUSG00000022684
UniProt	Q9NZS9	Q8R079
RefSeq (mRNA)	NM_016561; NM_001330500	NM_001177552; NM_025976; NM_025653
RefSeq (protein)	NP_001317429; NP_057645	NP_001171023; NP_079929; NP_080252
Location (UCSC)	Chr 16: 14.63 – 14.67 Mb	n/a
PubMed search
- Wikidata
View/Edit Human	View/Edit Mouse

Bifunctional apoptosis regulator is an enzyme that in humans is encoded by the BFAR gene. This enzyme is embedded in the membrane of the endoplasmic reticulum where it is involved in regulating and inhibiting apoptosis (controlled cell death). It acts as a E3 ubiquitin ligase, and is involved in the ubiquitination or degradation of the proteins Bax inhibitor 1, TGF beta receptor 1, and PNPLA3.

== Function ==
Enables caspase binding activity; protein-macromolecule adaptor activity; and ubiquitin protein ligase activity. Involved in negative regulation of IRE1-mediated unfolded protein response; proteasome-mediated ubiquitin-dependent protein catabolic process; and protein ubiquitination. Acts upstream of or within negative regulation of apoptotic process.
