= Smaug (protein) =

RNA-binding protein in Drosophila

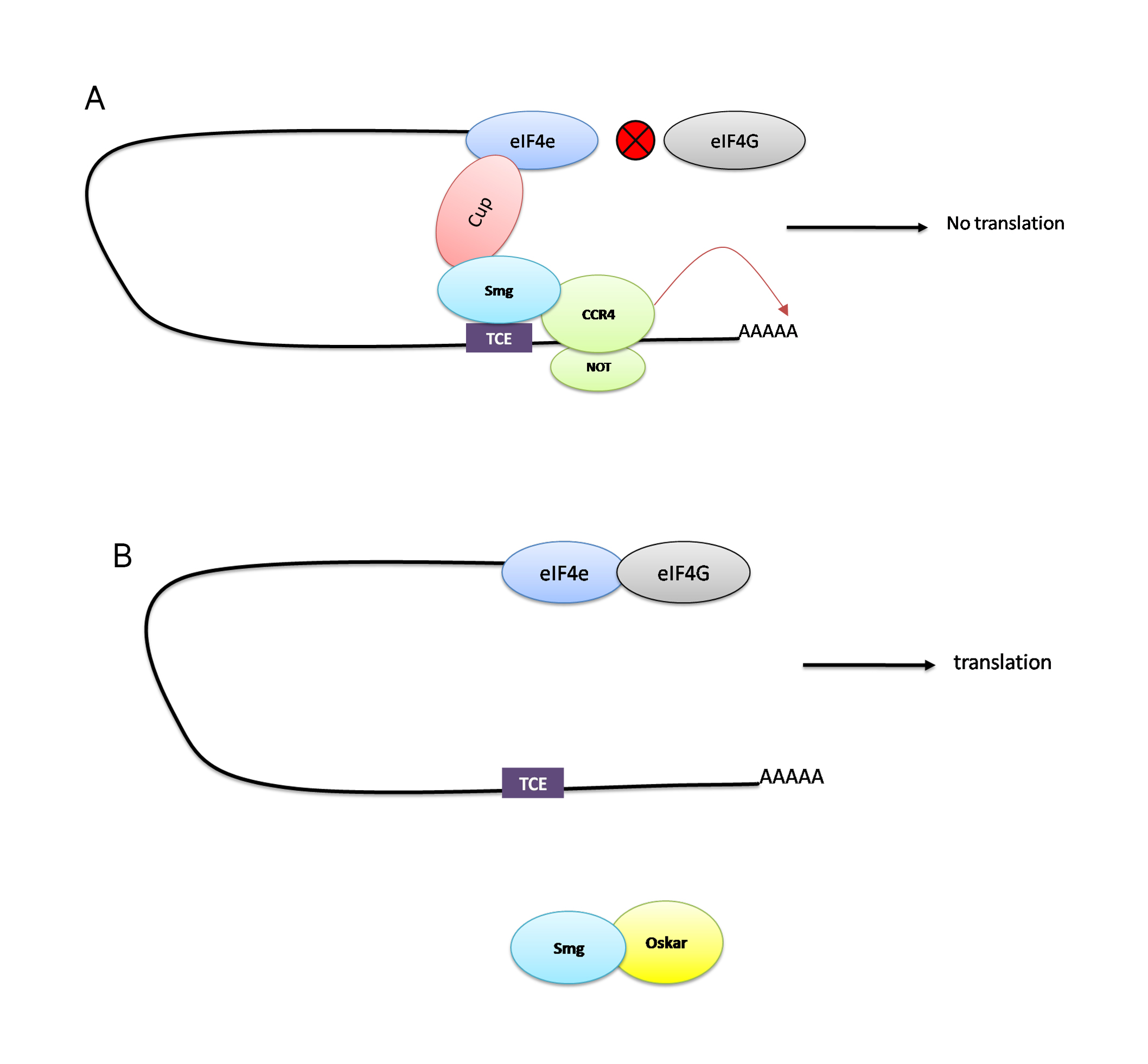
Translational control of nanos mRNA by Smaug protein in Drosophila melanogaster

Smaug is a RNA-binding protein in Drosophila that helps in maternal to zygotic transition (MZT). The protein is named after the fictional character Smaug, the dragon in J.R.R. Tolkien's 1937 novel The Hobbit. The MZT ends with the midblastula transition (MBT), which is defined as the first developmental event in Drosophila that depends on zygotic mRNA. In Drosophila, the initial developmental events are controlled by maternal mRNAs like Hsp83, nanos, string, Pgc, and cyclin B mRNA. Degradation of these mRNAs, which is expected to terminate maternal control and enable zygotic control of embryogenesis, happens at interphase of nuclear division cycle 14. During this transition smaug protein targets the maternal mRNA for destruction using miRs. Thus activating the zygotic genes. Smaug is expected to play a role in expression of three miRNAs – miR-3, miR-6, miR-309 and miR-286 during MZT in Drosophila. Among them smaug dependent expression of miR-309 is needed for destabilization of 410 maternal mRNAs. In smaug mutants almost 85% of maternal mRNA is found to be stable. Smaug also binds to 3′ untranslated region (UTR) elements known as SMG response elements (SREs) on nanos mRNA and represses its expression by recruiting a protein called Cup (an eIF4E-binding protein that blocks the binding of eIF4G to eIF4E). There after it recruits deadenylation complex CCR4-Not on to the nanos mRNA which leads to deadenylation and subsequent decay of the mRNA. It is also found to be involved in degradation and repression of maternal Hsp83 mRNA by recruiting CCR4/POP2/NOT deadenylase to the mRNA. The human Smaug protein homologs are SAMD4A and SAMD4B.
