= ACP1 =

Protein-coding gene in humans

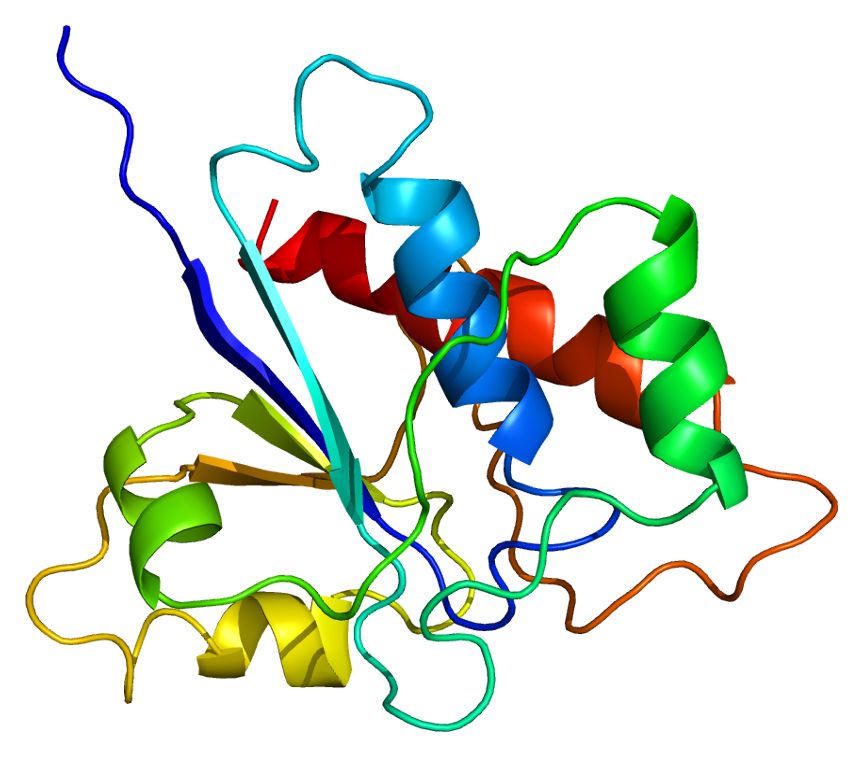

Identifiers
- Aliases: ACP1, HAAP, LMW-PTP, acid phosphatase 1, soluble, LMWPTP, acid phosphatase 1
- External IDs: OMIM: 171500; MGI: 87881; GeneCards: ACP1
Available structures
| PDB | Ortholog search: PDBe RCSB |
| PDB | List of PDB id codes 1XWW, 3N8I, 4Z99, 4Z9A, 4Z9B, 5PNT |
Enzyme activity
| EC # | BRENDA | ExPASy | KEGG | MetaCyc |
|---|---|---|---|---|
| 3.1.3.2 | ↗ | ↗ | ↗ | ↗ |
| 3.1.3.48 | ↗ | ↗ | ↗ | ↗ |

Gene location (Human)
| Chr. | Chromosome 2 (human) |
| Band | 2p25.3 | Start | 264,140 bp |
| Band | 2p25.3 | End | 278,283 bp |

Gene location (Mouse)
| Chr. | Chromosome 12 (mouse) |
| Band | 12|12 A2 | Start | 30,943,325 bp |
| Band | 12|12 A2 | End | 30,961,588 bp |
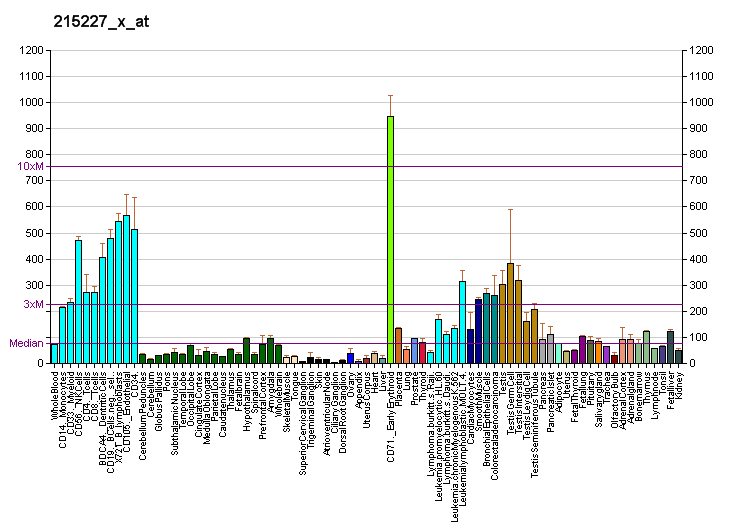

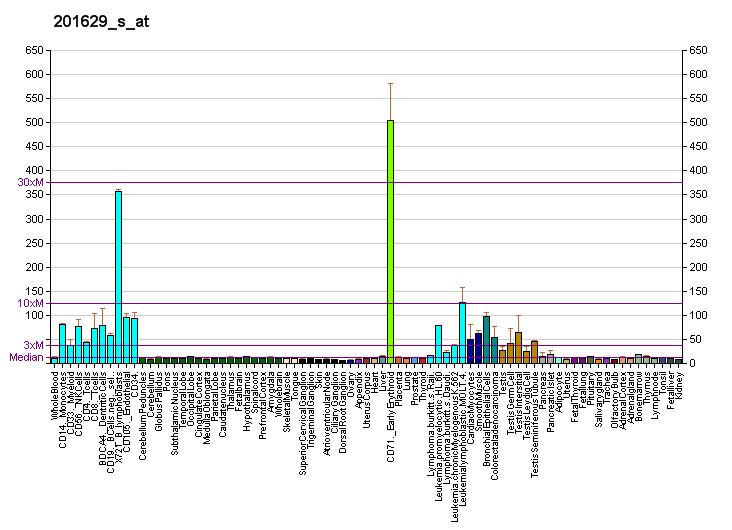

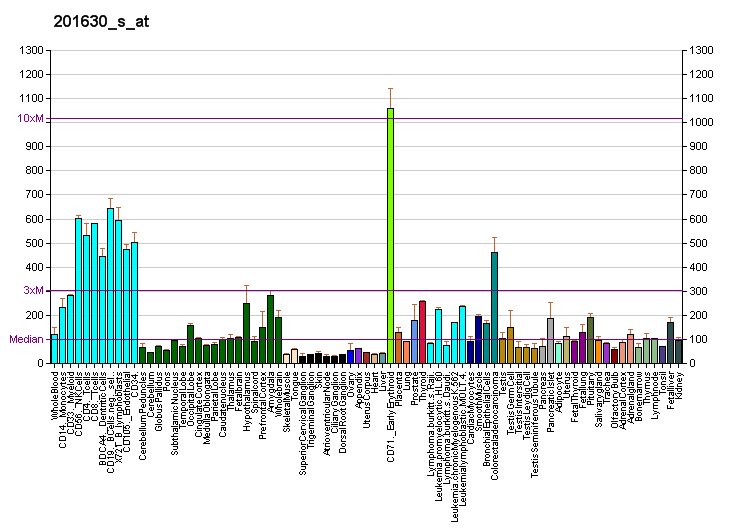
RNA expression pattern
| Bgee | Human / Mouse (ortholog); Top expressed in: sperm; Achilles tendon; left adrenal gland; right adrenal cortex; left adrenal cortex; ventricular zone; islet of Langerhans; body of pancreas; right testis; embryo / Top expressed in: embryo; embryo; genital tubercle; right kidney; tail of embryo; blastocyst; ventricular zone; yolk sac; spermatid; muscle of thigh; More reference expression data |
| BioGPS | More reference expression data |
Gene ontology
| Molecular function | protein tyrosine phosphatase activity; phosphatase activity; phosphoprotein phosphatase activity; hydrolase activity; protein binding; non-membrane spanning protein tyrosine phosphatase activity; acid phosphatase activity |
| Cellular component | cytoplasm; cytoplasmic side of plasma membrane; extracellular exosome; cytosol; sarcolemma |
| Biological process | protein dephosphorylation; peptidyl-tyrosine dephosphorylation |
Sources:Amigo / QuickGO
Orthologs
| Databases | NCBI: entry; OMA: entry |
| Species | Human | Mouse |
| Entrez | 52 | 11431 |
| Ensembl | ENSG00000143727 | ENSMUSG00000044573 |
| UniProt | P24666 | Q9D358 |
| RefSeq (mRNA) | NM_001040649; NM_004300; NM_007099; NM_177554 | NM_001110239; NM_021330 |
| RefSeq (protein) | NP_001035739; NP_004291; NP_009030 | NP_001103709; NP_067305 |
| Location (UCSC) | Chr 2: 0.26 – 0.28 Mb | Chr 12: 30.94 – 30.96 Mb |
| PubMed search |
- Wikidata
| View/Edit Human | View/Edit Mouse |

Low molecular weight phosphotyrosine protein phosphatase is an enzyme that in humans is encoded by the ACP1 gene.

The product of this gene belongs to the phosphotyrosine protein phosphatase family of proteins. It functions as an acid phosphatase and a protein tyrosine phosphatase by hydrolyzing protein tyrosine phosphate to protein tyrosine and orthophosphate. This enzyme also hydrolyzes orthophosphoric monoesters to alcohol and orthophosphate. This gene is genetically polymorphic, and three common alleles segregating at the corresponding locus give rise to six phenotypes. Each allele appears to encode at least two electrophoretically different isozymes, Bf and Bs, which are produced in allele-specific ratios. Three transcript variants encoding distinct isoforms have been identified for this gene.

== Clinical significance ==
Clinically, increased expression of ACP1 is a biomarker for poor prognosis in prostate cancer has been linked to worse clinical behaviour of prostate cancer, possibly outperforming the widely used Gleason grading system with respect to this important parameter. Also in other cancers, e.g. colon cancer, high ACP1 protein levels are linked to aggressive disease. It has been suggested that ACP1 acts as a bona fide oncogene, but for now this notion remains unproven even if ACP1 overexpression drives cells towards a Warburg effect-like glycolytic phenotype. Apart from cancer, ACP1 has also been linked to osteoporosis as the enzyme plays an important role in the interaction of the osteocyte with the bone environment, while its inhibition appears useful for counteracting experimental [venous thromboembolism]. Currently, there are no clinically approved inhibitors that allow targeting ACP1 in patients.

== Interactions ==
ACP1 has been shown to interact with EPH receptor A2 and EPH receptor B1. The proto-oncogene Src has been suggested to be a direct target for ACP1 tyrosine phosphatase activity, but this has not been formally proven.
