= SAMD9 =

Protein-coding gene in the species Homo sapiens

Identifiers
- Aliases: SAMD9, C7orf5, DRIF1, NFTC, OEF1, OEF2, sterile alpha motif domain containing 9, MIRAGE, M7MLS2
- External IDs: OMIM: 610456; GeneCards: SAMD9

Gene location (Human)
Chr.	Chromosome 7 (human)
Band	7q21.2	Start	93,099,513 bp
Band	7q21.2	End	93,118,023 bp
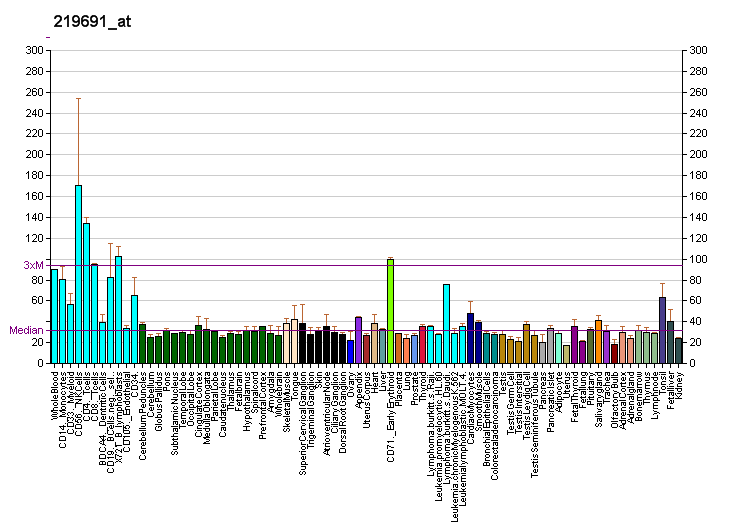

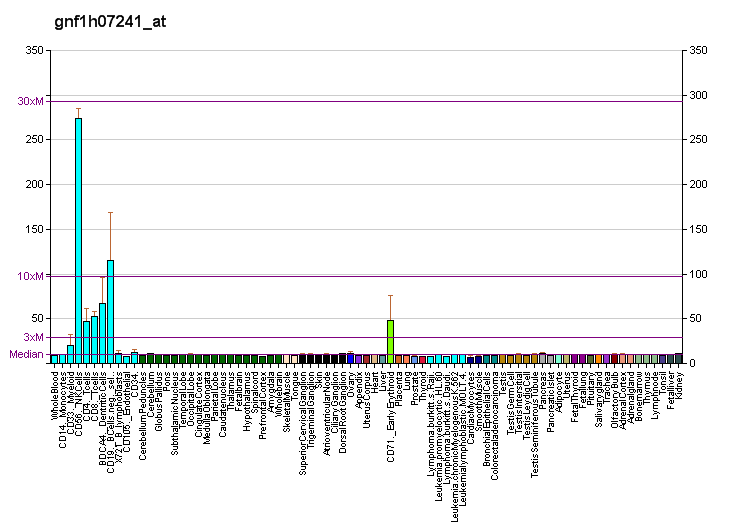
RNA expression pattern
Bgee	Human / Mouse (ortholog); Top expressed in: amniotic fluid; oral cavity; buccal mucosa cell; mucosa of pharynx; gums; gingival epithelium; palpebral conjunctiva; decidua; epithelium of nasopharynx; trabecular bone / n/a; More reference expression data
BioGPS	More reference expression data
Gene ontology
Molecular function	protein binding
Cellular component	cytoplasm; intracellular membrane-bounded organelle; cytosol; early endosome
Biological process	endosomal vesicle fusion
Sources:Amigo / QuickGO
Orthologs
Databases	NCBI: entry; OMA: entry
Species	Human	Mouse
Entrez	54809	n/a
Ensembl	ENSG00000205413	n/a
UniProt	Q5K651	n/a
RefSeq (mRNA)	NM_017654; NM_001193307	n/a
RefSeq (protein)	NP_001180236; NP_060124	n/a
Location (UCSC)	Chr 7: 93.1 – 93.12 Mb	n/a
PubMed search		n/a
- Wikidata
View/Edit Human

Sterile alpha motif domain-containing protein 9 is a 1,589-amino-acid protein encoded by the SAMD9 gene. This cytoplasmic protein is a tumor suppressor that has a role in cell proliferation and the innate immune response to viral infection. Like its paralog, SAMD9-like (SAMD9L) protein, its N-terminus contains a sterile alpha motif (SAM).

Deleterious mutations of this gene cause normophosphatemic familial tumoral calcinosis (NFTC). On the other hand, mutations that increase the activity of SAMD9 cause myelodysplasia, infection, restriction of growth, adrenal hypoplasia (small adrenal glands with diminished function), genital phenotypes, and enteropathy (MIRAGE) syndrome. This can lead to loss of chromosome 7 as described for monosomy 7 and myelodysplastic syndrome and leukemia syndrome-2 (M7MLS2). Loss of chromosome 7/7q may be an adaptation to a growth restriction inherent in SAMD9/9L mutant cells.
