= SAMD4A =

Protein-coding gene in the species Homo sapiens

Identifiers
- Aliases: SAMD4A, SAMD4, SMAUG, SMAUG1, SMG, SMGA, sterile alpha motif domain containing 4A
- External IDs: OMIM: 610747; MGI: 1921730; GeneCards: SAMD4A

Gene location (Human)
Chr.	Chromosome 14 (human)
Band	14q22.2	Start	54,567,097 bp
Band	14q22.2	End	54,793,315 bp

Gene location (Mouse)
Chr.	Chromosome 14 (mouse)
Band	14|14 C1	Start	47,120,311 bp
Band	14|14 C1	End	47,343,272 bp
RNA expression pattern
Bgee	Human / Mouse (ortholog); Top expressed in: dorsal motor nucleus of vagus nerve; inferior olivary nucleus; right ventricle; Skeletal muscle tissue of rectus abdominis; biceps brachii; Skeletal muscle tissue of biceps brachii; glutes; myocardium of left ventricle; left testis; tail of epididymis / Top expressed in: seminiferous tubule; spermatid; tunica media of zone of aorta; soleus muscle; triceps brachii muscle; ankle; temporal muscle; digastric muscle; umbilical cord; myocardium of ventricle; More reference expression data
BioGPS	n/a
Gene ontology
Molecular function	protein binding; translation repressor activity; mRNA binding; RNA binding
Cellular component	cytoplasm; neuron projection; dendrite; cell projection; synapse; P-body; fibrillar center; cytosol; cell junction
Biological process	regulation of translation; positive regulation of translation; negative regulation of translation; nuclear-transcribed mRNA poly(A) tail shortening; regulation of mRNA stability; regulation of transcription, DNA-templated
Sources:Amigo / QuickGO
Orthologs
Databases	NCBI: entry; OMA: entry
Species	Human	Mouse
Entrez	23034	74480
Ensembl	ENSG00000020577	ENSMUSG00000021838
UniProt	Q9UPU9	Q8CBY1
RefSeq (mRNA)	NM_015589; NM_001161576; NM_001161577	NM_001037221; NM_001163433; NM_028966; NM_001310544
RefSeq (protein)	NP_001155048; NP_001155049; NP_056404	NP_001032298; NP_001156905; NP_001297473; NP_083242
Location (UCSC)	Chr 14: 54.57 – 54.79 Mb	Chr 14: 47.12 – 47.34 Mb
PubMed search
- Wikidata
View/Edit Human	View/Edit Mouse

Sterile alpha motif domain containing 4A is a protein that in humans is encoded by the SAMD4A gene.

== Function ==
Sterile alpha motifs (SAMs) in proteins such as SAMD4A are part of an RNA-binding domain that functions as a posttranscriptional regulator by binding to an RNA sequence motif known as the Smaug recognition element, which was named after the Drosophila Smaug protein (Baez and Boccaccio, 2005 [PubMed 16221671]).[supplied by OMIM, Mar 2008].
