= Bax inhibitor 1 =

Protein-coding gene in humans

TMBIM6

Identifiers
- Aliases: TMBIM6, BAXI1, BI-1, TEGT, transmembrane BAX inhibitor motif containing 6
- External IDs: OMIM: 600748; MGI: 99682; GeneCards: TMBIM6

Gene location (Human)
Chr.	Chromosome 12 (human)
Band	12q13.12	Start	49,707,725 bp
Band	12q13.12	End	49,764,934 bp

Gene location (Mouse)
Chr.	Chromosome 15 (mouse)
Band	15 F1|15 56.13 cM	Start	99,290,763 bp
Band	15 F1|15 56.13 cM	End	99,307,930 bp
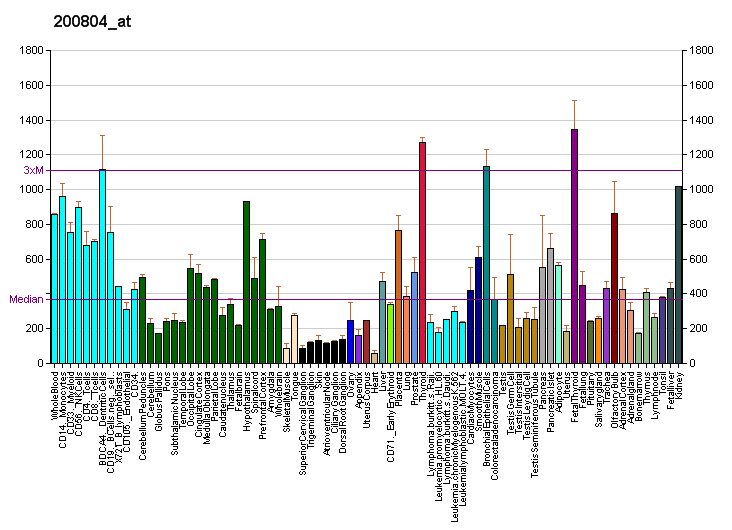

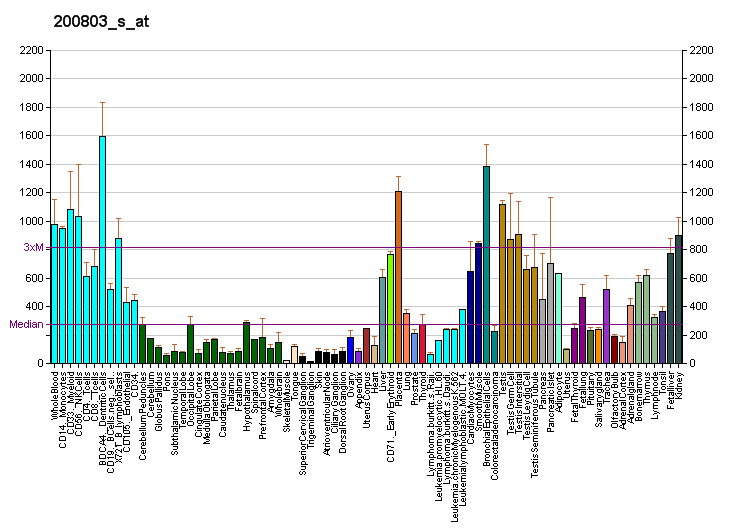
RNA expression pattern
Bgee	Human / Mouse (ortholog); Top expressed in: islet of Langerhans; renal medulla; parotid gland; right testis; left testis; ventricular zone; gallbladder; mucosa of ileum; rectum; right adrenal cortex / Top expressed in: lacrimal gland; vestibular membrane of cochlear duct; human kidney; submandibular gland; olfactory epithelium; granulocyte; epithelium of stomach; parotid gland; jejunum; intestinal villus; More reference expression data
BioGPS	More reference expression data
Gene ontology
Molecular function	endoribonuclease inhibitor activity; protein binding; enzyme binding; ubiquitin protein ligase binding
Cellular component	cytoplasm; integral component of membrane; endoplasmic reticulum membrane; membrane; mitochondrial membranes; integral component of plasma membrane; endoplasmic reticulum; nucleus
Biological process	negative regulation of endoplasmic reticulum stress-induced intrinsic apoptotic signaling pathway; negative regulation of endoribonuclease activity; negative regulation of apoptotic signaling pathway; negative regulation of apoptotic process; negative regulation of protein binding; endoplasmic reticulum calcium ion homeostasis; response to endoplasmic reticulum stress; autophagy; response to unfolded protein; intrinsic apoptotic signaling pathway in response to endoplasmic reticulum stress; response to L-glutamate; negative regulation of transcription from RNA polymerase II promoter in response to endoplasmic reticulum stress; negative regulation of hypoxia-induced intrinsic apoptotic signaling pathway; apoptotic process; negative regulation of calcium ion transport into cytosol; negative regulation of RNA splicing; Unfolded Protein Response
Sources:Amigo / QuickGO
Orthologs
Databases	NCBI: entry; OMA: entry
Species	Human	Mouse
Entrez	7009	110213
Ensembl	ENSG00000139644	ENSMUSG00000023010
UniProt	P55061	Q9D2C7
RefSeq (mRNA)	NM_001098576; NM_003217	NM_001171034; NM_001171035; NM_001171036; NM_026669
RefSeq (protein)	NP_001092046; NP_003208	NP_001164505; NP_001164506; NP_001164507; NP_080945
Location (UCSC)	Chr 12: 49.71 – 49.76 Mb	Chr 15: 99.29 – 99.31 Mb
PubMed search
- Wikidata
View/Edit Human	View/Edit Mouse

Bax inhibitor 1 (or BI-1) is a protein that in humans is encoded by the TMBIM6 gene (previously TEGT). BI-1 has multiple functions including blocking apoptosis regulator BAX binding and functioning as a calcium channel.
