= ANKS1B =

Protein-coding gene in the species Homo sapiens

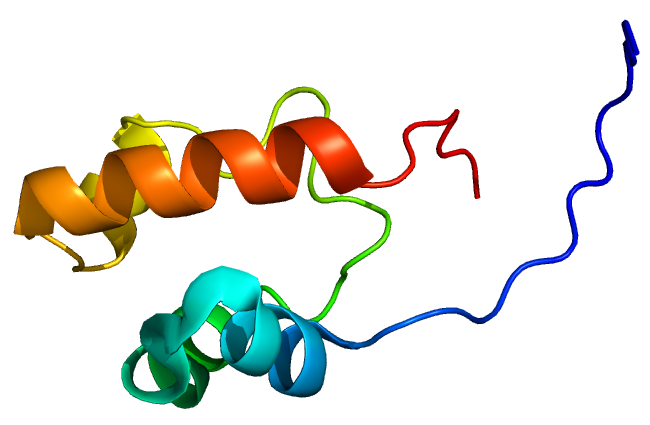

Identifiers
- Aliases: ANKS1B, AIDA, AIDA-1, ANKS2, EB-1, EB1, cajalin-2, ankyrin repeat and sterile alpha motif domain containing 1B
- External IDs: OMIM: 607815; MGI: 1924781; GeneCards: ANKS1B
Available structures
PDB	Ortholog search: PDBe RCSB
PDB	List of PDB id codes 2EAM, 2KE7, 2KIV, 2M38

Gene location (Mouse)
Chr.	Chromosome 10 (mouse)
Band	10|10 C2	Start	89,873,509 bp
Band	10|10 C2	End	90,973,300 bp
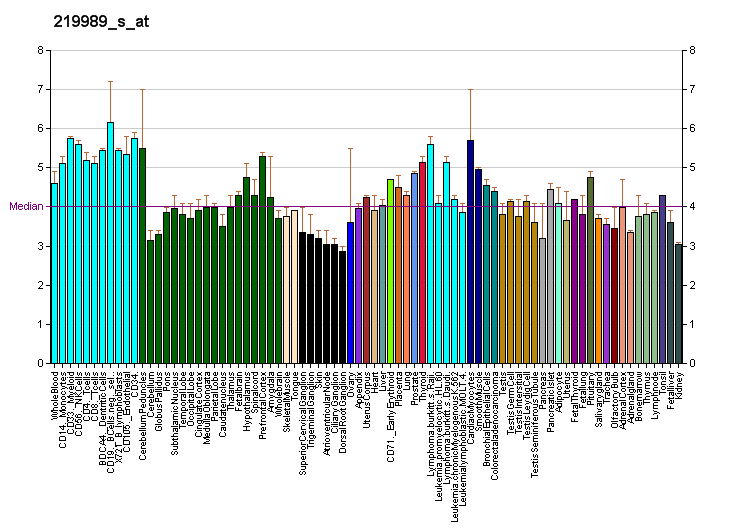
RNA expression pattern
Bgee	Human / Mouse (ortholog); n/a / Top expressed in: olfactory tubercle; medial dorsal nucleus; piriform cortex; superior frontal gyrus; nucleus accumbens; lateral septal nucleus; medial geniculate nucleus; dentate gyrus of hippocampal formation granule cell; lumbar subsegment of spinal cord; lobe of cerebellum
BioGPS	More reference expression data
Gene ontology
Molecular function	ephrin receptor binding
Cellular component	cytoplasm; cell junction; Cajal body; postsynaptic membrane; dendritic spine; cell projection; synapse; membrane; postsynaptic density; nucleus; cytosol; plasma membrane; intracellular membrane-bounded organelle
Biological process	regulation of synaptic plasticity by receptor localization to synapse
Sources:Amigo / QuickGO
Orthologs
Databases	NCBI: entry; OMA: entry
Species	Human	Mouse
Entrez	56899	77531
Ensembl	ENSG00000185046	ENSMUSG00000058589
UniProt	Q7Z6G8	Q8BIZ1
RefSeq (mRNA)	NM_001204065; NM_001204066; NM_001204067; NM_001204068; NM_001204069 NM_001204070; NM_001204079; NM_001204080; NM_001204081; NM_020140; NM_152788; NM_181670	NM_001128086; NM_001177396; NM_001177397; NM_001177398; NM_181398 NM_001347053; NM_001347054; NM_001359240; NM_001359241; NM_001359242
RefSeq (protein)	NP_001190994; NP_001190995; NP_001190996; NP_001190997; NP_001190998 NP_001190999; NP_001191008; NP_001191009; NP_001191010; NP_064525; NP_690001; NP_858056; NP_001339114; NP_001339115; NP_001339116; NP_001339117; NP_001339118; NP_001339119; NP_001339120; NP_001339121; NP_001339122; NP_001339123; NP_001339124; NP_001339125; NP_001339126; NP_001339127; NP_001339128; NP_001339129; NP_001339130; NP_001339131; NP_001339132; NP_001339133; NP_001339134; NP_001339135; NP_001339136; NP_001339137; NP_001339138; NP_001339139; NP_001339140; NP_001339141; NP_001339142; NP_001339143; NP_001339145; NP_001339146; NP_001339147; NP_001339148; NP_001339149; NP_001339150; NP_001339151; NP_001339152; NP_001339153; NP_001339154	NP_001121558; NP_001170867; NP_001170868; NP_001170869; NP_001333982 NP_001333983; NP_852063; NP_001346169; NP_001346170; NP_001346171
Location (UCSC)	n/a	Chr 10: 89.87 – 90.97 Mb
PubMed search
- Wikidata
View/Edit Human	View/Edit Mouse

Ankyrin repeat and sterile alpha motif domain-containing protein 1B is a protein that in humans is encoded by the ANKS1B gene.
