= PHC3 =

Protein-coding gene in the species Homo sapiens

Identifiers
- Aliases: PHC3, EDR3, HPH3, polyhomeotic homolog 3
- External IDs: MGI: 2181434; GeneCards: PHC3
Available structures
PDB	Ortholog search: PDBe RCSB
PDB	List of PDB id codes 4PZN, 4PZO

Gene location (Human)
Chr.	Chromosome 3 (human)
Band	3q26.2	Start	170,086,732 bp
Band	3q26.2	End	170,181,749 bp

Gene location (Mouse)
Chr.	Chromosome 3 (mouse)
Band	3|3 A3	Start	30,953,520 bp
Band	3|3 A3	End	31,023,564 bp
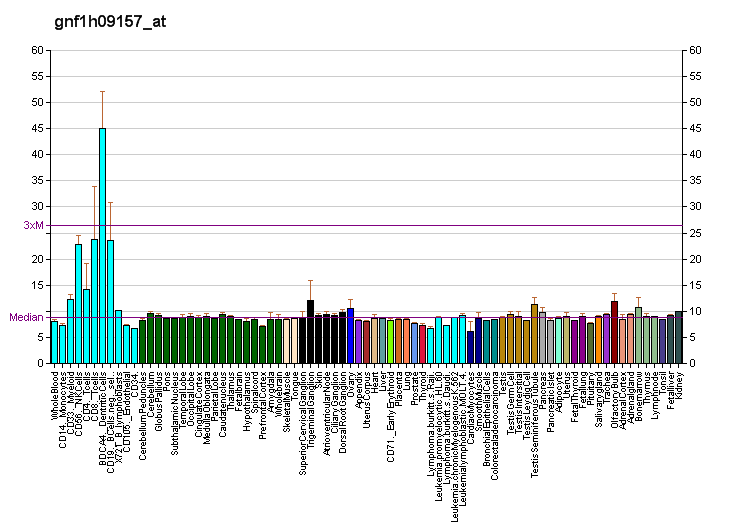

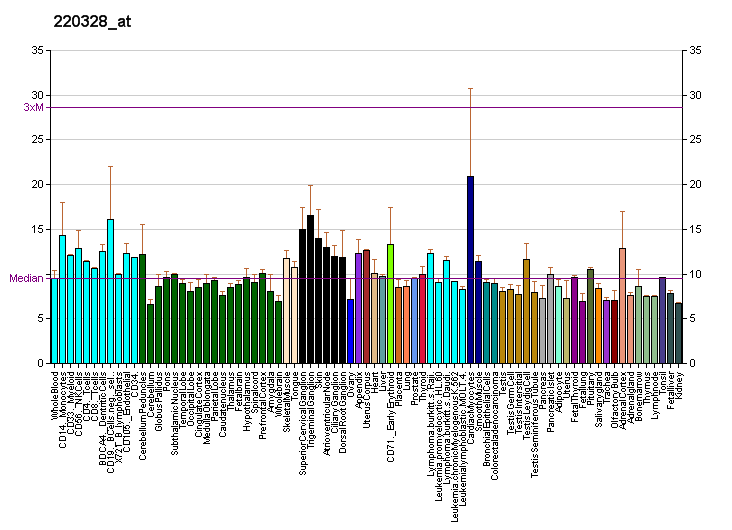
RNA expression pattern
Bgee	Human / Mouse (ortholog); Top expressed in: endothelial cell; tibia; germinal epithelium; Achilles tendon; epithelium of colon; visceral pleura; parietal pleura; superficial temporal artery; urethra; seminal vesicula / Top expressed in: otolith organ; utricle; ciliary body; prostate; lobe of prostate; iris; aortic valve; vestibular membrane of cochlear duct; retinal pigment epithelium; ascending aorta; More reference expression data
BioGPS	More reference expression data
Gene ontology
Molecular function	DNA binding; zinc ion binding; protein binding; metal ion binding
Cellular component	PcG protein complex; PRC1 complex; nucleus; nucleoplasm
Biological process	multicellular organism development; negative regulation of G0 to G1 transition
Sources:Amigo / QuickGO
Orthologs
Databases	NCBI: entry; OMA: entry
Species	Human	Mouse
Entrez	80012	241915
Ensembl	ENSG00000173889	ENSMUSG00000037652
UniProt	Q8NDX5	Q8CHP6
RefSeq (mRNA)	NM_001308116; NM_024947	NM_001165954; NM_001165955; NM_001165956; NM_153421
RefSeq (protein)	NP_001295045; NP_079223	NP_001159426; NP_001159427; NP_001159428; NP_700470
Location (UCSC)	Chr 3: 170.09 – 170.18 Mb	Chr 3: 30.95 – 31.02 Mb
PubMed search
- Wikidata
View/Edit Human	View/Edit Mouse

Polyhomeotic-like protein 3 is a protein that in humans is encoded by the PHC3 gene.
