= SCMH1 =

Protein-coding gene in humans

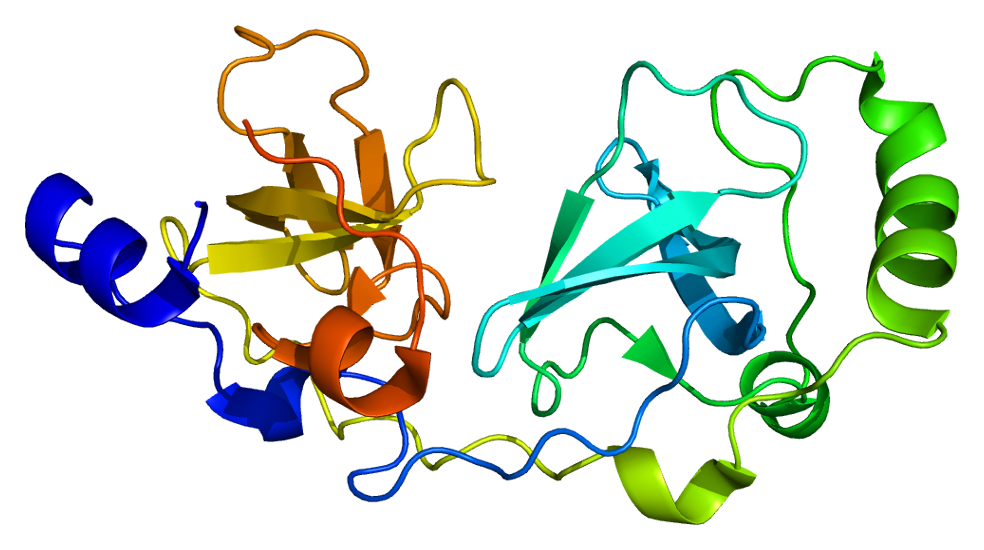

Identifiers
- Aliases: SCMH1, Scml3, sex comb on midleg homolog 1 (Drosophila), Scm polycomb group protein homolog 1
- External IDs: OMIM: 616396; MGI: 1352762; GeneCards: SCMH1
Available structures
PDB	Ortholog search: PDBe RCSB
PDB	List of PDB id codes 2P0K

Gene location (Human)
Chr.	Chromosome 1 (human)
Band	1p34.2	Start	41,027,200 bp
Band	1p34.2	End	41,242,154 bp

Gene location (Mouse)
Chr.	Chromosome 4 (mouse)
Band	4 D2.1|4 56.52 cM	Start	120,262,478 bp
Band	4 D2.1|4 56.52 cM	End	120,387,383 bp
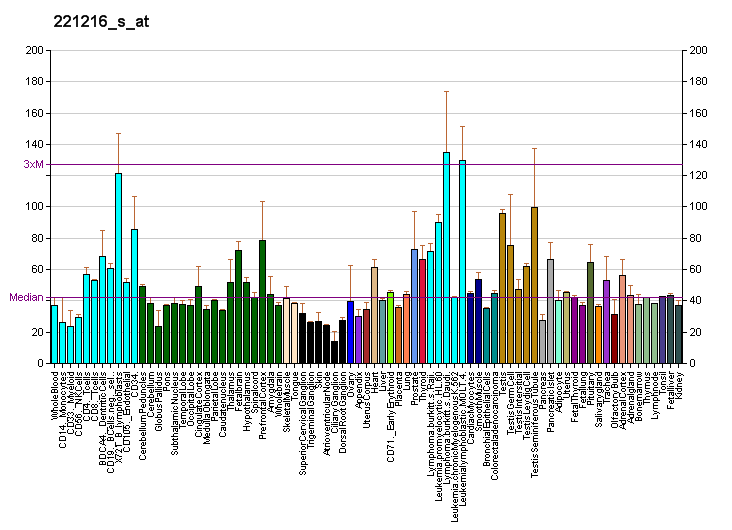
RNA expression pattern
Bgee	Human / Mouse (ortholog); Top expressed in: muscle layer of sigmoid colon; popliteal artery; tibial arteries; body of uterus; gastric mucosa; thoracic aorta; ascending aorta; Descending thoracic aorta; right coronary artery; left uterine tube / Top expressed in: saccule; Rostral migratory stream; tail of embryo; ectoderm; otic vesicle; neural layer of retina; zygote; otic placode; genital tubercle; secondary oocyte; More reference expression data
BioGPS	More reference expression data
Gene ontology
Molecular function	protein binding
Cellular component	chromocenter; nucleoplasm; nucleus
Biological process	multicellular organism development; chromatin remodeling; regulation of transcription, DNA-templated; transcription, DNA-templated; spermatogenesis; anterior/posterior pattern specification; negative regulation of transcription, DNA-templated
Sources:Amigo / QuickGO
Orthologs
Databases	NCBI: entry; OMA: entry
Species	Human	Mouse
Entrez	22955	29871
Ensembl	ENSG00000010803	ENSMUSG00000000085
UniProt	Q96GD3	Q8K214
RefSeq (mRNA)	NM_001031694; NM_001172218; NM_001172219; NM_001172220; NM_001172221 NM_001172222; NM_012236; NM_001350667; NM_001350668; NM_001394299; NM_001394300; NM_001394301; NM_001394302; NM_001394303; NM_001394304; NM_001394305; NM_001394306; NM_001394307; NM_001394308; NM_001394309; NM_001394311	NM_001159630; NM_013883; NM_001355423; NM_001355424; NM_001379184 NM_001379185; NM_001379186
RefSeq (protein)	NP_001026864; NP_001165689; NP_001165690; NP_001165691; NP_001165692 NP_001165693; NP_036368; NP_001337596; NP_001337597	NP_001153102; NP_038911; NP_001342352; NP_001342353; NP_001366113 NP_001366114; NP_001366115; NP_001391019; NP_001391031; NP_001391032
Location (UCSC)	Chr 1: 41.03 – 41.24 Mb	Chr 4: 120.26 – 120.39 Mb
PubMed search
- Wikidata
View/Edit Human	View/Edit Mouse

Polycomb protein SCMH1 is a protein that in humans is encoded by the SCMH1 gene.
