= UBP1 =

Protein-coding gene in the species Homo sapiens

Identifiers
- Aliases: UBP1, LBP-1B, LBP-1a, LBP1A, LBP1B, upstream binding protein 1 (LBP-1a), upstream binding protein 1
- External IDs: OMIM: 609784; MGI: 104889; GeneCards: UBP1

Gene location (Human)
Chr.	Chromosome 3 (human)
Band	3p22.3	Start	33,388,336 bp
Band	3p22.3	End	33,441,371 bp

Gene location (Mouse)
Chr.	Chromosome 9 (mouse)
Band	9|9 F3	Start	113,760,002 bp
Band	9|9 F3	End	113,806,270 bp
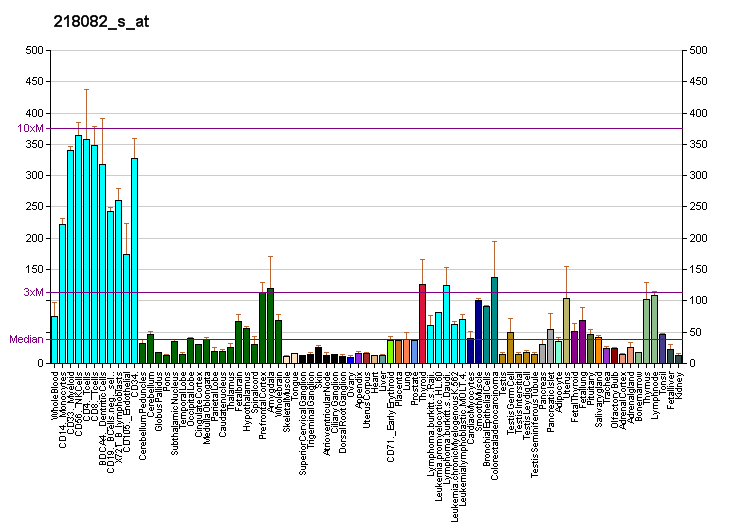
RNA expression pattern
Bgee	Human / Mouse (ortholog); Top expressed in: tibia; rectum; sural nerve; visceral pleura; popliteal artery; tibial arteries; appendix; right coronary artery; smooth muscle tissue; endothelial cell / Top expressed in: Paneth cell; medullary collecting duct; secondary oocyte; tibiofemoral joint; primary oocyte; zygote; ureter; renal corpuscle; saccule; otic vesicle; More reference expression data
BioGPS	More reference expression data
Gene ontology
Molecular function	DNA binding; transcription corepressor activity; sequence-specific DNA binding; DNA-binding transcription factor activity; DNA-binding transcription factor activity, RNA polymerase II-specific
Cellular component	nucleus; nucleoplasm; cytosol
Biological process	viral genome replication; negative regulation of transcription, DNA-templated; regulation of transcription, DNA-templated; angiogenesis; transcription, DNA-templated; regulation of transcription by RNA polymerase II
Sources:Amigo / QuickGO
Orthologs
Databases	NCBI: entry; OMA: entry
Species	Human	Mouse
Entrez	7342	22221
Ensembl	ENSG00000153560	ENSMUSG00000009741
UniProt	Q9NZI7	Q811S7
RefSeq (mRNA)	NM_001128160; NM_001128161; NM_014517	NM_001083319; NM_013699; NM_001372507; NM_001372508; NM_001372510 NM_001372511; NM_001372512; NM_001372514
RefSeq (protein)	NP_001121632; NP_001121633; NP_055332	NP_001076788; NP_038727; NP_001359436; NP_001359437; NP_001359439 NP_001359440; NP_001359441; NP_001359443
Location (UCSC)	Chr 3: 33.39 – 33.44 Mb	Chr 9: 113.76 – 113.81 Mb
PubMed search
- Wikidata
View/Edit Human	View/Edit Mouse

Upstream-binding protein 1 is a protein that in humans is encoded by the UBP1 gene.
