= SEC23IP =

Protein-coding gene in the species Homo sapiens

Identifiers
- Aliases: SEC23IP, P125, P125A, MSTP053, SEC23 interacting protein, iPLA1beta
- External IDs: OMIM: 617852; MGI: 2450915; GeneCards: SEC23IP

Gene location (Human)
Chr.	Chromosome 10 (human)
Band	10q26.11-q26.12	Start	119,892,730 bp
Band	10q26.11-q26.12	End	119,944,657 bp

Gene location (Mouse)
Chr.	Chromosome 7 (mouse)
Band	7 F3|7 70.51 cM	Start	128,346,667 bp
Band	7 F3|7 70.51 cM	End	128,386,560 bp
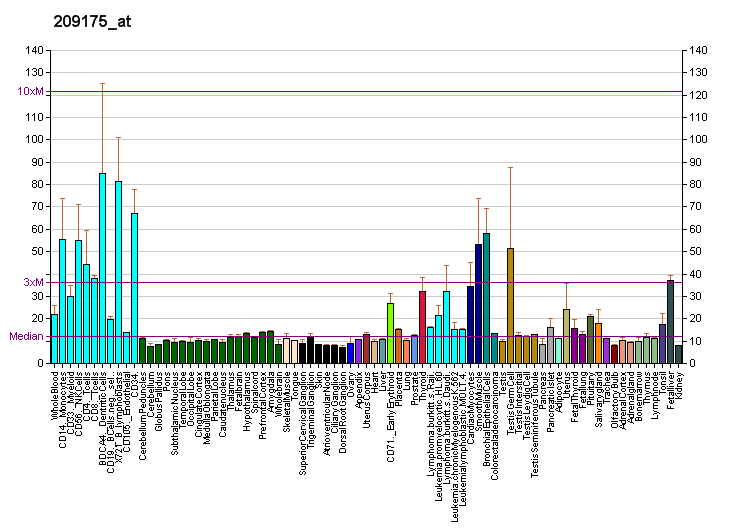

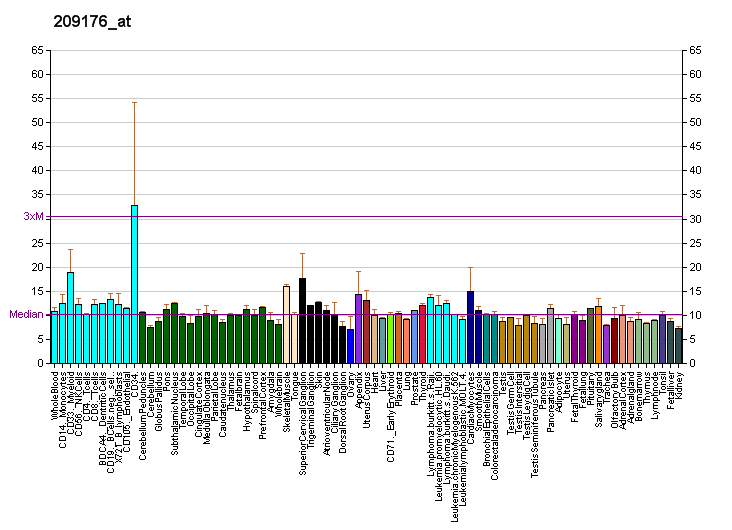

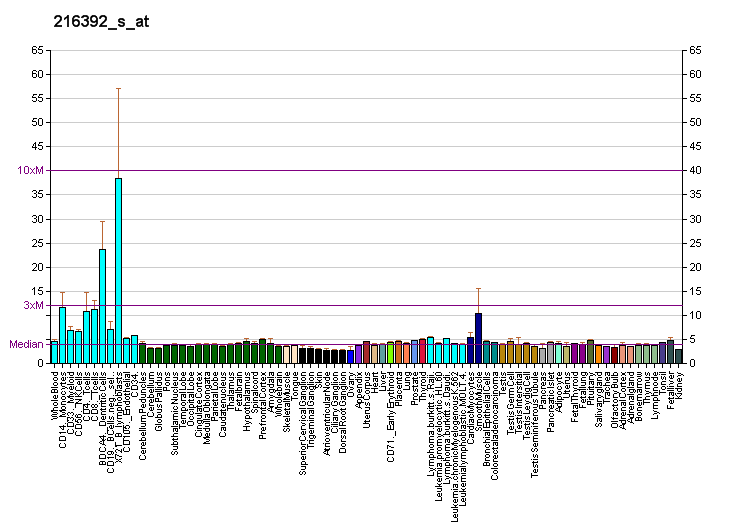
RNA expression pattern
Bgee	Human / Mouse (ortholog); Top expressed in: epithelium of colon; stromal cell of endometrium; secondary oocyte; Achilles tendon; islet of Langerhans; monocyte; smooth muscle tissue; mucosa of sigmoid colon; ventricular zone; cartilage tissue / Top expressed in: spermatid; seminiferous tubule; spermatocyte; primary oocyte; calvaria; vestibular membrane of cochlear duct; cumulus cell; yolk sac; endothelial cell of lymphatic vessel; gastrula; More reference expression data
BioGPS	More reference expression data
Gene ontology
Molecular function	protein binding; metal ion binding; phospholipase activity; RNA binding
Cellular component	cytoplasm; ER to Golgi transport vesicle membrane; cytosol; endoplasmic reticulum; membrane; cytoplasmic vesicle; endoplasmic reticulum-Golgi intermediate compartment; Golgi membrane; COPII-coated ER to Golgi transport vesicle; Golgi apparatus; intracellular membrane-bounded organelle
Biological process	COPII vesicle coating; intracellular protein transport; Golgi organization; endoplasmic reticulum to Golgi vesicle-mediated transport
Sources:Amigo / QuickGO
Orthologs
Databases	NCBI: entry; OMA: entry
Species	Human	Mouse
Entrez	11196	207352
Ensembl	ENSG00000107651	ENSMUSG00000055319
UniProt	Q9Y6Y8	Q6NZC7
RefSeq (mRNA)	NM_007190	NM_001029982
RefSeq (protein)	NP_009121	n/a
Location (UCSC)	Chr 10: 119.89 – 119.94 Mb	Chr 7: 128.35 – 128.39 Mb
PubMed search
- Wikidata
View/Edit Human	View/Edit Mouse

SEC23-interacting protein is a protein that in humans is encoded by the SEC23IP gene.

COPII-coated vesicles are involved in protein transport from the Endoplasmic Reticulum to the Golgi Apparatus. The protein encoded by this gene was identified by its interaction with a mouse protein similar to yeast Sec23p, an essential component of the COPII. This protein shares significant similarity with phospholipid-modifying proteins, especially phosphatidic acid preferring-phospholipase A1. Overexpression of this protein has been shown to cause disorganization of the endoplasmic reticulum-Golgi intermediate compartment and Golgi apparatus, which suggests its role in the early secretory pathway.
