= Vasculogenic mimicry =

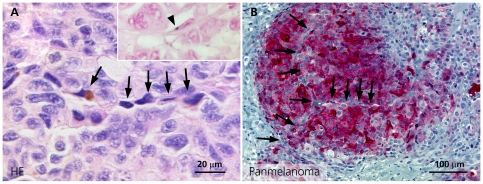
Vascular mimicries (indicated by arrows) in melanoma A) H&E stain B) PanMelanoma cocktail stain.

Vasculogenic mimicry (VM) is a strategy used by tumors to ensure sufficient blood supply is brought to its cells through establishing new tumor vascularization. This process is similar to tumor angiogenesis; on the other hand vascular mimicry is unique in that this process occurs independent of endothelial cells. Vasculature is instead developed de novo by cancer cells, which under stress conditions such as hypoxia, express similar properties to stem cells, capable of differentiating to mimic the function of endothelial cells and form vasculature-like structures. The ability of tumors to develop and harness nearby vasculature is considered one of the hallmarks of cancer disease development and is thought to be closely linked to tumor invasion and metastasis. Vascular mimicry has been observed predominantly in aggressive and metastatic cancers and has been associated with negative tumor characteristics such as increased metastasis, increased tissue invasion, and overall poor outcomes for patient survival. Vascular mimicry poses a serious problem for current therapeutic strategies due to its ability to function in the presence of Anti-angiogenic therapeutic agents. In fact, such therapeutics have been found to actually drive VM formation in tumors, causing more aggressive and difficult to treat tumors to develop.

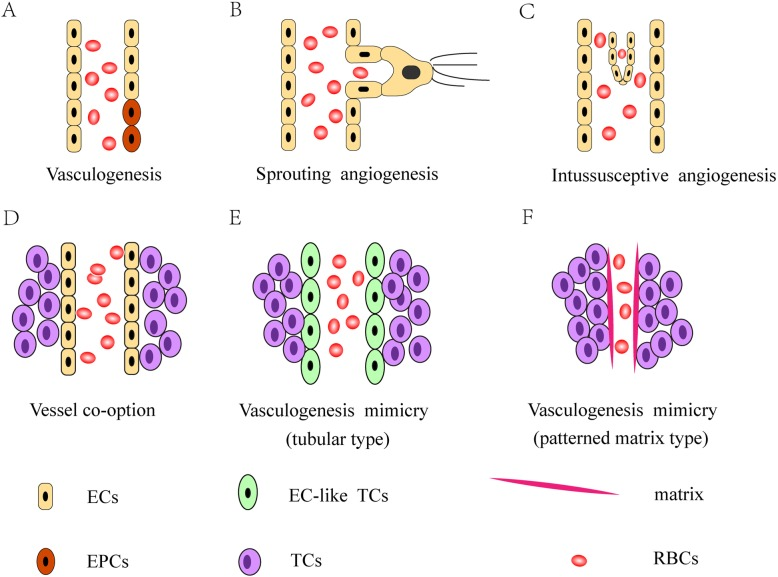
The structure of tumor blood vessels formed through the known tumor angiogenesis pathways. Vasculogenesis, sprouting angiogenesis, Intussusceptive angiogenesis, vessel co-option, and both vascular mimicry tubular and patterned matrix types are shown.

== Overview ==
Vascular mimicry was first discovered in 1999 by Maniotis et al. who identified blood supplying channels in melanoma that were composed entirely of tumor cell based structures. They found that cancer cells had taken on endothelial cell properties and were forming blood conducting vessels independent of normal angiogenesis pathways. This finding spurred interest within the research community to discover the cause of this pathway and its relevance to disease.

Researchers have since discovered that VM is closely linked to several signaling pathways including vascular signaling, embryogenesis, and the hypoxic response.

=== Requirements for VM formation ===
In order for new vasculature to form through VM, several requirements must be met. These generally include aberrant expression of VE-cadherin, as well as changes to the density and composition of the extracellular matrix. VE-cadherin is a transmembrane protein that is specifically expressed in endothelial cells to promote and maintain specific adhesion of endothelial cells critical to vascularization. However, aggressive and metastatic cancers have been found to have aberrant expression of VE-cadherin, allowing for formation of cancer cell specific vasculature. VE-cadherin also regulates inter-cellular signaling pathways which promote invasion of cancer cells into nearby and distal tissues, a major component of metastatic disease. VE-cadherin has also been linked to regulatory functions in cell proliferation, cell death, and the expression and function of VEGFRs.

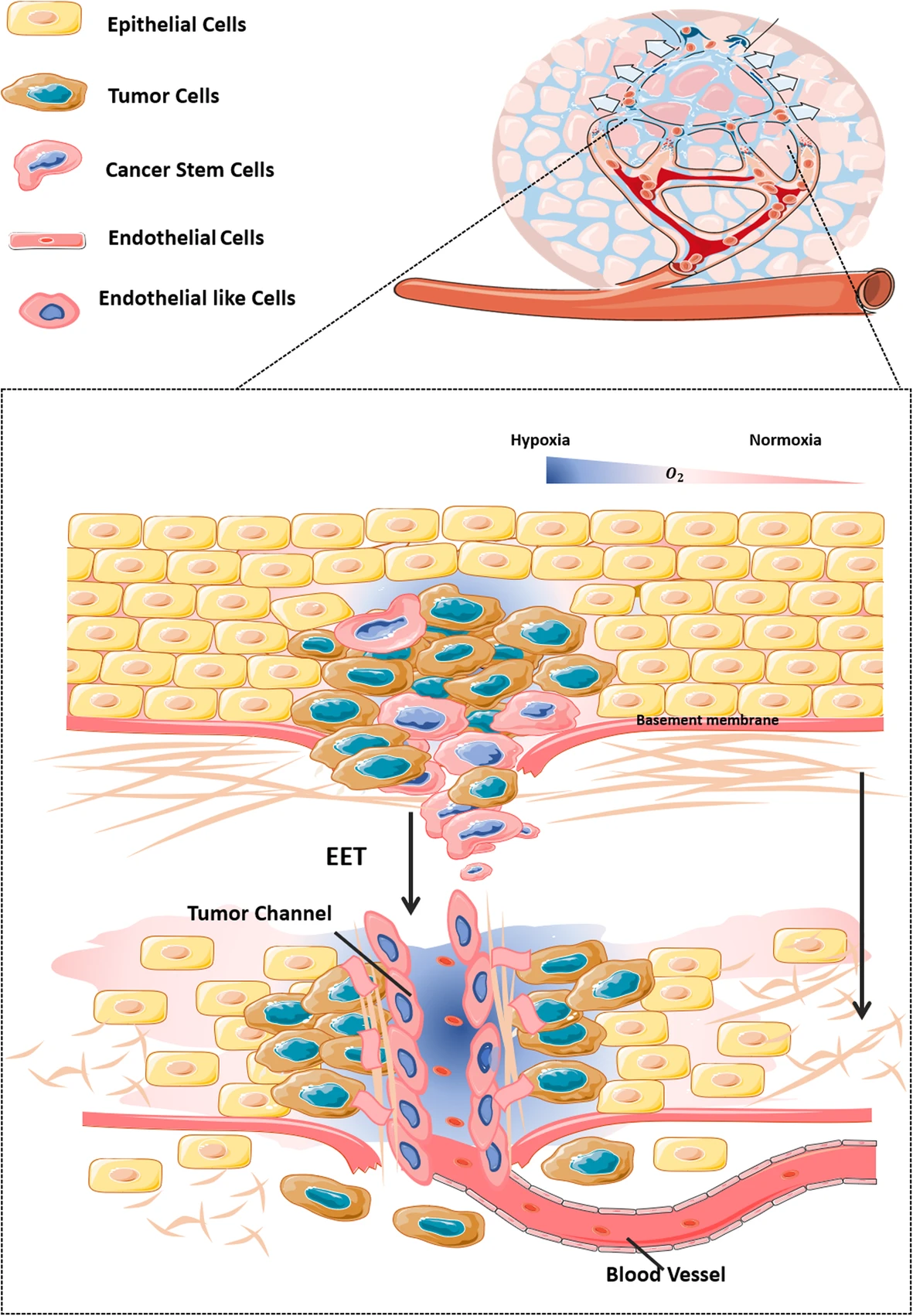
Visual representation of vascular mimicry formation under hypoxic conditions. EET (A subtype of EMT) drives cancer cells to take on endothelial-like properties to form vasculature.

Another major factor in the formation of VM in tumors is the adjustment of the extracellular matrix to promote vasculature formation. Aggressive tumors express elevated levels of proteins such as matrix metalloproteinases (MMPs), laminin5y2, and type-1 & 4 collagens. These glycoproteins secreted are into the ECM by cancer cells and act to clear space for new vessel formation, as well as promote recruitment and reorganization of cancer cells to form new blood conducting vessels.

== Identification and classification ==
Clinically, VM is diagnosed through immunohistochemistry (IHC) and Periodic acid-Schiff stain (PAS) of patient tumor biopsy. IHC staining identifies the expression of common biomarkers of endothelial cells such as CD31, while PAS staining marks the extracellular matrix for glycoproteins, laminin, proteoglycans, heparin sulfate and collagens, which are known to be a sign of VM. Clinicians diagnose a tumor as having VM by CD31-/PAS+ expressing blood conducting vessels, indicating that there are no endothelial cells but still vasculature present.

Vascular mimicry may be divided into tubular and patterned matrix types. Tubular VM is characterized by channels surrounded by glycoprotein covered tumor cells where endothelial cells would normally sit. Patterned matrix type VM lacks the endothelial-like tumor cells and is instead tumor cells that are enveloped by PAS+ matrix/

== Mechanisms and pathways ==
=== Epithelial-mesenchymal transition (EMT) ===
EMT is thought to be one of the major drivers of VM in cancer. This is a mechanism through which cancer cells lose their epithelial properties resulting in a loss of cell-cell adhesion and a transition towards mesenchymal-like properties . EMT plays a diverse and essential role in adhesion, motility and morphology of cells under both normal and pathological conditions. When cells undergo EMT, they lose their polarity, ability to adhere to neighboring cells, and the tight contacts as result of losing expression of epithelial cell markers such as E-cadherin. Cells that have taken on mesenchymal properties are non-adherent, and thus promote invasion into nearby tissues. This process occurs normally in wound healing as well as embryonic development. This transition process has been identified to occur in cancer cells and drives metastasis and invasion into other tissues. EMT is associated with increasing and maintaining the VM in tumors through several pathways such as Twist transcription factor, and TGFB. Importantly to VM, the process of EMT results in the loss of E-cadherin, and the promotion of VE-cadherin transcription and expression, a critical factor in development of vascular mimicry. EMT is also implicated in promotion of stem-like properties in cancer cells.

=== Cancer stem cell signaling (CSCs) ===
Cancer stem cells (CSCs) is a theory which explains the heterogeneity of tumors. This theory states that tumors arise from a small subpopulation of cancer cells which have the ability to self-renew as well as differentiate. These CSCs give rise to unique cell subpopulations within the tumor through differentiation, which express unique cell characteristics that further drive tumor growth and metastasis. CSCs have been linked to driving VM formation predominantly through the secretion of VEGF, which is a well established regulator of VE-cadherin expression. Within the CSCs, several studies have identified specific subtypes of cancer stem cells which are linked to promoting VM formation, including stem cells expressing CD133+ in acute leukemia, melanoma, and Triple negative breast cancer (TNBC).

Further, the Notch and Nodal signaling pathways, both a part of the transforming growth factor β (TGF-β) protein superfamily that functions to reserve undifferentiated stem cells during early development to allow for future development, have been positively associated with VM formation. Under physiological conditions, Nodal is rarely expressed in adult tissues. This changes however in cancer cells, where Nodal is significantly upregulated in numerous aggressive cancers. Nodal signaling occurs unchecked in cancers through binding of activin-like kinase receptors ALK and signals downstream transcription associated with increased cell plasticity, an essential factor in VM formation. Notch function remains active in adult tissues and is an essential signaling pathway in stem cell differentiation, including the formation of vasculature. Notch modulates Nodal activation during embryonic stages during the establishment of positionality of specific cells in the embryo. This process is reactivated in cancers such as melanoma and has been shown to drive cancers cells to possess increased plasticity as well as overall cancer aggressiveness. Specifically, increased Notch-4 expression was found across multiple aggressive melanoma cell lines, and the inhibition of Notch4 activity in melanoma was sufficient to prevent VM formation.

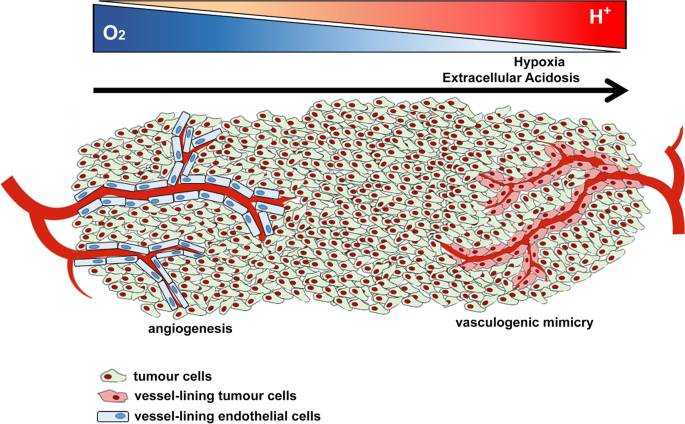
The transition of tumors from angiogenesis to vascular mimicry under hypoxic conditions

=== Hypoxia and tumor microenvironment ===
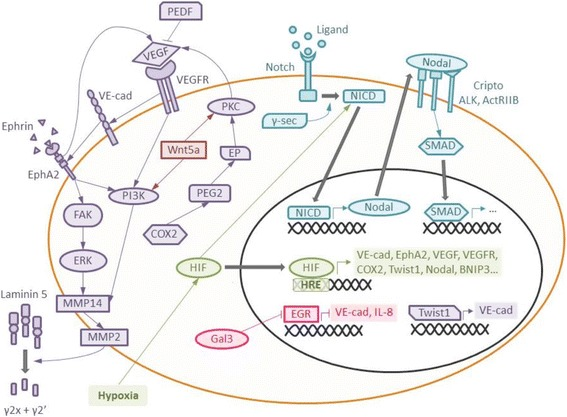
The major signaling pathways involved in vasculogenic mimicry. Vascular signaling (purple), Stem cell signaling (blue), and Hypoxia (green) are the major pathways shown.

Another major mechanism through which vasculogenic mimicry is induced is hypoxia. Hypoxia is very common in tumors due to insufficient vasculature to provide oxygen for the rapidly proliferating tumor issues within what is known as the tumor microenvironment. To circumvent this problem, tumors utilize a diverse set of pathways to promote various angiogenesis strategies as well as vasculogenic mimicry. Hypoxia inducible factors (HIFs) are transcription factors which are able to remain functional during hypoxic conditions, bind to hypoxia responsive elements (HRE) on the genome. Gene targets with HRE sites bind HIF and mediate gene transcription. The location of HRE sites on the genome varies among cancer cell types, however hypoxia based signaling has been found to activate VM related genes including VE-cadherin, COX-2, Twist, Nodal, EphA2, VEGF-A, and VEGR-1. Hypoxia can also promote VM through other signaling pathways such as NF-κB, which upregulates Twist expression, an inducer of VM. Many chemotherapeutic agents used in the treatment of cancers intentionally drive hypoxia in tumors as a treatment strategy by inhibiting tumor angiogenesis. While these treatments vary in efficacy depending on cancer type and patient, it has been shown that such therapies may actually drive tumors down more aggressive routes through the promotion of VM based tumor survival.

=== Major observed signaling pathways significant to VM formation or maintenance ===
Major signalling pathways involved in VM
Name	Classification	Role in VM
EphA2	Ephrin tyrosine kinase	Highly expressed in malignant tumors, EphA2 thought to bind PI3K and increase VE-cadherin expression.
VEGFR-1 & 2	vascular endothelial growth factor receptor	Both receptors signaling pathways have been linked to VM. VEGFR-1 drives VM formation through activation of PI3K pathway in melanoma, while VEGFR-2 has been determined to drive VM in glioblastoma.
Notch/Nodal	TGF-β protein superfamily	Important to maintaining CSCs population responsible for VM, as well as increasing MMP-2 expression through activation of VEGFR-1 pathway.
MMPs	Matrix metalloproteinases	High expression considered a requirement for VM formation, functions as a proteolytic enzyme thought to interact with laminin to promote VM blood vessel formation. Further, MMPs have a major role in degradation and reshaping of the extracellular matrix (ECM) and basement membrane, a process critical to provide space for new VM to form.
HIF1-A	Hypoxia inducible factor	Expressed under hypoxic conditions. Binds to HER sites in the genome, several activated genes have been linked to VM formation.
twist	transcription factor	Important roles in VM including downregulation of E-Cadherin, upregulation of VE-cadherin expression, and driving EMT in tumor cells,
COX-2	isozyme	Established as a driver of VM in breast cancer. High expression of COX-2 was associated with increased cancer cell stemness, driving of VM through PI3K/AKT pathways, and modulating NOTCH and WNT expression.
non-coding RNAs	Ribonucleic acid (Not translated)	Multiple ncRNAs have been linked to VM formation. miRNA-193b expression regulates VM by inhibition of DDAH1, resulting in suppression of VM. miR-93 increases VM formation in TNBC, overexpression of miR-93 has been found to increase vascularization of the tumor.

== Cancer ==
Vascular mimicry has been noted in numerous cancers has been consistently associated with poor patient survival outcomes. Meta-analysis of over 3000 patients across 15 different cancers found that the 5-year survival of patients with VM positive tumors was 31%, while patients with VM negative tumors had a significantly better 5-year survival rate of 56%. Further, this difference in outcome is greater when looking at later stage disease. VM is also a significant factor in the development of tumor resistance to Anti-angiogenic chemotherapeutic strategies.

=== Breast cancer ===
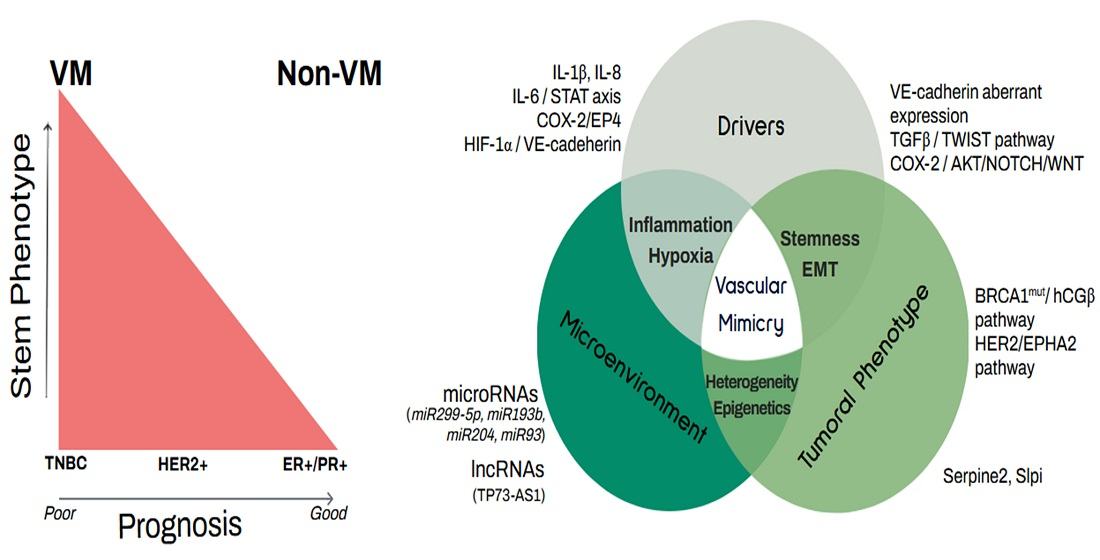
Left: the relationship between breast cancer cell stemness, vasculogenic mimicry, and prognosis. Right: provides a diagram of factors involved in formation of vascular mimicry in breast cancer.

New strategies to overcome treatment resistance in breast cancers have looked to target tumor angiogenesis and the problem posed by vascular mimicry in treatment resistance. The presence of VM in breast cancer has been associated with the more challenging to treat triple negative breast cancer (TNBC). In addition, VM has been found to be more predominant in HER2 positive breast cancer, increase the presence of Epithelial-mesenchymal transition markers, and increased stem-like properties of breast cancer cells. In a study of malignant breast cancers, 35% of reported cases of TNBC were found to be VM+, while only 17.8% of non-TNBC were found to be VM+.

=== Glioblastoma ===
Glioblastoma is characterized by hypervascularization, thus therapeutic strategies targeting tumor angiogenesis are often used clinically. Vascular mimicry provides tumors with a strategy to resist anti-angiogenic therapies, which have been shown to actually increase VM formation in patients due to the hypoxia these treatments induce.

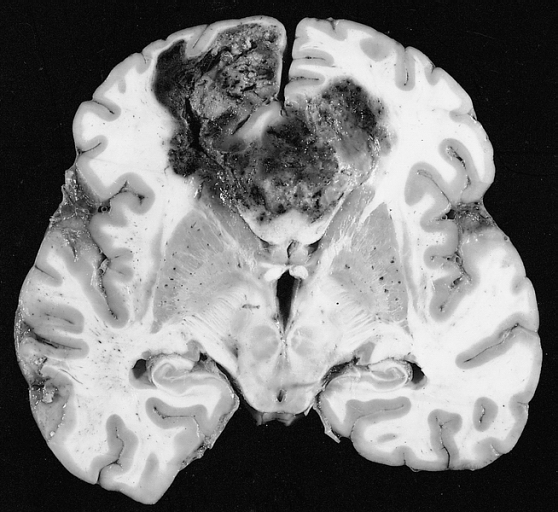
Glioblastoma

=== Melanoma ===
Melanoma is an aggressive skin cancer which has been shown to utilize both angiogenesis and vascular mimicry to drive metastasis and also increase treatment resistance. Metastatic melanoma has very poor survival outcomes with a median survival of 6 months. VM has been identified to be present only in metastatic and very aggressive melanomas. Major biomarkers of VM in melanoma include: VEGF-A, HIF-1A, and Nodal.

=== Urological tumors ===
This includes cancers of the urinary system such as prostate cancer, and clear renal cell carcinomas.

==== Prostate cancer ====
Prostate cancer is cancer of the male reproductive organ and represents one of the most common solid tumor cancers in men. Metastatic prostate cancer is currently treated using androgen deprivation therapy, however post 18 months, metastatic prostate cancer develops resistance to therapy. Prostate cancer with VM has been shown to occur in patients with overall more aggressive disease including higher Gleason scores, and more metastatic and lymph node formation. Biomarkers of VM in prostate cancer include: HIF1α, ZEB1, EphA2, and Sp1.

==== Renal cell carcinoma ====
Renal cell carcinoma (RCC) is cancer of the kidneys with a 5-year survival rate for early detection of 92.6%. Only 75% of patients with RCC are detected during early stages leaving 25% diagnosed as more aggressive metastatic stages of tumor development. RCC relies upon angiogenesis to develop, thus the use of the anti-angiogenic drug Sunitinib have been used to great effect. The use of Sunitinib has promising effects on restricting tumor growth, however this effect is diminished after several months of treatment. Retrospective studies of RCC reveal that VM+ patients have significantly decreased rates of disease-free survival when compared to VM- patients. Further, VM+ patients had a significantly higher risk for cancer recurrence. Biomarkers of VM in RCC include: MMPs, Vimentin, low PRRX1 expression, CIP2A, and ncRNAs.

=== Ovarian cancer ===
Ovarian cancer has a standard treatment strategy of carboplatin and paclitaxel that has a positive effect in 80% of patients. Despite a strong initial response to chemotherapy, the majority of these patients will see disease recurrence as well as develop resistance to available chemotherapeutic strategies. The use of Anti-angiogenic compounds in ovarian cancer has met with limited success largely due to the availability of VM signaling pathways in aggressive tumors. Due to poor strategies for early detection, ovarian cancer is generally caught at later stages of disease and thus difficult to treat. VM is a major alternative vascularization pathway in ovarian cancer that is currently poorly understood in the ovarian cancer context. Major markers of VM in ovarian cancers include: VE-cadherin, VEGF-A, CD147, uPA, Twist1, hypoxia related factors, and CSC markers such as ALDH and CD133.

== Therapeutics ==
While there are few drugs currently developed that specifically target vascular mimicry, there are compounds in development to inhibit VM, as well as numerous researched compounds which have shown effective VM inhibition in animal and cell culture models.

(* Indicates the compound has FDA approval, NOTE: Not approved for specific use in treatment of VM)

Known compounds which inhibit VM
Name	Drug target	Cancer type tested in
PARP inhibition	VE-cadherin	Melanoma
*Rapamycin	mTOR/VEGF	Ovarian cancer, Gliomas
Isoxanthohumol	TGF-β signalling	Breast Cancer
Resveratrol	VEGF-R1 & R2	Melanoma
Ginsenoside Rg3	VE-cadherin, MMPs, EphA2	Pancreatic cancer
Brucine	EMT transition, MMP-2 and MMP-9 inhibition	Triple negative breast cancer
R8 modified epirubicin-dihydroartemisinin liposomes	VE-cadherin, TGF-β signalling, MMP-2, HIF-1	Non-small cell lung cancer
Chrysin	SPHK/HIF-1α	Prostate Cancer
*Sorafenib	VEGFR-2	Metastatic renal cell carcinoma
*Panobinostat	HDAC/hypoxia	Multiple myeloma
*Copanlisib	PI3K	Follicular lymphoma

== See also ==
- Angiogenesis
- Hypoxia
