= EPH receptor B1 =

Protein-coding gene in the species Homo sapiens

EPHB1
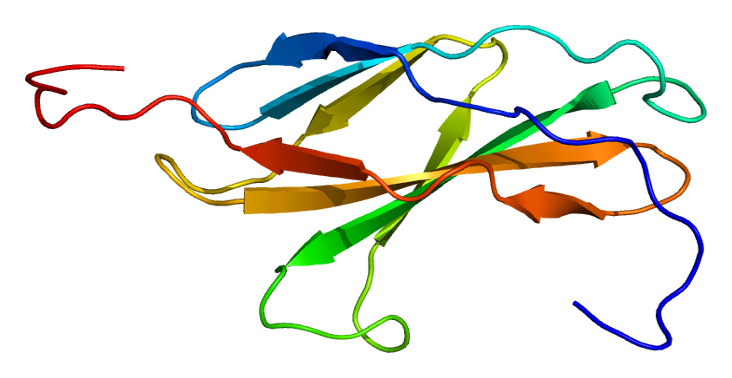

Identifiers
- Aliases: EPHB1, Ephb1, 9330129L11, AW488255, C130099E04Rik, Cek6, ENSMUSG00000074119, Elk, Elkh, Hek6, Net, EPHT2, EPH receptor B1, ELK, NET
- External IDs: OMIM: 600600; MGI: 1096337; GeneCards: EPHB1
Available structures
PDB	Ortholog search: PDBe RCSB
PDB	List of PDB id codes 2DJS, 2EAO, 3ZFX
Enzyme activity
EC #	BRENDA	ExPASy	KEGG	MetaCyc
2.7.10.1	↗	↗	↗	↗

Gene location (Human)
Chr.	Chromosome 3 (human)
Band	3q22.2	Start	134,795,260 bp
Band	3q22.2	End	135,260,467 bp

Gene location (Mouse)
Chr.	Chromosome 9 (mouse)
Band	9|9 F1	Start	101,799,327 bp
Band	9|9 F1	End	102,231,892 bp
RNA expression pattern
Bgee	Human / Mouse (ortholog); Top expressed in: endothelial cell; ganglionic eminence; Brodmann area 23; secondary oocyte; cerebellum; cerebellar cortex; ventricular zone; cerebellar hemisphere; primary visual cortex; right hemisphere of cerebellum / Top expressed in: otic vesicle; lumbar subsegment of spinal cord; otolith organ; utricle; inferior colliculi; substantia nigra; deep cerebellar nuclei; superior colliculus; Rostral migratory stream; medial ganglionic eminence; More reference expression data
BioGPS	n/a
Gene ontology
Molecular function	transferase activity; nucleotide binding; protein kinase activity; kinase activity; protein binding; transmembrane receptor protein tyrosine kinase activity; protein tyrosine kinase activity; ATP binding; ephrin receptor activity; axon guidance receptor activity; transmembrane-ephrin receptor activity; protein-containing complex binding
Cellular component	integral component of membrane; endosome; cell projection; early endosome membrane; membrane; integral component of plasma membrane; extracellular region; dendrite; extracellular exosome; endoplasmic reticulum; cytosol; plasma membrane; axon; cytoplasm; filopodium tip; membrane raft; neuron projection; receptor complex; glutamatergic synapse
Biological process	phosphorylation; transmembrane receptor protein tyrosine kinase signaling pathway; nervous system development; dendritic spine development; cell-substrate adhesion; regulation of JNK cascade; protein phosphorylation; cell adhesion; regulation of neuron death; regulation of ERK1 and ERK2 cascade; protein autophosphorylation; peptidyl-tyrosine phosphorylation; immunological synapse formation; axon guidance; optic nerve morphogenesis; central nervous system projection neuron axonogenesis; retinal ganglion cell axon guidance; ephrin receptor signaling pathway; camera-type eye morphogenesis; positive regulation of synapse assembly; dendritic spine morphogenesis; angiogenesis; skeletal muscle satellite cell activation; cranial nerve development; neurogenesis; establishment of cell polarity; detection of temperature stimulus involved in sensory perception of pain; cell chemotaxis; neural precursor cell proliferation; negative regulation of skeletal muscle satellite cell proliferation; negative regulation of satellite cell differentiation; modulation of chemical synaptic transmission
Sources:Amigo / QuickGO
Orthologs
Databases	NCBI: entry; OMA: entry
Species	Human	Mouse
Entrez	2047	270190
Ensembl	ENSG00000154928	ENSMUSG00000032537
UniProt	P54762	Q8CBF3
RefSeq (mRNA)	NM_004441	NM_001168296; NM_173447
RefSeq (protein)	NP_004432	NP_001161768; NP_775623
Location (UCSC)	Chr 3: 134.8 – 135.26 Mb	Chr 9: 101.8 – 102.23 Mb
PubMed search
- Wikidata
View/Edit Human	View/Edit Mouse

Ephrin type-B receptor 1 is a protein that in humans is encoded by the EPHB1 gene.

== Function ==
Ephrin receptors and their ligands, the ephrins, mediate numerous developmental processes, particularly in the nervous system. Based on their structures and sequence relationships, ephrins are divided into the ephrin-A (EFNA) class, which are anchored to the membrane by a glycosylphosphatidylinositol linkage, and the ephrin-B (EFNB) class, which are transmembrane proteins. The Eph family of receptors are divided into 2 groups based on the similarity of their extracellular domain sequences and their affinities for binding ephrin-A and ephrin-B ligands. Ephrin receptors make up the largest subgroup of the receptor tyrosine kinase (RTK) family. The protein encoded by this gene is a receptor for ephrin-B family members.

== Interactions ==
EPH receptor B1 has been shown to interact with:

- ACP1
- GRB7 and
- NCK1
- Ephrin-B2
