= SGMS1 =

Protein-coding gene in the species Homo sapiens

Identifiers
- Aliases: SGMS1, MOB, MOB1, SMS1, TMEM23, hmob33, sphingomyelin synthase 1
- External IDs: OMIM: 611573; MGI: 2444110; GeneCards: SGMS1
Available structures
| PDB | Ortholog search: PDBe RCSB |
| PDB | List of PDB id codes 2D8C |
Enzyme activity
| EC # | BRENDA | ExPASy | KEGG | MetaCyc |
|---|---|---|---|---|
| 2.7.8.27 | ↗ | ↗ | ↗ | ↗ |

Gene location (Human)
| Chr. | Chromosome 10 (human) |
| Band | 10q11.23 | Start | 50,305,586 bp |
| Band | 10q11.23 | End | 50,625,163 bp |

Gene location (Mouse)
| Chr. | Chromosome 19 (mouse) |
| Band | 19|19 C1 | Start | 32,122,727 bp |
| Band | 19|19 C1 | End | 32,389,714 bp |
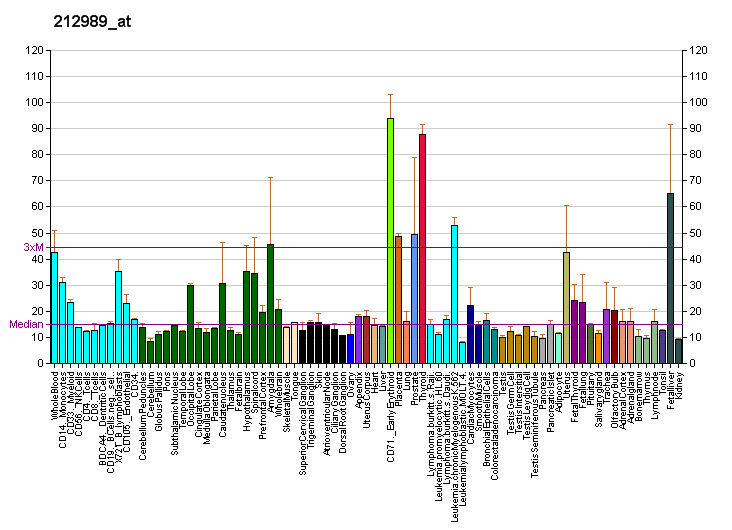
RNA expression pattern
| Bgee | Human / Mouse (ortholog); Top expressed in: Achilles tendon; palpebral conjunctiva; retinal pigment epithelium; Epithelium of choroid plexus; germinal epithelium; corpus callosum; hair follicle; skin of thigh; C1 segment; skin of hip / Top expressed in: spermatid; seminiferous tubule; retinal pigment epithelium; Epithelium of choroid plexus; sciatic nerve; left lung lobe; interventricular septum; vestibular membrane of cochlear duct; right lung lobe; spermatocyte; More reference expression data |
| BioGPS | More reference expression data |
Gene ontology
| Molecular function | kinase activity; transferase activity; ceramide cholinephosphotransferase activity; sphingomyelin synthase activity; ceramide phosphoethanolamine synthase activity |
| Cellular component | integral component of membrane; integral component of Golgi membrane; Golgi trans cisterna; Golgi membrane; plasma membrane; Golgi apparatus; endoplasmic reticulum; nucleus; membrane; integral component of plasma membrane; integral component of endoplasmic reticulum membrane |
| Biological process | lipid metabolism; sphingomyelin biosynthetic process; sphingolipid biosynthetic process; phosphorylation; apoptotic process; sphingolipid metabolic process; ceramide biosynthetic process; regulation of intrinsic apoptotic signaling pathway; inflammatory response; positive regulation of gene expression; cellular response to lipopolysaccharide; cellular response to tumor necrosis factor |
Sources:Amigo / QuickGO
Orthologs
| Databases | NCBI: entry; OMA: entry |
| Species | Human | Mouse |
| Entrez | 259230 | 208449 |
| Ensembl | ENSG00000198964 | ENSMUSG00000040451 |
| UniProt | Q86VZ5 | Q8VCQ6 |
| RefSeq (mRNA) | NM_147156 | NM_001168525; NM_001168526; NM_144792; NM_001362423 |
| RefSeq (protein) | NP_671512 | NP_001161997; NP_001161998; NP_659041; NP_001349352 |
| Location (UCSC) | Chr 10: 50.31 – 50.63 Mb | Chr 19: 32.12 – 32.39 Mb |
| PubMed search |
- Wikidata
| View/Edit Human | View/Edit Mouse |

Phosphatidylcholine:ceramide cholinephosphotransferase 1 is an enzyme that in humans is encoded by the SGMS1 gene.

== Function ==
The protein encoded by this gene is predicted to be a five-pass transmembrane protein. This gene may be predominately expressed in brain.
