= Nanos 3′ UTR translation control element =

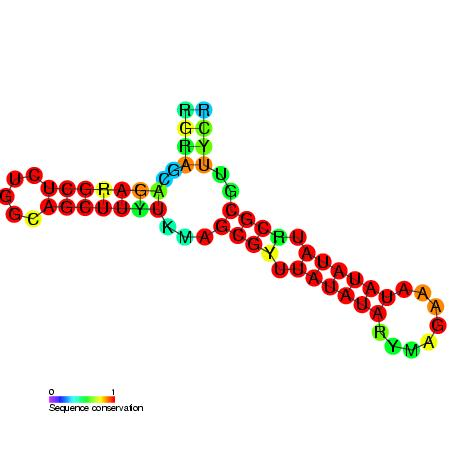
- Predicted secondary structure and sequence conservation of nos_TCE

Identifiers
- Symbol: nos_TCE
- Rfam: RF00161

Other data
- RNA type: Cis-reg
- Domain(s): Eukaryota
- GO: GO:0008595 GO:0017148 GO:0005515
- SO: SO:0000205
- PDB structures: PDBe

Nanos 3′ UTR translation control element is a cis-regulatory element in the 3′ untranslated region (3′ UTR) of the messenger RNA which encodes the Nanos protein. The Nanos protein in Drosophila is required for correct morphogenesis (anterior/posterior patterning) in the Drosophila embryo. Translation of the Nanos mRNA is repressed in the bulk cytoplasm and activated in the posterior region. The translation control element (TCE) in the 3'UTR forms a Y-shaped secondary structure, part of which is recognised by the Smaug protein and leads to translational repression.
