= EPH receptor A2 =

Protein found in humans

EPHA2
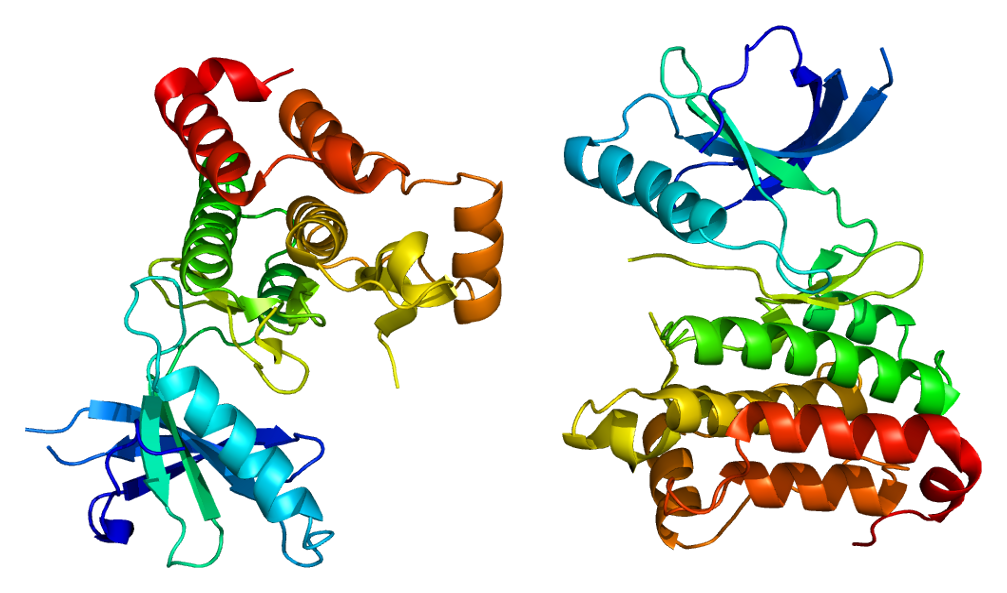

Identifiers
- Aliases: EPHA2, Epha2, AW545284, Eck, Myk2, Sek-2, Sek2, ARCC2, CTPA, CTPP1, CTRCT6, EPH receptor A2, ECK
- External IDs: OMIM: 176946; MGI: 95278; GeneCards: EPHA2
Available structures
PDB	Ortholog search: PDBe RCSB
PDB	List of PDB id codes 1MQB, 2E8N, 2K9Y, 2KSO, 2X10, 2X11, 3C8X, 3CZU, 3FL7, 3HEI, 3HPN, 3KKA, 3MBW, 3MX0, 3SKJ, 4P2K, 4PDO, 4TRL, 5EK7
Enzyme activity
EC #	BRENDA	ExPASy	KEGG	MetaCyc
2.7.10.1	↗	↗	↗	↗

Gene location (Human)
Chr.	Chromosome 1 (human)
Band	1p36.13	Start	16,124,337 bp
Band	1p36.13	End	16,156,069 bp

Gene location (Mouse)
Chr.	Chromosome 4 (mouse)
Band	4 D3|4 73.67 cM	Start	141,028,551 bp
Band	4 D3|4 73.67 cM	End	141,056,695 bp
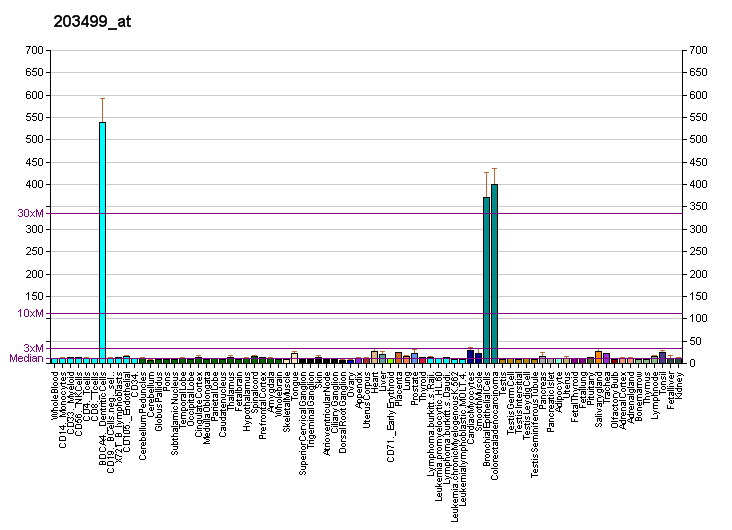
RNA expression pattern
Bgee	Human / Mouse (ortholog); Top expressed in: mucosa of pharynx; olfactory zone of nasal mucosa; vagina; gallbladder; skin of abdomen; cervix epithelium; buccal mucosa cell; skin of leg; cartilage tissue; salivary gland / Top expressed in: neural plate; lip; tail of embryo; lens; hair follicle; jejunum; duodenum; endothelial cell of lymphatic vessel; epiblast; esophagus; More reference expression data
BioGPS	More reference expression data
Gene ontology
Molecular function	nucleotide binding; protein kinase activity; transferase activity; kinase activity; protein binding; protein tyrosine kinase activity; ATP binding; ephrin receptor activity; transmembrane receptor protein tyrosine kinase activity; cadherin binding; virus receptor activity; transmembrane-ephrin receptor activity
Cellular component	integral component of membrane; cell projection; membrane; ruffle membrane; cell junction; lamellipodium membrane; leading edge membrane; focal adhesion; integral component of plasma membrane; intracellular anatomical structure; plasma membrane; lamellipodium; cell surface; neuron projection; receptor complex; tight junctions
Biological process	regulation of lamellipodium assembly; skeletal system development; negative regulation of protein kinase B signaling; cell differentiation; regulation of cell adhesion mediated by integrin; protein kinase B signaling; activation of GTPase activity; phosphorylation; transmembrane receptor protein tyrosine kinase signaling pathway; keratinocyte differentiation; vasculogenesis; multicellular organism development; protein phosphorylation; cell adhesion; blood vessel development; notochord morphogenesis; notochord cell development; angiogenesis; intrinsic apoptotic signaling pathway in response to DNA damage; neural tube development; neuron differentiation; notochord; regulation of ERK1 and ERK2 cascade; cell chemotaxis; post-anal tail morphogenesis; axial mesoderm formation; response to growth factor; viral process; cell migration; apoptotic process; peptidyl-tyrosine phosphorylation; osteoclast differentiation; osteoblast differentiation; regulation of angiogenesis; regulation of blood vessel endothelial cell migration; ephrin receptor signaling pathway; lens fiber cell morphogenesis; mammary gland epithelial cell proliferation; bone remodeling; branching involved in mammary gland duct morphogenesis; negative regulation of cytokine production; defense response to Gram-positive bacterium; negative regulation of lymphangiogenesis; blood vessel endothelial cell proliferation involved in sprouting angiogenesis; pericyte cell differentiation; negative regulation of angiogenesis; inflammatory response; negative regulation of chemokine production; blood vessel morphogenesis; cAMP metabolic process; cell motility; viral entry into host cell; positive regulation of protein localization to plasma membrane; axon guidance; protein localization to plasma membrane; positive regulation of bicellular tight junction assembly
Sources:Amigo / QuickGO
Orthologs
Databases	NCBI: entry; OMA: entry
Species	Human	Mouse
Entrez	1969	13836
Ensembl	ENSG00000142627	ENSMUSG00000006445
UniProt	P29317	Q03145
RefSeq (mRNA)	NM_004431; NM_001329090	NM_010139
RefSeq (protein)	NP_001316019; NP_004422	NP_034269
Location (UCSC)	Chr 1: 16.12 – 16.16 Mb	Chr 4: 141.03 – 141.06 Mb
PubMed search
- Wikidata
View/Edit Human	View/Edit Mouse

EPH receptor A2 (ephrin type-A receptor 2) is a protein that in humans is encoded by the EPHA2 gene.

== Function ==
This gene belongs to the ephrin receptor subfamily of the protein-tyrosine kinase family. EPH and EPH-related receptors have been implicated in mediating developmental events, particularly in the nervous system. Receptors in the EPH subfamily typically have a single kinase domain and an extracellular region containing a Cys-rich domain and 2 fibronectin type III repeats. The ephrin receptors are divided into two groups based on the similarity of their extracellular domain sequences and their affinities for binding ephrin-A and ephrin-B ligands. This gene encodes a protein that binds ephrin-A ligands.

== Clinical significance ==
It may be implicated in BRAF mutated melanomas becoming resistant to BRAF-inhibitors and MEK inhibitors. It is also the receptor by which Kaposi's sarcoma-associated herpesvirus (KSHV) enters host cells; small molecule inhibitors of EphA2 have shown some ability to block KSHV entry into human cells.

== Interactions ==
EPH receptor A2 has been shown to interact with:

- Ephrin A1
- ACP1
- Grb2,
- PIK3R1, and
- SHC1.

It was also shown that doxazosin is a small molecule agonist of EPH receptor A2.

== See also ==
- Vasculogenic mimicry
