= SAMD4B =

Protein-coding gene in the species Homo sapiens

Identifiers
- Aliases: SAMD4B, SMGB, hSmaug2, Smaug2, sterile alpha motif domain containing 4B
- External IDs: MGI: 2448542; GeneCards: SAMD4B

Gene location (Human)
Chr.	Chromosome 19 (human)
Band	19q13.2	Start	39,342,396 bp
Band	19q13.2	End	39,385,710 bp

Gene location (Mouse)
Chr.	Chromosome 7 (mouse)
Band	7|7 A3	Start	28,098,947 bp
Band	7|7 A3	End	28,297,569 bp
RNA expression pattern
Bgee	Human / Mouse (ortholog); Top expressed in: anterior pituitary; tibial nerve; C1 segment; right frontal lobe; ectocervix; gastric mucosa; left ovary; canal of the cervix; right ovary; anterior cingulate cortex / Top expressed in: genital tubercle; tail of embryo; gastrula; granulocyte; lip; perirhinal cortex; zygote; yolk sac; right ventricle; superior frontal gyrus; More reference expression data
BioGPS	n/a
Gene ontology
Molecular function	mRNA binding; translation repressor activity; RNA binding
Cellular component	nucleus; P-body; cytoplasm; cytosol
Biological process	regulation of transcription, DNA-templated; transcription, DNA-templated; nuclear-transcribed mRNA poly(A) tail shortening; regulation of mRNA stability; negative regulation of translation
Sources:Amigo / QuickGO
Orthologs
Databases	NCBI: entry; OMA: entry
Species	Human	Mouse
Entrez	55095	233033
Ensembl	ENSG00000179134	ENSMUSG00000109336
UniProt	Q5PRF9	Q80XS6
RefSeq (mRNA)	NM_001303614; NM_018028	NM_175021
RefSeq (protein)	NP_001290543; NP_060498	n/a
Location (UCSC)	Chr 19: 39.34 – 39.39 Mb	Chr 7: 28.1 – 28.3 Mb
PubMed search
- Wikidata
View/Edit Human	View/Edit Mouse

Sterile alpha motif domain containing 4B is a protein that in humans is encoded by the SAMD4B gene.
