= EPHA6 =

Protein-coding gene in the species Homo sapiens

Identifiers
- Aliases: EPHA6, EHK-2, EHK2, EK12, EPA6, HEK12, PRO57066, EPH receptor A6
- External IDs: OMIM: 600066; MGI: 108034; GeneCards: EPHA6
Enzyme activity
EC #	BRENDA	ExPASy	KEGG	MetaCyc
2.7.10.1	↗	↗	↗	↗

Gene location (Human)
Chr.	Chromosome 3 (human)
Band	3q11.2	Start	96,814,581 bp
Band	3q11.2	End	97,761,532 bp

Gene location (Mouse)
Chr.	Chromosome 16 (mouse)
Band	16|16 C1.3	Start	59,473,846 bp
Band	16|16 C1.3	End	60,425,894 bp
RNA expression pattern
Bgee	Human / Mouse (ortholog); Top expressed in: left testis; right testis; sperm; testicle; gonad; muscle layer of sigmoid colon; stromal cell of endometrium; Achilles tendon; prefrontal cortex; left ovary / Top expressed in: dentate gyrus of hippocampal formation granule cell; lumbar spinal ganglion; Region I of hippocampus proper; hippocampus proper; primary visual cortex; superior frontal gyrus; zygote; CA3 field; tongue; cartilage of the septum; More reference expression data
BioGPS	n/a
Gene ontology
Molecular function	transferase activity; nucleotide binding; protein kinase activity; kinase activity; transmembrane receptor protein tyrosine kinase activity; protein tyrosine kinase activity; ATP binding; ephrin receptor activity; molecular function; receptor tyrosine kinase; transmembrane signaling receptor activity; transmembrane-ephrin receptor activity
Cellular component	integral component of membrane; membrane; plasma membrane; integral component of plasma membrane; nucleoplasm; cellular component; cytoplasm; neuron projection; receptor complex
Biological process	phosphorylation; transmembrane receptor protein tyrosine kinase signaling pathway; protein phosphorylation; peptidyl-tyrosine phosphorylation; ephrin receptor signaling pathway; biological process; negative regulation of signal transduction; cell differentiation; negative regulation of apoptotic process; positive regulation of ERK1 and ERK2 cascade; axon guidance
Sources:Amigo / QuickGO
Orthologs
Databases	NCBI: entry; OMA: entry
Species	Human	Mouse
Entrez	285220	13840
Ensembl	ENSG00000080224	ENSMUSG00000055540
UniProt	Q9UF33	Q62413
RefSeq (mRNA)	NM_001080448; NM_001278300; NM_001278301; NM_173655	NM_007938
RefSeq (protein)	NP_001073917; NP_001265229; NP_001265230; NP_775926	NP_031964
Location (UCSC)	Chr 3: 96.81 – 97.76 Mb	Chr 16: 59.47 – 60.43 Mb
PubMed search
- Wikidata
View/Edit Human	View/Edit Mouse

Ephrin type-A receptor 6 is a protein that in humans is encoded by the EPHA6 gene.

EphA6 may serve an important role in breast carcinogenesis and may pose as a novel prognostic indicator and therapeutic target for breast cancer, particularly in patients with steroid receptor negative expression and HER‑2 overexpression
