= EPHA8 =

Protein-coding gene in humans

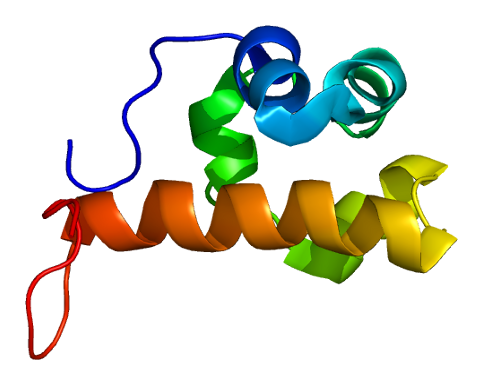

Identifiers
- Aliases: EPHA8, EEK, EK3, HEK3, EPH receptor A8
- External IDs: OMIM: 176945; MGI: 109378; GeneCards: EPHA8
Available structures
PDB	Ortholog search: PDBe RCSB
PDB	List of PDB id codes 1UCV, 1X5L, 3KUL
Enzyme activity
EC #	BRENDA	ExPASy	KEGG	MetaCyc
2.7.10.1	↗	↗	↗	↗

Gene location (Human)
Chr.	Chromosome 1 (human)
Band	1p36.12	Start	22,563,489 bp
Band	1p36.12	End	22,603,595 bp

Gene location (Mouse)
Chr.	Chromosome 4 (mouse)
Band	4|4 D3	Start	136,929,419 bp
Band	4|4 D3	End	136,956,816 bp
RNA expression pattern
Bgee	Human / Mouse (ortholog); Top expressed in: endothelial cell; gonad; spleen; hypothalamus; secondary oocyte; mesencephalon; substantia nigra; prefrontal cortex; cingulate gyrus; anterior cingulate cortex / Top expressed in: neural layer of retina; cerebellar cortex; Ileal epithelium; perirhinal cortex; visual cortex; superior frontal gyrus; lacrimal groove; primary visual cortex; entorhinal cortex; lens; More reference expression data
BioGPS	n/a
Gene ontology
Molecular function	transferase activity; nucleotide binding; protein kinase activity; kinase activity; transmembrane receptor protein tyrosine kinase activity; protein tyrosine kinase activity; ATP binding; ephrin receptor activity; GPI-linked ephrin receptor activity; receptor tyrosine kinase; transmembrane signaling receptor activity; transmembrane-ephrin receptor activity
Cellular component	integral component of membrane; endosome; cell projection; early endosome membrane; membrane; integral component of plasma membrane; plasma membrane; neuron projection; cytoplasm; receptor complex
Biological process	phosphorylation; transmembrane receptor protein tyrosine kinase signaling pathway; nervous system development; multicellular organism development; protein phosphorylation; cell adhesion; peptidyl-tyrosine phosphorylation; substrate-dependent cell migration; protein autophosphorylation; axon guidance; neuron projection development; regulation of cell adhesion; regulation of cell adhesion mediated by integrin; neuron remodeling; positive regulation of phosphatidylinositol 3-kinase activity; ephrin receptor signaling pathway; positive regulation of MAPK cascade; cellular response to follicle-stimulating hormone stimulus; negative regulation of signal transduction; cell differentiation; negative regulation of apoptotic process; positive regulation of ERK1 and ERK2 cascade
Sources:Amigo / QuickGO
Orthologs
Databases	NCBI: entry; OMA: entry
Species	Human	Mouse
Entrez	2046	13842
Ensembl	ENSG00000070886	ENSMUSG00000028661
UniProt	P29322	O09127
RefSeq (mRNA)	NM_001006943; NM_020526	NM_007939
RefSeq (protein)	NP_001006944; NP_065387	NP_031965
Location (UCSC)	Chr 1: 22.56 – 22.6 Mb	Chr 4: 136.93 – 136.96 Mb
PubMed search
- Wikidata
View/Edit Human	View/Edit Mouse

Ephrin type-A receptor 8 is a protein that in humans is encoded by the EPHA8 gene.

== Function ==
This gene encodes a member of the ephrin receptor subfamily of the protein-tyrosine kinase family. EPH and EPH-related receptors have been implicated in mediating developmental events, particularly in the nervous system. Receptors in the EPH subfamily typically have a single kinase domain and an extracellular region containing a Cys-rich domain and 2 fibronectin type III repeats. The ephrin receptors are divided into 2 groups based on the similarity of their extracellular domain sequences and their affinities for binding ephrin-A and ephrin-B ligands. The protein encoded by this gene functions as a receptor for ephrin A2, A3 and A5 and plays a role in short-range contact-mediated axonal guidance during development of the mammalian nervous system.

== Interactions ==
EPHA8 has been shown to interact with FYN.
