= List of Case Western Reserve University people =

This is a list of notable individuals associated with Case Western Reserve University, including students, alumni, and faculty.

== Arts, journalism and entertainment ==
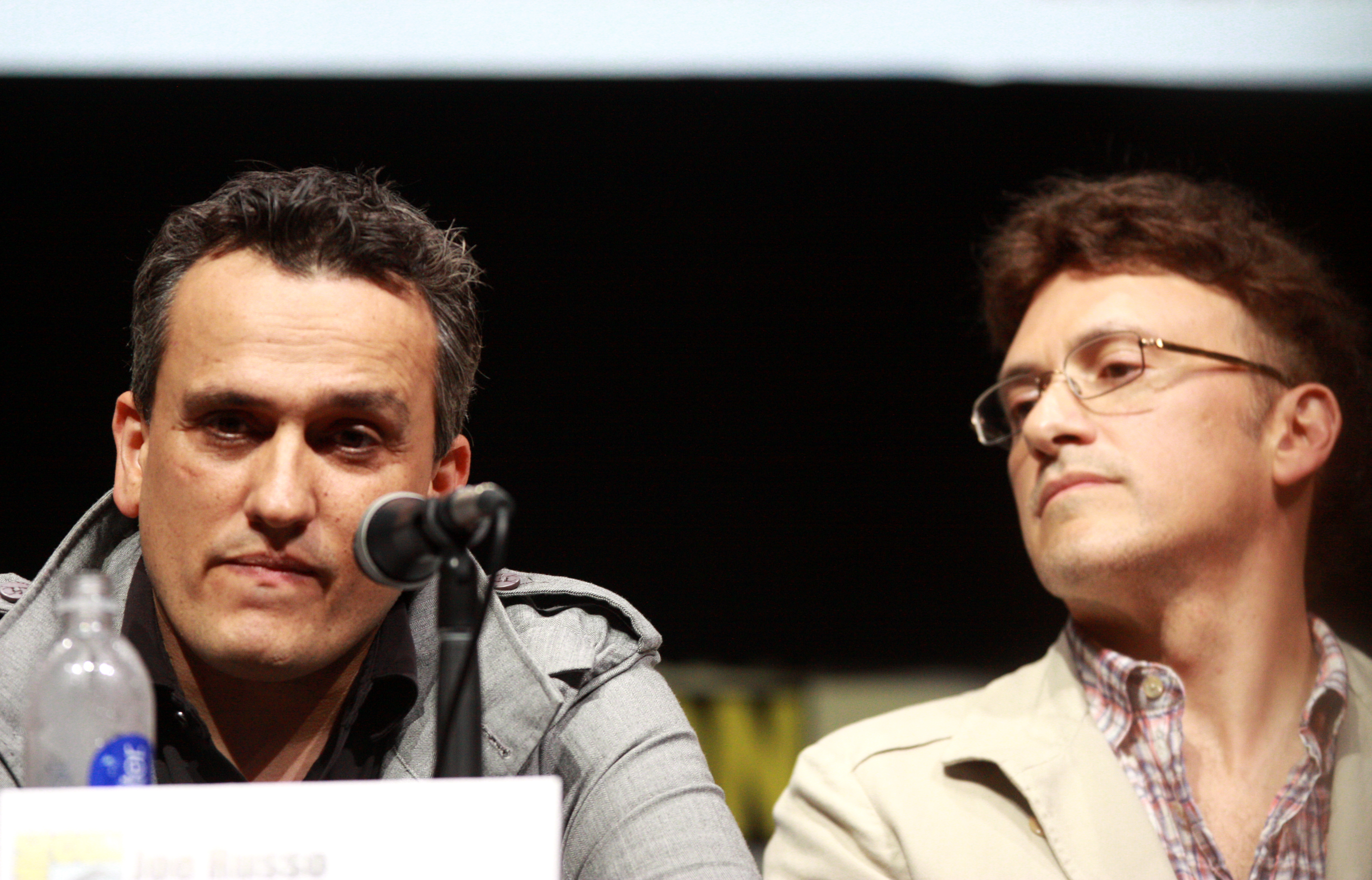
Directors Anthony Russo and Joe Russo have directed world-famous blockbusters Captain America: The Winter Soldier, Captain America: Civil War, Avengers: Infinity War and Avengers: Endgame.

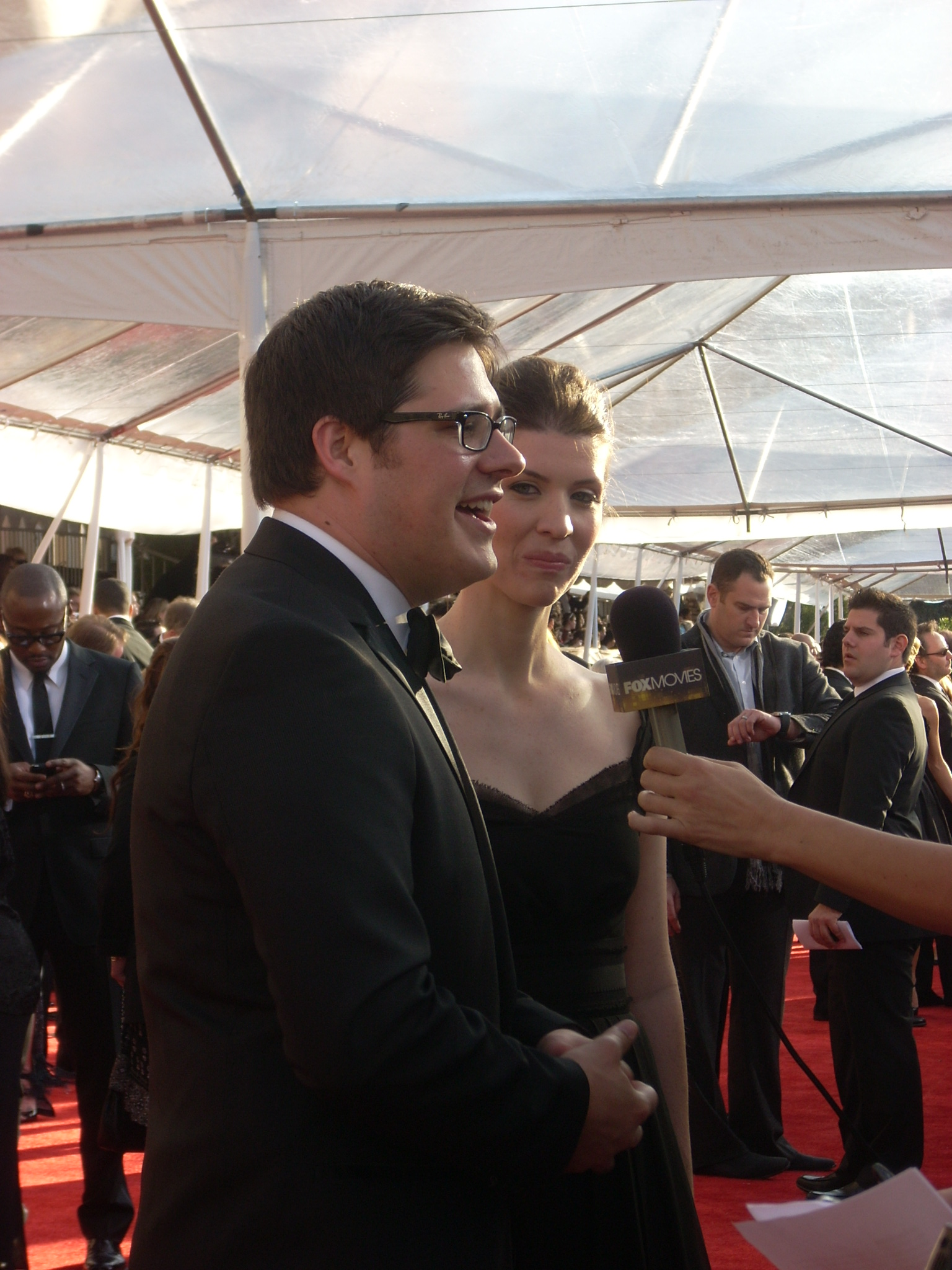
Actor Rich Sommer appeared in Mad Men and The Devil Wears Prada.

- Barbara Allyne Bennet – actress and member of Screen Actors Guild (SAG) national board of directors (2005–2007)
- James Card – longtime film curator at George Eastman House
- Mary Carruthers – among the world's foremost scholars on medieval religious literature
- Janis Carter – film actress of 1940s and '50s
- Gordon Cobbledick – recipient of J. G. Taylor Spink Award, the highest award given by the Baseball Writers' Association of America
- Brenda Miller Cooper – operatic soprano
- Franklin Cover – actor, Tom Willis in The Jeffersons
- Jasmine Cresswell – best-selling author of over 50 romance novels
- William Eleroy Curtis – journalist, diplomat, and advocate of Pan-Americanism
- Anu Garg – author and speaker
- Susie Gharib – co-anchor of Nightly Business Report
- Gregg Gillis – musician; performs as Girl Talk
- Dorothy Hart – film actress of 1940s and '50s
- Jan Hopkins – journalist (CNN financial news show Street Sweep)
- John Howard – actor, known for The Philadelphia Story and Bulldog Drummond films
- Hal Lebovitz – recipient of J. G. Taylor Spink Award, the highest award given by the Baseball Writers' Association of America
- Marc Parnell – second-most published ornithologist in the world, author of 41 bird-identification guides
- M. Scott Peck – author of The Road Less Traveled and other self-help books
- Harvey Pekar – comic book writer, creator of American Splendor
- Jack Perkins – dubbed "America's most literate correspondent" by Associated Press; reporter, commentator, war correspondent, anchorman; seen on NBC's Nightly News and The Today Show, and on A&E as host of Biography
- Alan Rosenberg – actor; played Ira Woodbine on TV series Cybill; Emmy-nominated for guest appearance on ER; elected president of Screen Actors Guild in 2005
- Joe Russo and Anthony Russo – brothers, co-alumni, and directors of films Captain America: The Winter Soldier, Captain America: Civil War, Avengers: Infinity War, Avengers: Endgame, Welcome to Collinwood, and TV series Arrested Development; producers of NBC's Community
- Alix Kates Shulman – author of Memoir of an Ex-Prom Queen and To Love What Is
- Rich Sommer – MFA theater alumnus; appeared in The Devil Wears Prada, Mad Men, and with Upright Citizens Brigade
- Emma Rood Tuttle – writer
- Thrity Umrigar – journalist; author of Bombay Time
- Andrew Vachss – lawyer and child protection consultant; author of the Burke series
- Roger Zelazny – science fiction and fantasy author; three-time Nebula Award winner and six-time Hugo Award winner; works include Lord of Light, Eye of Cat, and The Dream Master

== Business and philanthropy ==
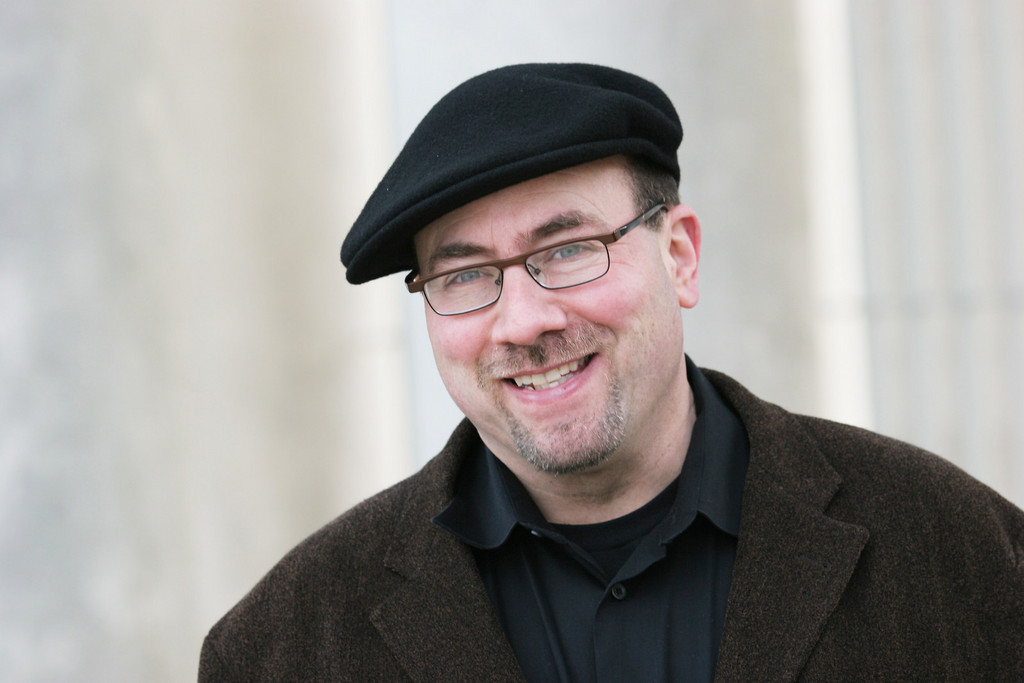
Craig Newmark (BS '75, MS '77), tech billionaire, philanthropist, founder of Craigslist

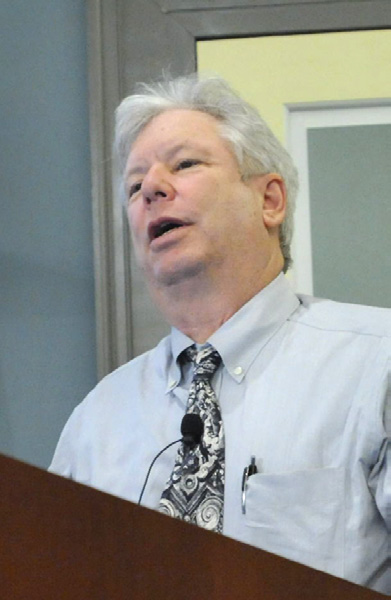
Richard Thaler (BA '67) is one of the founders of behavioral economics and recipient of the 2017 Nobel Prize in Economics.

- William F. Baker – president and CEO of public television's flagship station Thirteen/WNET in New York
- Ou Chin-der – former deputy mayor of Taipei, Taiwan; current chairman and CEO of the Taiwan High Speed Rail Corporation
- William Daroff – chief executive officer at the Conference of Presidents of Major American Jewish Organizations; former member of the U.S. Commission for the Preservation of America's Heritage Abroad
- Bob Herbold – executive vice president at Microsoft
- Pete Koomen – co-founder and CTO of Optimizely
- Tshilidzi Marwala – academic, businessman and community leader
- Barry Meyer – chairman and former CEO of Warner Bros
- Allen J. Mistysyn – CFO of Sherwin-Williams
- John Neff – value investor who led Vanguard's Windsor Fund, the largest and highest returning mutual fund of the 1980s
- Craig Newmark – founder of Craigslist, tech billionaire, philanthropist
- Philip Orbanes – former VP with Parker Brothers; founding partner and President of Winning Moves
- Arthur L. Parker – founder of Parker Hannifin
- Richard Thaler (BA '67) – Nobel laureate, father of behavioral finance, and behavioral economics pioneer
- Peter Tippett – inventor of Norton (Symantec) Anti-Virus and CTO of CyberTrust
- Tom Tribone – founder and CEO of Guggenheim Global Infrastructure Company
- Donald E. Washkewicz – former CEO of Parker Hannifin
- Mark Weinberger (JD/MBA '87) – CEO and chairman of Ernst & Young
- Edward Porter Williams – co-founder of Sherwin-Williams
- Nadya Zhexembayeva – founder of Reinvention Academy

== Education ==
- Edna Allyn – first librarian of the Hawaii State Library
- Clara Breed – librarian, known for her "Dear Miss Breed" correspondence with children in Japanese American internment camps during World War II
- Emile B. De Sauzé – language educator known for developing the conversational method of learning a language
- Betty Fairfax – educator, counselor, and philanthropist
- Susan Helper – Frank Tracy Carlton Professor of Economics at the Weatherhead School of Management
- Josephine Irwin – suffragist and educator
- Lena Beatrice Morton – literary scholar, head of the humanities division at Texas College; earned her PhD from Case Western in 1947
- Regenia A. Perry – one of the first African American women to earn a Ph.D. in art history, alumni with MA (1962) and PhD (1966)
- Vivian Blanche Small – president, Lake Erie College

== Government and military ==
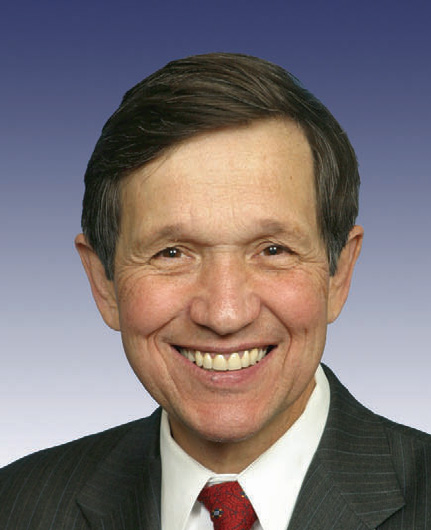
Dennis Kucinich, U.S. Representative (1997–2013) and U.S. presidential candidate (2004 and 2008)

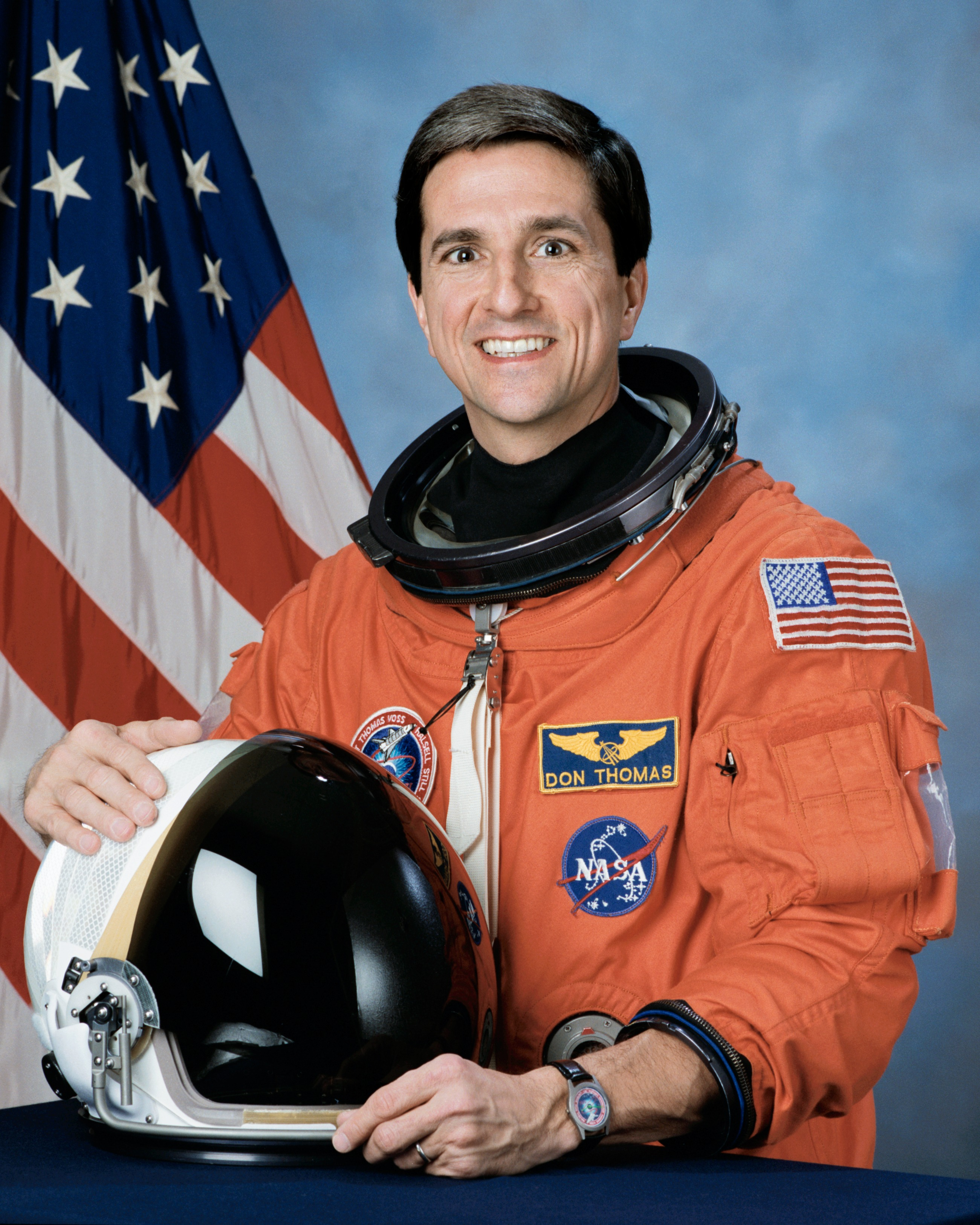
Don Thomas, former NASA Astronaut. (Physics BS '73)

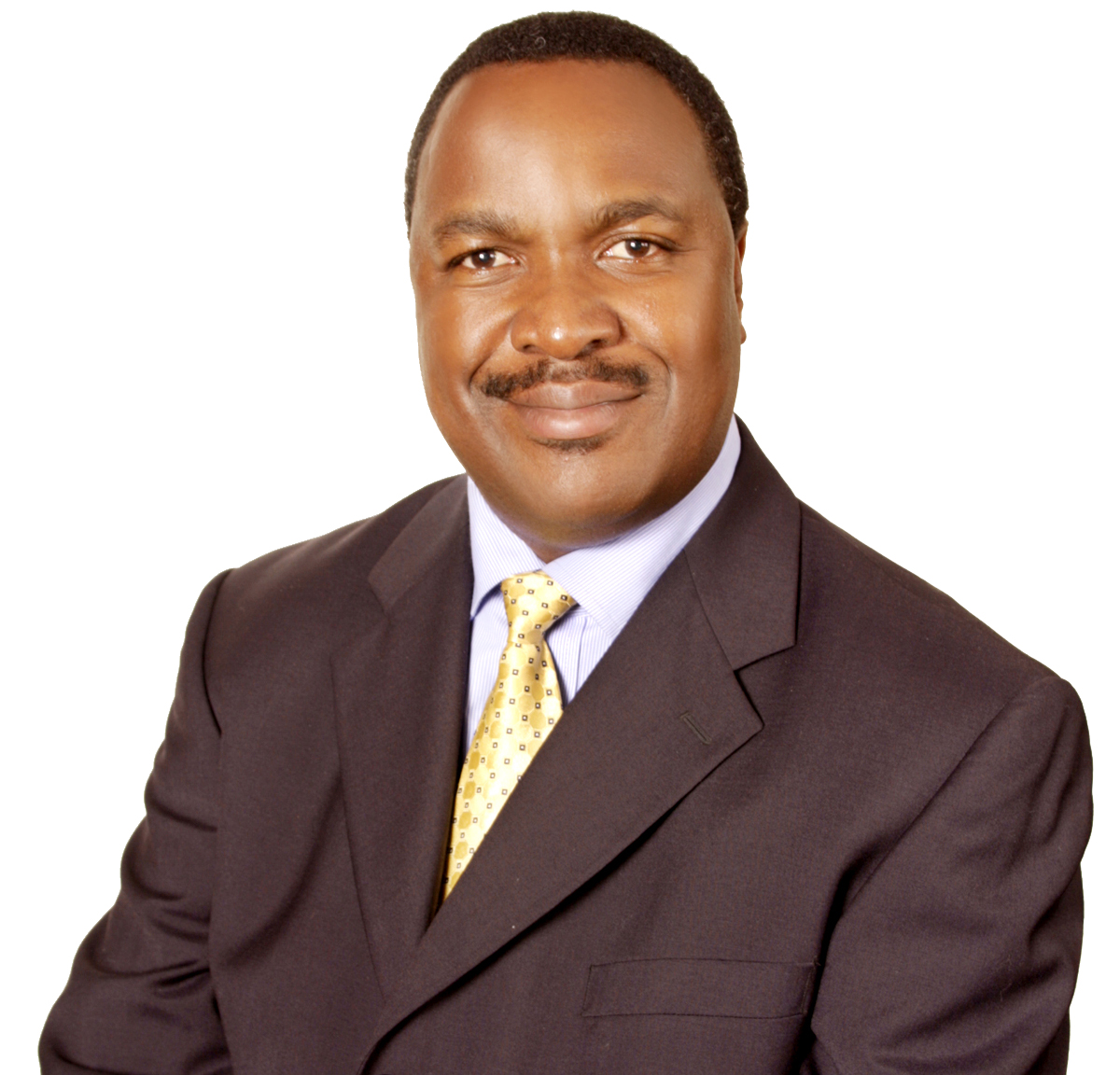
Elioda Tumwesigye, member of Parliament and Cabinet Minister of Science Technology & Innovation, Republic of Uganda

- John V. Azzariti (CWRU 1988) – physician; state legislator; member, New Jersey General Assembly (2024–present)
- John E. Barnes Jr. – member of Ohio House of Representatives
- Janet Bewley – member of the Wisconsin Legislature
- Justin Bibb – 58th and current mayor of Cleveland
- Zdravka Bušić – member of the European Parliament
- John Cairncross – Soviet spy and member of the Cambridge Five
- Gilbert S. Carpenter (1836–1904) – US Army brigadier general
- Thomas J. Carran (1841–1894) – Ohio state senator
- François-Philippe Champagne – Canadian member of Parliament for Saint-Maurice—Champlain
- Schive Chi – governor of Fujian Province and Minister without Portfolio, Republic of China (Taiwan)
- Victor Ciorbea – prime minister of Romania (1996–1998)
- Bruce Cole – 8th chairman of the National Endowment for the Humanities
- John Charles Cutler – acting chief of the venereal disease program in the United States Public Health Service and head of the Guatemala and the Tuskegee syphilis experiments
- William Daroff – chief executive officer at the Conference of Presidents of Major American Jewish Organizations; former member of the U.S. Commission for the Preservation of America's Heritage Abroad
- Benjamin O. Davis Jr. – first African-American to receive star in US Air Force; awarded Distinguished Flying Cross in 1943; assistant secretary of transportation under Richard Nixon
- Lincoln Díaz-Balart – U.S. representative
- Alene B. Duerk – first female rear admiral in the United States Navy
- James A. Garfield – served on the University Board of Trustees
- T. Keith Glennan – Case Institute of Technology president, first NASA administrator
- Subir Gokarn (Ph.D.) – deputy governor of the Reserve Bank of India
- Paul Hackett – Iraq War veteran and former Congressional candidate
- Rutherford B. Hayes – 19th president of the United States, served on the University Board of Trustees
- John Hutchins – former U.S. representative
- Stephanie Tubbs Jones – former U.S. representative
- Ron Klein – U.S. representative
- Dennis Kucinich – former U.S. representative
- Clarence Lam – Maryland state senator
- James Thomas Lynn – United States Secretary of Housing and Urban Development under Richard Nixon; Director of the Office of Management and Budget under Gerald Ford
- Josh Mandel (J.D.) – Ohio State Treasurer
- Nicole Nason (J.D.) – administrator of the Federal Highway Administration
- Ogiame Atuwatse III – 21st Olu of Warri Kingdom
- Salvatore Pais – inventor and aerospace engineer, U.S. Navy and Air Force
- Alfredo Palacio – president of Ecuador, completed medical residency at Case
- Raymond Stanton Patton (Ph.B.) – rear admiral and first flag officer of the United States Coast and Geodetic Survey Corps
- Trista Piccola – former director of the Rhode Island Department of Children, Youth & Families
- Paul A. Russo – ambassador of the United States to Barbados, Dominica, St Lucia, Antigua, St. Vincent, and St. Christopher-Nevis-Anguilla
- David Satcher – 16th Surgeon General of the United States
- Milton Shapp – governor of Pennsylvania and 1976 Democratic presidential candidate
- Louis Stokes – former U.S. representative
- Don Thomas – former NASA astronaut
- Elioda Tumwesigye – member of Parliament Sheema North and Cabinet Minister of Science, Technology and Innovation Republic of Uganda
- Michael R. Turner – U.S. representative
- William H. Upson – former U.S. representative
- Andrew R. Wheeler – deputy administrator (and acting administrator) of the United States Environmental Protection Agency
- Milton A. Wolf – former U.S. ambassador to Austria
- Julie Stufft – current U.S. ambassador to Kazakhstan

== History ==
- Robert C. Binkley – chair of history at Flora Stone Mather College, 1930–1940
- Melvin Kranzberg – professor of history (1952–1971)
- James Alexander Robertson – academic historian, archivist, and bibliographer (Ph.D., 1896)
- Ted Steinberg – professor of history (1996–present)

== Law ==
See Notable Graduates section

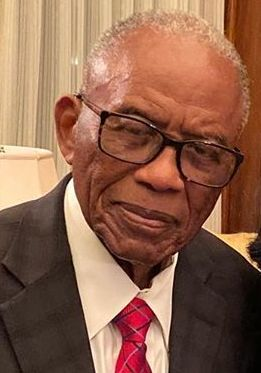
Attorney Fred Gray represented Rosa Parks, Rev. Martin Luther King Jr., and the Tuskegee syphilis experiment victims in his career. He marched from Selma to Montgomery.

- William Bentley Ball – prominent constitutional lawyer known for his defense of religious liberty
- John Hessin Clarke – undergraduate class of 1877, justice of the Supreme Court of the United States
- Robin Ficker – attorney and NBA heckler
- Fred Gray – attorney to the civil rights movement of the 1950s and 60s, later president of the National Bar Association and first African-American president of the Alabama State Bar
- Rosemonde Pierre-Louis, Haitian-American activist and attorney for women's and immigrant rights
- Edmund A. Sargus Jr. – U.S. District Court judge
- James Sokolove – undergraduate class of 1966, pioneer in legal television advertising; philanthropist

== Science, technology, and medicine ==
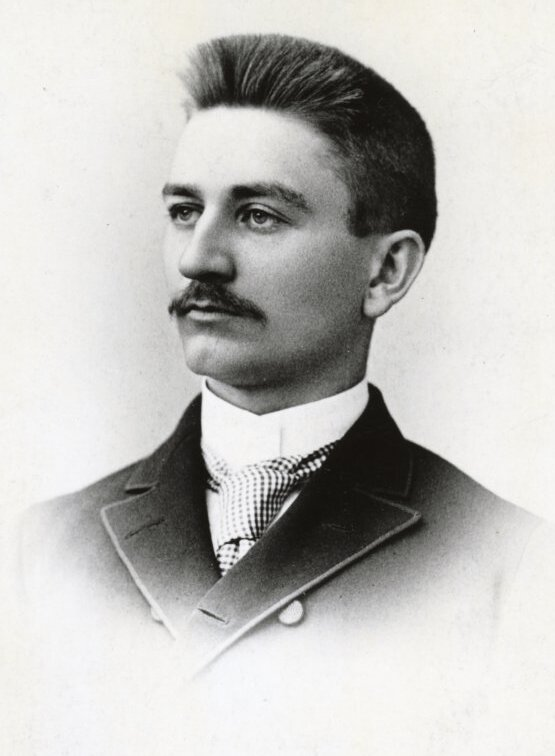
Case alum Herbert Henry Dow, founder of Dow Chemical

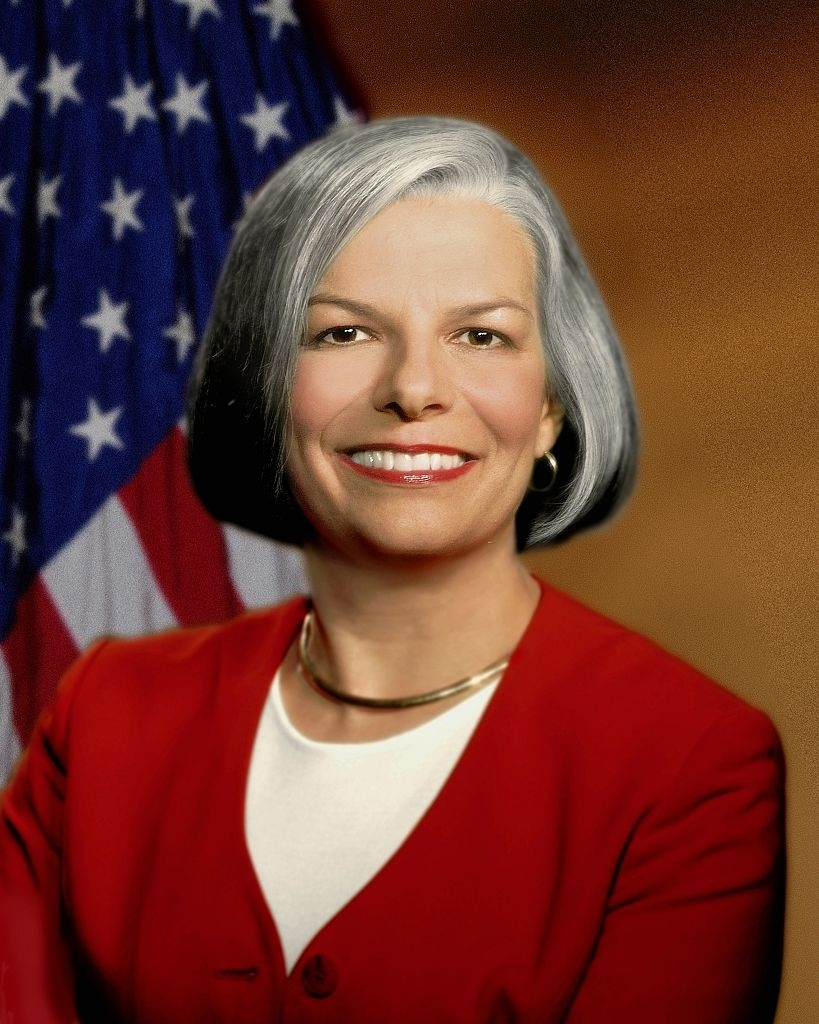
Julie Gerberding, former director of the U.S. Centers for Disease Control and Prevention

John Macleod, 1923 Nobel Prize winner for discovering insulin and Western Reserve University Professor of Physiology

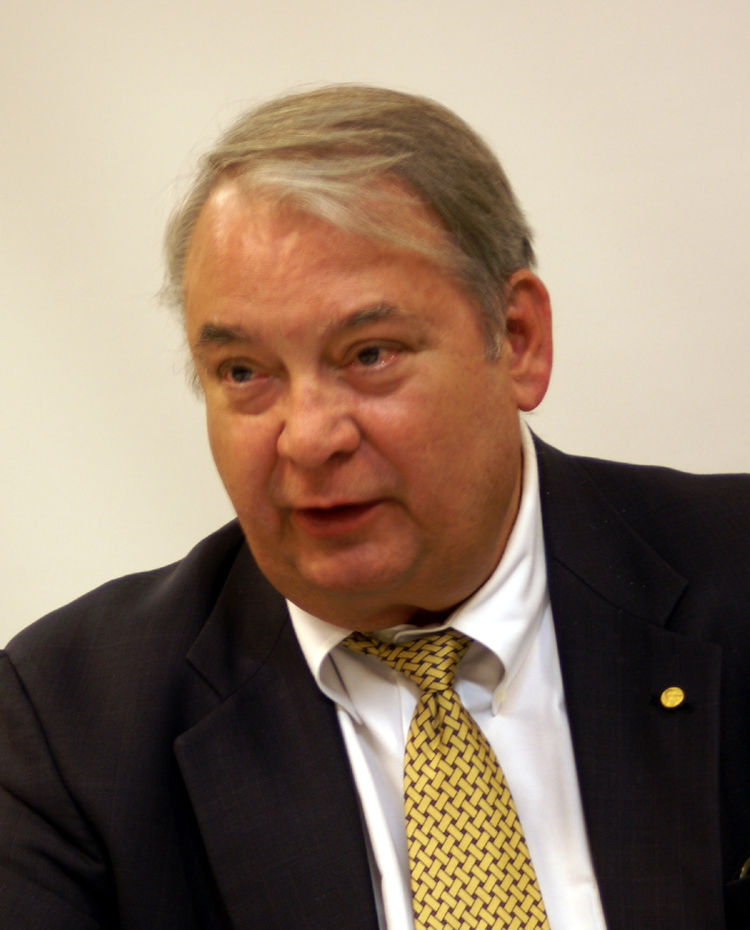
Ferid Murad, 1998 Nobel Laureate and Case Medical School MD/PhD alumnus

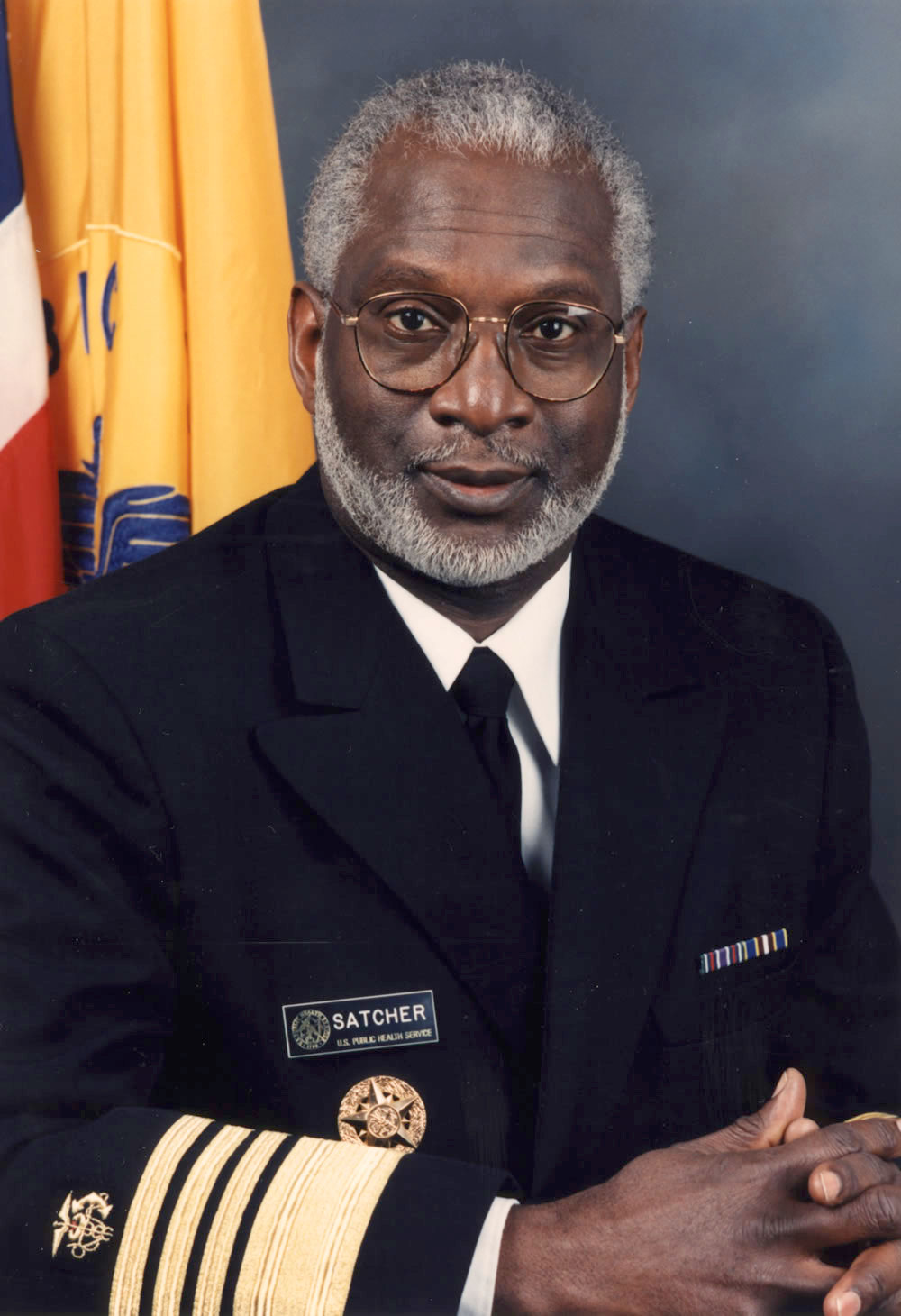
David Satcher, former Surgeon General of the United States

- Peter B. Armentrout – distinguished chemistry professor, University of Utah
- Roger Bacon – inventor of carbon fiber
- Hans Baumann – inventor and engineer
- Paul Berg – winner of the 1980 Nobel Prize in Chemistry, for biochemical characterization of recombinant DNA
- John Blangero – human geneticist; highly cited scientist in the field of complex disease genetics
- Murielle Bochud – Swiss physician, co-chief of the Department of Epidemiology and Health Systems at the Unisanté in Lausanne
- Francois Boller – Swiss neurologist
- Paul Buchheit – 23rd employee of Google and creator of Gmail
- Clemens Burda - inventor of nanotechnology and Case Western professor
- Neil W. Chamberlain – economist and industrial relations scholar (A.B., 1937; M.A., 1939)
- Philippe G. Ciarlet – mathematician known for work on finite element method; received his Ph.D. from the Case Institute of Technology 1966 and was awarded the Légion d'honneur in 1999
- Elizabeth Cosgriff-Hernandez – biomedical engineer who works on scaffolds for tissue regeneration
- M. Jamal Deen, CM – Order of Canada and Senior Canada Research Chair in Information Technology at McMaster University
- Conor P. Delaney – colorectal surgeon known for laparoscopy and developing enhanced recovery pathways
- Herbert Henry Dow – founder of Dow Chemical
- Slayton A. Evans Jr. – research chemist and professor
- Xyla Foxlin – engineer, entrepreneur and YouTuber
- Richard L. Garwin – physicist, designer of first hydrogen bomb, presidential advisor and recipient of the Presidential Medal of Freedom
- H. Jack Geiger – founding member and past president of Physicians for Social Responsibility and Physicians for Human Rights
- Julie Gerberding – first woman director of the Centers for Disease Control and Prevention
- Alfred G. Gilman – co-winner of the 1994 Nobel Prize in Physiology or Medicine, for co-discovery of G proteins
- Donald A. Glaser – winner of the 1960 Nobel Prize in Physics, for invention of the bubble chamber
- Millicent Goldschmidt – microbiologist, worked on NASA Lunar Receiving Laboratory and University of Texas
- Siegfried S. Hecker – director of Los Alamos National Laboratory (1986–1997)
- Joseph A. Helpern – emeritus professor at Medical University of South Carolina
- Corneille Heymans – winner of the 1938 Nobel Prize in Physiology or Medicine for work on carotid sinus reflex
- Samuel Hibben – pioneer in blacklight technology; designed the lighting displays for the Statue of Liberty and other national monuments
- Bambang Hidayat – astronomer, former vice president of the International Astronomical Union
- George H. Hitchings – co-winner of the 1988 Nobel Prize in Physiology or Medicine, for research leading to development of drugs to treat leukemia, organ transplant rejection, gout, herpes virus, and AIDS-related bacterial and pulmonary infections
- Dorothy Evans Holmes – psychoanalytic thinker known for her work on racial and cultural trauma
- Robert W. Kearns – inventor of the intermittent windshield wiper systems used on most automobiles since 1969; won one of the best-known patent infringement cases against a major corporation
- Jane Kessler – psychologist
- Donald Knuth – computer scientist and winner of the Turing Award (1974)
- Lawrence M. Krauss – physicist in the field of dark energy; bestselling author (The Physics of Star Trek)
- Polykarp Kusch – winner of the 1955 Nobel Prize in Physics, for determining the magnetic moment of the electron
- George Trumbull Ladd (1842–1921) – philosopher, educator, and psychologist; first foreigner to receive the Second (conferred in 1907) and Third (conferred in 1899) Orders of the Rising Sun
- Paul C. Lauterbur – co-winner of the 2003 Nobel Prize in Physiology or Medicine, for discoveries leading to creation of MRI
- Matthew N. Levy – cardiac physiologist and textbook author
- John Macleod – co-winner of the 1923 Nobel Prize in Physiology or Medicine, for discovery of insulin
- Sidney Wilcox McCuskey – astronomer noted for his work on the Milky Way galaxy
- Albert A. Michelson – winner of the 1907 Nobel Prize in Physics, for disproving existence of "ether"; first American to receive a Nobel Prize
- Edward Morley – performed interferometry experiment with Michelson
- Ferid Murad – co-winner of the 1998 Nobel Prize in Physiology or Medicine, for role in the discovery of nitric oxide in cardiovascular signaling
- George A. Olah – winner of the 1994 Nobel Prize in Chemistry, for contributions to carbocation chemistry
- Amit Patel – stem cell surgeon who demonstrated stem cell transplantation can treat congestive heart failure
- Raymond Stanton Patton (Ph.B.) – engineer, rear admiral and first flag officer of the United States Coast and Geodetic Survey Corps and second director of the United States Coast and Geodetic Survey (1929–1937)
- M. Scott Peck – psychiatrist; author of The Road Less Traveled
- David Pedlar – director of research at the National Headquarters of Veterans Affairs Canada
- James Polshek – architect; designed William J. Clinton Presidential Library
- Edward C. Prescott – co-winner of the 2004 Nobel Prize in Economic Sciences, for theory on business cycles and economic policies
- Charles Burleigh Purvis (1865) – leading physician at Howard University and the Freedmen's Hospital
- Frederick Reines – co-winner of the 1995 Nobel Prize in Physics, for the detection of the neutrino
- Barry Richmond – developer of the iThink simulation environment
- Frederick C. Robbins – co-winner of the 1954 Nobel Prize in Physiology or Medicine, for work on polio virus, which led to development of polio vaccines; past president of the Institute of Medicine of the National Academy of Sciences
- M. Frank Rudy – inventor of the Nike air sole
- John Ruhl – physicist currently studying cosmic microwave background radiation
- David Satcher – U.S. Surgeon General under President Clinton; first African-American director of the Centers for Disease Control and Prevention
- Terry Sejnowski – pioneer in the field of neural networks and computational neuroscience; one of only ten living scientists to have been elected to all three national academies (IOM, NAS and NAE)
- Jesse Leonard Steinfeld – U.S. Surgeon General (1969–1973), noted for achieving widespread fluoridation of water, requiring prescription drugs to be effective, and strengthening the Surgeon General's warning on cigarettes
- Earl W. Sutherland – winner of 1971 Nobel Prize in Physiology or Medicine, for establishing identity and importance of cyclic AMP in regulation of cell metabolism
- Lars Georg Svensson – instrumental in the development of minimally invasive keyhole surgery and leader in aortic valve surgery
- Peter Tippett – developer of the first anti-virus software, "Vaccine" (later sold and renamed Norton AntiVirus)
- Walter J. Tomasch – physicist and fellow of the American Physical Society
- Edward Ellsworth Underwood – early African American medical doctor, community leader, and minister
- Alfred Wilhelmi – biochemist, medical researcher, and academic

== Sports ==
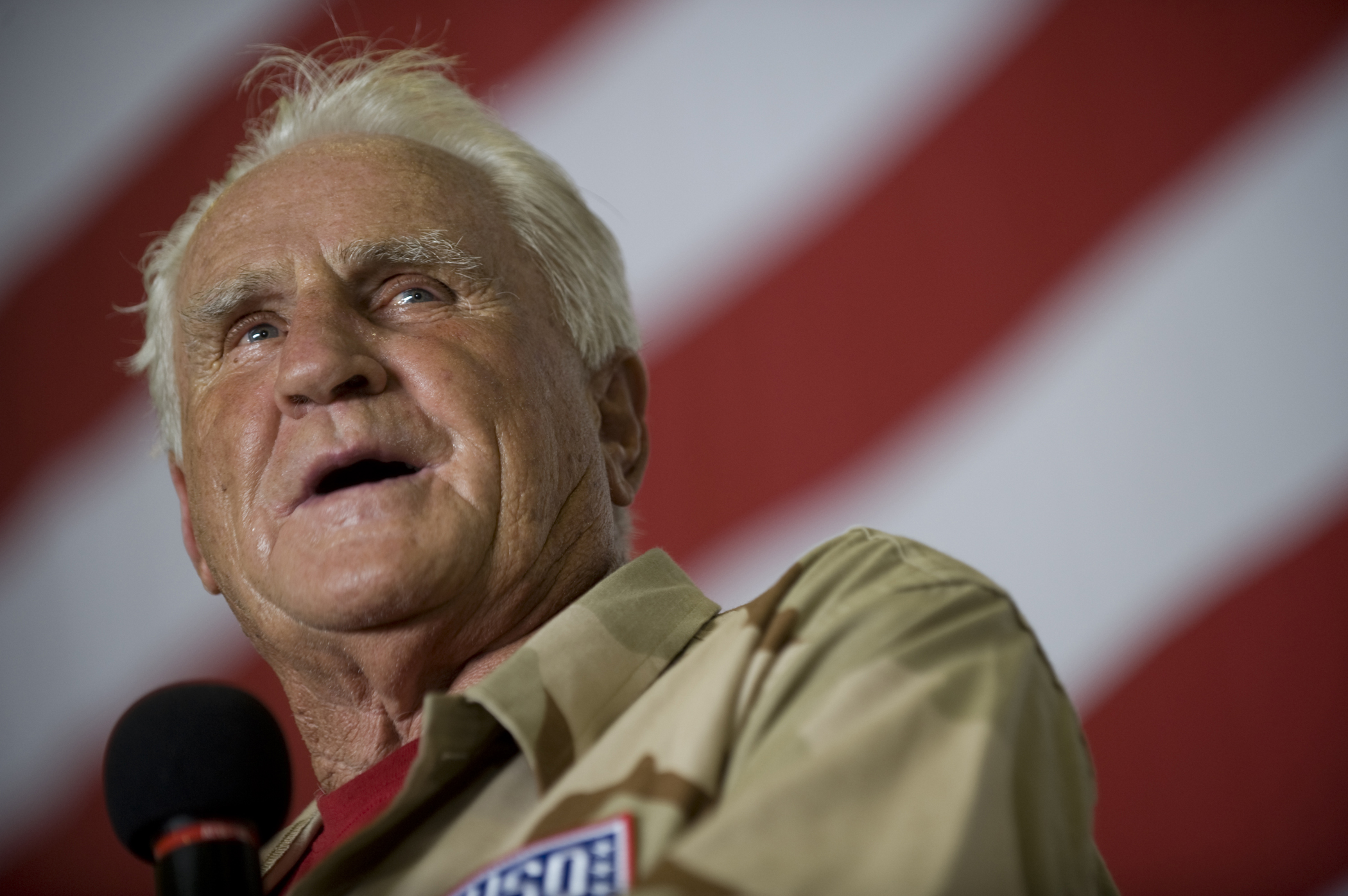
Case alum Don Shula (MA Physical Education '53), former coach of the Miami Dolphins

- Ed Andrews – Major League Baseball player
- John Badaczewski – professional football player for the Washington Redskins and Chicago Bears
- Steve Belichick – professional football player for the Detroit Lions and college football coach; father of NFL coach Bill Belichick
- Manute Bol – at one time the tallest player to play in the National Basketball Association
- Dick Booth – professional football player for the Detroit Lions
- Esther Erb – marathon runner
- Ed Kagy – professional football player and founder of Gyro International
- William Kerslake – Olympic wrestler and co-inventor of the first ion thruster for space propulsion
- Sandy Knott – Olympic runner for outdoor track and field
- Warren Lahr – NFL All-Pro defensive back who played 11 seasons with the Cleveland Browns
- Bill Lund – professional football player for the Cleveland Browns
- Ray Mack – professional baseball player for the Cleveland Indians, New York Yankees, and Chicago Cubs; All-Star second baseman in 1940
- Michael McCaskey – chairman of the board, Chicago Bears
- Paul O'Dea – outfielder for the Cleveland Indians
- Peggy Parratt – professional football player credited for throwing the first forward pass in professional football
- Milton C. Portmann – professional football player, CWRU Hall of Fame class of 1976 for football, track, and hockey; selected to the WRU 50-Year Football All-Star Team at offensive tackle
- Phil Ragazzo – professional football player for the Cleveland Rams, Philadelphia Eagles, and New York Giants
- Mike Rodak – professional football player for the Cleveland Rams, Detroit Lions, and Pittsburgh Steelers
- George Roman – professional football player for the New York Giants
- Frank Ryan – professional football player; quarterback for the Cleveland Browns; holds a PhD in math
- Mickey Sanzotta – professional football player for the Detroit Lions
- Don Shula (MA Physical Education '53) – former coach of the Miami Dolphins, member of Pro Football Hall of Fame
- Denny Shute – professional golfer, British Open and PGA Championship champion
- Bianca Smith – first black woman hired to coach for Major League Baseball, hired for the Boston Red Sox
- Mark Termini – Hall of Fame basketball player for Case Western Reserve University, sports attorney and NBA agent/contract negotiator
- Del Wertz – professional football and baseball player
- Dan Whalen – Arena Football League quarterback for the Cleveland Gladiators and Orlando Predators
- Johnny Wilson – professional football player for the Cleveland Rams

== See also ==
- List of presidents of Case Western Reserve University
- List of Case Western Reserve University Nobel laureates
