= Frederick Chapman Robbins =

American Nobel Prize recipient

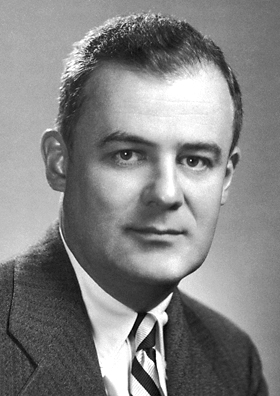
- Born: August 25, 1916; Auburn, Alabama
- Died: August 4, 2003 (aged 86); Cleveland, Ohio
- Education: University of Missouri; Harvard University
- Awards: E. Mead Johnson Award (1953); Nobel Prize in Physiology or Medicine (1954)
- Scientific career
- Fields: Pediatrics; Virology
- Workplaces: Case Western Reserve University

Frederick Chapman Robbins (August 25, 1916 – August 4, 2003) was an American pediatrician and virologist. He was born in Auburn, Alabama, and grew up in Columbia, Missouri, attending David H. Hickman High School.

He received the Nobel Prize in Physiology or Medicine in 1954 along with John Franklin Enders and Thomas Huckle Weller, making Robbins the only Nobel laureate born in Alabama. The award was for breakthrough work in isolating and growing the poliovirus in tissue culture, paving the way for vaccines developed by Jonas Salk and Albert Sabin. He attended the University of Missouri and Harvard University.

In 1952, he was appointed professor of pediatrics at Case Western Reserve University. Robbins was elected a fellow of the American Academy of Arts and Sciences in 1962. From 1966 to 1980, Robbins was dean of the School of Medicine at Case Western. He was elected to the American Philosophical Society in 1972. In 1980, he assumed the presidency of the National Academy of Sciences' Institute of Medicine. He had been a member of the National Academy of Sciences since 1972. Five years later, in 1985, Robbins returned to Case Western Reserve as dean emeritus and distinguished university professor emeritus. He continued to be a fixture at the medical school until his death in 2003. The medical school's Frederick C. Robbins Society is named in his honor. His wife, Alice N. Robbins, died in 2016. She was the daughter of Nobel laureate John Howard Northrop.

Robbins received the Benjamin Franklin Medal for Distinguished Achievement in the Sciences of the American Philosophical Society in 1999.

== See also ==
- List of Case Western people
