= Expenditure Management Commission =

The constitution of Expenditure Management Commission (EMC) of India was announced in the Budget Speech by Finance Minister of India Arun Jaitley in the budget of 2014–15. The Commission was a recommendation body with the primary responsibility of suggesting major expenditure reforms that will enable the government to reduce and manage its fiscal deficit at a more sustainable levels.

The EMC was a five-member body composed of the former Reserve Bank of India (RBI) Governor Bimal Jalan, as the head of the Commission, former Finance Secretary Sumit Bose, former Deputy RBI Governor Subir Gokarn and two other members.

Despite the legal mandate intended to lower the Fiscal Deficit to 3 per cent within the stipulated time Fiscal Responsibility and Budgetary Management Act, 2003, India has witnessed a persistent high fiscal deficit. Subsidies, public services, underpricing and arbitrary natural resource allocation are government activities that have led to expenditures greater than revenue.

The commission was mandated to evaluate proposals for reducing the three major subsidies (i.e. food, fertilizer and oil).

The commission submitted the report in December 2015.
