= Murielle Bochud =

Swiss physician

- Education: Case University; University of Lausanne
- Scientific career
- Workplaces: Lausanne University Hospital; Unisanté
- Thesis: Appropriateness of gastroscopy : gastro-esophageal reflux disease and Barrett's esophagus (2002)

Murielle Bochud is a Swiss physician. She is co-chief of the Department of Epidemiology and Health Systems at the University Centre for Primary Care and Public Health (Unisanté) in Lausanne. Her research considers the epidemiology of cardio-metabolic diseases and genetic epidemiology.

== Early life and education ==
Bochud attended the College Du Sud, a high school in Switzerland. She completed her training in medicine in 1994. After earning her medical degree, Bochud joined Médecins Sans Frontières, and completed humanitarian missions in Burundi and Tanzania. She eventually returned to Switzerland, where she worked as a hospital doctor in Solothurn. She worked toward a doctoral degree in medicine at the University of Lausanne, and earned a PhD at Case University.

== Research and career ==
In 1997, Bochud was appointed to the clinical team at the Lausanne University Hospital. She was eventually made Deputy Director of the University of Lausanne Institute of Social and Preventive Medicine in 2017. In 2019, she helped to construct the Department of Epidemiology and Health Systems, where she was made Co-Chief in August 2022. She is concerned about the relationship between cardiovascular disease, diabetes and spending too much time in front of a television screen.

During the pandemic, Bochud provided public health advice on how to avoid COVID-19.

== Selected publications ==
- Murielle Bochud; Jürg Nussberger; Pascal Bovet; Marc R Maillard; Robert C Elston; Fred Paccaud; Conrad Shamlaye; Michel Burnier (19 June 2006). "Plasma aldosterone is independently associated with the metabolic syndrome". Hypertension. 48 (2): 239–245. doi:10.1161/01.hyp.0000231338.41548.fc. ISSN 0194-911X. PMID 16785327. Wikidata Q51496145.
- Angeline Chatelan; Murielle Bochud; Katherine L Frohlich (1 April 2019). "Precision nutrition: hype or hope for public health interventions to reduce obesity?". International Journal of Epidemiology. 48 (2): 332–342. doi:10.1093/ije/dyy274. ISSN 0300-5771. PMC 6469305. PMID 30544190. Wikidata Q62492380.
- Helen R Warren; Evangelos Evangelou; Claudia P Cabrera; et al. (30 January 2017). "Genome-wide association analysis identifies novel blood pressure loci and offers biological insights into cardiovascular risk". Nature Genetics. 49 (3): 403–415. doi:10.1038/ng.3768. ISSN 1061-4036. PMC 5972004. PMID 28135244. Wikidata Q38764367. (erratum)
