= Rosemonde Pierre-Louis =

Haitian-American activist

- Education: Tufts University; Case Western University
- Occupations: Activist, educator and attorney
- Employer(s): Fordham University School of Law; New York University
- Organization(s): The Haitian Roundtable; New York Women's Foundation
- Known for: co-founding The Haitian Roundtable
- Awards: Ellis Island Medal of Honor; YWCA NYC Community Leadership Award; Louis J. Lefkowitz Award

Rosemonde Alexandria Pierre-Louis is a Haitian-American activist, educator and attorney for women's and immigrant rights. She is co-founder of The Haitian Roundtable and has worked at Fordham University School of Law and New York University's McSilver Institute for Poverty Policy and Research.

== Career ==
Pierre-Louis is of Haitian descent. She studied a bachelor's degree in political science at Tufts University in Medford and Somerville, Massachusetts and a law degree at the Case Western University's School of Law in Cleveland, Ohio.

Pierre-Louis worked as an adjunct professor at Fordham University School of Law in Manhattan, New York, for six years from 1998 to 2005.

In 2010, after an earthquake hit Haiti, Pierre-Louis was appointed by Hillary Clinton as a United States representative at the United Nations Haiti Donor Pre-Conference in Martinique, West Indies.

In 2014, Pierre-Louis was director of general litigation at Harlem Legal Services. She was the senior adviser to the NYC Commission on Gender Equity (CGE) from 2014 to 2016.

In February 2017, Pierre-Louis was appointed as deputy director for administration and external affairs at New York University's McSilver Institute for Poverty Policy and Research. In 2022, she was promoted to executive director.

Pierre-Louise has also served as the vice-chair of the Board of Directors of the New York Women's Foundation in New York City and as co-chair of the African-American Task Force on Violence Against Women.
