= Francois Boller =

French-American clinical professor of neurology

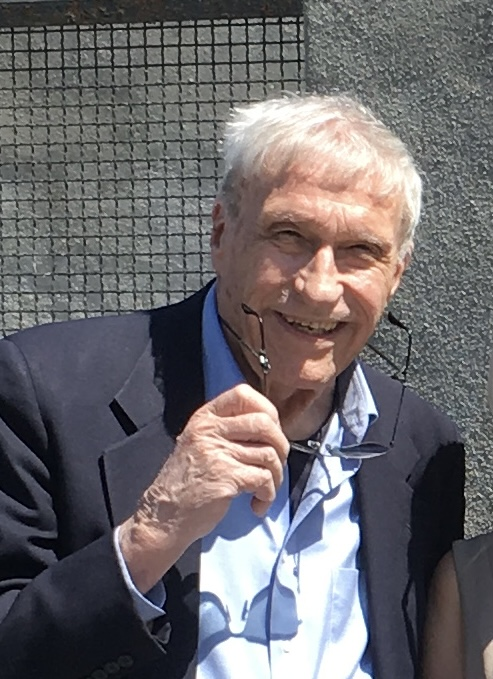
Dr. François Boller, 2018

Francois Boller, born in Montreux, Switzerland in 1938, is a French-American clinical professor of neurology in the Department of Neurology at George Washington University in Washington D.C. currently living and working in Paris, France as a co-series-editor of the Handbook of Clinical Neurology(edited by Elsevier). He is the founder and former Director of the Alzheimer Disease Research Centre (ADRC) in Pittsburgh, Pennsylvania. In 1993 he co-founded the European Journal of Neurology with Professor Per Soel Sorensen, the official journal of the European Academy of Neurology, which he co-edited until 2007.

In 2004 he received the Ottorino Rossi Award, for his valuable contribution to understanding hitherto hidden aspects of brain-behavior relationships and for his unrelenting activity as a teacher, editor, and promoter of international endeavors in the fields of neurology and neuropsychology. His career has led him to several countries; Italy, France, and the United States. Throughout his itinerary he succeeded in maintaining a very coherent approach to his research. Some of the topics he chose to investigate include focal brain damaged patients - particularly aphasia – diffuse brain damaged patients, cognitive impairment and aging people.

== Early life and education ==
Boller was born from the union of Italian Erminia Martini, and French-Swiss musician Carlo Boller. He spent his first years in Montreux, before moving to Cremona, Italy at 14 years old. There he studied at the Liceo Classico Daniele Manin. After graduating he went to study in Bologna, at the Faculty of Medicine. In 1960 he moved to Pisa to continue his medical studies, where he also worked at the Institute of Physiology directed by Professor Giuseppe Moruzzi. After graduating from the University of Pisa in 1963 with an MD degree, he moved to Milan. There he worked at the Clinical Neurology Institute, under Professor Ennio De Renzi and completed his specialization in neurology.

== Scientific career ==
In 1966 he joined the Department of Neurology of Boston University School of Medicine, under the direction of Professor Norman Geschwind. He completed his residency and obtained a fellowship there in 1970. In 1972 he left to work in the Department of Neurology of Case Western Reserve University in Cleveland directed by Joseph Foley. In 1977 he spent a sabbatical year in Paris, where he worked at the INSERM Unit (Institut National de la Santé et de la Recherche Médicale), directed by Henry Hécaen. In 1979 he moved to Pittsburgh, where he was appointed Professor of Neurology and Psychiatry at the University of Pittsburgh. In parallel, he completed his PhD doctorate at the Case Western Reserve University Cleveland in 1982. In 1985 he founded the University of Pittsburgh's Alzheimer Disease Research Centre (ADRC).

In 1989 he moved to Paris as Research Director at Inserm. There, he founded a Research Unit dedicated to neurology and neuropsychology of cerebral aging, which he directed until 2005. In 2005 he returned to the United States, working first at the National Institutes of Health (Bethesda, Maryland) until 2013. Then he transferred to George Washington University, under the title of Clinical Professor of Neurology.

In 2017 he moved back to Paris, where he is currently working and living.

== Selected publications ==
Extended content
- Boller, F; Vignolo, LA (December 1966). "Latent sensory aphasia in hemisphere-damaged patients: an experimental study with the Token Test". Brain. 89 (4): 815–30. doi:10.1093/brain/89.4.815. PMID 5335067.
- Boller, F; Segarra, JM (1969). "Spino-Pontine degeneration". European Neurology. 2 (6): 356–373. doi:10.1159/000113812. PMID 5808476.
- Boller, F; Patten, DH.; Howes, D (1973). "Correlation of brain-scan results with neuropathological findings". Lancet. 1 (7813): 1143–1146. doi:10.1016/s0140-6736(73)91145-8. PMID 4123538.
- Gardner, H; Boller, F; Moreines, J; Butters, N (1973). "Retrieving information from Korsakoff patients". Cortex. 9 (2): 165–175. doi:10.1016/s0010-9452(73)80025-5. PMID 4744361.
- Howes, D; Boller, F (1975). "Simple reaction time: Evidence for focal impairment from lesions of the right hemisphere". Brain. 98 (2): 313–329. doi:10.1093/brain/98.2.317. PMID 1148823.
- Ferguson, JH; Boller, F (1977). "A different form of agraphia: syntactic writing errors in patients with motor speech and movement disorders". Brain Lang. 4 (3): 382–9. doi:10.1016/0093-934x(77)90032-3. PMID 907876.
- Boller, F; Hécaen, H (1979). "L'évaluation des fonctions neuropsychologiques: Examen standard de l'Unité de Recherches Neuropsychologiques et Neurolinguistiques (U 111 INSERM)". Revue de Psychologie Appliquée. 29: 247–266.
- Boller, F; Mizutani, T; Roessmann, U; Gambetti, PL (1980). "Parkinson disease, dementia and Alzheimer disease: Clinico-pathological correlations". Annals of Neurology. 7 (4): 329–335. doi:10.1002/ana.410070408. PMID 7377758.
- Grafman, J; Passafiume, D; Faglioni, P; Boller, F (1982). "Calculation disturbances in adults with focal hemispheric damage". Cortex. 18 (1): 37–49. doi:10.1016/s0010-9452(82)80017-8. PMID 6197234.
- Zubenko, G; Cohen, BM; Boller, F; Malinako, I; Keefe, NC; Chojnacki, B (1987). "Platelet membrane abnormality in Alzheimer's disease". Annals of Neurology. 22 (2): 237–244. doi:10.1002/ana.410220208. PMID 3662454.
- El Awar, M; Becker, JT; Hammond, KM; Boller, F (1987). "Leaming deficits in Parkinson's disease: comparison with Alzheimer's disease and normal aging". Archives of Neurology. 44 (2): 180–184. doi:10.1001/archneur.1987.00520140048016. PMID 3813934.
- Zubenko, GS; Wusylko, M; Boller, F; Cohen, BM; Teply, I (1987). "Family study of platelet membrane fluidity in Alzheimer's disease". Science. 238 (4826): 539–542. Bibcode:1987Sci...238..539Z. doi:10.1126/science.3659926. PMID 3659926.
- Banks, G; Short, P; Martinez, J; Ratcliff, G; Latchaw, R; Boller, F (1989). "The alien hand syndrome". Archives of Neurology. 46 (4): 456–459. doi:10.1001/archneur.1989.00520400116030. PMID 2705906.
- Boller, F; Lopez, OL; Moossy, J (1989). "Diagnosis of dementia: Clinicopathologic correlations". Neurology. 39 (1): 76–79. doi:10.1212/wnl.39.1.76. PMID 2642615.
- Forette, F; Henry, JF; Orgogozo, JM; Pere, JF; Hugonot, L; Israel, L; Loria, Y; Goulley, F; Lallemand, A; Boller, F (1989). "The reliability of clinical criteria for the diagnosis of dementia: A longitudinal multicentric study". Archives of Neurology. 46 (6): 646–648. doi:10.1001/archneur.1989.00520420066024. PMID 2658924.
- Boller, F; Holland, A; Forbes, M; Hood, P; McGonigle-Gibson, K; Becker, JT (1991). "Predictors of decline in Alzheimer's disease". Cortex. 27 (1): 9–17. doi:10.1016/s0010-9452(13)80264-x. PMID 2055046.
- Saxton, J; Mc Gonigle-Gibson, K; Swihart, A; Miller, M; Boller, F (1990). "Assessment of the severely impaired patient: description and validation of a new neuropsychological Test Battery". Psychological Assessment: A Journal of Consulting and Clinical Psychology. 2 (3): 298–303. doi:10.1037/1040-3590.2.3.298.
- Cuénod, CA; Denys, A; Michot, JL; Jehenson, P; Forette, F; Kaplan, D; Syrota, A; Boller, F (1993). "Amygdala atrophy in Alzheimer's disease. An in vivo magnetic resonance imaging study". Arch Neurol. 50 (9): 941–5. doi:10.1001/archneur.1993.00540090046009. PMID 8363448.
- Cuénod, CA; Kaplan, DB; Michot, JL; Jehenson, P; Leroy-Willig, A; Forette, F; Syrota, A; Boller, F (1995). "Phospholipid abnormalities in early Alzheimer's disease. In vivo phosphorus 31 magnetic resonance spectroscopy". Arch Neurol. 52 (1): 89–94. doi:10.1001/archneur.1995.00540250097018. PMID 7826281.
- Parlato, V; Lese, GB; Dabaj, A; Forette, F; Boller, F (1995). "Survival in institutionalized patients. Influence of dementia and loss of functional capacities". Arch Neurol. 52 (5): 469–76. doi:10.1001/archneur.1995.00540290057018. PMID 7733841.
- Boller, François; Traykov, Latchezar; Dao-Castellana, Marie-Hélène; Fontaine-Dabernard, Anne; Zilbovicius, Monica; Rancurel, Gerald; Pappatà, Sabina; Samson, Yves (1995). "Cognitive Functioning in "Diffuse" Pathology". Annals of the New York Academy of Sciences. 769 (1): 23–40. Bibcode:1995NYASA.769...23B. doi:10.1111/j.1749-6632.1995.tb38129.x. PMID 8595028.
- Dhenain, M; Michot, JL; Volk, A; Picq, JL; Boller, F (1997). "T2-weighted MRI studies of mouse lemurs: a primate model of brain aging". Neurobiol Aging. 18 (5): 517–21. doi:10.1016/s0197-4580(97)00105-x. PMID 9390778.
- Boller, F; Forbes, MA (1998). "History of dementia and dementia in history: an overview". Journal of the Neurological Sciences. 158 (2): 125–133. doi:10.1016/S0022-510X(98)00128-2. PMID 9702682.
- Boller, F (1999). "History of the International Neuropsychological Symposium: a reflection of the evolution of a discipline". Neuropsychologia. 37 (1): 17–26. doi:10.1016/s0028-3932(98)00069-4. PMID 9920467.
- Tzortzis, C; Goldblum, MC; Dang, M; Forette, F; Boller, F (2000). "Absence of amusia and preserved naming of musical instruments in an aphasic composer". Cortex. 36 (2): 227–42. doi:10.1016/s0010-9452(08)70526-4. PMID 10815708.
- Amaducci, L; Grassi, E; Boller, F (January 2002). "Maurice Ravel and right-hemisphere musical creativity: influence of disease on his last musical works?". Eur. J. Neurol. 9 (1): 75–82. doi:10.1046/j.1468-1331.2002.00351.x. PMID 11784380.
- Boller, F; Dalla Barba, G (2001). "Neuropsychological tests in Alzheimer's disease". Aging (Milano). 13 (3): 210–20. doi:10.1007/BF03351479. PMID 11442303.
- Boller, F; Verny, M; Hugonot, L; Saxton, J (2002). "Clinical features of severe dementia. A review". European Journal of Neurology. 9 (2): 125–136. doi:10.1046/j.1468-1331.2002.00356.x. PMID 11882053.
- Boller, F; El Massioui, F; Devouche, E; Traykov, L; Pomati, S; Starkstein, SE (2002). "Processing emotional information in Alzheimer's disease: effects on memory performance and neurophysiological correlates". Dement Geriatr Cogn Disord. 14 (2): 104–12. doi:10.1159/000064932. PMID 12145458.
- Traykov, L; Rigaud, AS; Baudic, S; Smagghe, A; Boller, F; Forette, F (2002). "Apolipoprotein E epsilon 4 allele frequency in demented and cognitively impaired patients with and without cerebrovascular disease". J Neurol Sci. 203–204: 177–81. doi:10.1016/s0022-510x(02)00287-3. PMID 12417380.
- Boller, F (2004). "Rational basis of rehabilitation following cerebral lesions: a review of the concept of cerebral plasticity". Funct Neurol. 19 (2): 65–72. PMID 15274513.
- Oliveira, JR; Spiteri, E; Sobrido, MJ; et al. (December 2004). "Genetic heterogeneity in familial idiopathic basal ganglia calcification (Fahr disease)". Neurology. 63 (11): 2165–7. doi:10.1212/01.WNL.0000145601.88274.88. PMID 15596772.
- Hugonot-Diener, L; Verny, M; Devouche, E; Saxton, J; Mecocci, P; Boller, F (2003). "[Abridged version of the severe impairment battery (SIB)]". Psychol Neuropsychiatr Vieil. 1 (4): 273–83. PMID 15683963.
- Starkstein, SE; Boller, F; Garau, L (2005). "A two-year follow-up study of remote memory in Alzheimer's disease". J Neuropsychiatry Clin Neurosci. 17 (3): 336–41. doi:10.1176/jnp.17.3.336. PMID 16179655.
- Saxton, J; Kastango, KB; Hugonot-Diener, L; Boller, F; Verny, M; Sarles, CE; Girgis, RR; Devouche, E; Mecocci, P; Pollock, BG; DeKosky, ST (2005). "Development of a short form of the Severe Impairment Battery". Am J Geriatr Psychiatry. 13 (11): 999–1005. doi:10.1176/appi.ajgp.13.11.999. PMID 16286444.
- Boller, F (December 2005). "Modern neuropsychology in France: Jean Lhermitte (1877–1959)". Cortex. 41 (6): 740–1. doi:10.1016/s0010-9452(08)70292-2. PMID 16350656.
- Boller, F; Sinforiani, E; Mazzucchi, A (2005). "Preserved painting abilities after a stroke. The case of Paul-Elie Gernez". Funct Neurol. 20 (4): 151–5. PMID 16483452.
- Boller (January 2006). "Théophile Alajouanine (1890–1980)". Cortex. 42 (1): 3–4. doi:10.1016/S0010-9452(08)70315-0. PMID 16509102.
- Traykov, L; Rigaud, AS; Cesaro, P; Boller, F (2007). "[Neuropsychological impairment in the early Alzheimer's disease]". Encephale. 33 (3 Pt 1): 310–6. doi:10.1016/s0013-7006(07)92044-8. PMID 17675928.
- Boller, F; Bick, K; Duyckaerts, C (May 2007). "They have shaped Alzheimer disease: the protagonists, well known and less well known". Cortex. 43 (4): 565–9. doi:10.1016/s0010-9452(08)70251-x. PMID 17624003.
- Boller F. "International neurology meeting in 1929. J Hist Neurosci 2011; 20::379-80.
- Tatu, L; Bogousslavsky, J; Boller, F (2014). "Phantoms in artists: the lost limbs of Blaise Cendrars, Arthur Rimbaud, and Paul Wittgenstein". J Hist Neurosci. 23 (4): 355–66. doi:10.1080/0964704X.2014.881168. PMID 24956238.
- Román, GC; Boller, F (2014). "Vascular factors in neurodegenerative diseases: a path towards treatment and prevention". Funct Neurol. 29 (2): 85–6. PMC 4198164. PMID 25306117.
- Aminoff, M.; Boller, F.; Swaab, D. F. (2014). ""Letter to the Editor: Comment on Koehler and Stahnisch's (2014) "Three Twentieth-Century Multiauthored Neurological Handbooks". Journal of the History of the Neurosciences. 23 (4): 420–421. doi:10.1080/0964704X.2014.950531. PMID 25317491.
- Boller, F G Dalla Barba - The evolution of Psychiatry and Neurology: Two disciplines divided by a common goal? Psychiatry for neurologists, 2006 – Springer doi:10.1007/978-1-59259-960-8_2
- Vallar, G; Boller, F; Grossi, D; Gainotti, G (2015). "Italian neuropsychology in the second half of the twentieth century". Neurol Sci. 36 (3): 361–70. doi:10.1007/s10072-014-2044-6. PMID 25527368.
- Boller, F; Bogousslavsky, J (2015). "Paul Wittgenstein's right arm and his phantom: the saga of a famous concert pianist and his amputation". Prog Brain Res. 216: 293–303. doi:10.1016/bs.pbr.2014.11.011. PMID 25684295.
- Legati, A; Giovannini, D; Nicolas, G; López-Sánchez, U; Quintáns, B; Oliveira, JR; Sears, RL; Ramos, EM; Spiteri, E; Sobrido, MJ; Carracedo, Á; Castro-Fernández, C; Cubizolle, S; Fogel, BL; Goizet, C; Jen, JC; Kirdlarp, S; Lang, AE; Miedzybrodzka, Z; Mitarnun, W; Paucar, M; Paulson, H; Pariente, J; Richard, AC; Salins, NS; Simpson, SA; Striano, P; Svenningsson, P; Tison, F; Unni, VK; Vanakker, O; Wessels, MW; Wetchaphanphesat, S; Yang, M; Boller, F; Campion, D; Hannequin, D; Sitbon, M; Geschwind, DH; Battini, JL; Coppola, G (2015). "Mutations in XPR1 cause primary familial brain calcification associated with altered phosphate export". Nat Genet. 47 (6): 579–81. doi:10.1038/ng.3289. PMC 4516721. PMID 25938945.
- Boller, F (2015). "Ennio De Renzi (1924-2014). A loving remembrance". Funct Neurol. 30 (1): 5–7. PMC 4520672. PMID 26214022.
- Boller, F; Agrawal, K; Romano, A (2015). "Sexual function after strokes". Neurology of Sexual and Bladder Disorders. Handbook of Clinical Neurology. Vol. 130. pp. 289–95. doi:10.1016/B978-0-444-63247-0.00016-X. ISBN 978-0-444-63247-0. PMID 26003250.
- Boller, F; Birnbaum, D (2016). "Silas Weir Mitchell: Neurologists and Neurology during the American Civil War". Front Neurol Neurosci. Frontiers of Neurology and Neuroscience. 38: 93–106. doi:10.1159/000442596. ISBN 978-3-318-05605-1. PMID 27035676.
- Sharma, A; Boller, F; Koubeissi, M (2016). "Women with epilepsy". Funct Neurol. 31 (3): 125–6. doi:10.11138/fneur/2016.31.3.125. PMC 5115225. PMID 27678204.
- Piechowski-Jozwiak B, Boller F, Bogousslavsky J.Universal Connection through Art: Role of Mirror Neurons in Art Production and Reception. Behav Sci. 2017 May 5;7(2). Piechowski-Jozwiak, B; Boller, F; Bogousslavsky, J (2017). "Universal Connection through Art: Role of Mirror Neurons in Art Production and Reception". Behav Sci. 7 (2): 29. doi:10.3390/bs7020029. PMC 5485459. PMID 28475130.
- D'Angelo, E; Boller, F; Wheeler-Kingshott, CG; Vanacore, N; Sandrini, G; Cisari, C; Tamburin, S; Baricich, A (2017). "The past and future of Functional Neurology". Funct Neurol. 32 (2): 61. doi:10.11138/fneur/2017.32.2.061. PMC 5507153. PMID 28676137.
- Boller, F; Caputi, N (2018). "Thomas Mann's depiction of neurosyphilis and other diseases". J Hist Neurosci. 27 (1): 1–9. doi:10.1080/0964704X.2017.1315288. PMID 28471291.
- Boller, F; Birnbaum, DS; Caputi, N (2018). "Charles Bonnet Syndrome and Other Hallucinatory Phenomena". Front Neurol Neurosci. Frontiers of Neurology and Neuroscience. 41: 117–124. doi:10.1159/000475702. ISBN 978-3-318-05858-1. PMID 29145190.
- Caputi, N; Birnbaum, D; Boller, F (2018). "Thomas Mann and Neurology". Front Neurol Neurosci. Frontiers of Neurology and Neuroscience. 43: 76–84. doi:10.1159/000490406. ISBN 978-3-318-06393-6. PMID 30336458.
- Boller, F; Caputi, N (2018). "History of the frontal lobes. Language and language disorders". Revue Neurologique. 174 (10): 739. doi:10.1016/j.neurol.2018.09.006.
- Boller, F; Caputi, N; Romano, A; Kaminski, H; Broussolle, E (2019). "Transatlantic Crossings: Early neurological exchanges between USA and France". Rev Neurol (Paris). 175 (5): 291–297. doi:10.1016/j.neurol.2018.09.018. PMID 30902429.
- Bogousslavsky J, Boller F, Iwata M A History of Neuropsychology and Behavioral Neurology Front Neurol Neurosci.2019 ISBN 978-3-318-06462-9, 978-3-318-06463-6 doi:10.1159/isbn.978-3-318-06463-6
- Walusinski, O; Boller, F; Henderson, VW (2019). "Shining a Light on Some of the Most Famous 19th and 20th Century's Neuropsychologists". Front Neurol Neurosci. Frontiers of Neurology and Neuroscience. 44: 192–229. doi:10.1159/000494964. ISBN 978-3-318-06462-9. PMID 31220830.
- Cárdenas, VM; Boller, F; Román, GC (2019). "Helicobacter pylori, Vascular Risk Factors and Cognition in U.S. Older Adults". Brain Sci. 9 (12): 370. doi:10.3390/brainsci9120370. PMC 6955675. PMID 31842501.
- Meira, AT; Pedroso, JL; Boller, F; Franklin, GL; Barsottini, OGP; Teive, HAG (2020). "Reconstructing the History of Machado-Joseph Disease". Eur Neurol. 83 (1): 99–104. doi:10.1159/000507191. PMID 32344416.
- Boller F, Caputi N Effets du vieillissement et des lésions cérébrales chez les artistes (Effects of ageing and brain damage in artists) Histoire des Sciences Médicales 2023 (55 389-402)
- Boller, F; Petrov, A; Sørensen, PS (2024). "Early history of the European Journal of Neurology. A mirror of the evolution of Europe after 1989". Eur J Neurol. 31 (11) e16236. doi:10.1111/ene.16236. PMC 11464384. PMID 38379392.
- Boller, F. Caputi, N., and Finger, S. Les apports d'Hippocrate et du monde grec à la neurologie et la neuropsychologie [The contributions of Hippocrates and the Greek World to neurology and neuropsychology]. Histoire des Sciences Médicales. 2024 6 : 365-374.
- Broussolle, E; Reynolds, EH; Koehler, PJ; Bogousslavsky, J; Walusinski, O; Brigo, F; Lorusso, L; Boller, F (2025). "Charcot's international visitors and pupils from Europe, the United States, and Russia". J Hist Neurosci. 34 (2): 206–247. doi:10.1080/0964704X.2024.2350921. PMID 38921955.
- Boller, F; Bogousslavsky, J (2025). "Charcot as a collector and critic of the arts: Relationship of the 'founder of neurology' with various aspects of art". J Hist Neurosci. 34 (2): 310–321. doi:10.1080/0964704X.2024.2439234. PMID 39805568.

=== Books and book chapters ===
- Boller F, Segarra JM: Spino-Pontine Degeneration. Handbook of Clinical Neurology, PJ Vinken and JW Bruyn, Eds. North Holland, Amsterdam, Vol 21, Chap. 18, 389-402,1975.
- Boller F, Frank E: Sexual Dysfunctions of Neurologically Handicapped Adults: Diagnosis, management and rehabilitation. Raven Press, New York, 1982. ISBN 978-0-89004-500-8
- Boller F, Katzman R, Rascol A, Signoret JL, Christen Y (Eds): Biological Markers of Alzheimer's Disease. Research and Perspectives in Alzheimer's Disease. Berlin, Springer Verlag, 1989. ISBN 978-3-540-51669-9
- Boller, F. Forette, F. Khatchaturian, Z. Christen, Y: Heterogeneity of Alzheimer's disease. Research and Perspectives in Alzheimer's Disease. Berlin, Springer Verlag, 1992. ISBN 978-0-387-55918-6
- Boller, F, Duyckaerts, C: Alzheimer's disease: clinical and anatomic aspects. In: Behavioral Neurology and Neuropsychology. Feinberg, T & Farah, M, (Eds). New York, McGrawHill, 1583-1622, 1996. ISBN 978-0-07-137432-3
- Boller, F. and S. Muggia (1999). Non-Alzheimer dementias. Handbook of clinical and experimental neuropsychology. G. Denes and G. Pizzamiglio. Hove, Psychology Press.: 437-438. ISBN 978-1-315-79127-2 doi:10.4324/9781315791272
- Forette F, Christen, Y Boller F. La maladie d'Alzheimer: Prédiction, prévention, prise en charge FNG Paris, 2000. ISBN 978-2-902499-10-6
- Boller F, Christen Y, Forette F: Les Frontières de l'Alzheimer. FNG Paris, 2002
- Boller, F. and S. Suarez (2004). The neuropsychology of infectious and inflammatory brain disorders. Oxford Handbook of Clinical Neuropychology. P. Halligan.(Ed) Oxford.
- Bogousslavsky, J and F. Boller (2005). Neurological Disorders in Famous Artists. Karger, Basel. doi:10.1159/isbn.978-3-318-01206-4
- 3 chapters in Vol 6 of the Handbook of Neuropsychology, 2nd Edition, 2001 ISBN 978-0-444-50372-5
  - Pathological correlates of dementia C. Duyckaerts and F. Boller
  - Cognitive deficits and dementia in Parkinson's disease B. Pillon, F. Boller, R. Levy and B. Dubois
  - Severe dementia and its evaluation: scales for cognition, behavior and overall functioning M. Verny, L. Hugonot-Diener, F. Boller.
- Clarac, F; Boller, F (2010). "Chapter 40 History of neurology in France". History of Neurology. Handbook of Clinical Neurology. Vol. 95. pp. 629–56. doi:10.1016/S0072-9752(08)02140-4. ISBN 978-0-444-52009-8. PMID 19892143.
- Basso, A; Forbes, M; Boller, F (2013). "Rehabilitation of aphasia". Neurological Rehabilitation. Handbook of Clinical Neurology. Vol. 110. pp. 325–34. doi:10.1016/B978-0-444-52901-5.00027-7. ISBN 978-0-444-52901-5. PMID 23312652.
- Mazzucchi, A; Sinforiani, E; Boller, F (2013). "Focal cerebral lesions and painting abilities". The Fine Arts, Neurology, and Neuroscience - New Discoveries and Changing Landscapes. Progress in Brain Research. Vol. 204. pp. 71–98. doi:10.1016/B978-0-444-63287-6.00004-X. ISBN 978-0-444-63287-6. PMID 24041319.
- Mazzucchi, A; Sinforiani, E; Boller, F (2013). "Artistic creativity, artistic production, and aging". The Fine Arts, Neurology, and Neuroscience - New Discoveries and Changing Landscapes. Progress in Brain Research. Vol. 204. pp. 45–69. doi:10.1016/B978-0-444-63287-6.00003-8. ISBN 978-0-444-63287-6. PMID 24041318.
- Bogousslavsky J, Boller F. Jean-Martin Charcot and art: relationship of the "founder of neurology" with various aspects of art. Prog Brain Res. 2013; 203:185-99. doi:10.1016/B978-0-444-62730-8.00007-4
- Finger S, Zaidel DW, Boller F, Bogousslavsky, J The Fine Arts, Neurology and Neuroscience. History and Modern Perspectives: Neuro-Historical Dimensions. Progress in Brain Research 2013; 203, Elsevier. doi:10.1016/B978-0-444-62730-8.09985-0
- Finger S, Zaidel DW, Boller F, Bogousslavsky, J The Fine Arts, Neurology and Neuroscience. History and Modern Perspectives: New discoveries and changing landscapes. Progress in Brain Research 2013; 204, Elsevier. eBook ISBN 978-0-444-63288-3
- Finger S, Stiles A, Boller F, Literature, Neurology and Neuroscience. History and Modern Perspectives: Progress in Brain Research ,2013; 205 Elsevier. eBook ISBN 978-0-444-63275-3
- Finger S, Stiles A, Boller F, Literature, Neurology and Neuroscience. Neurological and Psychiatric Disorders: Progress in Brain Research ,2013; 206 Elsevier. eBook ISBN 978-0-444-63387-3
- Finger S, Altenmueller E, Boller F, Music, Neurology and Neuroscience. History and Modern Perspectives: Progress in Brain Research, Elsevier, 216,217 2015 eBook ISBN 978-0-444-63410-8
- Boller F, Forbes, M, Bogousslavsky J: Paul Wittgenstein's right arm and his Phantom Tale of an amputated pianist In: Finger S, Altenmueller E, Boller F, Music, Neurology and Neuroscience. History and Modern Perspectives: Progress in Brain Research, Elsevier, PMID 25684295
- Bogousslavsky J, Boller F, Iwata M A History of Neuropsychology and Behavioral Neurology Front Neurol Neurosci.2019 ISBN 978-3-318-06463-6
- Aminoff, M, Boller F, Swaab D Handbook of Clinical Neurology | Elsevier ISSN 0072-9752 This is the continuation of the series started by P Vinken and GW Bruyn. So far, 46 volumes of the new series have been published and around 20 are in various stages of preparation.
- Volume 161. Clinical Neurophysiology: Diseases and Disorders, Part II Published: 15 April 2019 Series Volume Editors: Kerry Levin Patrick Chauvel doi:10.1016/B978-0-444-64142-7.09999-9
- Volume 160. Clinical Neurophysiology: Basis and Technical Aspects, Part I Published: 1 April 2019 Series Volume Editors: Kerry Levin Patrick Chauvel Hardback ISBN 978-0-444-64032-1, 978-0-444-64033-8
- Volume 159. Balance, Gait, and Falls Published: 18 December 2018 Series Volume Editors: Brian Day Stephen Lord Hardback ISBN 978-0-444-63916-5, 978-0-444-63917-2
- Volume 158. Sports Neurology Published: 18 December 2018 Series Volume Editors: Brian Hainline Robert Stern Hardback ISBN 978-0-444-63954-7, 978-0-444-63955-4
- Volume 157. Thermoregulation Part II Published: 13 December 2018 Series Volume Editor: Andrej A. Romanovsky Hardback ISBN 978-0-444-64074-1, 978-0-444-64075-8
- Volume 156. Thermoregulation Part I Published: 12 December 2018 Series Volume Editor: Andrej A. Romanovsky Hardback ISBN 978-0-444-63912-7, 978-0-444-63913-4
- Volume 154. The Cerebellum: From Embryology to Diagnostic Investigations Published: 26 June 2018 Series Volume Editors: Mario Manto Thierry Huisman ISBN 978-0-444-63956-1
- Volume 155. The Cerebellum: Disorders and Treatment Published: 26 June 2018 Series Volume Editors: Mario Manto Thierry Huisman Hardback ISBN 978-0-444-64189-2, 978-0-444-64190-8
- Volume 153. Human Prion Diseases Published: 26 June 2018 Series Volume Editors: Maurizio Pocchiari Jean Manson ISBN 978-0-444-63945-5
- Volume 152. The Neurology of HIV Infection Published: 17 April 2018 Series Volume Editor: Bruce James Brew PMID 14978148
- Volume 151. The Parietal Lobe Published: 28 March 2018 Series Volume Editors: Giuseppe Vallar H. Branch Coslett Hardback ISBN 978-0-444-63622-5, 978-0-444-63624-9
- Volume 150. Brain Banking Published: 23 March 2018 Series Volume Editors: Ingeborg Huitinga Maree Webster Hardback ISBN 978-0-444-63639-3, 978-0-444-63642-3
- Volume 149. Metastatic Disease of the Nervous System Published: 29 January 2018 Editors: David Schiff M J Van den Bent Hardback ISBN 978-0-12-811161-1, 978-0-444-63879-3
- Volume 148. Neurogenetics, Part II Published: 29 January 2018 Series Volume Editors: Daniel H. Geschwind Henry L. Paulson Christine Klein Hardback ISBN 978-0-444-64076-5, 978-0-444-64077-2
- Volume 147. Neurogenetics, Part I Published: 26 January 2018 Series Volume Editors: Daniel H. Geschwind, Henry L. Paulson, Christine Klein eBook ISBN 978-0-444-63235-7
