= Alfred Wilhelmi =

American endocrinologist

Chair in Biochemistry at Emory University School of Medicine 1950-1978; President, Endocrine Society 1968-1969

Personal details
- Education: Western Reserve University (B.S.), Oxford University (Ph.D., animal phyisology (1937)

Alfred Ellis Wilhelmi (1910–1994) was an American endocrinologist recognized for contributing to the understanding of anterior pituitary hormones.

== Education ==
Born in Lakewood, Ohio, Wilhelmi attended Cleveland public schools. Wilhelmi earned a B.S. degree in premedical sciences from Western Reserve University in 1933. He then attended Oxford University as a Rhodes Scholar, where he obtained a B.A. in 1933 and Ph.D. in animal physiology in 1937. He then joined Yale University's Biochemistry Department, rising to the position of Professor in 1950.

== Career ==
Wilhelmi chaired the Department of Biochemistry at Emory University School of Medicine from 1950 to 1977. In 1960, he was named Charles Howard Candler Professor of Biochemistry. In 1979, he received Emory's Thomas Jefferson award for service to the university and community.

Wilhelmi also was President of the Endocrine Society from 1968 to 1969. During his career, he published over 80 articles in scientific journals.

== The Human Growth Hormone, Creutzfeld Jakob Disease Controversy ==
Wilhelmi was an important researcher involved in harnessing human grown hormone from cadavers in the 1960s and 1970s. Early studies conducted in 1958 by Maurice Raben at Tufts University School of Medicine showed it was possible to cause children with pituitary dwarfism to grow by injecting them with human growth hormone. In 1961, the National Institutes of Health (NIH) formed the National Pituitary Agency to organize collection and redistribution of human endocrine glands to three universities for processing into growth hormone: Emory University, Tufts University and Cornell University. For the first 14 of these years, Wilhelmi supervised the Emory laboratory, which was the largest seat of hormone production.

In 1985, however, two patients who previously had received the exogenous hormone treatment died in the United States. That caused the NIH to suspend the human growth hormone program and launch an investigation. The deaths were attributed to Creutzfeldt–Jakob disease (CJD) transmitted by impurities in the hormone injected into the patients years earlier using the Wilhelmi protocol. As of 2000, there had been 22 CJD deaths among American recipients of unfiltered hormone prior to 1977.
