= David Pedlar =

Canadian researcher

David Pedlar is the Director of Research at the National Headquarters of Veterans Affairs Canada in Charlottetown, Prince Edward Island since 2001. He was a Canada-US Fulbright Scholar, Rotary Foundation Scholar and co-recipient of an International Psychogeriatric Association/Bayer Research Award in Psychogeriatrics. He has recently held university affiliations in Medicine at Dalhousie University and Nursing at the University of Prince Edward Island.

Pedlar has been responsible for over forty research studies on Veteran health and has been an investigator in a number of Canadian Institutes for Health Research (CIHR) funded studies. Pedlar was a co-director of the Prince Edward Island study centre in two waves of the Canadian Study of Health and Aging. He conducts applied research, publishes and speaks on topics in the fields of military and veteran health, as well as continuing care for seniors.
