= Peter Tippett =

American physician, researcher, and inventor (born 1953)

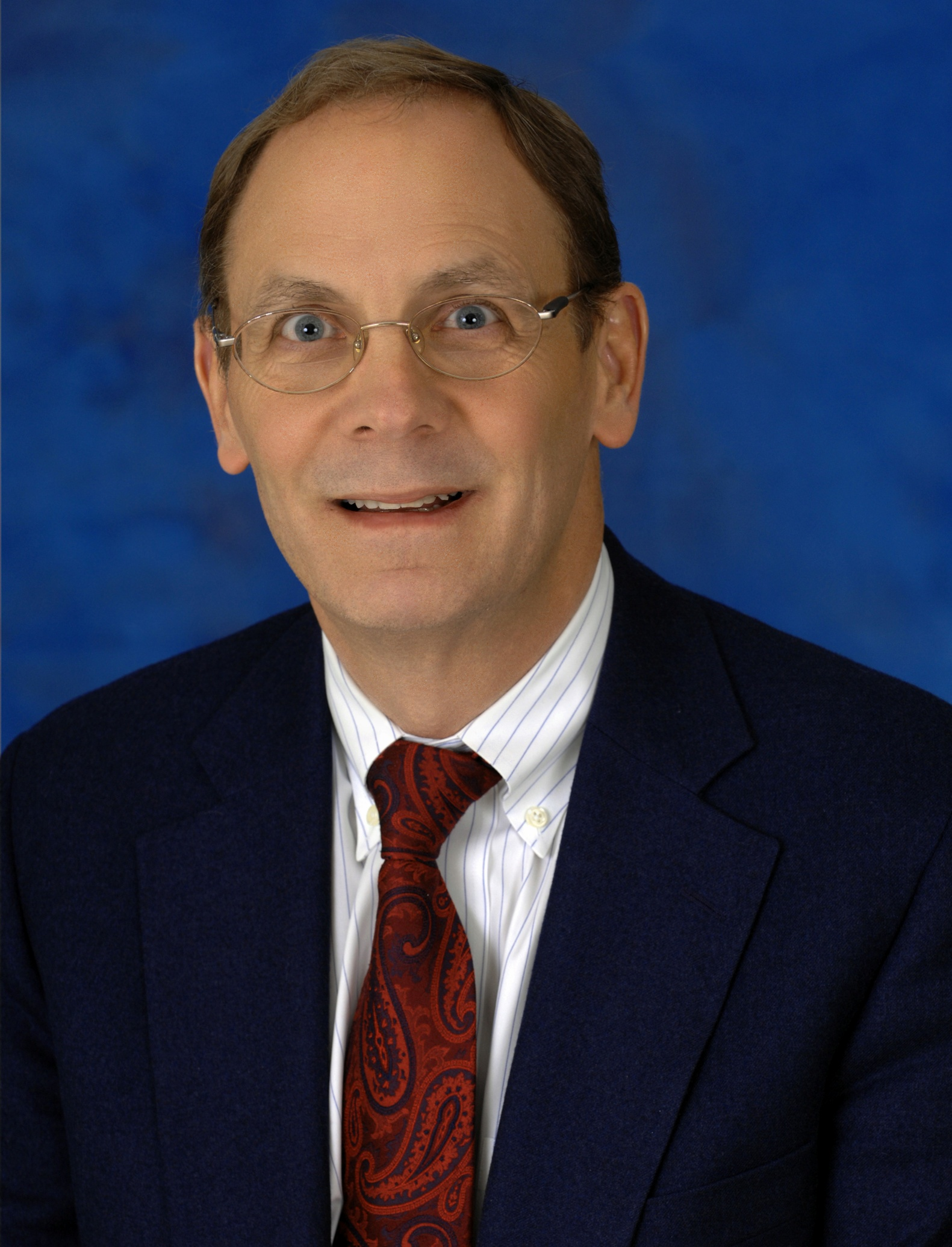
- Born: Peter S. Tippett; 1953 (age 72–73); Dearborn, Michigan, U.S.
- Education: Kalamazoo College, B.A., Biology (1975); Rockefeller University, Research Assistant to Nobel Prize winner Robert Bruce Merrifield (1975-1976); Case Western Reserve University, Ph.D. in Biochemistry (1981); Case Western Reserve University, Doctor of Medicine (1983); American Board of Internal Medicine, Diplomate Certified, Internal Medicine (1987)
- Medical career
- Profession: Medicine
- Field: Internal Medicine
- Institutions: Case Western Reserve University Department of Biochemistry; The Pacific Foundation for the Advancement of Science and Medicine; Cleveland Metropolitan General Hospital; Euclid Hospital; Daniel Freeman Marina Hospital
- Sub-specialties: Biochemistry
- Research: Solid Phase Peptide Synthesis of Immunoglobulin Hypervariable Regions; Synthesis of Smallest Active Complement Peptides from C3 and C5; Hepatic Glucokinase -- Kinetics, Regulation, and Turnover; Palmitoyl CoA's Role as a Metabolic Effector; Protein-lipid Interactions; Measurement of Critical Micelle Concentrations; Hypomagnesemia, Meperidine Related Seizures in Renal Failure; Cardiologic Effect of Heat Stroke.

Peter S. Tippett (born 1953) is an American physician, researcher, and inventor known for contributions to information security, clinical medicine, and technology. These contributions include the development of the anti-virus program "Corporate Vaccine." Tippett was Vice President of Verizon's Innovations Incubator and Chief Medical Officer for Verizon Enterprise Services from 2009 to 2015. He is currently the Founder and CEO of careMESH Inc.

== Early life and education ==
Born in 1953 and raised in Dearborn, Michigan, Tippett is an alumnus of Kalamazoo College and holds a Ph.D. and M.D. from Case Western Reserve University School of Medicine. He studied at the Rockefeller University in New York under Nobel Prize winner Robert Bruce Merrifield, directing his doctoral research efforts toward the metabolic indicators of peptide synthesis. He completed his internship and residency in Internal Medicine at Cleveland Metropolitan General Hospital, and spent 1975-1985 engaged in biochemical research.

== Work history ==
While researching at Case Western Reserve, Tippett moonlighted as an emergency room physician and instructor in Emergency and Outpatient Medicine. He spent much of his early clinical career (1989–1995) in Emergency Medicine in Ohio and California. He received his board certification in Internal Medicine in 1987. Between 1993 and 2000, he served on the board of the Computer Ethics Institute.

He served as executive director of The Pacific Foundation for Science and Medicine from 1988 to 1992, an intersection of his clinical career with an emerging focus on technology, particularly cybersecurity, and the use and access protocols of the Internet. It was in his role as president and chairman of Certus International, a publisher and developer of PC anti-virus and security software, that Tippett applied his research insights as a biochemist to the concept of computer "viruses" to develop the anti-virus software, "Vaccine," which was later purchased by Symantec in 1992. His CEO role with Cybertrust led to a merger of Cybertrust by Verizon, and Tippett's role in the Verizon healthcare and security innovations divisions. Tippett served as chairman of the Alliance for Internet Security in 2000. He represented Verizon on the board of directors of The Open Identity Exchange (OIX) and the Information Card Foundation.

== Technological achievements ==
In addition to being credited with the development of one of the first anti-virus programs, "Vaccine", Tippett pioneered and commercialized a string of now-common technologies including what is now called the "Recovery Disk," processor image signatures, using hash-tables for trusted file execution and anomaly detection, aspects of mail merge and "un-do." He ran a bulletin board system for CP/M software before the first IBM PC was created and was president of the Cleveland Osborne Group (a user group for the computers of the Osborne Computer Corporation) in the early 1980s.

As chief scientist for ICSA.net, Tippett was one of a handful of experts to identify and address the ILOVEYOU virus that broke in May 2000 and provided key information to the Department of Justice about David Smith, the writer of the Melissa virus. He was featured on the cover of the August 2000 issue of Time Digital magazine.

== Professional activities ==
Tippett's work in cybersecurity has led to roles as speaker, contributor and advisor to government and private sector organizations. From 2003 to 2005, he served on the President's Information Technology Committee (PITAC), established by Congress in 1997 under the High Performance Computing Act of 1991 to "guide the Administration's efforts to accelerate the development and adoption of information technologies vital for American prosperity in the 21st century."

The U.S. Chamber of Commerce awarded Tippett its first Leadership in Health Care Award at the Chamber's first annual Health Care Summit (2012) for his leadership of Verizon's incubator. Tippett was also Chief Scientist for ICSA Labs and previously served as president of the International Computer Security Association.

Tippett is currently an adjunct professor in the Division of General Medical Sciences at Case Western Reserve University School of Medicine.

In November 2017, T.E.N., a technology and information security executive networking and relationship-marketing firm, announced that Tippett received the 2017 ISE® Luminary Leadership Award.

== Clinical publications ==
- Tippett, P. S. (1975) Structural-Specificity Relationships of the Immunoglobulin Molecule and the Solid Phase Peptide Synthesis of two Antigen-binding Peptides. Archives of Kalamazoo College, Kalamazoo, MI.
- Corporale, L. L H.; Tippett, P. S.; Erickson, B. W.; and Hugli, T. E. (1980) The Active Site of C3a Anaphylatoxin. J. Biol. Chem. 255 10758–10763.
- Tippett, P. S. and Neet, K. E. (1982) Specific Inhibition of Glucokinase by Long Chain Acyl CoAs Belos the Critical Micelle Concentration. J. Biol. Chem. 257, 12839–12845.
- Tippett, P. S. and Neet, K. E. (1982) An Allosteric Model for the Inhibition of Glucokinase by Long Chain Acyl CoA. J. Biol. Chem. 257, 12846–12852
- Tippett, P. S. (1981) Kinetics and Regulation of Rat Liver Glucokinase (Ph.D.). University Microfilms International, Ann Arbor, Mi.
- Tippett, P. S. and Neet, K. E. (1983) Interconversion Between Different Sulfhydryl-Related Kinetic States in Glucokinase. Arch. Biochem. Biophys. 222, 285–289.
- Powell, G. L.; Tippett, P. S.; et al. (1985) Fatty acyl-CoA as an Effector Molecule in Metabolism. Federation Proceedings 44, 81–84.
- Neet, K. E.; Tippett, P. S.; and Keenan, R. P. (1986) Regulatory Properties of Glucokinase, Regulation and Metabolism. Wiley, London.
- Tippett, P. S. (1986) Regulation of Enzymes by Long Chain Acyl CoAs, Fact or Fantasy. Trends in Biochemical Sciences, 11.
