= Clemens Burda =

German-American Chemist

Clemens Burda is a nanomaterials chemist and the Chemical Professor at Case Western Reserve University. He is a fellow of the American Association for the Advancement of Science.

== Education ==
Clemens Burda was born in Germany before emigrating to the United States. He received a diploma in Chemistry from the University of Basel in 1993, submitting a thesis entitled Radical Anions of Polyalkylazulenes: An ESR and ENDOR Study. From 1994 to 1997 he then completed his PhD at Basel, with a dissertation entitled Photoinduced Intramolecular Electron Transfer Studied by Means of Picosecond Laser Spectroscopy. From 1997 to 1998 he completed a postdoctoral position at the School of Chemistry and Biochemistry at Georgia Institute of Technology.

== Career ==
From 1998 to 2001, Burda served as the Associate Director of the Laser Dynamics Laboratory, School of Chemistry and Biochemistry of the Georgia Institute of Technology. In 2001 he was appointed a faculty member at Case Western Reserve University. Near the beginning of his career, he began serving as Co-Director of the Center for Chemical Dynamics in 2003, a year in which he received a NSF Career Grant. That year Popular Mechanics, wrote that Burda has "developed nano-sized titanium dioxide that he says will eat up oil and sewage spills." Beginning in 2005 he also became the Director of the university's Analytical Core Facility for Inorganic Nanoparticles. In 2010 he was promoted to Full Professor.

In 2022, Burda was a part of a team that received a U.S. Department of Energy $12 million extension grant, following an initial grant of $10.75 million to study "investigating 'breakthrough electrolytes' for large-scale batteries". As a part of his work he has also patented technologies including targeted nanoparticle conjugates. He has also worked on increased the efficiency of converting light into electricity.

Clemens was elected as a fellow of the American Association for the Advancement of Science in 2023 "for distinguished contributions to the field of experimental physical chemistry, particularly for studies of the ultrafast dynamics of semiconductor nanoparticles." That year he published the Springer International book Modern Optical Spectroscopy: From Fundamentals to Applications in Chemistry, Biochemistry and Biophysics with William Parson, which was translated into German in 2025.
