= Barry Richmond =

Barry Marshall Richmond (14 November 1946 – 3 August 2002) was an American systems scientist, and former managing director of High Performance Systems, Inc (HPS), an organization providing software and consulting services to build the capacity of people to understand and improve the workings of dynamic systems. He is known as a leader in the field of systems thinking and system dynamics and for the development of the STELLA/iThink modelling environment for simulation.

== Biography ==
Richmond received a BA in psychology from Syracuse University, an MBA from Columbia University, an MA in operations research from Case Western Reserve University, and a PhD in system dynamics from Massachusetts Institute of Technology, where he was a graduate student of Jay Wright Forrester. Whilst at the MIT Sloan School of Management, Richmond became intrigued with the possibilities of creating a software package to promote modeling and simulation activities using the new Macintosh computer produced by Apple.

Richmond taught courses in systems dynamics in the graduate school of engineering at Northeastern University, before becoming an assistant professor of systems dynamics and an Engineering Professor at Thayer School of Engineering, Dartmouth College. In 1984 he founded High Performance Systems, Inc (HPS), in 2004 renamed to ISEE Systems, and was CEO until his death in 2002. Richmond has also been an associate editor of the journal "Systems dynamics" and "Simulation".

In 2007, ISEE Systems established the "Barry Richmond Scholarship Award" to honor and continue the legacy of its founder. The award is presented annually to a deserving Systems Thinking/System Dynamics practitioner whose work demonstrates a desire to expand the field or to apply it to current social issues.

== See also ==
- Decision support system
- Vensim

== Publications ==
Richmond has published several books, papers and articles. A selection:

- 1987. An Academic User's Guide to Stella Software. With Steve Peterson, Peter Vescuso and Nancy Maville. High Performance Systems.
- 1987. The Simulation of an Arts Organization in STELLA TM. With Michael A Moldaver. Thayer School of Engineering.
- 1987. The Strategic Forum: From Vision to Strategy to Operating Policies and Back Again. High Performance Systems, 1987.
- 1992. An Introduction to Systems Thinking: Ithink Software. With Steve Peterson and Chris Charyk. High Performance Systems.
- 2000. The "thinking" in systems thinking: Seven Essential Skills. Pegasus Communications. ISBN 1-883823-48-X
- 2006. Guns at School: A Systems Thinking Perspective. ISEE Systems, 2006.

Articles, a selection:

- 1993. "Systems thinking: critical thinking skills for the 1990s and beyond" in: System Dynamics Review Volume 9 Number 2 Summer 1993.
- 1994. "System Dynamics/Systems Thinking: Let's Just Get On With It" Delivered at the 1994 International Systems Dynamics Conference, Sterling, Scotland.
