= Thomas J. Carran =

American politician

Thomas Jefferson "Laughing Tom" Carran (1841–1894) was an American attorney and politician. Elected as city attorney of Cleveland in 1867 at the age of just 26, Carran is best remembered for having been elected to the Ohio State Senate.

== Biography ==
=== Early years ===
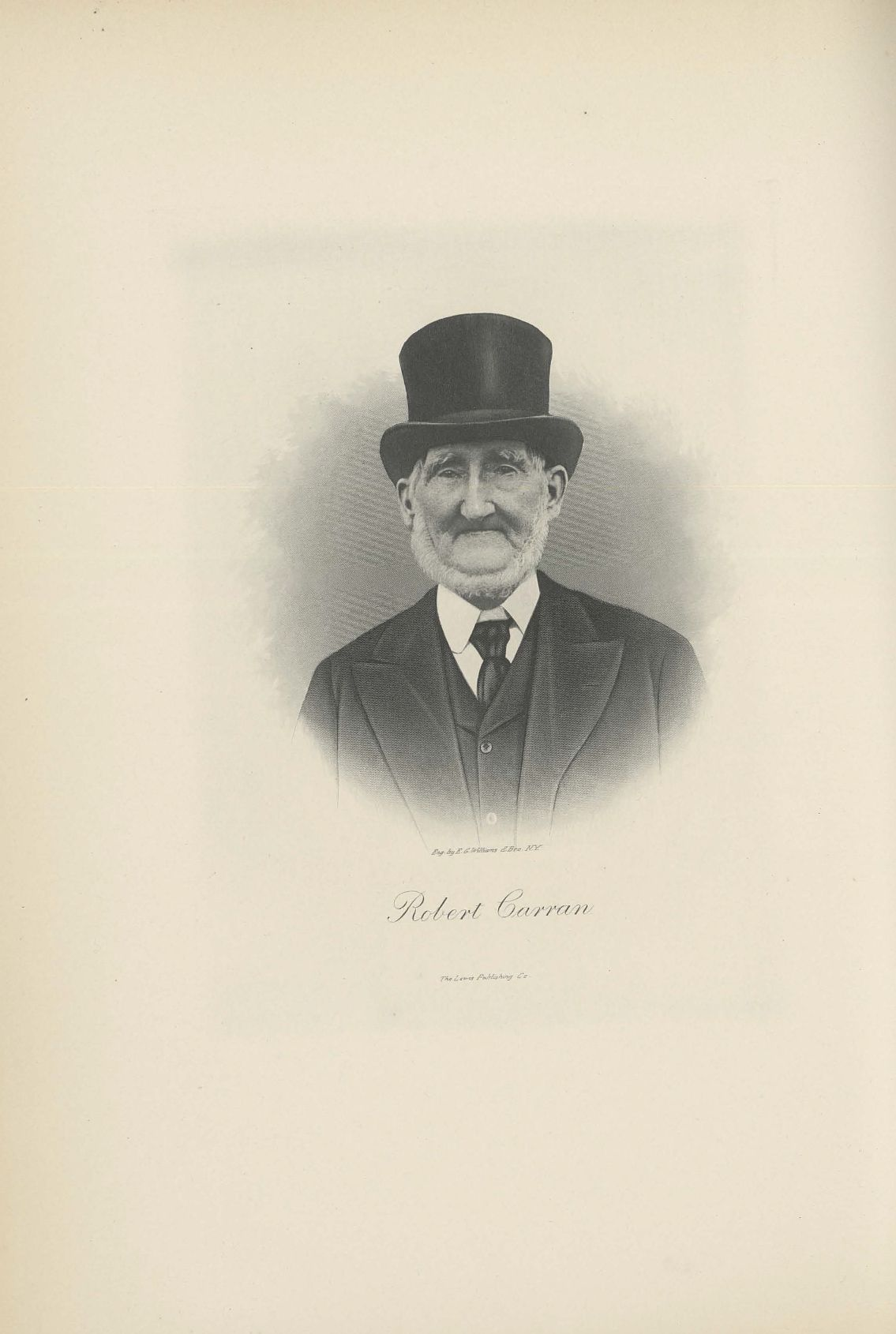
Robert Carran (1812–1914)

Thomas Jefferson Carran was born February 1, 1841, in Warrensville, Ohio, the son of Robert A. Carran, and the former Mary Neal. He attended and graduated from Western Reserve College in Cleveland, Ohio, teaching school for a short time after completion of his university studies.

Following the outbreak of the American Civil War, Carran enlisted in the 134th Ohio Infantry Regiment, fighting on behalf of the Union Army. He received a field promotion for gallantry on the field of battle, gaining commission as a First Lieutenant in October 1862. Carran would later gain a further promotion, completing his military service at the rank of Captain. Carran fought in the Chickamauga Campaign and at the battle of Mission Ridge and did not muster out of the army until the end of the war.

He married C. Louisa Proudfoot (1846–1904) of Cleveland in 1864, with whom he had two children.

After the war Carran moved to Cleveland and began studying law at a prominent firm in the city. Carran was subsequently admitted to the Ohio state bar in 1866 and went into private practice, quickly establishing a successful firm.

=== Political career ===
Carran's first venture into politics came in 1867, when he ran for and was elected as City Attorney of Cleveland — becoming at age 26 the youngest individual ever elected to that position.

Carran won election to the Ohio State Senate in 1878 as a Republican. During his single term of office, Carran helped to elect John Sherman to the United States Senate, in the process becoming a close personal friend of James A. Garfield, who was elected President of the United States in November 1880. He was also a close field of Congressman and Secretary of State James G. Blaine.

As a member of the Ohio Senate, Carran was regarded as of extremely sunny disposition and given the nickname "Laughing Tom," because, as one contemporary put it, "he simply laughs because he can't help it."

In 1887 Carran moved to Los Angeles, California, establishing a new legal practice there. He was a member of the Grand Army of the Republic and an active Freemason.

=== Death ===
In June 1894, Carran was tapped to nominate Spencer G. Millard for Lieutenant Governor of California at the State Republican Convention, held in Sacramento. He retired to his room in the evening of June 20 in good spirits, but did not appear on schedule in the morning of June 21. Around noon his friends sought him out at the hotel in which he was staying, but found him laying on his side, dead for a number of hours. A subsequent autopsy determined that Carran had died of heart disease. Carran was 53 years old at the time of his death.
