= Joseph A. Helpern =

American medical physicist

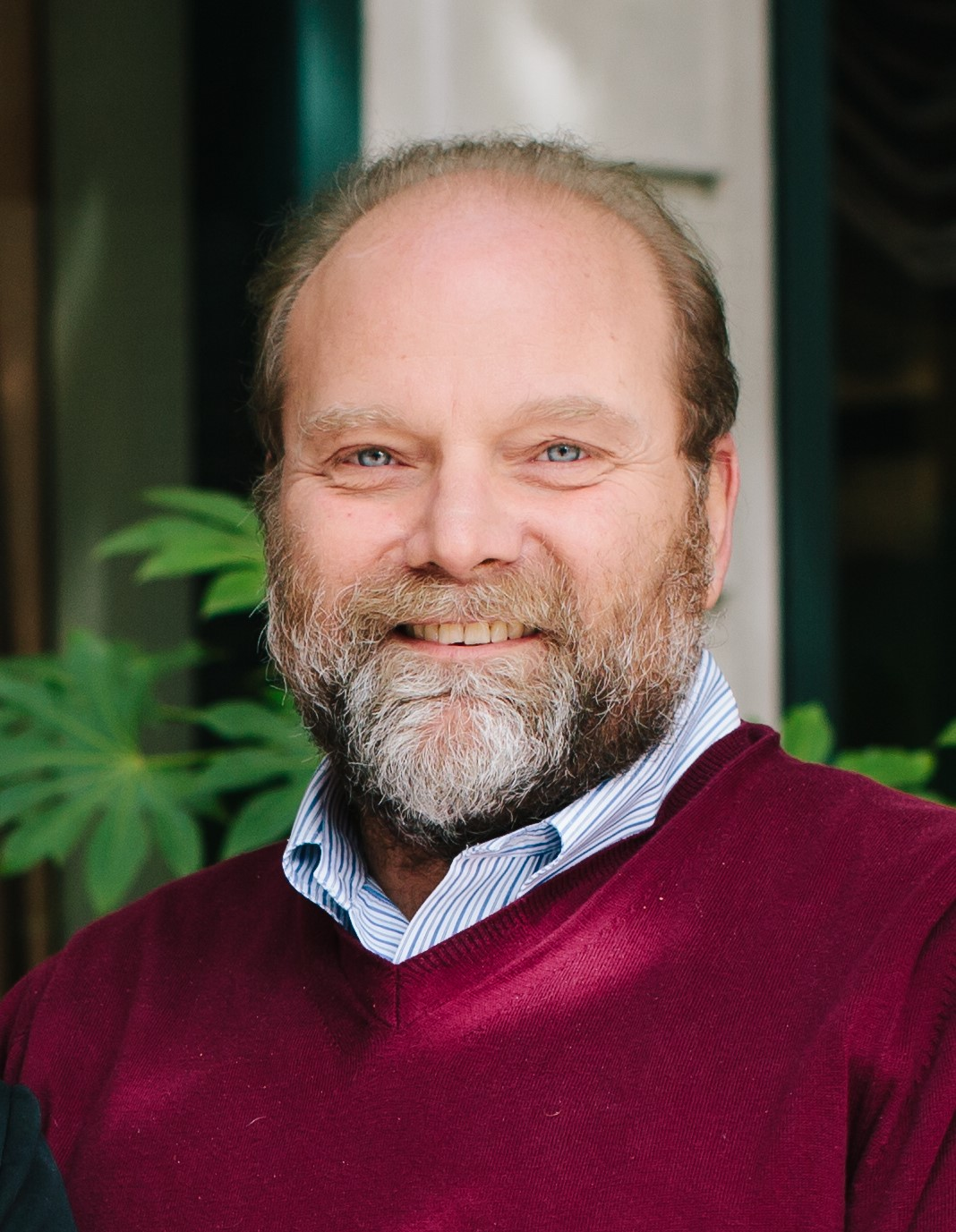
- Born: 1955 (age 70–71)
- Education: PhD
- Alma mater: Case Western Reserve University; University of North Carolina at Chapel Hill; Oakland University
- Occupations: Researcher; Professor
- Known for: MRI research and development
- Title: Professor Emeritus at the Medical University of South Carolina
- Awards: Fellow of the International Society for Magnetic Resonance in Medicine

Joseph A. Helpern is an American medical physicist who is Professor Emeritus at the Medical University of South Carolina and Director of New Vision Research. Helpern is also a Senior Fellow of the International Society for Magnetic Resonance in Medicine. He was previously the South Carolina SmartState Endowed Chair in Brain Imaging and The Lula P. and Asa & David J. Levidow Distinguished Chair in Neurodegenerative Disease Research at the Medical University of South Carolina, and prior to that Vice Chairman for Research of the Department of Radiology at the New York University School of Medicine.

== Education ==
Joseph A. Helpern was born in 1955. He completed a BA at Case Western Reserve University (chemistry), followed by an MA at University of North Carolina at Chapel Hill (chemistry). He completed a PhD at Oakland University (Medical Physics) in 1988.

== Research career ==
In 1979, Helpern was a part of a team at the Baylor College of Medicine that helped design what was then one of the highest resonance MRI systems in the field. Then in 1990, he was the recipient of a grant from the National Institutes of Health to build the first version of the 3-tesla MRI system. Helpern later joined the New York University School of Medicine as Professor in the Departments of Neuroscience and Physiology, Psychiatry, and Radiology and Vice Chairman for Research of the Department of Radiology. At NYU, he developed patents licensed to companies including Siemens.

Helpern was later a Professor in the Departments of Neuroscience and Radiology, Vice Chairman of Department of Radiology, South Carolina SmartState Endowed Chair in Brain Imaging and The Lula P. and Asa & David J. Levidow Distinguished Chair in Neurodegenerative Disease Research at the Medical University of South Carolina. Helpern researches MRI techniques and their application to the study of stroke, Alzheimer's disease and ADHD. Specifically concentrating in the area of water diffusion, he has focused on the imaging of tissue microstructure including white matter fibre bundles. He also co-developed diffusional kurtosis imaging (DKI) as well as magnetic field correlation imaging.

Helpern co-founded the company Advanced Veterinary Technologies, which developed MRI technologies for animals. He is also the co-founder and Director of the non-profit organization New Vision Research, as well as the co-founder of the non-profit Donor's Cure, which helped crowdsource funding for medical research in universities. Helpern became a Fellow of the International Society for Magnetic Resonance in Medicine in 2005 and is a member of the National Academy of Inventors. He received the 2012 Distinguished Investigator Award from the Academy for Radiology & Biomedical Imaging Research.
