= Unisanté =

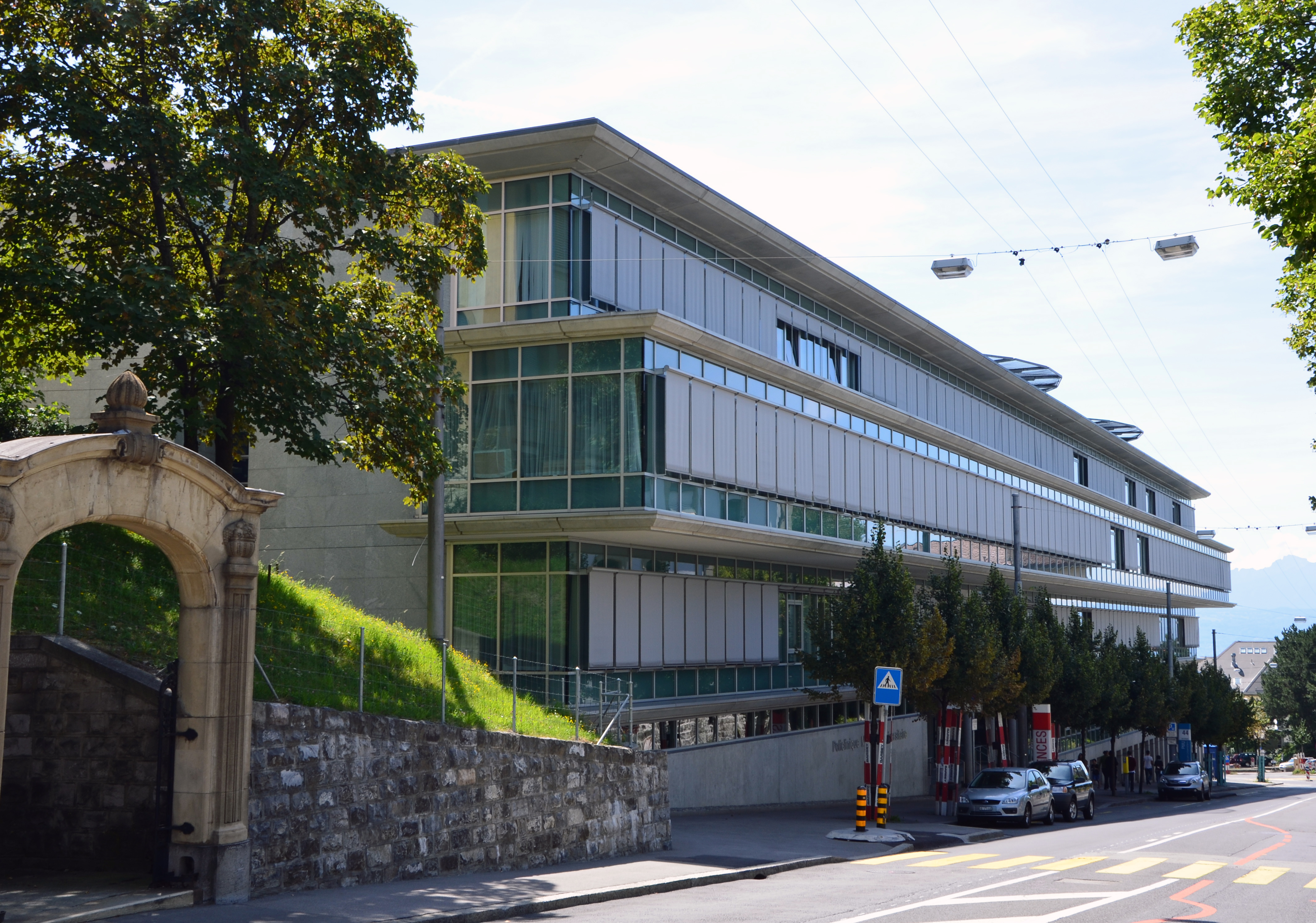
- Established: 1 January 2019 (6 years ago)
- Types: medical organization
- Country: Switzerland
- Coordinates: 46°31′30″N 6°38′20″E
- Employees: 974 (2024)
- Website: www.unisante.ch

The University Centre for Primary Care and Public Health (Unisanté) is a public institution of the Canton of Vaud, in Switzerland.

Unisanté is affiliated to the Directorate-General for Health of the Canton of Vaud and to the University of Lausanne.

Unisanté's vision is to:

Promote and improve the health of individuals and populations in their environment, regardless of their socio-economic status, through prevention, outpatient care and public health measures, within an academic framework.

== History ==
Unisanté was founded on 1 January 2019, through the merger of the following institutions:

- Policlinique médicale universitaire (PMU);
- Institut universitaire de médecine sociale et préventive (IUMSP);
- Institut universitaire romand de santé au travail (IRST);
- Association Promotion santé Vaud (ProSV);
- Fondation vaudoise pour le dépistage du cancer (FVDC, since 2020);
- Équipe mobile d’urgences sociales (EMUS, since 2021);
- Centrale téléphonique des médecins de garde (CTMG, since 2024).

== See also ==
- Healthcare in Switzerland
- Health policy
- Health promotion
