= Pharmaceutical care =

Provision of medication-related care

Pharmaceutical care is a pharmacy practice model developed in the 1990s that describes patient-centered medication management services performed by pharmacists.

== Medication Management Service ==
There are many definitions for "medication management service." The following definition was proposed in the 2012 textbook Pharmaceutical Care Practice: The Patient-Centered Approach to Medication Management:

"Medication management services are the professional activities needed to meet the standard of care which ensures each patient's medications (whether they are prescription, nonprescription, alternative, traditional, vitamins, or nutritional supplements) are individually assessed to determine that each medication is appropriate for the medical condition being treated, that the medication is being effective and achieving the goals established, that the medication is safe for the patient in the presence of the co-morbidities and other medications the patient may be taking, and the patient is able and willing to take the medications as intended."

== History ==
Pharmaceutical care as a pharmacy practice model developed out of the need to re-professionalize pharmacy.

It is thought the first mention of pharmaceutical care came from Dr. Donald Brodie's 1973 lecture shared at The Ninth Annual Rho Chi Lecture in Boston, MA, USA. Dr. Brodie defined pharmaceutical care as "the care a given patient requires and receives which assures safe and rational drug usage." It was then popularized in 1990 after the American Journal of Health-System Pharmacy (AJHP) published an article by Drs. Charles Hepler and Linda Strand entitled ‘Opportunities and responsibilities in pharmaceutical care'.

The concept was endorsed by American Society of Health-System Pharmacists (ASHP) and the American Association of College of Pharmacy (AACP) in 1991. In 1992, the American Pharmacists Association (APhA) followed suit.

In 1993, ASHP issued a statement in response to members seeking a standardized definition of pharmaceutical care. In this statement they defined pharmaceutical care as "the direct, responsible provision of medication-related care for the purpose of achieving definite outcomes that improve a patient’s quality of life."

In 1998, the textbook Pharmaceutical Care Practice: The Patient-Centered Approach to Medication Management was first published. This included a definition of pharmaceutical care informed by the research of Drs. Robert Cipolle, Linda Strand, and Peter Morley that spanned 5 years and involved 20 different community pharmacy practice sites and 54 practicing pharmacists.

The American Medical Association (AMA) approved relevant reimbursement codes in 2004.

In 2013, a European organization, the Pharmaceutical Care Network Europe (PCNE), created a new definition that could satisfy experts from a multitude of countries. After a review of existing definitions, a number of options were presented to the participants and in a one-day meeting consensus on a definition was reached: Pharmaceutical Care is the pharmacologist/pharmacist's contribution to the care of individuals in order to optimize medicines use and improve health outcomes.

== Components ==
=== Philosophy of Practice ===
"The philosophy of pharmaceutical care practice consists of:

- a description of the social need for the practice,
- a clear statement of individual practitioner responsibilities to meet this social need,
- the expectation to be patient-centered, and
- the requirement to function within the caring paradigm.

A philosophy of practice is expected when working with medicine and nursing and is practiced by all health care professionals."

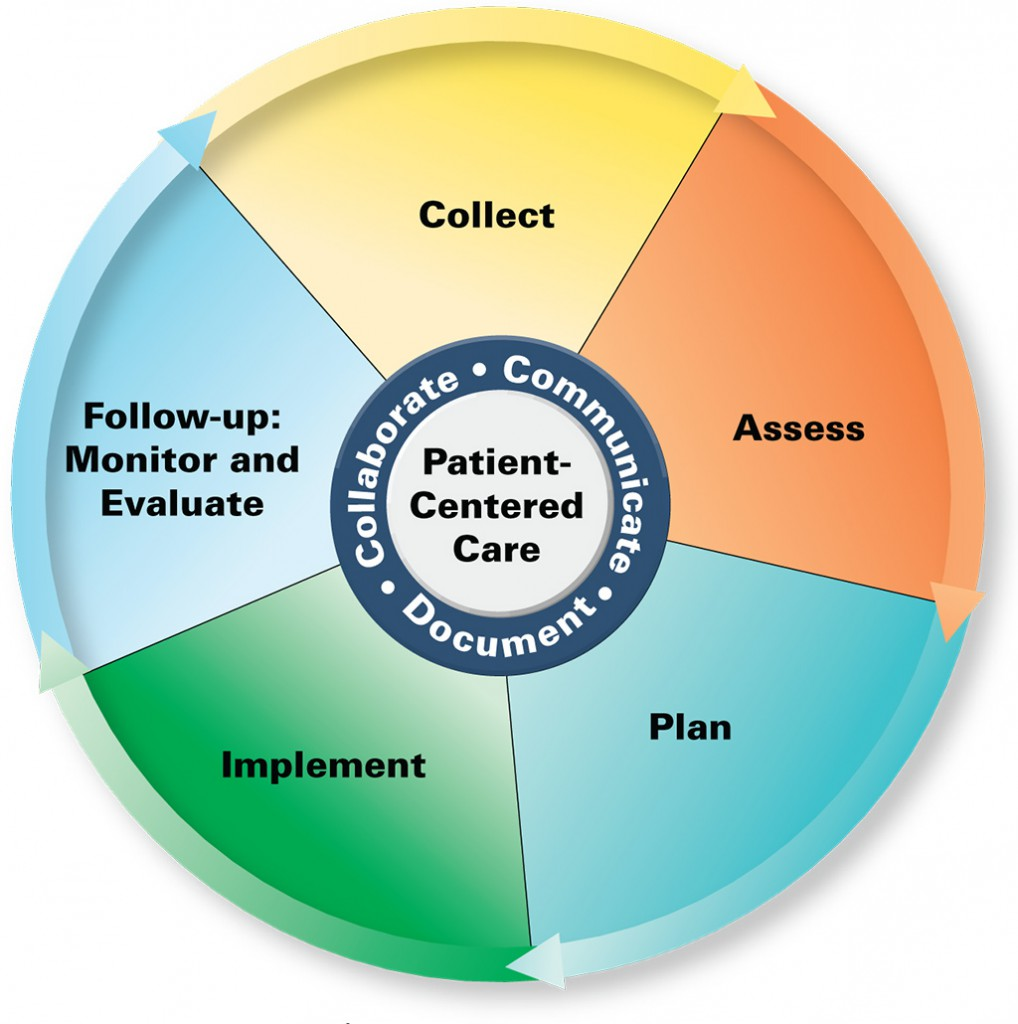
Patient Care Process

=== Patient Care Process ===
The patient care process is a cognitive process in which the drug-related needs of patients are approached systematically and comprehensively.

"The patient care process, which must be consistent with the patient care processes of the other health care providers, consists of:

- an assessment of the patient's drug-related needs,
- a care plan to meet the specific needs of the patient, and
- a follow-up evaluation to determine the impact of the decisions made and actions taken."

A principle of the patient care process is patient-centeredness.

The patient care process was initially called the "Pharmacists Workup of Drug Therapy" and served as a means to document drug therapy decisions.

=== Practice Management System ===
"The practice management system includes all of the resources required to bring the service to the patient. Physical space, the appointment system, documentation, reporting, evaluation, payment for the service, and much more are included in the management of a service."

== Goal ==
The ultimate goal of pharmaceutical care (optimize medicines use and improving health outcomes) exists in all practice settings and in all cultures where medicines are used. It involves two major functions: identifying potential and manifest problems in the pharmacotherapy (drug therapy problems, or DTPs), and then resolving the problems and preventing the potential problems from becoming real for the patient and his therapy outcomes. This should preferably be done together with other health care professionals and the patient through a review of the medication (and diseases) and subsequent counselling and discussions.

== See also ==
- ATC codes Anatomical Therapeutic Chemical Classification System
- Classification of Pharmaco-Therapeutic Referrals
- History of pharmacy
- ICD-10 International Classification of Diseases
- ICPC-2 PLUS
- International Classification of Primary Care ICPC-2
- Pharmacists
- Pharmacotherapy
- Referral (medicine)
- Drug Therapy Problems

== Bibliography ==
- Robert J. Cipolle, Linda M. Strand, Peter C. Morley. Pharmaceutical Care Practice: The Patient-Centered Approach to Medication Management Services. McGraw-Hill 2012.
- Álvarez de Toledo F, et al. Atención farmacéutica en personas que han sufrido episodios coronarios agudos (Estudio TOMCOR). Rev Esp Salud Pública. 2001; 75:375-88.
- Pastor Sánchez R, Alberola Gómez-Escolar C, Álvarez de Toledo Saavedra F, Fernández de Cano Martín N, Solá Uthurry N. Classification of Pharmaco-Terapeutic Referrals (CPR). MEDAFAR. Madrid: IMC; 2008.
- Álvarez de Toledo Saavedra F, Fernández de Cano Martín N, coordinadores. MEDAFAR Asma. Madrid: IMC; 2007.
- Álvarez de Toledo Saavedra F, Fernández de Cano Martín N, coordinadores. MEDAFAR Hipertensión. Madrid: IMC; 2007.
