= Pharmacotherapy =

Medical treatment using approved pharmaceutical products

Pharmacotherapy, also known as pharmacological therapy or drug therapy, is defined as medical treatment that utilizes one or more pharmaceutical drugs to improve ongoing symptoms (symptomatic relief), treat the underlying condition, or act as a prevention for other diseases (prophylaxis).

It can be distinguished from therapy using surgery (surgical therapy), radiation (radiation therapy), movement (physical therapy), or other modes. Among physicians, sometimes the term medical therapy refers specifically to pharmacotherapy as opposed to surgical or other therapy; for example, in oncology, medical oncology is thus distinguished from surgical oncology.

Today's pharmacological therapy has evolved from a long history of medication use, and it has changed most rapidly in the last century due to advancements in drug discovery. The therapy is administered and adjusted by healthcare professionals according to the evidence-based guidelines and the patient's health condition. Personalized medicine also plays a crucial role in pharmacological therapy. Personalized medicine, or precision medicine, takes account of the patient's genetic variation, liver function, kidney function, etc, to provide a tailor-made treatment for a patient. In pharmacological therapy, pharmacists will also consider medication compliance. Medication compliance, or medication adherence, is defined as the degree to which the patient follows the therapy that is recommended by the healthcare professionals.

== History ==
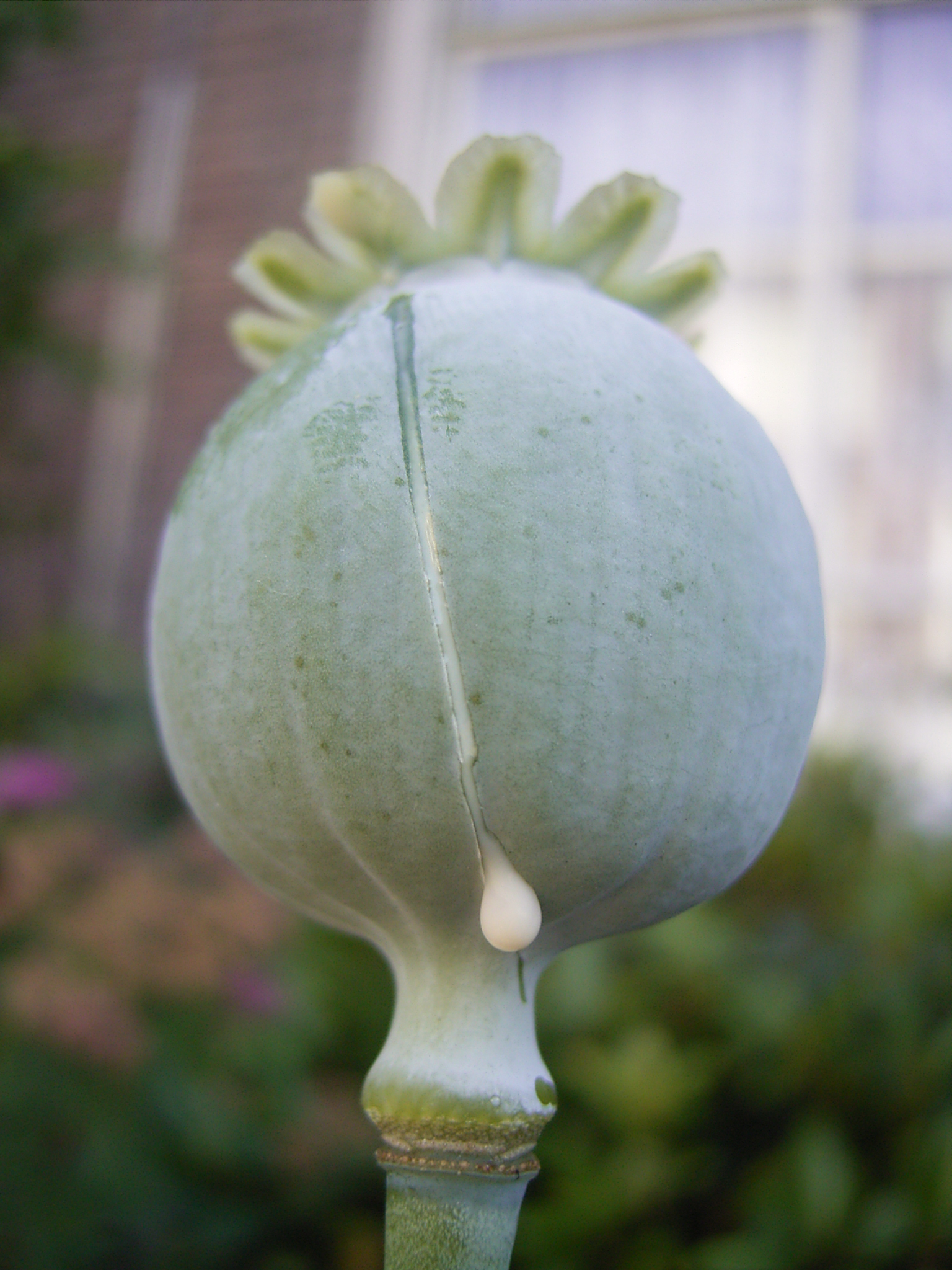
Image of latex sap from a poppy plant. Opium is extracted from latex sap.

=== From natural compounds to pharmaceutical drugs ===
The use of medicinal substances can be traced back to 4000 BC in the Sumer civilization. Healers at the time (called apothecaries), for example, understood the application of opium for pain relief. The history of natural remedies can also be found in other cultures, including traditional Chinese medicine in China and Ayurvedic medicine in India, which are still in use nowadays. Dioscorides, a 1st -century Greek surgeon, described more than six hundred animals, plants, and their derivatives in his medical botany, which remained the most influential pharmacopeia for fourteen hundred years. Besides substances derived from living organisms, metals, including copper, mercury, and antimony, were also used as medical therapies. They were said to cure various diseases during the late Renaissance. In 1657, tartar emetic, which is an antimony compound, was credited with curing Louis XIV of typhoid fever. The drug was also administered intravenously for the treatment of schistosomiasis in the 20th century. However, due to the concern over acute and chronic antimony poisoning, the role of tartar emetic as an antischistosomal agent was gradually replaced after the advent of praziquantel.

Other than using natural products, humans also learned to compound medicine by themselves. The first pharmaceutical text was found on clay tablets from the Mesopotamians, who lived around 2100 BC. Later in the 2nd century AD, compounding was formally introduced by Galen as "a process of mixing two or more medicines to meet the individual needs of a patient". Initially, compounding was only done by individual pharmacists, but in the post-World War II period, pharmaceutical manufacturers surged in number and took over the role of making medicine. Meanwhile, there was a marked increase in pharmaceutical research, which led to a growing number of new drugs. Most drug discovery milestones were made in the last hundred years, from antibiotics to biologics, contributing to the foundation of current pharmacological therapy.

=== Drug discovery ===
Penicillin chemical structure

Most drugs were discovered by empirical means, including observation, accident, and trial and error. One famous example is the discovery of penicillin, the first antibiotic in the world. The substance was discovered by Alexander Fleming in 1928 after a combination of unanticipated events occurred in his laboratory during his summer vacation. The Penicillium mold on the petri dish was believed to secrete a substance (later named "penicillin") that inhibited bacterial growth. Large pharmaceutical companies then started to establish their microbiological departments and search for new antibiotics. The screening program for antimicrobial compounds also led to the discovery of drugs with other pharmacological properties, such as immunosuppressants like Cyclosporin A.

The drug-receptor recognition involves a "key", which is a ligand such as a drug, and a "lock", which is a receptor.

The discovery of penicillin was a serendipitous (i.e. chance) discovery. Another, more advanced approach to drug discovery is rational drug design. The method is underpinned by an understanding of the biological targets of the drugs, including enzymes, receptors, and other proteins. In the late 19th century, Paul Ehrlich observed the selective affinity of dyes for different tissues and proposed the existence of chemoreceptors in our bodies. Receptors were believed to be the specific binding sites for drugs. The drug-receptor recognition was described as a key-and-lock interplay by Emil Fischer in the early 1890s. It was later found that the receptors can either be stimulated or inhibited by chemotherapeutic agents to attain the desired physiological response. Once the ligand interacting with the target macromolecule is identified, drug candidates can be designed and optimized based on the structure-activity relationship. Nowadays, artificial intelligence is employed in drug design to predict drug-protein interactions, drug activity, the 3D configuration of proteins, etc.

== Evidence-based medicine ==
Evidence-based medicine is defined as deploying the best current scientific evidence that is available to give the best treatment and make the best decision effectively and efficiently. Clinical guidelines are developed based on scientific evidence; for example, the ACC/AHA guidelines (for cardiovascular diseases), the GOLD guidelines (for chronic obstructive pulmonary disease), the GINA guidelines (for asthma), etc. They convert and classify the evidence using a systematic method, aiming to provide care with quality. The guidelines cannot substitute clinical judgment, as they cannot meet all the circumstances. Healthcare professionals can use the clinical guidelines as references or evidence to support their clinical judgement when prescribing therapy to patients.

Example: Clinical Guideline for controlling blood pressure (hypertension)

If there is an Asian male patient who is 40 years old and has recently been diagnosed with high blood pressure (with a blood pressure of 140/90) and without any other chronic diseases (comorbidities), such as type-2 diabetes, gout, benign prostatic hyperplasia, etc. His estimated 10-year risk of cardiovascular disease is 15%.

According to the NICE 2019 Hypertension guideline, the healthcare professional can consider starting anti-hypertensive therapy after a discussion with the patient. The first-line therapy will be either an Angiotensin Converting Enzyme Inhibitor (ACEi) or an Angiotensin receptor blocker (ARB) (if the patient cannot tolerate ACEi). If the blood pressure of the patient is not well controlled, the healthcare professionals can consider adding a calcium channel blocker (CCB) or a Thiazide-like diuretic to the previous therapy, i.e., ACEi or ARBs with a CCB or a thiazide-like diuretic.

== Personalized medicine ==
Summary of pharmacokinetics and pharmacodynamics

Every patient has their own body condition, for example, kidney function, liver function, genetic variations, medical history, etc. These are all the factors that should be considered by healthcare professionals before giving any pharmacological therapy. Most importantly, the advancing technology in genetics guides us to have more insight into the linkage between health and genes. In pharmacological therapy, two areas of study are evolving: pharmacogenetics and pharmacogenomics. Age will affect the pharmacokinetics and pharmacodynamics of drugs, and hence the efficacy of the therapy. The effect of age causes deterioration of organ function, like liver function and kidney function. Pharmacokinetics is the study of drugs' effects on absorption, distribution, metabolism, and elimination. Pharmacodynamics is the study of drugs' effects on our body and their mechanisms.

=== Pharmacogenetics and pharmacogenomics ===
Pharmacogenetics is defined as the study of inherited genes causing different drug metabolisms that vary from each other, such as the rate of metabolism and metabolites. Pharmacogenomics is defined as the study of associating the drug response with one's gene. Both terms are similar in nature, so they are used interchangeably.

Multiple alleles can contribute together to a change in response to a drug by expressing a different form of an enzyme that responds differently than the normal ones. The different forms of enzymes (phenotypes) include ultra-rapid metabolizers, moderate metabolizers, no-enzyme activity, etc. The genetic variations can also be used to match the particular adverse drug reaction in order to prevent the patient from suffering the unfavorable outcomes. The genetic make-up can affect the pharmacokinetics.

=== Example: Azathioprine Therapy ===
Azathioprine is an immunomodulator for inflammatory bowel disease, for instance. Its metabolite relies on two different enzymes (TPMT and NUDT15) to eliminate its effect on our body during its metabolism. If the patient has the phenotype of the enzymes that metabolize it poorly, i.e., the poor metabolizer, more toxic metabolites are accumulated in the body. Thus, the patient has a greater risk of the related side-effect. The side effect causes the adjustment of dosage or switching to another drug.

=== Example: Omalizumab Therapy ===
Omalizumab is a humanized monoclonal antibody for the treatment of various allergic diseases, including asthma, urticaria, and allergic rhinitis. It targets the immunoglobulin E (IgE) in human body, which plays an important role in allergic reactions. The efficacy of omalizumab may vary among patients. To identify responders to omalizumab, the level of several biomarkers can be measured, including serum eosinophils, fractional exhaled nitric oxide, and serum IgE. For instance, patients with higher baseline eosinophil counts are likely to respond better to omalizumab therapy.

== Medication compliance ==
Medication compliance is defined as the degree to which the patient follows the therapy that is recommended by healthcare professionals. There are direct and indirect methods to evaluate compliance. Direct method refers to the measurement that the healthcare professionals observed or measure the patient's drug-taking behavior. Indirect method refers to the healthcare professionals do not observe or measure the drug-taking behavior of the patient but use the other source of information to evaluate the compliance.

The direct method includes measurement of drug (or the corresponding metabolite) concentration, while the indirect method includes pill counting and the self-report from the patient. The direct method is more time-consuming, more expensive, more invasive, but it is more accurate. The indirect method has a lower accuracy but is easier to administer to the patient. If the patient fails to comply with treatment, for example, by not taking the medication according to the instructions, it leads to risk and a poor treatment outcome.

=== Example: Tuberculosis treatment ===
For tuberculosis patients, directly observed therapy is still part of the treatment. This is to increase medication compliance. This is to prevent treatment failure, relapse, and transmission in the community. Apart from the traditional direct observed therapy (DOT), there is another method proposed to try increasing medication compliance. Video-observed therapy (VOT) is one of the methods. It has some advantages and disadvantages. It reduces the cost of healthcare and the travel costs for the patient. The downside of the intervention is the need for quality control training as it would be hard to confirm the patient's adherence.

== Role of Pharmacists ==
Pharmacists are experts in pharmacotherapy and are responsible for ensuring the safe, appropriate, and economical use of pharmaceutical drugs. The skills required to function as a pharmacist require knowledge, training and experience in biomedical, pharmaceutical and clinical sciences. Pharmacology is the science that aims to continually improve pharmacotherapy. The pharmaceutical industry and academia use basic science, applied science, and translational science to create new pharmaceutical drugs.

As pharmacotherapy specialists and pharmacists have responsibility for direct patient care, often functioning as a member of a multidisciplinary team, and acting as the primary source of drug-related information for other healthcare professionals. A pharmacotherapy specialist is an individual who is specialized in administering and prescribing medication, and requires extensive academic knowledge in pharmacotherapy.

In the US, a pharmacist can gain Board Certification in the area of pharmacotherapy upon fulfilling eligibility requirements and passing a certification examination. While pharmacists provide valuable information about medications for patients and healthcare professionals, they are not typically considered covered pharmacotherapy providers by insurance companies.

== See also ==
- ATC codes – Anatomical Therapeutic Chemical Classification System
- Chemotherapy
- Classification of Pharmaco-Therapeutic Referrals (CPR)
- Family medicine
- General practice
- Health care
- History of pharmacy
- ICD-10 – International Classification of Diseases
- ICPC-2 PLUS
- International Classification of Primary Care (ICPC-2)
- List of pharmaceutical companies
- Neuromodulation
- Pharmaceutical care
- Pharmaceutical drug
- Pharmacist
- Primary care
- Referral (medicine)
- Therapy
