= General practitioner =

Generalist medical doctor working in primary care

A general practitioner (GP) is a doctor who practices general medicine. GPs have distinct expertise and experience in providing whole person medical care, whilst managing the complexity, uncertainty and risk associated with the continuous care they provide. By contrast with specialist physicians, GPs do not have a specific specialist area; they can diagnose and treat many different conditions, while also determining when a patient needs to see a doctor with more specialised training in a particular area. Generally, they participate more in outpatient care as opposed to inpatient care. The term primary care physician is used in the United States.

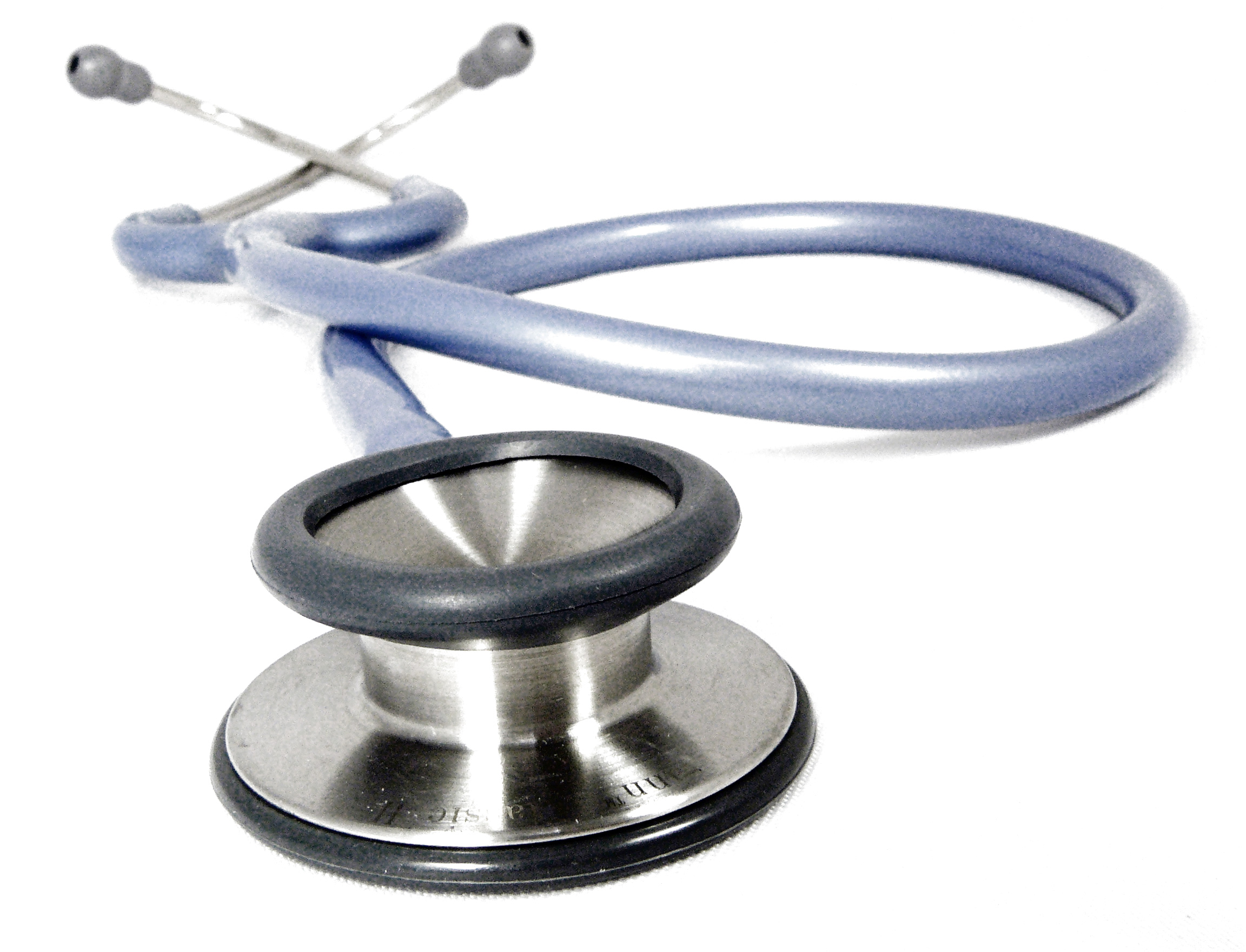
GPs provide personal, family, and community-orientated comprehensive primary care that includes diagnosis, continues over time and is anticipatory as well as responsive

GPs work at the heart of their communities, striving to provide comprehensive and equitable care for everyone, taking into account their health care needs, stage of life and background. GPs work in, connect with and lead multidisciplinary teams that care for people and their families, respecting the context in which they live, aiming to ensure all of their physical health and mental health needs are met. They are trained to treat patients to levels of complexity that vary between countries.

A core element in general practice is continuity of care, that bridges episodes of various illnesses over time. Greater continuity with a general practitioner has been shown to reduce the need for out-of-hours services and acute hospital admittance. Continuous care by the same general practitioner has been found to reduce mortality.

The role of a GP varies between and within countries, and is often dependent on local needs and circumstances. In urban areas their roles may focus on:

- care of chronic/complex health conditions
- treatment of urgent/acute non-life-threatening diseases
- mental health care
- preventive care, including health education and immunisation.
- screening/early detection of disease
- palliative care
- care coordination/referral to allied health professions or specialised medical care

In rural areas, a GP may additionally be routinely involved in pre-hospital emergency care, the delivery of babies, community hospital care and performing low-complexity surgical procedures. GPs may work in larger primary care centers where they provide care within a multidisciplinary healthcare team, while in other cases GPs may work as sole practitioners or in smaller practices.

The term general practitioner or GP is common in the United Kingdom, Republic of Ireland, Australia, Canada, Singapore, South Africa, New Zealand and other Commonwealth countries. In these countries, the word "physician" is largely reserved for medical specialists often working in hospitals, notably in internal medicine. In North America, general practitioners are primary care physicians, a role that family doctors and internists occupy as well, though the American Academy of Family Physicians (AAFP), and the American College of Physicians (ACP) are distinct entities representing these three respective fields.

General practice is an academic and scientific discipline with its own educational content, research, evidence base and clinical activity. Historically, the role of a GP was performed by any doctor with qualifications from a medical school working in the community. However, since the 1950s, general practice has become a medical specialty with additional training requirements. The 1978 Alma Ata Declaration set the intellectual foundation of primary care and general practice.

== Indian subcontinent ==
=== India ===
The basic medical degree in India is MBBS (Bachelor of Medicine, Bachelor of Surgery). These generally consist of a four-and-a-half-year course followed by a year of compulsory rotatory internship in India. The internship requires the candidate to work in all departments for a stipulated period of time, to undergo hands-on training in treating patients.

The registration of doctors is usually managed by state medical councils. A permanent registration as a Registered Medical Practitioner is granted only after satisfactory completion of the compulsory internship.

The Federation of Family Physicians' Associations of India (FFPAI) is an organization which has a connection with more than 8000 general practitioners through having affiliated membership.

=== Bangladesh ===
In Bangladesh, the completion of a 5-year MBBS program is succeeded by a one-year rotational internship encompassing various specialties. Bangladesh Medical & Dental Council (BM&DC) then provides permanent registration to the doctors, after which the candidate may choose to practice as a GP or opt for specialty training.. As of 2019, there are some 86,800 doctors, and dentists registered with the BM&DC.

Bangladesh College of Physicians and Surgeons (BCPS) has a one-year membership and four-year fellowship program in Family Medicine.

=== Pakistan ===
In Pakistan, 5 years of MBBS is followed by one year of internship in different specialties. Pakistan Medical and Dental Council (PMDC) then confers permanent registration, after which the candidate may choose to practice as a GP or opt for specialty training.

The first Family Medicine Training programme was approved by the College of Physicians and Surgeons of Pakistan (CPSP) in 1992 and initiated in 1993 by the Family Medicine Division of the Department of Community Health Sciences, Aga Khan University, Pakistan.

Family Medicine residency training programme of Ziauddin University is approved for Fellowship in Family Medicine.

== Europe ==
=== European Union ===
General practitioners are regulated in the EU by Directive 2005/36/EC.

==== France ====
In France the médecin généraliste (commonly called médecin de famille) is responsible for primary care medicine, including non-vital emergencies and patient's follow up. This implies prevention, education, care of the diseases and traumas. The general practitionner orientates the patients to other specialists when necessary.

They have a role in the survey of epidemics, a legal role (constatation of traumas that can bring compensation, certificates for the practice of a sport, death certificate, certificate for hospitalisation without consent in case of mental incapacity), and a role in the emergency care (they can be called by the samu, the French EMS). They often go to a patient's home when the patient cannot come to the consulting room (especially in case of children or old people), and have to contribute to night and week-end duties.

The studies consist of six years at university (common to all medical specialities), and four years as a resident (interne) :

- the first year (PASS, Parcours d'Accès Spécifique Santé, often abbreviated to P1 by students) is common with the dentists, pharmacists and midwives. The rank at the final competitive examination determines in which branch the student can choose to study.
- the following two years, called propédeutique, are dedicated to the fundamental sciences: anatomy, human physiology, biochemistry, bacteriology, statistics...
- the three following years are called externat and are dedicated to the study of clinical medicine; they end with a classifying examination, the rank determines in which specialty (general medicine is one of them) the student can make her or his internat;
- the internat is three years -or more depending on the specialty- of initial professional experience under the responsibility of a senior; the interne can prescribe, s/he can replace physicians, and usually works in a hospital.

This ends with a doctorate, a research work which usually consist of a statistical study of cases to propose a care strategy for a specific condition (in an epidemiological, diagnostic, or therapeutic point of view).

==== Greece ====
General Practice was established as a medical specialty in Greece in 1986. To qualify as a General Practitioner (γενικός ιατρός, genikos iatros) doctors in Greece are required to complete four years of vocational training after medical school, including three years and two months in a hospital setting. General Practitioners in Greece may either work as private specialists or for the National Healthcare Service, ESY (Εθνικό Σύστημα Υγείας, ΕΣΥ).

==== Netherlands and Belgium ====
General practice in the Netherlands and Belgium is considered advanced. The huisarts (literally: "home doctor") administers first line, primary care. In the Netherlands, patients usually cannot consult a hospital specialist without a required referral. Most GPs work in private practice although more medical centers with employed GPs are seen. Many GPs have a specialist interest, e.g. in palliative care.

In Belgium, one year of lectures and two years of residency are required. In the Netherlands, training consists of three years (full-time) of specialization after completion of internships of 3 years. First and third year of training takes place at a GP practice. The second year of training consists of six months training at an emergency room, or internal medicine, paediatrics or gynaecology, or a combination of a general or academic hospital, three months of training at a psychiatric hospital or outpatient clinic and three months at a nursing home (verpleeghuis) or clinical geriatrics ward/policlinic. During all three years, residents get one day of training at university while working in practice the other days. The first year, a lot of emphasis is placed on communications skills with video training. Furthermore, all aspects of working as a GP gets addressed including working with the medical standards from the Dutch GP association NHG (Nederlands Huisartsen Genootschap). All residents must also take the national GP knowledge test (Landelijke Huisartsgeneeskundige Kennistoets (LHK-toets)) twice a year. In this test of 120 multiple choice questions, medical, ethical, scientific and legal matters of GP work are addressed.

==== Spain ====
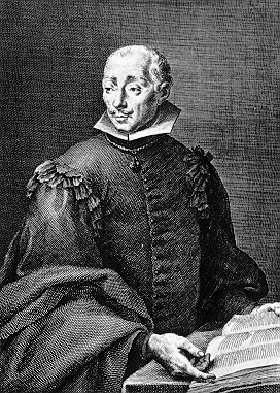
Francisco Vallés (Divino Vallés)

In Spain GPs are officially especialistas en medicina familiar y comunitaria but are commonly called "médico de cabecera" or "médico de familia". It was established as a medical specialty in Spain in 1978.

Most Spanish GPs work for the state-funded health services provided by the county's 17 regional governments (comunidades autónomas). They are in most cases salary-based healthcare workers.

For the provision of primary care, Spain is currently divided geographically in basic health care areas (áreas básicas de salud), each one containing a primary health care team (Equipo de atención primaria). Each team is multidisciplinary and typically includes GPs, community pediatricians, nurses, physiotherapists and social workers, together with ancillary staff. In urban areas all the services are concentrated in a single large building (Centro de salud) while in rural areas the main center is supported by smaller branches (consultorios), typically single-handled.

Becoming a GP in Spain involves studying medicine for 6 years, passing a competitive national exam called MIR (Medico Interno Residente) and undergoing a 4-year training program. The training program includes core specialties as general medicine and general practice (around 12 months each), pediatrics, gynecology, orthopedics and psychiatry. Shorter and optional placements in ENT, ophthalmology, ED, infectious diseases, rheumathology or others add up to the 4 years curriculum. The assessment is work based and involves completing a logbook that ensures all the expected skills, abilities and aptitudes have been acquired by the end of the training period.

=== Russia ===
In the Russian Federation, the General Practitioner's Regulation was put into effect in 1992, after which medical schools started training in the relevant specialty. The right to practice as a general practitioner gives a certificate of appropriate qualifications. General medical practice can be carried out both individually and in a group, including with the participation of narrow specialists. The work of general practitioners is allowed, both in the medical institution and in private. The general practitioner has broad legal rights. He can lead junior medical personnel, provide services under medical insurance contracts, conclude additional contracts to the main contract, and conduct an examination of the quality of medical services. For independent decisions, the general practitioner is responsible in accordance with the law.

The main tasks of a general practitioner are:

- Prevention, diagnosis and treatment of the most common diseases;
- Emergency and emergency medical care;
- Performance of medical manipulations.

=== United Kingdom ===
In the United Kingdom physicians wishing to become GPs take at least five years' training after medical school, which is usually an undergraduate course of five to six years (or a graduate course of four to six years) leading to the degrees of Bachelor of Medicine and Bachelor of Surgery.

Until 2005, those wishing to become a general practitioner of medicine had to do a minimum of the following postgraduate training:

- One year as a pre-registration house officer (PRHO) (formerly called a house officer), in which the trainee would usually spend six months on a general surgical ward and six months on a general medical ward in a hospital;
- Two years as a senior house officer (SHO) – often on a General Practice Vocational Training Scheme (GP-VTS) in which the trainee would normally complete four six-month jobs in hospital specialties such as obstetrics and gynaecology, paediatrics, geriatric medicine, accident and emergency or psychiatry;
- One year as a general practice registrar on a GPST.

This process changed under the programme Modernising Medical Careers. Medical practitioners graduating from 2005 onwards have to do a minimum of five years postgraduate training:

- Two years of Foundation Training, in which the trainee will do a rotation around either six four-month jobs or eight three-month jobs – these include at least three months in general medicine and three months in general surgery, but will also include jobs in other areas;
- A three-year "run-through" GP Speciality Training Programme containing (GPSTP): This comprises a minimum of twelve months as a hospital based Specialty Trainee during which time the trainee completes a mixture of jobs in specialties such as obstetrics and gynaecology, paediatrics, geriatric medicine, accident and emergency or psychiatry; eighteen to twenty-four months as a GP Specialty Trainee working in General Practice. The balance of training time spent in hospital versus in GP is planned to shift in 2022 to be consistently 12 months' hospital training and 24 months' training time in general practice.

Medical career grades of the National Health Service
Year	Current (Modernising Medical Careers)		Previous	
1	Foundation doctor -sometimes called Foundation House Officer, 2 years (FY1 and FY2)		Pre-registration house officer (PRHO), 1 year	
2	Foundation doctor -sometimes called Foundation House Officer, 2 years (FY1 and FY2)		Senior house officer (SHO), minimum 2 years; often more	
3	Core Trainee/Specialist Trainee, often still referred to as Senior house officer, CT/ST 1-2	Specialty registrar, general practice (GPST 1-3)	Senior house officer (SHO), minimum 2 years; often more	
4	Core Trainee/Specialist Trainee, often still referred to as Senior house officer, CT/ST 1-2	Specialty registrar, general practice (GPST 1-3)	Specialist registrar, 4–6 years	GP registrar, 1 year
5	Specialty registrar, hospital speciality (SpR, CT 3/ ST 3-6+)	Specialty registrar, general practice (GPST 1-3)	Specialist registrar, 4–6 years	General practitioner, 4 years total time in training
6	Specialty registrar, hospital speciality (SpR, CT 3/ ST 3-6+)	General practitioner, minimum 5 years total time in training	Specialist registrar, 4–6 years	General practitioner, 4 years total time in training
7	Specialty registrar, hospital speciality (SpR, CT 3/ ST 3-6+)	General practitioner, minimum 5 years total time in training	Consultant, minimum 7 years total time in training	General practitioner, 4 years total time in training
8	Consultant, minimum 7–9 years total time in training	General practitioner, minimum 5 years total time in training	Consultant, minimum 7 years total time in training	General practitioner, 4 years total time in training
Optional	Training is competency based, times shown are a minimum. Training may be extended by obtaining an Academic Clinical Fellowship for research or by dual certification in another speciality.		Training may be extended by pursuing medical research (usually 2–3 years), usually with clinical duties as well	

The postgraduate qualification Membership of the Royal College of General Practitioners (MRCGP) was previously optional. In 2008, a requirement was introduced for physicians to succeed in the MRCGP assessments in order to be issued with a certificate of completion of their specialty training (CCT) in general practice. After passing the assessments, they are eligible to use the post-nominal letters MRCGP (so long as the physicians continued to pay membership fees to the RCGP, though many do not). During the GP specialty training programme, the medical practitioner must complete a variety of assessments in order to be allowed to practice independently as a GP. There is a knowledge-based exam with multiple choice questions called the Applied Knowledge Test (AKT). The practical examination takes the form of a "simulated surgery" in which the physicians is presented with thirteen clinical cases and assessment is made of data gathering, interpersonal skills and clinical management. This Clinical Skills Assessment (CSA) is held on three or four occasions throughout the year and takes place at the renovated headquarters of the Royal College of General Practitioners (RCGP), at 30 Euston Square, London. Finally, throughout the year the physician must complete an electronic portfolio which is made up of case-based discussions, critique of videoed consultations and reflective entries into a "learning log".

In addition, many hold qualifications such as the DCH (Diploma in Child Health of the Royal College of Paediatrics and Child Health) or the DRCOG (Diploma of the Royal College of Obstetricians and Gynaecologists), the DPD (Diploma in Practical Dermatology) or the DGH (Diploma in Geriatric Medicine of the Royal College of Physicians). Some General Practitioners also hold the MRCP (Member of the Royal College of Physicians) or other specialist qualifications, but generally only if they had a hospital career, or a career in another speciality, before training in General Practice.

There are many arrangements under which general practitioners can work in the UK. While the main career aim is becoming a principal or partner in a GP surgery, many become salaried or non-principal GPs, work in hospitals in GP-led acute care units or perform locum work. Whichever of these roles they fill, the vast majority of GPs receive most of their income from the National Health Service (NHS). Principals and partners in GP surgeries are self-employed, but they have contractual arrangements with the NHS which give them considerable predictability of income.

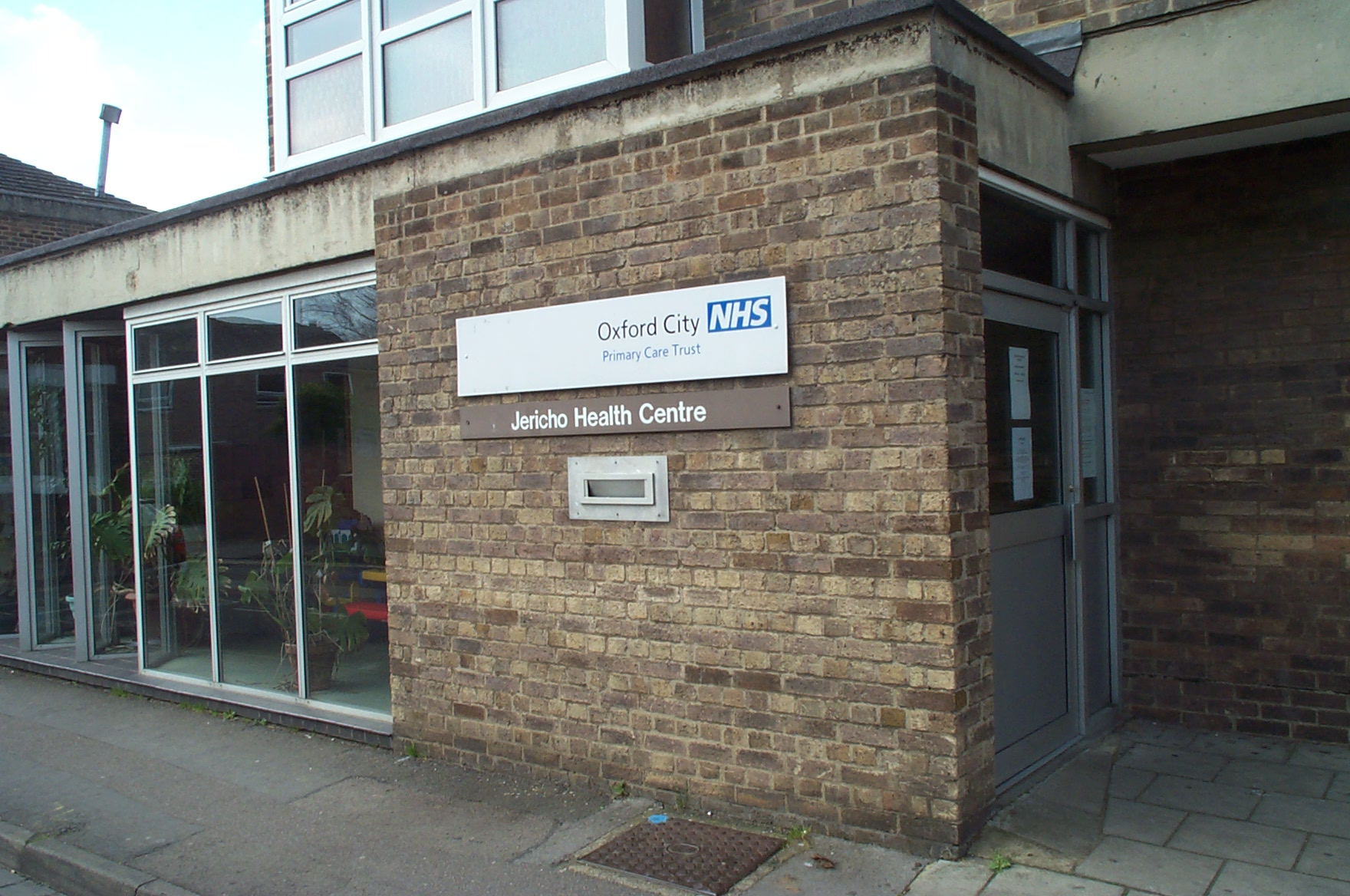
GPs in the United Kingdom may operate in community health centres.

Visits to GP surgeries are free in all countries of the United Kingdom, but charges for prescriptions are applied in England (except for those over 60, under 18, and those on low incomes and welfare). Wales, Scotland and Northern Ireland have abolished all charges.

Recent reforms to the NHS have included changes to the GP contract. General practitioners are no longer required to work unsociable hours and get paid to some extent according to their performance, (e.g. numbers of patients treated, what treatments were administered, and the health of their catchment area, through the Quality and Outcomes Framework). The IT system used for assessing their income based on these criteria is called QMAS. The amount that a GP can expect to earn does vary according to the location of their work and the health needs of the population that they serve. Within a couple of years of the new contract being introduced, it became apparent that there were a few examples where the arrangements were out step with what had been expected. A full-time self-employed GP, such as a GMS or PMS practice partner, might currently expect to earn a profit share of around £95,900 before tax while a GP employed by a CCG could expect to earn a salary in the range of £54,863 to £82,789. This can equate to an hourly rate of around £40 an hour for a GP partner.

A survey by Ipsos MORI released in 2011 reports that 88% of adults in the UK "trust doctors to tell the truth".

In May 2017, there was said to be a crisis in the UK with practices having difficulties recruiting GPs they need. Helen Stokes-Lampard of the Royal College of General Practitioners said, "At present, UK general practice does not have sufficient resources to deliver the care and services necessary to meet our patients' changing needs, meaning that GPs and our teams are working under intense pressures, which are simply unsustainable. Workload in general practice is escalating – it has increased 16% over the last seven years, according to the latest research – yet investment in our service has steadily declined over the last decade and the number of GPs has not risen in step with patient demand ... This must be addressed as a matter of urgency.". Professor Azeem Majeed from Imperial College has also raised concerns about general practice in the UK.

In 2018 the average GP worked less than three and a half days a week because of the "intensity of working day".

There is an NHS England initiative to situate GPs in or near hospital emergency departments to divert minor cases away from A&E and reduce pressure on emergency services. 97 hospital trusts have been allocated money, mostly for premises alterations or development.

== North America ==
=== United States ===
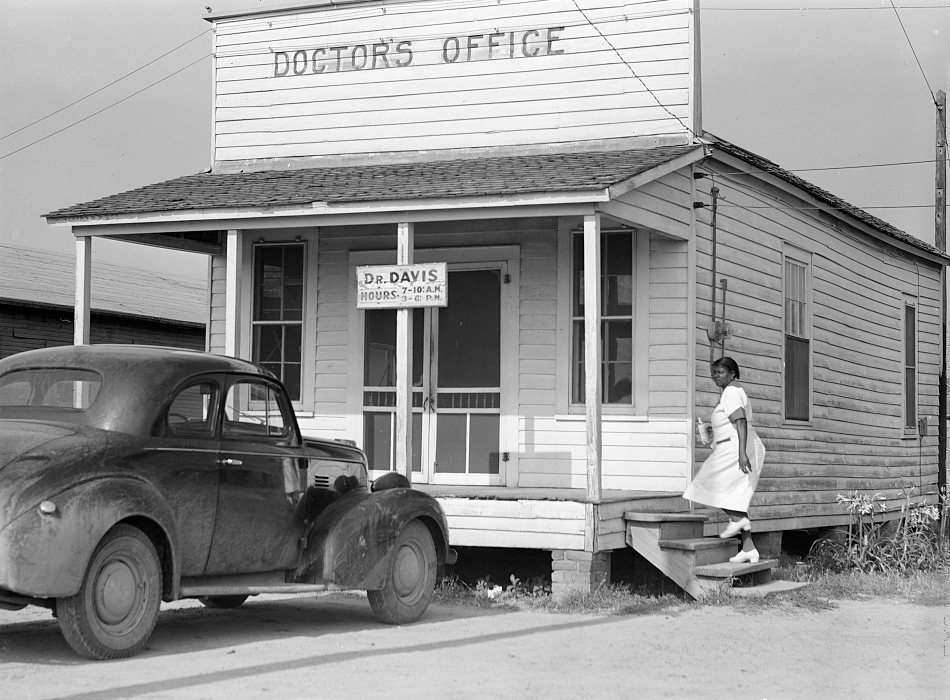
A general practitioner's office in 1940

The population of this type of medical practitioner is declining, however. Currently, the Medical Departments of the US Air Force, Army and Navy have many of these general practitioners, known as General Medical Officers or GMOs, in active practice. The GMO is an inherent concept to all military medical branches. GMOs are the gatekeepers of medicine in that they hold the purse strings and decide upon the merit of specialist consultation. The US now holds a different definition for the term "general practitioner". The two terms "general practitioner" and "family practice" were synonymous prior to 1970. At that time both terms (if used within the US) referred to someone who completed medical school and the one-year required internship, and then worked as a general family doctor. Completion of a post-graduate specialty training program or residency in family medicine was, at that time, not a requirement. A physician who specializes in "family medicine" must now complete a residency in family medicine and must be eligible for board certification, which is required by many hospitals and health plans for hospital privileges and remuneration, respectively. It was not until the 1970s that family medicine was recognized as a specialty in the US.

Many licensed family medical practitioners in the United States after this change began to use the term "general practitioner" to refer to those practitioners who previously did not complete a family medicine residency. Family physicians (after completing medical school) must then complete three to four years of additional residency in family medicine. Three hundred hours of medical education within the prior six years is also required to be eligible to sit for the board certification exam; these hours are largely acquired during residency training.

The existing general practitioners in the 1970s were given the choice to be grandfathered into the newly created specialty of Family Practice. In 1971 the American Academy of General Practice changed its name to the American Academy of Family Physicians. The prior system of graduating from medical school and completing one year of post-graduate training (rotating internship) was not abolished as 47 of the 50 states allow a physician to obtain a medical license without completion of residency. If one wanted to become a "house-call-making" type of physician, one still needs to only complete one or two years of a residency in either pediatrics, family medicine or internal medicine. This would make a physician a non-board eligible general practitioner able to qualify and obtain a license to practice medicine in 47 of the 50 United States of America. Since the establishment of the Board of Family Medicine, a family medicine physician is no longer the same as a general practitioner. What makes a Family Medicine Physician different from a General Practitioner/Physician is two-fold. First off, a Family Medicine Physician has completed the three years of Family Medicine residency and is board eligible or board certified in Family Mediacine, under the auspices of the American Board of Family Medicine or the American Osteopathic Board of Family Physicians. Secondly, a Family Medicine Physician is able to practice obstetrics, the care of the pregnant woman from conception to delivery, while a general practitioner typically are not trained in obstetrics.Prior to recent history most postgraduate education in the United States was accomplished using the mentor system, a form of apprenticeship. A physician would finish a rotating internship and move to some town and be taught by the local physicians the skills needed for that particular town. This allowed each community's needs to be met by the teaching of the new general practitioner the skills needed in that community. This also allowed the new physician to start making a living and raising a family, etc. General practitioners would be the surgeons, the obstetricians, and the internists for their given communities. Changes in demographics and the growing complexities of the developing bodies of knowledge made it necessary to produce more highly trained surgeons and other specialists. For many physicians it was a natural desire to want to be considered "specialists".

=== Canada ===
The College of General Practice of Canada was founded in 1954 but in 1967 changed its name to College of Family Physicians of Canada (CFPC).

== Oceania ==
=== Australia ===
General Practice in Australia and New Zealand has undergone many changes in training requirements over the past decade. The basic medical degree in Australia is the MBBS (Bachelor of Medicine, Bachelor of Surgery), which has traditionally been attained after completion of an undergraduate five or six-year course. Over the last few years, an ever-increasing number of post-graduate four-year medical programs (previous bachelor's degree required) have become more common and now account more than half of all Australian medical graduates. After graduating, a one-year internship is completed in a public and private hospitals prior to obtaining full registration. Many newly registered medical practitioners undergo one year or more of pre-vocational position as Resident Medical Officers (different titles depending on jurisdictions) before specialist training begins. For general practice training, the medical practitioner then applies to enter a three- or four-year program either through the "Australian General Practice Training Program", "Remote Vocational Training Scheme" or "Independent Pathway". The Australian Government has announced an expansion of the number of GP training places through the AGPT program- 1,500 places per year will be available by 2015.

A combination of coursework and apprenticeship type training leading to the awarding of the FRACGP (Fellowship of the Royal Australian College of General Practitioners) or FACRRM (Fellowship of Australian College of Rural and Remote Medicine), if successful. Since 1996 this qualification or its equivalent has been required in order for new GPs to access Medicare rebates as a specialist general practitioner. Doctors who graduated prior to 1992 and who had worked in general practice for a specified period of time were recognized as "Vocationally Registered" or "VR" GPs, and given automatic and continuing eligibility for general practice Medicare rebates. There is a sizable group of doctors who have identical qualifications and experience, but who have been denied access to VR recognition. They are termed "Non-Vocationally Registered" or so-called "non-VR" GPs. The federal government of Australia recognizes the experience and competence of these doctors, by allowing them access to the "specialist" GP Medicare rebates for working in areas of government policy priority, such as areas of workforce shortage, and metropolitan after hours service. Some programs awarded permanent and unrestricted eligibility for VR rebate levels after 5 years of practice under the program. There is a community-based campaign in support of these so-called Non-VR doctors being granted full and permanent recognition of their experience and expertise, as fully identical with the previous generation of pre-1996 "grandfathered" GPs. This campaign is supported by the official policy of the Australian Medical Association (AMA).

Medicare is Australia's universal health insurance system, and without access to it, a practitioner cannot effectively work in private practice in Australia.

Procedural General Practice training in combination with General Practice Fellowship was first established by the "Australian College of Rural and Remote Medicine" in 2004. This new fellowship was developed in aid to recognise the specialised skills required to work within a rural and remote context. In addition it was hoped to recognise the impending urgency of training Rural Procedural Practitioners to sustain Obstetric and Surgical services within rural Australia. Each training registrar select a speciality that can be used in a rural area from the Advanced Skills Training list and spends a minimum of 12 months completing this specialty, the most common of which are Surgery, Obstetrics/Gynaecology and Anaesthetics. Further choices of specialty include Aboriginal and Torres Strait Islander Health, Adult Internal Medicine, Emergency Medicine, Mental Health, Paediatrics, Population health and Remote Medicine. Shortly after the establishment of the FACRRM, the Royal Australian College of General Practitioners introduced an additional training year (from the basic 3 years) to offer the "Fellowship in Advanced Rural General Practice". The additional year, or Advanced Rural Skills Training (ARST) can be conducted in various locations from Tertiary Hospitals to Small General Practice.

The competent authority pathway is a work-based place assessment process to support International Medical Graduates (IMGs) wishing to work in General Practice. Approval for the ACRRM to undertake these assessments was granted by the Australian Medical Council in August 2010 and the process is to be streamlined in July 2014.

=== New Zealand ===
In New Zealand, most GPs work in clinics and health centres usually as part of a Primary Health Organisation (PHO). These are funded at a population level, based on the characteristics of a practice's enrolled population (referred to as capitation-based funding). Fee-for-service arrangements still exist with other funders such as Accident Compensation Corporation (ACC) and Ministry of Social Development (MSD), as well as receiving co-payments from patients to top-up the capitation-based funding.

The basic medical degree in New Zealand is the MBChB degree (Bachelor of Medicine, Bachelor of Surgery), which has traditionally been attained after completion of an undergraduate five or six-year course. In NZ new graduates must complete the GPEP (General Practice Education Program) Stages I and II in order to be granted the title Fellowship of the Royal New Zealand College of General Practitioners (FRNZCGP), which includes the PRIMEX assessment and further CME and Peer group learning sessions as directed by the RNZCGP. Holders of the award of FRNZCGP may apply for specialist recognition with the New Zealand Medical Council (MCNZ), after which they are considered specialists in General Practice by the council and the community. In 2009 the NZ Government increased the number of places available on the state-funded programme for GP training.

There is a shortage of GPs in rural areas and increasingly outer metropolitan areas of large cities, which has led to the use of overseas trained doctors (international medical graduates (IMGs)).

== See also ==
- American Board of Family Medicine
- ATC codes Anatomical Therapeutic Chemical Classification System
- Classification of Pharmaco-Therapeutic Referrals—CPR
- Dental General Practitioner (GDP)
- Family medicine
- General practice
- GP Liaison
- ICD-10—International Classification of Diseases
- ICPC-2 PLUS
- International Classification of Primary Care (ICPC-2)
- National Integrated Medical Association
- Primary care
- Quaternary prevention
- Referral (medicine)
- Sessional GP

== Bibliography ==
- Francis, Gavin (7 February 2015). "John Berger's A Fortunate Man: A Masterpiece of Witness". The Guardian. London.
