= BioDrugs =

- Discipline: Drug therapy, pharmacology
- Language: English
- Edited by: Mike Herbert

Publication details
- History: 1994-present
- Publisher: Adis International (Springer Nature) (New Zealand)
- Frequency: Bimonthly
- Open access: Hybrid
- Impact factor: 8.8 (2024)

Standard abbreviations
- ISO 4: BioDrugs

Indexing
- CODEN: BIDRF4
- ISSN: 1173-8804 (print); 1179-190X (web)

Links
- Journal homepage; Online archive

BioDrugs is a peer-reviewed pharmacology journal. BioDrugs covers the development and therapeutic application of biotechnology-based pharmaceuticals and diagnostic products for the treatment of human disease. It has a 2024 impact factor of 6.9. It is published by Adis International (SpringerNature).
