= International Psychopharmacology Algorithm Project =

Non-profit corporation

The International Psychopharmacology Algorithm Project (IPAP) is a non-profit corporation whose purpose is to "enable, enhance, and propagate" use of algorithms for the treatment of some Axis I psychiatric disorders.

Kenneth O Jobson founded the Project. The Dean Foundation provides funding.

IPAP has organized and supported several international conferences on psychopharmacology algorithms. It has also supported the creation of several algorithms based on expert opinion. It is now in the process of creating "evidence-based algorithms," that is algorithms created by experts and annotated with the evidence that leads to these algorithms. A schizophrenia algorithm has been created and one on Post Traumatic Stress Disorder (PTSD) was released in July 2005. A general anxiety disorder (GAD) algorithm was released in 2006. Periodic updates of the algorithms are released as the basis of evidence changes. In addition, the algorithms are being translated into various non-English languages (Chinese, Japanese, Spanish, and Thai) as the availability of translators permits.
