= Primary health organisation =

Primary health organisations (PHOs) in New Zealand are health care providers that are funded on a capitation basis by the New Zealand Government via district health boards. They are usually set up as not-for-profit trusts, and have as their goal the improvement of their population's health.

== History ==
In the early 1990s, general practitioners (GPs) were joining together to form independent practitioner associations. They did this to better negotiate with the purchasers of healthcare at that time.

Prior to the introduction of PHOs, general practitioners were paid using a fee-for-service model. For every person that went through their door, the GP received a set amount of money from the New Zealand Government. For some time, the Government had been trying to introduce a capitation model, that is, give practices a set amount of money depending on the population they served. The formation of the voluntary IPAs gave the Government an important stepping stone to introduce capitation-based funding.

The Ministry of Health introduced PHOs under the Primary Health Care Strategy to replace the independent practitioner association system in 2001, and the first PHOs formed in July 2002. By May 2008, 82 PHOs had been established and authorised. More than half have since merged with other PHOs or otherwise ceased operation, and 30 PHOs operated as of July 2021, some of which are divided regionally for funding purposes.

== Structure and goals ==
A primary health organisation is structured as a not-for-profit organisation with both community and provider representation. They maintain a list of their enrolled populations for which they receive funding. PHOs include general practitioners, nurses, and other health providers such as pharmacists and physical therapists.

== Funding ==
Primary health organisations are allocated funds depending on the characteristics of their enrolled population (a form of capitation).

The PHO receives a set amount of money from the district health board for every member, depending on their age, sex, ethnicity and socioeconomic status. They are also allocated funds for health promotion, individuals with special care requirements, as well as for rural practice.

Health care providers that are part of PHOs also have the right to charge fees to their patients for each visit. PHOs may also receive funding through contracting with the Ministry of Health, district health boards or other organisations such as Accident Compensation Corporation (ACC). Usually these contracts are to provide specific services or to pass on additional subsidies to target patient groups (over and above ordinary capitation subsidies).

This policy costs the Government more money to implement, and the expected proportion of each GP visit paid by the Government is higher than it has been previously. This means that generally New Zealanders can expect to pay less for a visit to the doctor.

== Perceived advantages ==
Benefits for individual patients

- Overall lower fees
- Wider range of services

Benefits for the population as a whole

- Encouragement of rural practice
- Increased emphasis on preventative measures
- Services tailored to the needs of the communities PHOs serve

Benefits for general practices

- Steady and predictable stream of income
- Better use of nurses (previously, a doctor had to see a patient for a practice to get paid by the Government)

== See also ==
- Primary care
