= Drug therapy problems =

Categorization related to the use of drugs in the field of pharmaceutical care

Drug therapy problems (DTPs) (or drug related problems, DRPs) represent the categorization and definition of clinical problems related to the use of medications or "drugs" in the field of pharmaceutical care. In the course of clinical practice, DTPs are often identified, prevented, and/or resolved by pharmacists in the course of medication therapy management, as experts on the safety and efficacy of medications, but other healthcare professionals may also manage DTPs.

A drug-therapy (related) problem can be defined as an event or circumstance involving drug treatment (pharmacotherapy) that interferes with the optimal provision of medical care. In 1990, L.M. Strand and her colleagues (based on the previous work of R.L Mikeal and D.C Brodie, published respectively in 1975 and 1980) classified the DTPs into eight different categories. According to these categories, pharmacists generated a list of the DTPs for each patient. As a result, pharmacists had a cleaner picture of the patient's drug therapy and medical conditions. A second publication of R.J Cipolle with L.M Strand in 1998, change the eight categories into seven, grouped in four Pharmacotherapy needs: indication, effectiveness, safety and adherence.

== Examples ==
- Patients who have chronic pain that are prescribed opioid painkillers (such as morphine) may build up a tolerance to the effect of the painkillers, requiring higher doses to achieve the same pain reducing effect. This risky practice of dose escalation can lead to drug overdoses.
- Some drugs reduce the body's absorption of essential nutrients from food, which could lead to nutritional deficiencies.

== The original eight problems ==
According to page 73 in Introduction to Health Care Delivery: A Primer for Pharmacists, drug therapy problems (DTP) originated from Strand et al. (1990) who defined eight problems that could result in poorer health outcomes in an attempt to categorize DTP. Helper and Strand later in 1990 stated the mission statement or raison d'etre of pharmacists should be to correct these drug therapy problems.

The original eight problems have now been condensed into seven categories of problems. As given by Shargel, they are:

1. Unnecessary drug therapy. This could occur when the patient has been placed on too many medications for their condition and the drug is simply not needed.
2. Wrong drug. This could occur when a patient is given medication that does not treat the patient's condition. Ex. A heart medication to treat an infection.
3. Dose too low. This could occur when a patient is given medication that is not strong enough to get beneficial or therapeutic effects.
4. Dose too high. This could occur when a patient is given medication that is too strong and is causing detrimental effects or is simply not necessary.
5. Adverse drug reaction. This could occur when a patient has an allergic response to a medication.
6. Inappropriate adherence. This could occur when a patient chooses not to or forgets to take a medication.
7. Needs additional drug therapy. This could occur when a patient needs more medication to treat their condition.

== Further breakdown of categories ==
DRPs can be broken down further into the following categories:

=== Indication ===
Requires Additional Drug Therapy

- Untreated condition
- Preventative / prophylactic
- Synergistic / potentiating

Unnecessary Drug Therapy

- No medical indication
- Duplicate therapy
- Non-drug therapy indicated
- Treating avoidable ADR

=== Effectiveness ===
Requires Different Drug Product

- More effective drug available
- Condition refractory to drug
- Dosage form inappropriate
- Not effective for condition

Dosage Too Low

- Wrong dose
- Frequency inappropriate
- Duration inappropriate
- Drug interaction

=== Safety ===
Adverse Drug Reaction

- Undesirable effect
- Unsafe drug for patient
- Dose changed too quickly
- Allergic reaction
- Contraindications present

Dosage Too High

- Wrong dose
- Frequency inappropriate
- Incorrect administration
- Drug interaction

=== Adherence ===
Non-adherence

- Directions not understood
- Patient prefers not to take
- Patient forgets to take
- Drug product too expensive
- Cannot swallow/administer
- Drug product not available
