= World Organization of Family Doctors =

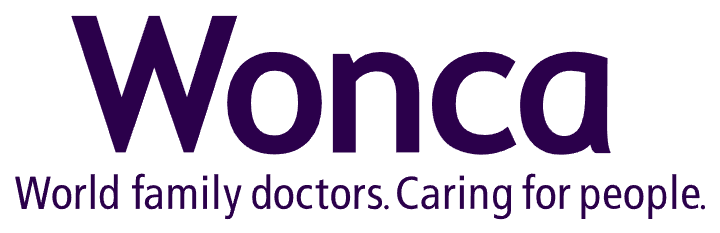
Logo

The World Organization of Family Doctors (WONCA) is a global not-for-profit professional organization representing family physicians and general practitioners from all regions of the world. WONCA's mission is to improve the quality of life of the people of the world through high standards of care in general practice/family medicine.

WONCA is a non-governmental organization in official relations with the World Health Organization (WHO) representing family physicians and the practice of family medicine.

== Organisation ==
WONCA was founded in 1972 and now has over 130 Member Organisations representing some 600,000 family doctors in some 150 countries and territories around the world. WONCA has seven regions – Africa, Asia Pacific, Eastern Mediterranean, Europe, Iberoamericana-CIMF, North America, and South Asia – each with a Regional President and Regional Council. WONCA supports a number of Working Parties, Special Interest Groups, and Young Doctors Movements. These bodies work to progress specific areas of interest to WONCA and its members around the globe. The groups involve hundreds of family doctors in their activities. Over the years they have carried out groundbreaking studies and research, and have produced many important publications. There are currently 11 Working Parties, including Education, Research, Quality Care, and Classification, and ten Special Interest Groups. Young Doctors Movements include "EYFDM" in Europe; "Rajakumar" in Asia Pacific; "Spice Route" in South Asia; "Waynakay" in Iberoamericana; "AfriWON" in Africa; "Al Razi" in Eastern Mediterranean and "Polaris" in North America.

The acronym WONCA is derived from the first five initials of the World Organization of National Colleges, Academies and Academic Associations of General Practitioners/Family Physicians.

The current President of WONCA is Karen Flegg, from Australia. Viviana Martinez-Bianchi was elected president in 2023 and will assume the position in 2025.

== WONCA International Classification Committee ==
The WONCA International Classification Committee has produced the International Classification of Primary Care (ICPC), a clinical coding system for primary healthcare.

== See also ==
- General practitioner (GP)
- World Medical Association (WMA)

== Bibliography ==
- Bentzen N (ed). WONCA international glossary for general/family practice. Fam Pract. 1995; 12:267.

Funk M and Ivbijaro G (eds). Integrating mental health into primary care. WONCA and WHO 2008

Kidd MR (ed). The contribution of family medicine to improving health systems. WONCA 2013
