= International Classification of Primary Care =

Classification method for primary care encounters

International Classification of Primary Care (ICPC)
- Author: WONCA International Classification Committee
- Language: English
- Subject: Medicine
- Publisher: CRC Press
- Publication date: 2020
- ISBN: 9781032053394

The International Classification of Primary Care (ICPC) is a classification method for primary care encounters. The ICPC-3 strives to be a person centered classification for Primary Care, building on the foundations of the ICPC-2. It includes references to existing international standards such as ICD-10, ICD-11, ICF as well as SNOMED CT clinical terminology. It provides a framework for documenting and organizing clinical data from primary care patient contacts.

The ICPC-3 includes codes for the four key elements of healthcare encounters:

- the reason for the encounter (RFE);
- the diagnosis and/or health problem;
- functioning (i.e. information about activities/participation, physiological functions and about personal and environmental factors related to the health problem);
- processes of care.

== History ==
The ICPC was developed by the WONCA International Classification Committee (WICC), and was first published in 1987 by Oxford University Press (OUP). A revision and inclusion of criteria and definitions was published in 1998. The second revision was accepted within the World Health Organization's (WHO) Family of International Classifications. The third revision, ICPC-3, has been adopted by WONCA in December 2020 and endorsed on April 16, 2021 during the WONCA Executive meeting.

The classification was developed in a context of increasing demand for quality information on primary care as part of growing worldwide attention to global primary health care objectives, including the WHO's target of "health for all".

The first version of ICPC, which was published in 1987, is referred to as ICPC-1. A subsequent revision which was published in the 1993 publication The International Classification of Primary Care in the European Community: With a Multi-Language Layer is known as ICPC-E.

The 1998 publication, of version 2, is referred to as ICPC-2. The acronym ICPC-2-E, refers to a revised electronic version, which was released in 2000.

The ICPC-3 Project started January 2018 and published the ICPC-3 in 2020. ICPC-3 supports coding of reason(s) for encounter, symptoms and complaints, diagnoses, health problems, functioning, environmental factors, personal factors related to health and processes of care, all within one classification.

== Browsers ==
The following versions of the ICPC are available at the ICPC-3 Website :

- ICPC-1e (version 1.0)
- ICPC-2e (version 7.0)
- ICPC-3 (International 2024 version)
- ICPC-3 (Portuguese 2024 version)

== See also ==
- Classifications
  - Medical classification
  - Anatomical Therapeutic Chemical Classification System (ATC classification for drugs)
  - Classification of Pharmaco-Therapeutic Referrals (CPR)
  - International Classification of Functioning, Disability and Health (ICF)
  - International Statistical Classification of Diseases and Related Health Problems (ICD)
  - ICPC-2 PLUS
- Health care
  - Family medicine / Family practice
  - General practice / General practitioner
  - Primary care
  - Primary health care
  - Referral (medicine)
- Health informatics
  - Electronic health record
  - International Organization for Standardization Technical Committee on Health Informatics
- World Organization of Family Doctors (WONCA)
  - WONCA International Classification Committee (WICC)

== Bibliography ==
- Napel H. ten, et al. Improving Primary Health Care Data With ICPC-3: From a Medical to a Person-Centered Perspective. The Annals of Family Medicine July 2022, 20 (4) 358-361
