= Classification of Pharmaco-Therapeutic Referrals =

Taxonomy of cases requiring referral

Classification of Pharmaco-Therapeutic Referrals. MEDAFAR
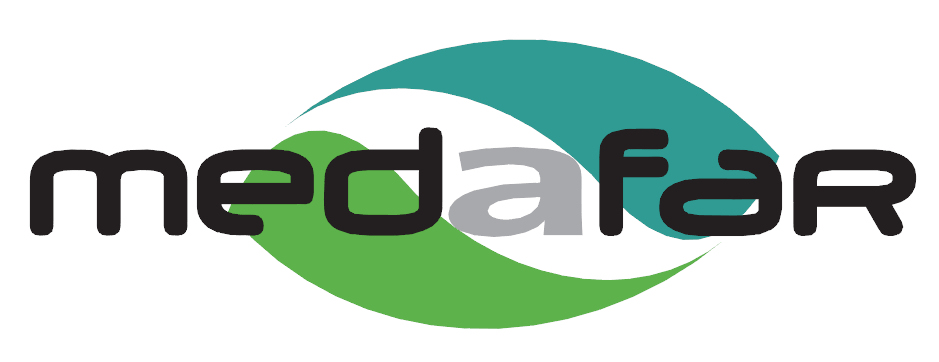
- MEDAFAR logo
- Author: Raimundo Pastor Sánchez, Carmen Alberola Gómez-Escolar, Flor Álvarez de Toledo Saavedra, Nuria Fernández de Cano Martín, Nancy Solá Uthurry.
- Original title: Clasificación de Derivaciones Fármaco-terapéuticas. MEDAFAR
- Language: English
- Subject: Medicine
- Publisher: IMC
- Publication date: 2008
- Publication place: Spain
- Pages: 96
- ISBN: 978-84-691-8426-4

The Classification of Pharmaco-Therapeutic Referrals (CPR) is a taxonomy that defines and groups situations requiring a referral between pharmacists and physicians regarding patients’ pharmacotherapy. It has been published in 2008. It is bilingual: English/Spanish (Clasificación de Derivaciones Fármaco-terapéuticas).

It is a simple and efficient classification of pharmaco-therapeutic referrals between physicians and pharmacists permitting a common inter-professional language. It is adapted to any type of referrals among health professionals, and to increase its specificity it can be combined with ATC codes, ICD-10, and ICPC-2 PLUS.

It is a part of the MEDAFAR Project, whose objective is to improve, through different scientific activities, the coordination processes between physicians and pharmacists working in primary health care.

== Supporting institutions ==
- Pharmaceutical Care Foundation of Spain (Fundación Pharmaceutical Care España)
- Spanish Society of Primary Care Doctors (Sociedad Española de Médicos de Atención Primaria) (SEMERGEN)

== Authors ==
- Raimundo Pastor Sánchez (Family practice, "Miguel de Cervantes" Primary Health Centre SERMAS Alcalá de Henares – Madrid – Spain)
- Carmen Alberola Gómez-Escolar (Pharmacist, Vice-president Fundación Pharmaceutical Care España)
- Flor Álvarez de Toledo Saavedra (Community pharmacist, Past-President Fundación Pharmaceutical Care España)
- Nuria Fernández de Cano Martín (Family practice, "Daroca" Primary Health Centre SERMAS Madrid – Spain)
- Nancy Solá Uthurry (Doctor in Pharmacy, Fundación Pharmaceutical Care España)

== Structure ==
It is structured in 4 chapters (E, I, N, S) and 38 rubrics. The terminology used follows the rules of ICPC-2.

Each rubric consists in an alphanumeric code (the letter corresponds to the chapters and the number to the component) and each title of the rubric (the assigned name) is expressed and explained by:

– A series of terms related with the title of the rubric.

– A definition expressing the meaning of the rubric.

– A list of inclusion criteria and another list with exclusion criteria to select and qualify the contents corresponding to a rubric.

– Some example to illustrate every term.

It also includes a glossary of 51 terms defined by consensus, an alphabetical index with 350 words used in the rubrics; and a standardized model of inter-professional referral form, to facilitate referrals from community pharmacists to primary care physicians.

== Classification of Pharmaco-Therapeutic Referrals MEDAFAR ==
=== E. Effectiveness / efficiency ===
- E 0. Effectiveness / Efficiency, unspecified
- E 1. Indication
- E 2. Prescription and dispensing conditions
- E 3. Active substance / excipient
- E 4. Pharmaceutical form / how supplied
- E 5. Dosage
- E 6. Quality
- E 7. Storage
- E 8. Consumption
- E 9. Outcome.

=== I. Information / health education ===
- I 0. Information / Health education, unspecified
- I 1. Situation / reason for encounter
- I 2. Health problem
- I 3. Complementary examination
- I 4. Risk
- I 5. Pharmacological treatment
- I 6. No pharmacological treatment
- I 7. Treatment goal
- I 8. Socio-healthcare system.

=== N. Need ===
- N 0. Need, unspecified
- N 1. Treatment based on symptoms and/or signs
- N 2. Treatment based on socio–economic-work issues
- N 3. Treatment based on public health issues
- N 4. Prevention
- N 5. Healthcare provision
- N 6. Complementary test for treatment control
- N 7. Administrative activity
- N 8. On patient request (fears, doubts, wants).

=== S. Safety ===
- S 0. Safety, unspecified
- S 1. Toxicity
- S 2. Interaction
- S 3. Allergy
- S 4. Addiction (dependence)
- S 5. Other side effects
- S 6. Contraindication
- S 7. Medicalisation
- S 8. Non-regulate substance
- S 9. Data / confidentiality.

== See also ==
- Pharmaceutical care
- Referral (medicine)

== Bibliography ==
- Pastor Sánchez R, Alberola Gómez-Escolar C, Álvarez de Toledo Saavedra F, Fernández de Cano Martín N, Solá Uthurry N. Clasificación de Derivaciones Fármaco-terapéuticas (CDF). MEDAFAR. Madrid: IMC; 2008. ISBN 978-84-691-8426-4
- Álvarez de Toledo Saavedra F, Fernández de Cano Martín N, coordinadores. MEDAFAR Asma. Madrid: IMC; 2007.
- Álvarez de Toledo Saavedra F, Fernández de Cano Martín N, coordinadores. MEDAFAR Hipertensión. Madrid: IMC; 2007.
- Aranaz JM, Aibar C, Vitaller J, Mira JJ, Orozco D, Terol E, Agra Y. Estudio sobre la seguridad de los pacientes en atención primaria de salud (Estudio APEAS). Madrid: Ministerio de Sanidad y Consumo; 2008.
- Aranaz JM, Aibar C, Vitaller J, Ruiz P. Estudio Nacional sobre los Efectos Adversos ligados a la Hospitalización. ENEAS 2005. Madrid: Ministerio de Sanidad y Consumo; 2006.
- Criterios de derivación del farmacéutico al médico general/familia, ante mediciones esporádicas de presión arterial. Consenso entre la Sociedad Valenciana de Hipertensión y Riesgo Vascular (SVHTAyFV) y la Sociedad de Farmacia Comunitaria de la Comunidad Valenciana (SFaC-CV). 2007.
- Fleming DM (ed). The European study of referrals from primary to secondary care. Exeter: Royal College of General Practitioners; 1992.
- Foro de Atención Farmacéutica. Documento de consenso 2008. Madrid: MSC, RANF, CGCOF, SEFAP, SEFAC, SEFH, FPCE, GIAFUG. 2008.
- García Olmos L. Análisis de la demanda derivada en las consultas de medicina general en España. Tesis doctoral. Madrid: Universidad Autónoma de Madrid; 1993.
- Garjón Parra J, Gorricho Mendívil J. Seguridad del paciente: cuidado con los errores de medicación. Boletín de Información Farmacoterapéutica de Navarra. 2010;18(3)
- Gérvas J. Introducción a las classificaciones en Atención Primaria, con una valoración técnica de los "Consensos de Granada". Pharm Care Esp. 2003; 5(2):98-104.
- Hospital Ramón y Cajal, Área 4 Atención Primaria de Madrid. Guía Farmacoterapéutica. Madrid; 2005. CD-ROM.
- Ley 29/2006, de 26 de julio, de garantías y uso racional de los medicamentos y productos sanitarios. BOE. 2006 julio 27; (178): 28122–65.
- Ley 41/2002, de 14 de noviembre, básica reguladora de la autonomía del paciente y de derechos y obligaciones en materia de información y documentación clínica. BOE. 2002 noviembre 15; (274): 40126–32.
- Ley Orgánica 15/1999, de 13 de diciembre, de Protección de Datos de Carácter Personal. BOE. 1999 diciembre 14; (298): 43088–99.
- Organización Médica Colegial. Código de ética y deontología médica. Madrid: OMC; 1999.
- Palacio Lapuente F. Actuaciones para la mejora de la seguridad del paciente en atención primaria [editorial]. FMC. 2008; 15(7): 405–7.
- Panel de consenso ad hoc. Consenso de Granada sobre Problemas Relacionados con medicamentos. Pharm Care Esp. 1999; 1(2):107-12.
- Prado Prieto L, García Olmos L, Rodríguez Salvanés F, Otero Puime A. Evaluación de la demanda derivada en atención primaria. Aten Primaria. 2005; 35:146-51.
- Starfield B. Research in general practice: co-morbidity, referrals, and the roles of general practitioners and specialists. SEMERGEN. 2003; 29(Supl 1):7-16.
- WONCA Classification Committee. An international glossary for general/family practice. Fam Pract. 1995; 12(3): 341–69.
- World Alliance for Patient Safety. International Classification for Patient Safety (ICPS). 2007.
