= ICPC-2 PLUS =

ICPC-2 PLUS is an extended terminology classified to ICPC-2 International Classification of Primary Care, which aids data entry, retrieval and analysis. ICPC-2 PLUS takes into account the frequency distribution of problems seen in primary health care. It allows for the classification of the patient's reason for encounter (RFE), the problems/diagnosis managed, primary care interventions, and the ordering of the data of the primary care session in an episode of care structure.

ICPC-2 PLUS provides a list of possible terms matching a keyword (or start of a keyword) entered by the user. The user then selects the most appropriate term. Each term is already classified to ICPC-2 rubrics and a system of additional groupers that may include terms from multiple ICPC-2 rubrics.

Each term has one or more keywords linked to it which may include abbreviations, synonyms, generics or specifics. The keyword searching is thus much broader, faster and better controlled than text mining of free text and labels. Instead of guessing what the physician meant by a term (in free text) prior to classification, the physician is actually prompted with a small list of terms to select from which are already classified.

The product also includes a "natural language" label for each term which can be used for reports and letters.

Note: The PLUS extension mentioned here is not part of the ICPC-2 standard. The World Organization of Family Doctors (WONCA) and the WONCA International Classification Committee (WICC) have no control over it although they do have control over the ICPC classification which the PLUS extension makes use of. It is similar to the difference between a car and fuel.

== History ==
ICPC-2 PLUS was the successor to 'ICPC PLUS' and were both designed by the Family Medicine Research Centre(FMRC) for use in Australia. ICPC 2 PLUS responsibility was transferred to the NCCH in July 2016 which continues to update and support ICPC-2 PLUS.

ICPC is being developed by the WONCA International Classification Committee (WICC), and the first version was published as ICPC-1 in 1987 by Oxford University Press (OUP), and a revision and inclusion of criteria and definitions, was published in 1998 as ICPC-2.

== See also ==
- Classification of Pharmaco-Therapeutic Referrals
- International Statistical Classification of Diseases and Related Health Problems (ICD)
- International Classification of Primary Care (ICPC-2)
- Medical classification
- Medical record
- Electronic medical record
- WONCA International Classification Committee (WICC)
