= Referral (medicine) =

Transfer of a patient between clinicians

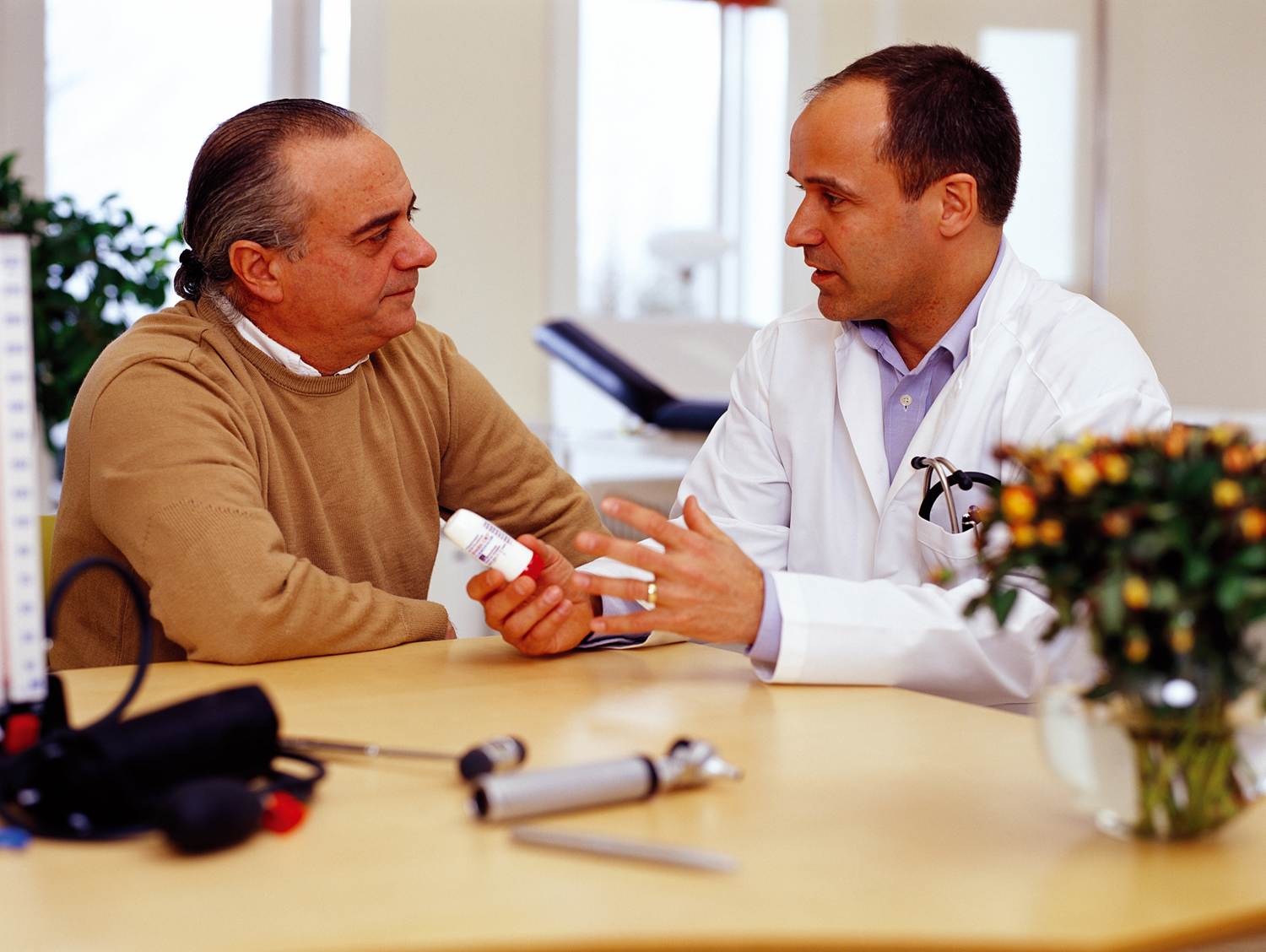
Patients can be referred to another medical clinic by request

In medicine, referral is the transfer of care for a patient from one clinician or clinic to another by request.

Tertiary care is usually done by referral from primary or secondary medical care personnel.

In the field of sexually transmitted diseases (STDs), referral also means the informing of a partner of a patient diagnosed STD of the potential exposure. Patient referral is where patients directly inform their partners of their exposure to infection. An alternative is provider referral, where trained health department personnel locate partners on the basis of the names, descriptions, and addresses provided by the patient to inform the partner.

== See also ==
- Classification of Pharmaco-Therapeutic Referrals (CPR)
- General practice
- Family medicine
- Family practice
- Primary care
- International Classification of Primary Care (ICPC-2)
- ICPC-2 PLUS
- Classification of Pharmaco-Therapeutic Referrals
- Walk-in clinic
- GP Liaison
