= Adverse drug reaction =

Harmful, unintended response to medications

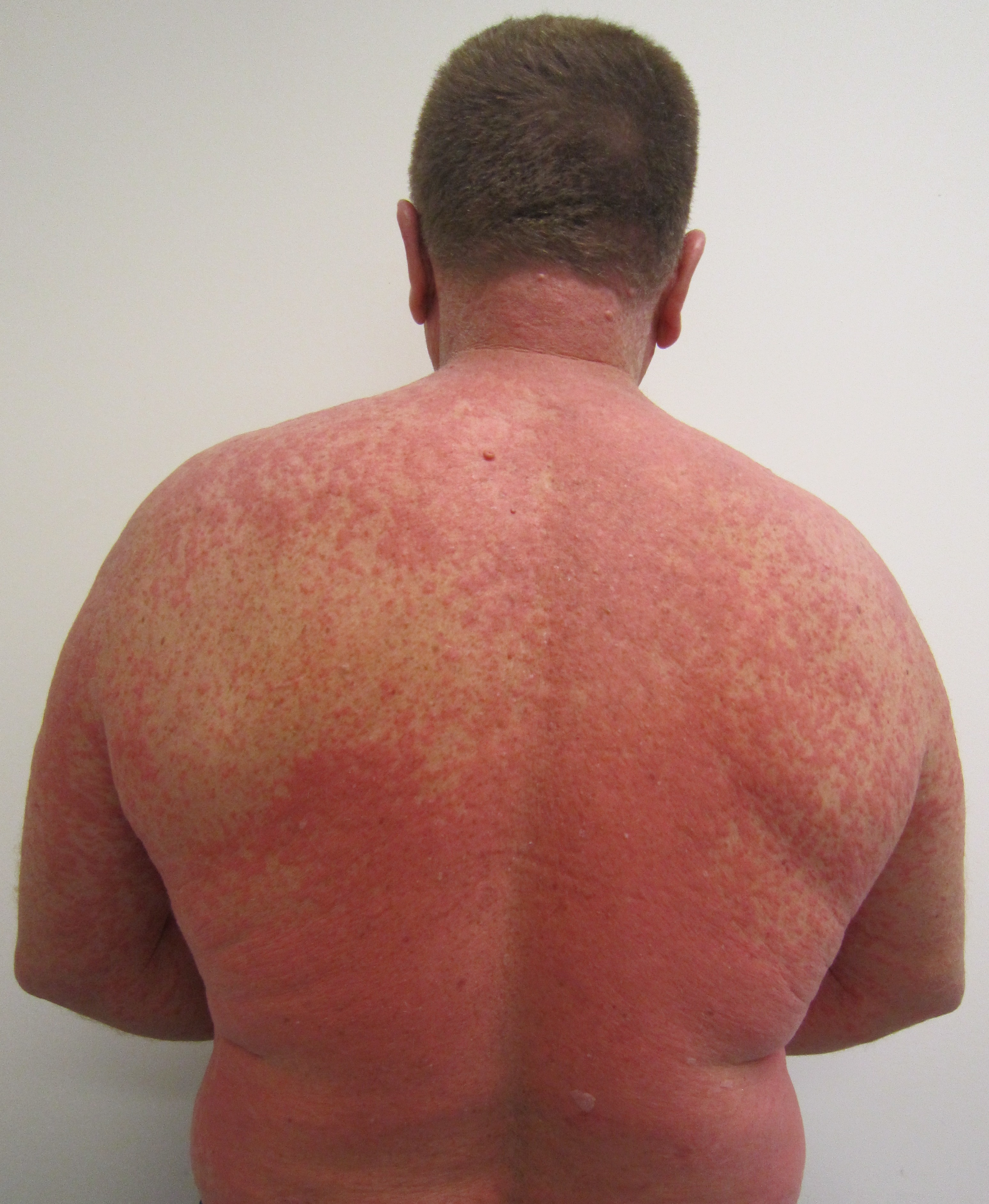
- A rash due to a drug reaction

An adverse drug reaction (ADR) is an unintended medical event, which can potentially be associated with taking a medication. It can be disadvantageous or beneficial for the patient. ADRs may occur following a single dose or prolonged administration of a drug or may result from the combination of two or more drugs. The meaning of this term differs from the term "side effect" because side effects are proven by thorough investigation to have relationship to the drug. The study of ADRs is the concern of the field known as pharmacovigilance.

An adverse event (AE) refers to any unexpected and inappropriate occurrence at the time a drug is used, whether or not the event is associated with the administration of the drug. An ADR is a special type of AE in which a causative relationship can be shown or is suspected. ADRs are only one type of medication-related harm. Another type of medication-related harm type includes not taking prescribed medications, known as non-adherence. Non-adherence to medications can lead to death and other negative outcomes. Adverse drug reactions require the use of a medication.

== Classification ==
=== Traditional ===
- Type A: augmented pharmacological effects, which are dose-dependent and predictable

Type A reactions, which constitute approximately 80% of adverse drug reactions, are usually a consequence of the drug's primary pharmacological effect (e.g., bleeding when using the anticoagulant warfarin) or a low therapeutic index of the drug (e.g., nausea from digoxin), and they are therefore predictable. They are dose-related and usually mild, although they may be serious or even fatal (e.g. intracranial bleeding from warfarin). Such reactions are usually due to inappropriate dosage, especially when drug elimination is impaired. The term side effects may be applied to minor type A reactions.

- Type B: Type B reactions are not dose-dependent and are not predictable, and so may be called idiosyncratic. These reactions can be due to particular elements within the person or the environment.

Types A and B were proposed in the 1970s, and the other types were proposed subsequently when the first two proved insufficient to classify ADRs.

Other types of adverse drug reactions are Type C, Type D, Type E, and Type F. Type C was categorized for chronic adverse drug reactions, Type D for delayed adverse drug reactions, Type E for withdrawal adverse drug reactions, and Type F for failure of therapy as an adverse drug reaction. Adverse drug reactions can also be categorized using time-relatedness, dose-relatedness, and susceptibility, which collectively are called the DoTS classification.

=== Seriousness ===
The U.S Food and Drug Administration defines a serious adverse event as one when the patient outcome is one of the following:

- Death
- Life-threatening
- Hospitalization (initial or prolonged)
- Disability — significant, persistent, or permanent change, impairment, damage or disruption in the patient's body function/structure, physical activities or quality of life.
- Congenital abnormality
- Requires intervention to prevent permanent impairment or damage

Severity is a measure of the intensity of the adverse event in question. The terms "severe" and "serious", when applied to adverse events, are technically very different. They are easily confused but can not be used interchangeably, requiring care in usage. Seriousness usually indicates patient outcome (such as negative outcomes including disability, long-term effects, and death).

In adverse drug reactions, the seriousness of the reaction is important for reporting.

== Location ==
Some ocular antihypertensives cause systemic effects, although they are administered locally as eye drops, since a fraction escapes to the systemic circulation.

== Mechanisms ==
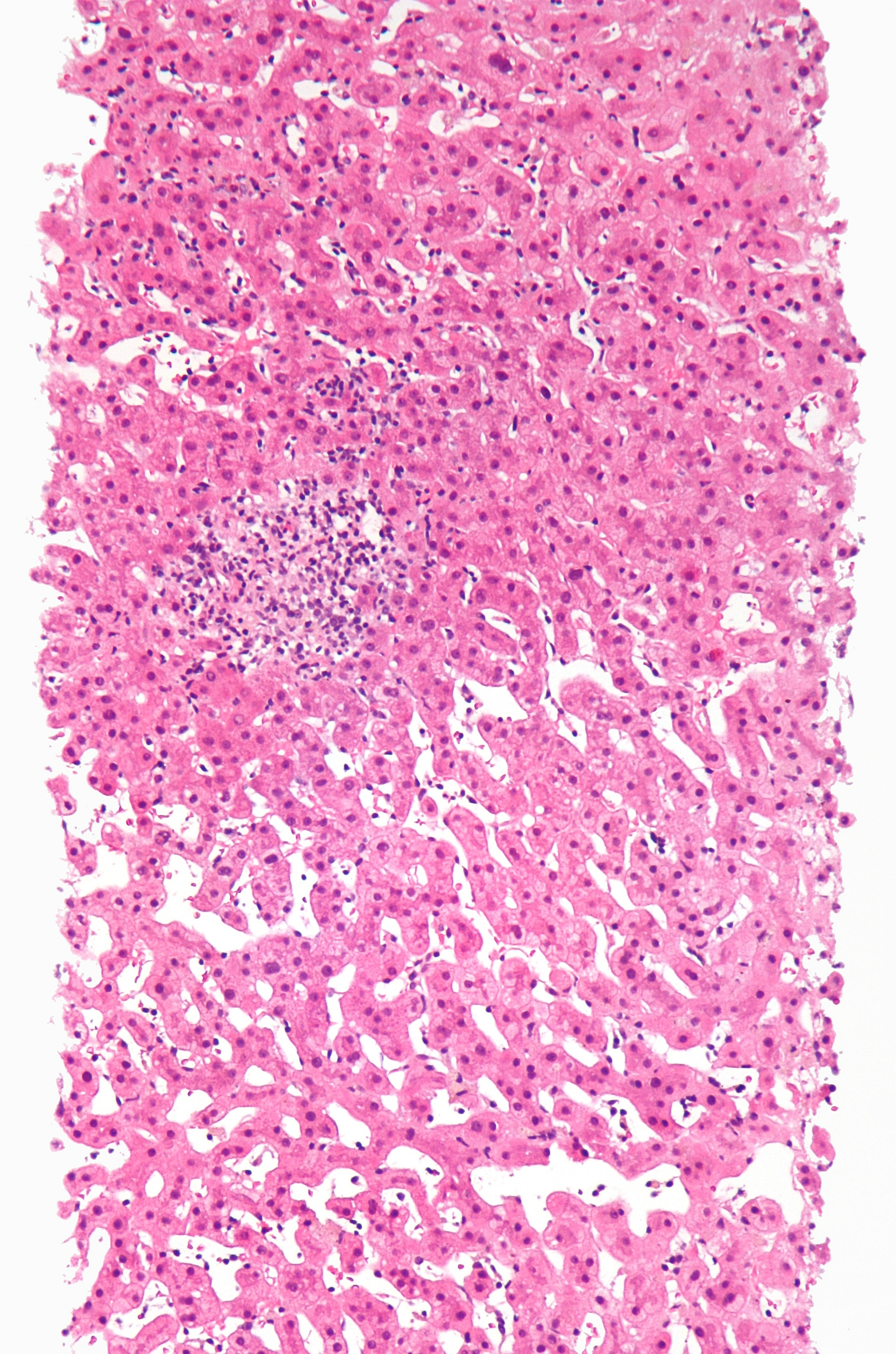
Adverse drug reaction leading to hepatitis (drug-induced hepatitis) with granulomata. Other causes were excluded with extensive investigations. Liver biopsy. H&E stain.

=== Abnormal pharmacokinetics ===
==== Comorbid disease states ====
Various diseases, especially those that cause renal or hepatic insufficiency, may alter drug metabolism. Resources are available that report changes in a drug's metabolism due to disease states.

The Medication Appropriateness Tool for Comorbid Health Conditions in Dementia (MATCH-D) criteria warns that people with dementia are more likely to experience adverse effects, and that they are less likely to be able to reliably report symptoms.

==== Genetic factors ====
Pharmacogenomics includes how genes can predict potential adverse drug reactions. However, pharmacogenomics is not limited to adverse events (of any type), but also looks at how genes may impact other responses to medications, such as low/no effect or expected/normal responses (especially based on drug metabolism).

Abnormal drug metabolism may be due to inherited factors of either Phase I oxidation or Phase II conjugation.

===== Phase I reactions =====
Phase I reactions include metabolism by cytochrome P450. Patients have abnormal metabolism by cytochrome P450 due to either inheriting abnormal alleles or due to drug interactions. Tables are available to check for drug interactions due to P450 interactions.

Inheriting abnormal butyrylcholinesterase (pseudocholinesterase) may affect metabolism of drugs such as succinylcholine.

===== Phase II reactions =====
Inheriting abnormal N-acetyltransferase which conjugated some drugs to facilitate excretion may affect the metabolism of drugs such as isoniazid, hydralazine, and procainamide.

Inheriting abnormal thiopurine S-methyltransferase may affect the metabolism of the thiopurine drugs mercaptopurine and azathioprine.

===== Protein binding =====
Protein binding interactions are usually transient and mild until a new steady state is achieved. These are mainly for drugs without much first-pass liver metabolism. The principal plasma proteins for drug binding are:

1. albumin
2. α1-acid glycoprotein
3. lipoproteins

Some drug interactions with warfarin are due to changes in protein binding.

=== Drug interactions ===
The risk of drug interactions is increased with polypharmacy, especially in older adults.

==== Additive drug effects ====
Two or more drugs that contribute to the same mechanism in the body can have additive toxic or adverse effects. One example of this is multiple medications administered concurrently that prolong the QT interval, such as antiarrhythmics like sotalol and some macrolide antibiotics, such as systemic azithromycin.

Another example of additive effects for adverse drug reactions is in serotonin toxicity (serotonin syndrome). If medications that cause increased serotonin levels are combined, they can cause serotonin toxicity (though therapeutic doses of one agent that increases serotonin levels can cause serotonin toxicity in certain cases and individuals). Some of the medications that can contribute to serotonin toxicity include MAO inhibitors, SSRIs, and tricyclic antidepressants.

==== Altered metabolism ====
Some medications can either inhibit or induce key drug metabolizing enzymes or drug transporters, which when combined with other medications that utilize the same proteins can lead to either toxic or sub-therapeutic adverse effects. One example of this is a patient taking a cytochrome P450 3A4 (CYP3A4) inhibitor such as the antibiotic clarithromycin, as well as another medication metabolized by CYP3A4 such as the anticoagulant apixaban, which results in elevated blood concentrations of apixaban and greater risk of serious bleeds. Additionally, Clarithromycin is a permeability glycoprotein (P-gp) efflux pump inhibitor, which when given with apixaban (a substrate for P-gp) will lead to increased absorption of apixaban, resulting in the same adverse effects as with CYP3A4 inhibition.

== Management ==
=== Assessing causality ===
Causality assessment is used to determine the likelihood that a drug caused a suspected ADR. There are a number of different methods used to judge causation, including the Naranjo algorithm, the Venulet algorithm and the WHO causality term assessment criteria. Each have pros and cons associated with their use and most require some level of expert judgement to apply. An ADR should not be labeled as 'certain' unless the ADR abates with a challenge-dechallenge-rechallenge protocol (stopping and starting the agent in question). The chronology of the onset of the suspected ADR is important, as another substance or factor may be implicated as a cause; co-prescribed medications and underlying psychiatric conditions may be factors in the ADR.

Assigning causality to a specific agent often proves difficult, unless the event is found during a clinical study or large databases are used. Both methods have difficulties and can be fraught with error. Even in clinical studies, some ADRs may be missed as large numbers of test individuals are required to find a specific adverse drug reaction, especially for rare ADRs. Psychiatric ADRs are often missed as they are grouped together in the questionnaires used to assess the population.

=== Monitoring bodies ===
Many countries have official bodies that monitor drug safety and reactions. On an international level, the WHO runs the Uppsala Monitoring Centre. The European Union runs the European Medicines Agency (EMA). In the United States, the Food and Drug Administration (FDA) is responsible for monitoring post-marketing studies. The FDA has a reporting system called the FDA Adverse Event Reporting System, where individuals can report adverse drug events. Healthcare professionals, consumers, and the pharmaceutical industry can all submit information to this system. For health products marketed in Canada, a branch of Health Canada called The Canada Vigilance Program is responsible for surveillance. Both healthcare professionals and consumers can report to this program. In Australia, the Therapeutic Goods Administration (TGA) conducts postmarket monitoring of therapeutic products. In the UK, a monitoring system called the Yellow Card Scheme was established in 1964. The Yellow Card Scheme was set up to surveil medications and other health products.

== Epidemiology ==
A study by the Agency for Healthcare Research and Quality (AHRQ) found that in 2011, sedatives and hypnotics were a leading source for adverse drug events seen in the hospital setting. Approximately 2.8% of all ADEs present on admission and 4.4% of ADEs that originated during a hospital stay were caused by a sedative or hypnotic drug. A second study by AHRQ found that in 2011, the most common specifically identified causes of adverse drug events that originated during hospital stays in the U.S. were steroids, antibiotics, opiates/narcotics, and anticoagulants. Patients treated in urban teaching hospitals had higher rates of ADEs involving antibiotics and opiates/narcotics compared to those treated in urban nonteaching hospitals. Those treated in private, nonprofit hospitals had higher rates of most ADE causes compared to patients treated in public or private, for-profit hospitals.

Medication related harm (MRH) is common after hospital discharge in older adults, but methodological inconsistencies between studies and a paucity of data on risk factors limits clear understanding of the epidemiology. There was a wide range in incidence, from 0.4% to 51.2% of participants, and 35% to 59% of harm was preventable. Medication related harm incidence within 30 days after discharge ranged from 167 to 500 events per 1,000 individuals discharged (17–51% of individuals).

In the U.S., females had a higher rate of ADEs involving opiates and narcotics than males in 2011, while male patients had a higher rate of anticoagulant ADEs. Nearly 8 in 1,000 adults aged 65 years or older experienced one of the four most common ADEs (steroids, antibiotics, opiates/narcotics, and anticoagulants) during hospitalization. A study showed that 48% of patients had an adverse drug reaction to at least one drug, and pharmacist involvement helps to pick up adverse drug reactions.

In 2012, McKinsey & Company concluded that the cost of the 50-100 million preventable error-related adverse drug events would be between US$18–115 billion.

An article published in The Journal of the American Medical Association (JAMA) in 2016 reported adverse drug event statistics from emergency departments around the United States in 2013-2014. From this article, an estimated prevalence of adverse drug events that were presented to the emergency department (ED) was 4 events out of every 1000 people. This article reported that 57.1% of these adverse drug events presented to the ED were in females. As well, out of all of the adverse drug events presented to the emergency department documented in this article, 17.6% were from anticoagulants, 16.1% were from antibiotics, and 13.3% from diabetic agents.

== See also ==
- Alleged problems in the drug approval process (US)
- Classification of Pharmaco-Therapeutic Referrals
- Drug therapy problems
- EudraVigilance (European Union)
- History of pharmacy
- Iatrogenesis
- Lethal dose
- List of withdrawn drugs
- Paradoxical reaction
- Polypharmacy
- Toxicity
- Toxicology
- The Medical Letter on Drugs and Therapeutics
- Yellow Card Scheme (UK)
