= Cancer biomarker =

Substance or process that is indicative of the presence of cancer in the body

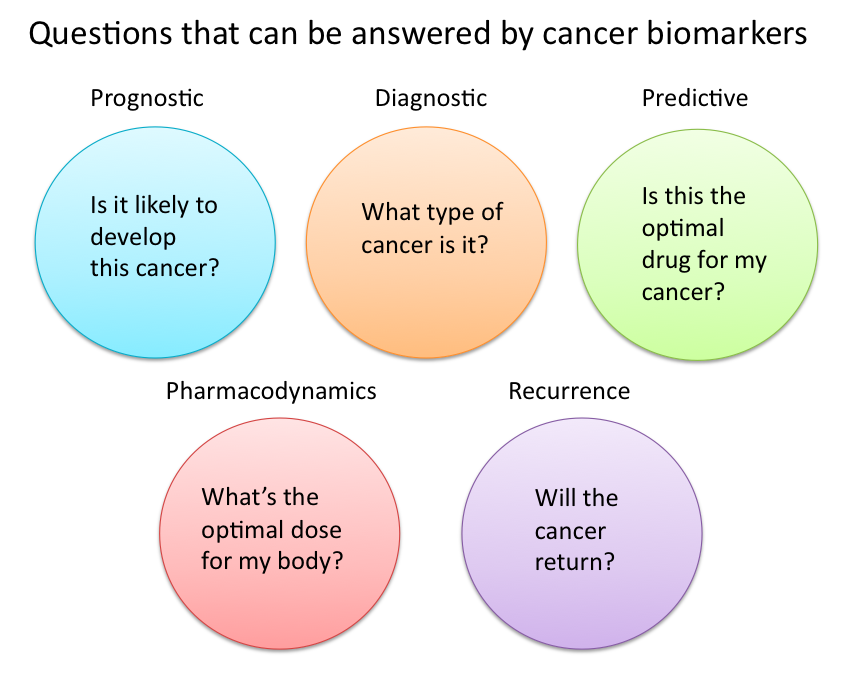
Questions that can be answered by biomarkers

A cancer biomarker refers to a substance or process that is indicative of the presence of cancer in the body. A biomarker may be a molecule secreted by a tumor or a specific response of the body to the presence of cancer. Genetic, epigenetic, proteomic, glycomic, and imaging biomarkers can be used for cancer diagnosis, prognosis, and epidemiology. Ideally, such biomarkers can be assayed in non-invasively collected biofluids like blood or serum.

Cancer is a disease that affects society at a world-wide level. By testing for biomarkers, early diagnosis can be given to prevent deaths.

While numerous challenges exist in translating biomarker research into the clinical space; a number of gene and protein based biomarkers have already been used at some point in patient care; including, AFP (liver cancer), BCR-ABL (chronic myeloid leukemia), BRCA1 / BRCA2 (breast/ovarian cancer), BRAF V600E (melanoma/colorectal cancer), CA-125 (ovarian cancer), CA19.9 (pancreatic cancer), CEA (colorectal cancer), EGFR (Non-small-cell lung carcinoma), HER-2 (Breast Cancer), KIT (gastrointestinal stromal tumor), PSA (prostate specific antigen) (prostate cancer), S100 (melanoma), and many others. Mutant proteins themselves detected by selected reaction monitoring (SRM) have been reported to be the most specific biomarkers for cancers because they can only come from an existing tumor. About 40% of cancers can be cured if detected early through examinations.

== Definitions of cancer biomarkers ==
Organizations and publications vary in their definition of biomarker. In many areas of medicine, biomarkers are limited to proteins identifiable or measurable in the blood or urine. However, the term is often used to cover any molecular, biochemical, physiological, or anatomical property that can be quantified or measured.

The National Cancer Institute (NCI), in particular, defines biomarker as a: "A biological molecule found in blood, other body fluids, or tissues that is a sign of a normal or abnormal process, or of a condition or disease. A biomarker may be used to see how well the body responds to a treatment for a disease or condition. Also called molecular marker and signature molecule."

In cancer research and medicine, biomarkers are used in three primary ways:

1. To help diagnose conditions, as in the case of identifying early stage cancers (diagnostic)
2. To forecast how aggressive a condition is, as in the case of determining a patient's ability to fare in the absence of treatment (prognostic)
3. To predict how well a patient will respond to treatment (predictive)

== Role of biomarkers in cancer research and medicine ==
=== Uses of biomarkers in cancer medicine ===
==== Risk assessment ====
Cancer biomarkers, particular those associated with genetic mutations or epigenetic alterations, often offer a quantitative way to determine when individuals are predisposed to particular types of cancers. Notable examples of potentially predictive cancer biomarkers include mutations on genes KRAS, p53, EGFR, erbB2 for colorectal, esophageal, liver, and pancreatic cancer; mutations of genes BRCA1 and BRCA2 for breast and ovarian cancer; abnormal methylation of tumor suppressor genes p16, CDKN2B, and p14ARF for brain cancer; hypermethylation of MYOD1, CDH1, and CDH13 for cervical cancer; and hypermethylation of p16, p14, and RB1, for oral cancer.

==== Diagnosis ====
Cancer biomarkers can also be useful in establishing a specific diagnosis. This is particularly the case when there is a need to determine whether tumors are of primary or metastatic origin. To make this distinction, researchers can screen the chromosomal alterations found on cells located in the primary tumor site against those found in the secondary site. If the alterations match, the secondary tumor can be identified as metastatic; whereas if the alterations differ, the secondary tumor can be identified as a distinct primary tumor. For example, people with tumors have high levels of circulating tumor DNA (ctDNA) due to tumor cells that have gone through apoptosis. This tumor marker can be detected in the blood, saliva, or urine. The possibility of identifying an effective biomarker for early cancer diagnosis has recently been questioned, in light of the high molecular heterogeneity of tumors observed by next-generation sequencing studies.

==== Prognosis and treatment predictions ====
Another use of biomarkers in cancer medicine is for disease prognosis, which take place after an individual has been diagnosed with cancer. Here biomarkers can be useful in determining the aggressiveness of an identified cancer as well as its likelihood of responding to a given treatment. In part, this is because tumors exhibiting particular biomarkers may be responsive to treatments tied to that biomarker's expression or presence. Examples of such prognostic biomarkers include elevated levels of metallopeptidase inhibitor 1 (TIMP1), a marker associated with more aggressive forms of multiple myeloma, elevated estrogen receptor (ER) and/or progesterone receptor (PR) expression, markers associated with better overall survival in patients with breast cancer; HER2/neu gene amplification, a marker indicating a breast cancer will likely respond to trastuzumab treatment; a mutation in exon 11 of the proto-oncogene c-KIT, a marker indicating a gastrointestinal stromal tumor (GIST) will likely respond to imatinib treatment; and mutations in the tyrosine kinase domain of EGFR1, a marker indicating a patient's non-small-cell lung carcinoma (NSCLC) will likely respond to gefitinib or erlotinib treatment.

==== Pharmacodynamics and pharmacokinetics ====
Cancer biomarkers can also be used to determine the most effective treatment regime for a particular person's cancer. Because of differences in each person's genetic makeup, some people metabolize or change the chemical structure of drugs differently. In some cases, decreased metabolism of certain drugs can create dangerous conditions in which high levels of the drug accumulate in the body. As such, drug dosing decisions in particular cancer treatments can benefit from screening for such biomarkers. An example is the gene encoding the enzyme thiopurine methyl-transferase (TPMPT). Individuals with mutations in the TPMT gene are unable to metabolize large amounts of the leukemia drug, mercaptopurine, which potentially causes a fatal drop in white blood count for such patients. Patients with TPMT mutations are thus recommended to be given a lower dose of mercaptopurine for safety considerations.

==== Monitoring treatment response ====
Cancer biomarkers have also shown utility in monitoring how well a treatment is working over time. Much research is going into this particular area, since successful biomarkers have the potential of providing significant cost reduction in patient care, as the current image-based tests such as CT and MRI for monitoring tumor status are highly costly.

One notable biomarker garnering significant attention is the protein biomarker S100-beta in monitoring the response of melanoma. In such melanomas, melanocytes, the cells that make pigment in our skin, produce the protein S100-beta in high concentrations dependent on the number of cancer cells. Response to treatment is thus associated with reduced levels of S100-beta in the blood of such individuals.

Similarly, additional laboratory research has shown that tumor cells undergoing apoptosis can release cellular components such as cytochrome c, nucleosomes, cleaved cytokeratin-18, and E-cadherin. Studies have found that these macromolecules and others can be found in circulation during cancer therapy, providing a potential source of clinical metrics for monitoring treatment.

==== Recurrence ====
Cancer biomarkers can also offer value in predicting or monitoring cancer recurrence. The Oncotype DX® breast cancer assay is one such test used to predict the likelihood of breast cancer recurrence. This test is intended for women with early-stage (Stage I or II), node-negative, estrogen receptor-positive (ER+) invasive breast cancer who will be treated with hormone therapy. Oncotype DX looks at a panel of 21 genes in cells taken during tumor biopsy. The results of the test are given in the form of a recurrence score that indicates likelihood of recurrence at 10 years.

=== Uses of biomarkers in cancer research ===
==== Developing drug targets ====
In addition to their use in cancer medicine, biomarkers are often used throughout the cancer drug discovery process. For instance, in the 1960s, researchers discovered the majority of patients with chronic myelogenous leukemia possessed a particular genetic abnormality on chromosomes 9 and 22 dubbed the Philadelphia chromosome. When these two chromosomes combine they create a cancer-causing gene known as BCR-ABL. In such patients, this gene acts as the principle initial point in all of the physiological manifestations of the leukemia. For many years, the BCR-ABL was simply used as a biomarker to stratify a certain subtype of leukemia. However, drug developers were eventually able to develop imatinib, a powerful drug that effectively inhibited this protein and significantly decreased production of cells containing the Philadelphia chromosome.

==== Surrogate endpoints ====
Another promising area of biomarker application is in the area of surrogate endpoints. In this application, biomarkers act as stand-ins for the effects of a drug on cancer progression and survival. Ideally, the use of validated biomarkers would prevent patients from having to undergo tumor biopsies and lengthy clinical trials to determine if a new drug worked. In the current standard of care, the metric for determining a drug's effectiveness is to check if it has decreased cancer progression in humans and ultimately whether it prolongs survival. However, successful biomarker surrogates could save substantial time, effort, and money if failing drugs could be eliminated from the development pipeline before being brought to clinical trials.

Some ideal characteristics of surrogate endpoint biomarkers include:

- Biomarker should be involved in process that causes the cancer
- Changes in biomarker should correlate with changes in the disease
- Levels of biomarkers should be high enough that they can be measured easily and reliably
- Levels or presence of biomarker should readily distinguish between normal, cancerous, and precancerous tissue
- Effective treatment of the cancer should change the level of the biomarker
- Level of the biomarker should not change spontaneously or in response to other factors not related to the successful treatment of the cancer

Two areas in particular that are receiving attention as surrogate markers include circulating tumor cells (CTCs) and circulating miRNAs. Both these markers are associated with the number of tumor cells present in the blood, and as such, are hoped to provide a surrogate for tumor progression and metastasis. However, significant barriers to their adoption include the difficulty of enriching, identifying, and measuring CTC and miRNA levels in blood. New technologies and research are likely necessary for their translation into clinical care.

== Types of cancer biomarkers ==
=== Molecular cancer biomarkers ===
| Tumor type | Biomarker |
|---|---|
| Breast | ER/PR (estrogen receptor/progesteron receptor) |
| Breast | HER-2/neu |
| Colorectal | EGFR |
| Colorectal | KRAS |
| Colorectal | UGT1A1 |
| Gastric | HER-2/neu |
| GIST | c-KIT |
| Leukemia/lymphoma | CD20 |
| Leukemia/lymphoma | CD30 |
| Leukemia/lymphoma | FIP1L1-PDGFRalpha |
| Leukemia/lymphoma | PDGFR |
| Leukemia/lymphoma | Philadelphia chromosome (BCR/ABL) |
| Leukemia/lymphoma | PML/RAR-alpha |
| Leukemia/lymphoma | TPMT |
| Leukemia/lymphoma | UGT1A1 |
| Lung | EML4/ALK |
| Lung | EGFR |
| Lung | KRAS |
| Melanoma | BRAF |
| Pancreas | Elevated levels of leucine, isoleucine and valine |
| Ovaries | CA-125 |

Other examples of biomarkers:

- Tumor suppressors lost in cancer
  - Examples: BRCA1, BRCA2
- RNA
  - Examples: mRNA, microRNA
- Proteins found in body fluids or tissue.
  - Examples: Prostate-specific antigen, and CA-125
- Antibodies to cancer antigens
  - Examples: Merkel cell polyomavirus
- DNA
  - Examples: Circulating Tumor DNA (ctDNA)

== Cancer biomarkers without specificity ==
Not all cancer biomarkers have to be specific to types of cancer. Some biomarkers found in the circulatory system can be used to determine an abnormal growth of cells present in the body. All these types of biomarkers can be identified through diagnostic blood tests, which is one of the main reasons to get regularly health tested. By getting regularly tested, many health issues such as cancer can be discovered at an early stage, preventing many deaths.

The neutrophil-to-lymphocyte ratio has been shown to be a non-specific determinant for many cancers. This ratio focuses on the activity of two components of the immune system that are involved in inflammatory response which is shown to be higher in presence of malignant tumors. Additionally, basic fibroblast growth factor (bFGF) is a protein that is involved in the proliferation of cells. Unfortunately, it has been shown that in the presence of tumors it is highly active which has led to the conclusion that it may help malignant cells reproduce at faster rates. Research has shown that anti-bFGF antibodies can be used to help treat tumors from many origins. Moreover, insulin-like growth factor (IGF-R) is involved in cell proliferation and growth. It has is possible that it is involved in inhibiting apoptosis, programmed cell death due to some defect. Due to this, the levels of IGF-R can be increased when cancer such as breast, prostate, lung, and colorectum is present.

| Biomarker | Description | Biosensor used |
|---|---|---|
| NLR (neutrophil-to-lymphocyte ratio) | Elevates with inflammation caused by cancer | No |
| Basic Fibroblast Growth Factor (bFGF) | This level increases when a tumor is present, helps with the fast reproduction of tumor cells | Electrochemical |
| Insulin-like Growth Factor (IGF-R) | High activity in cancer cells, help reproduction | Electrochemical Impedance Spectroscopy Sensor |

== See also ==
- Tumor marker
