= Cancer pharmacogenomics =

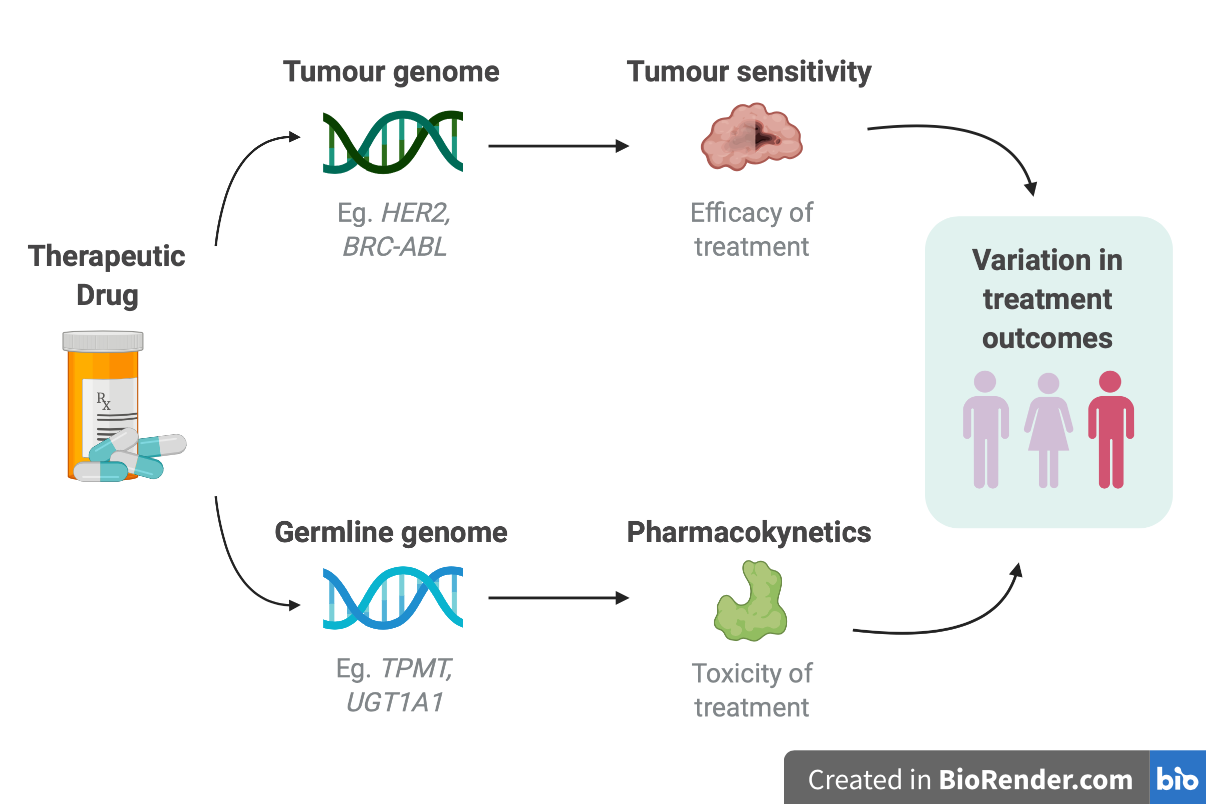
Aspects of cancer pharmacogenomics include the consideration of the tumor genome and the germline genome to make better decisions on cancer treatment.

Cancer pharmacogenomics is the study of how variances in the genome influences an individual's response to different cancer drug treatments. It is a subset of the broader field of pharmacogenomics, which is the area of study aimed at understanding how genetic variants influence drug efficacy and toxicity.

Cancer is a genetic disease where changes to genes can cause cells to grow and divide out of control. Each cancer can have a unique combination of genetic mutations, and even cells within the same tumour may have different genetic changes. In clinical settings, it has commonly been observed that the same types and doses of treatment can result in substantial differences in efficacy and toxicity across patients. Thus, the application of pharmacogenomics within the field of cancer can offer key advantages for personalizing cancer therapy, minimizing treatment toxicity, and maximizing treatment efficacy. This can include choosing drugs that target specific mutations within cancer cells, identifying patients at risk for severe toxicity to a drug, and identifying treatments that a patient is most likely to benefit from. Applying pharmacogenomics within cancer has considerable differences compared to other complex diseases, as there are two genomes that need to be considered - the germline and the tumour. The germline genome considers inter-individual inherited genetic variations, and the tumour genome considers any somatic mutations that accrue as a cancer evolves. The accumulation of somatic mutations within the tumour genome represents variation in disease, and plays a major role in understanding how individuals will respond to treatments. Additionally, the germline genome affects toxicity reactions to a specific treatment due to its influence on drug exposure. Specifically, pharmacokinetic genes participate in the inactivation and elimination of active compounds. Therefore, differences within the germline genome should also be considered.

== Strategies ==
Advances in cancer diagnostics and treatment have shifted the use of traditional methods of physical examination, in vivo, and histopathological analysis to assessment of cancer drivers, mutations, and targetable genomic biomarkers. There are an increasing number of genomic variants being studied and identified as potential therapeutically actionable targets and drug metabolism modifiers. Thus, a patient's genomic information, in addition to information about the patient's tumour, can be used to determine a personalized approach to cancer treatment.

=== Cancer-driven DNA alterations ===
Cancer-driven DNA alterations can include somatic DNA mutations and inherited DNA variants. They are not a direct focus of pharmacogenomic studies, but they can have an impact on pharmacogenomic strategies. These alterations can affect the pharmacokinetics and pharmacodynamics of metabolic pathways, making them potentially actionable drug-targets.

As whole-genome technologies continue to advance, there will be increased opportunities to discover mutations and variants that are involved in tumour progression, response to therapy, and drug-metabolism.

=== Polymorphism search ===
Candidate polymorphism search refers to finding polymorphic DNA sequences within specific genes that are candidates for certain traits. Within pharmacogenomics, this method tries to resolve pharmacokinetic or pharmacodynamic traits of a compound to a candidate polymorphism level. This type of information can contribute to selecting effective therapeutic strategies for a patient.

To understand the potential functional impact of a polymorphic DNA sequence, gene silencing can be used. Previously, siRNAs have been commonly used to suppress gene expressions, but more recently, siRNA have been suggested for use in studying and developing therapeutics.

Another new method being applied is Clustered Regularly Interspaced Short Palindromic Repeats (CRISPR). CRISPR, combined with the Cas9 enzyme, form the basis for the technology known as CRISPR-Cas9. This system can recognize and cleave specific DNA sequences, and thus is a powerful system for gene silencing purposes.

=== Pathway search ===
An extension on the previous strategies is candidate pathway search. This type of analysis considers a group of related genes, whose altered function may have an effect on therapy, rather than solely focusing on one gene. It can provide insight into additional information such as gene-gene interactions, epistatic effects, or influences from cis-regulatory elements. These all contribute to understanding variations in drug efficacy and toxicity between patients.

=== Whole-Genome Strategies ===
Advancements in the cost and throughput of sequencing technologies is making it possible to perform whole-genome sequencing at higher rates. The ability to perform whole-genome analysis for cancer patients can aid in identifying markers of predisposition to drug toxicity and efficacy. Strategies for pharmacogenomic discovery using whole-genome sequences include targeting frequently mutated gene stretches (known as hotspots) to identify markers of prognostic and diagnostic significance, or targeting specific genes that are known to be associated with a particular disease.

== Gene target examples ==
=== HER2 ===
HER2 is an established therapeutic target within breast cancer, and the activation of HER2 is observed in approximately 20% of breast cancers as a result of overexpression. Trastuzumab, the first HER2-targeted drug developed in 1990, interferes with HER2 signalling. In 2001, a study showed that adding trastuzumab to chemotherapy improved overall survival in women with HER2-positive metastatic breast cancer. Then, in 2005, it was shown that trastuzumab is effective as an adjuvant treatment in women with early-stage breast cancer. Thus, trastuzumab has been a standard-of-care treatment in both metastatic and early stage HER2-positive breast cancer cases. Many genome sequencing studies have also revealed that other cancer tumours had HER2 alterations, including overexpression, amplifications and other mutations. Because of this, there has been a lot of interest in studying the efficacy of HER2-targeted therapies within a range of cancer types, including bladder, colorectal, and gastro-esophageal.

=== BCR-ABL ===
The majority of chronic myelogenous leukemia cases are caused by a rearrangement between chromosomes 9 and 22. This results in the fusion of the genes BCR and ABL. This atypical gene fusion encodes for unregulated tyrosine kinase activity, which results in the rapid and continuous division of white blood cells. Drugs known as tyrosine kinase inhibitors target BCR-ABL, and are the standard treatment for chronic myelogenous leukemia. Imatinib was the first tyrosine kinase inhibitor discovered with high specificity for targeting BCR-ABL. However, after imatinib was used as the first-line therapy, several BCR-ABL-dependent and BCR-ABL-independent mechanisms of resistance developed. Thus, new second-line and third-line drugs have also been developed to address new, mutated forms of BCR-ABL. These include dasatinib, nilotinib, bosutinib, and ponatinib.

== Pharmacokinetic genes ==
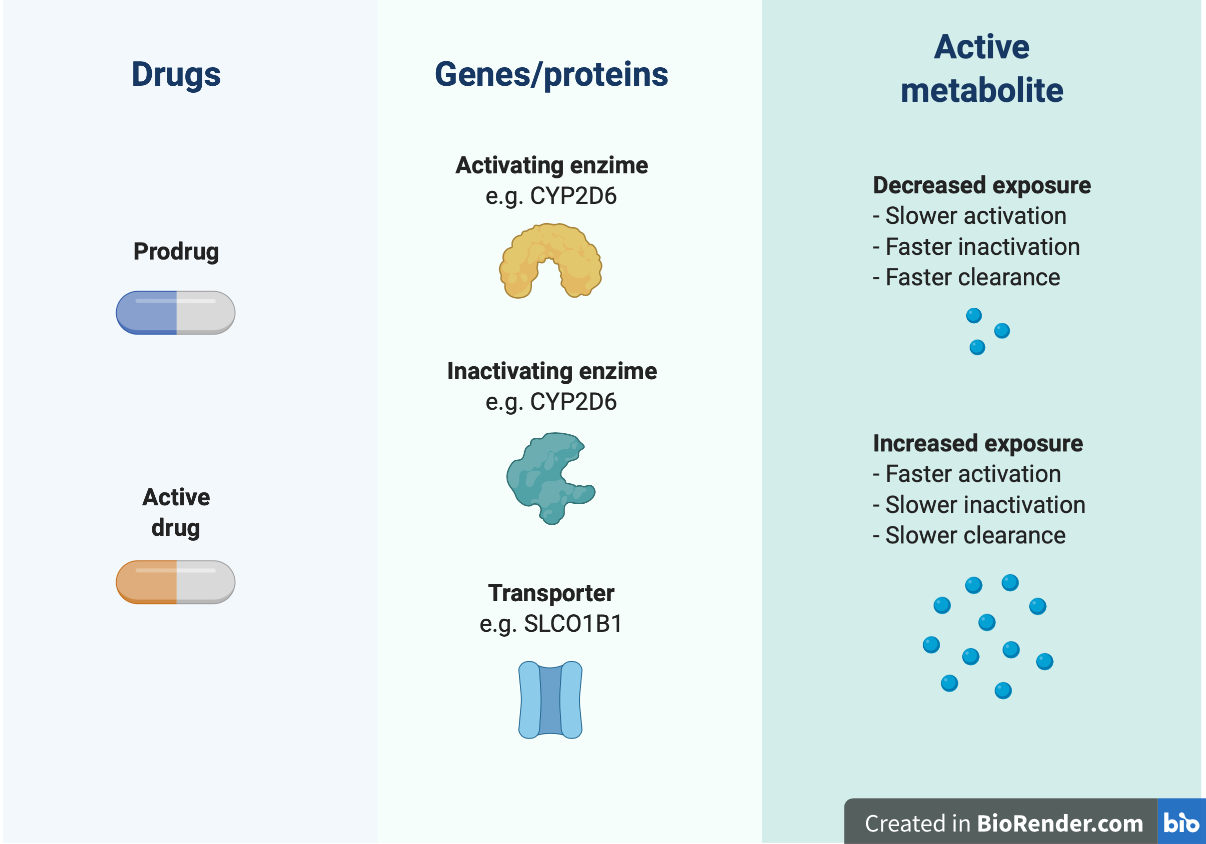
Components of the pharmacodynamic influence of genes on drug exposure.

Cancer pharmacogenomics has also contributed to the understanding of how pharmacokinetic genes affect the exposure to cancer drugs, which can help predict patient sensitivity to treatment toxicity. Some of these findings have been successfully translated into clinical practice in the form of professional guidelines from the Clinical Pharmacogenomics Implementation Consortium (CPIC) or other institutions.

=== TPMT ===
The TPMT gene encodes for the thiopurine S-methyltransferase (TPMT) enzyme. It participates in the S-methylation of thiopurine drugs, which include 6-mercaptopurine, 6-thioguanine, and Azathioprine. The first two drugs are indicated for leukemias and lymphomas, while Azathioprine is used in nonmalignant conditions such as Crohn's disease. These purine antimetabolites are activated in the form of thioguanine nucleotides that affect DNA replication when incorporated into DNA. This activation occurs through hypoxanthine phosphoribosyltransferase to 6-thioguanosines (6-TGN), and the resulting antimetabolites are inactivated by TPMT. It has been established that the TPMT genotype of a patient can affect the levels of exposure to the active metabolites, which has an impact in the treatment toxicity and efficacy. Specifically, TPMT-deficient patients, such as those homozygous for the *2 and *3 alleles, can experience myelosuppression up to pancytopenia. In a study on 1214 European Caucasian individuals, a trimodal distribution of TPMT genotypes was found, with 89.5% normal-to-high methylators, 9.9% intermediates, and 0.6% deficient methylators CPIC guidelines recommend a dose reduction of 5-10% of the standard dose and a lower frequency of application in individuals that are TPMT poor metabolizers.

=== DPD ===
The dihydropyrimidine dehydrogenase (DPD) protein is responsible for the inactivation of more than 80% of the anticancer drug 5-Fluorouracil (5-FU) in the liver. This drug is commonly used in colorectal cancer treatment, and increased exposure to it can cause myelosuppression, mucositis, neurotoxicity, hand-foot syndrome, and diarrhea. The genotype of DPYD (the gene that codes for DPD) has been linked to severe 5-FU toxicities in several studies summarized in meta-analyses. The CPIC has provided guidelines for implementation of DPYD pharmacogenetics, indicating that homozygote carriers of low-activity variants should be prescribed an alternative drug, while heterozygotes should receive half of the normal dose.

=== UGT1A1 ===
The UDP glucuronosyltransferase 1A1 (UGT1A1) is an hepatic enzyme involved in the glucoronidation of exogenous and endogenous substrates, such as bilirubin. There have been over 100 variants identified in UGT1A1 and some mutations are implicated Gilbert syndrome and Cringler-Najjar syndrome. Two variants in particular, UGT1A1*28 and UGT1A1*6, are associated with the pharmacogenomics of irinotecan chemotherapy. A UGT1A1*28 allele means the presence of 7 TA repeats in the promoter sequence of the gene, instead of the normal 6 repeats. The allele UGT1A1*6 is characterized by a SNP in exon 1.

Irinotecan is a prodrug used in the treatment of many solid tumours, including colorectal, pancreatic, and lung cancer. Irinotecan is metabolized into its active compound SN-38, which inhibits the enzyme topoisomerase-1, involved in DNA replication. This active metabolite is inactivated after glucoronidation, mainly performed by UGT1A1. High exposure to SN-38 can result in neutropenia and gastrointestinal toxicity. The decreased activity of UGT1A1 in UGT1A1*28 individuals has been found to increase exposure to the active compound and toxicity. For UGT1A1*6, this relationship is more controversial, with some studies finding it can predict irinotecan toxicity while others don't. Previous prospective studies for assessing the adequate dose of irinotecan in Asians have supported the usage of lower doses in patients with both of UGT1A1*28 and UGT1A1*6. The results from these and other pharmacogenomics studies have been translated into clinical guidelines from organizations in USA, Canada, France, The Netherlands, and Europe. All of these institutions recommend a dose reduction in UGT1A1*28 patients.

== Challenges ==
One of the biggest challenges in using pharmacogenomics to study cancer is the difficulty in conducting studies in humans. Drugs used for chemotherapy are too toxic to give to healthy individuals, which makes it difficult to perform genetic studies between related individuals. Furthermore, some mutations occur at high frequencies, whereas others occur at very low frequencies, so there is often a need to screen a large number of patients in order to identify those with a particular genetic marker. And, although genomic-driven analyses is effective for stratifying patients and identifying possible treatment options, it is often difficult for laboratories to get reimbursed for these genomic sequencing tests. Thus, tracking clinical outcomes for patients whom undergo sequencing is key to demonstrating both the clinical utility and cost-effectiveness of pharmacogenomics within cancer.

Another challenge is that cancer patients are often treated with different combinations and dosages of drugs, so finding a large sample of patients that have been treated the same way is rare. So, studying the pharmacogenomics of a specific drug of interest is difficult, and, because additional identical trials may not be feasible, it can be difficult to replicate discoveries.

Furthermore, studies have shown that drug efficacy and toxicity are likely multigenic traits. Since pathways contain multiple genes, various combinations of driver mutations could promote tumour progression. This can make it difficult to distinguish between functional driver mutations versus random, nonfunctional mutations.

== Future ==
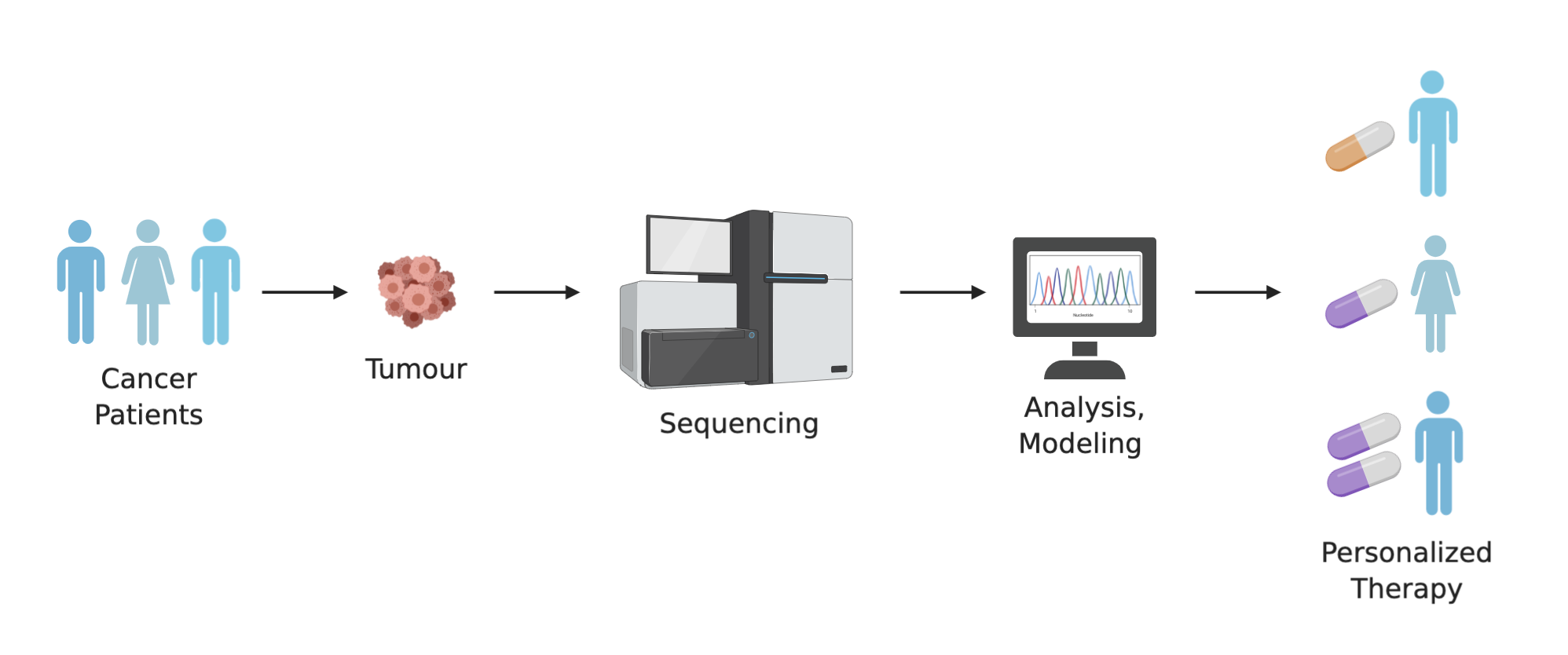

With new tools and technologies continuing to develop, there are growing opportunities to analyze cancer at the single-cell level. Corresponding approaches with whole-genome sequencing can also be applied to single-cell sequences and analyses. This level of pharmacogenomics has implications in personalized medicine, as single-cell RNA sequencing and genotyping can characterize subclones of the same tumour, and lead to the identification therapy-resistant cells, as well as their corresponding pathways.
