= Purine analogue =

Class of antymetabolites for cytostatic chemotherapy

Purine analogues are antimetabolites that mimic the structure of metabolic purines.

== Examples ==
- Nucleobase analogues
  - Thiopurines such as thioguanine are used to treat acute leukemias and remissions in acute granulocytic leukemias.
    - Azathioprine is the main immunosuppressive cytotoxic substance. A prodrug, it is widely used in transplantation to control rejection reactions. It is nonenzymatically cleaved to mercaptopurine, a purine analogue that inhibits DNA synthesis. By preventing the clonal expansion of lymphocytes in the induction phase of the immune response, it affects both cell immunity and humoral immunity. It also successfully suppresses autoimmunity.
    - Mercaptopurine
    - Thioguanine
- Nucleoside analogues
  - Clofarabine
  - Pentostatin and cladribine are adenosine analogs that are used primarily to treat hairy cell leukemia.
- Nucleotide analogues
  - Fludarabine inhibits multiple DNA polymerases, DNA primase, and DNA ligase I, and is S phase-specific (since these enzymes are highly active during DNA replication).
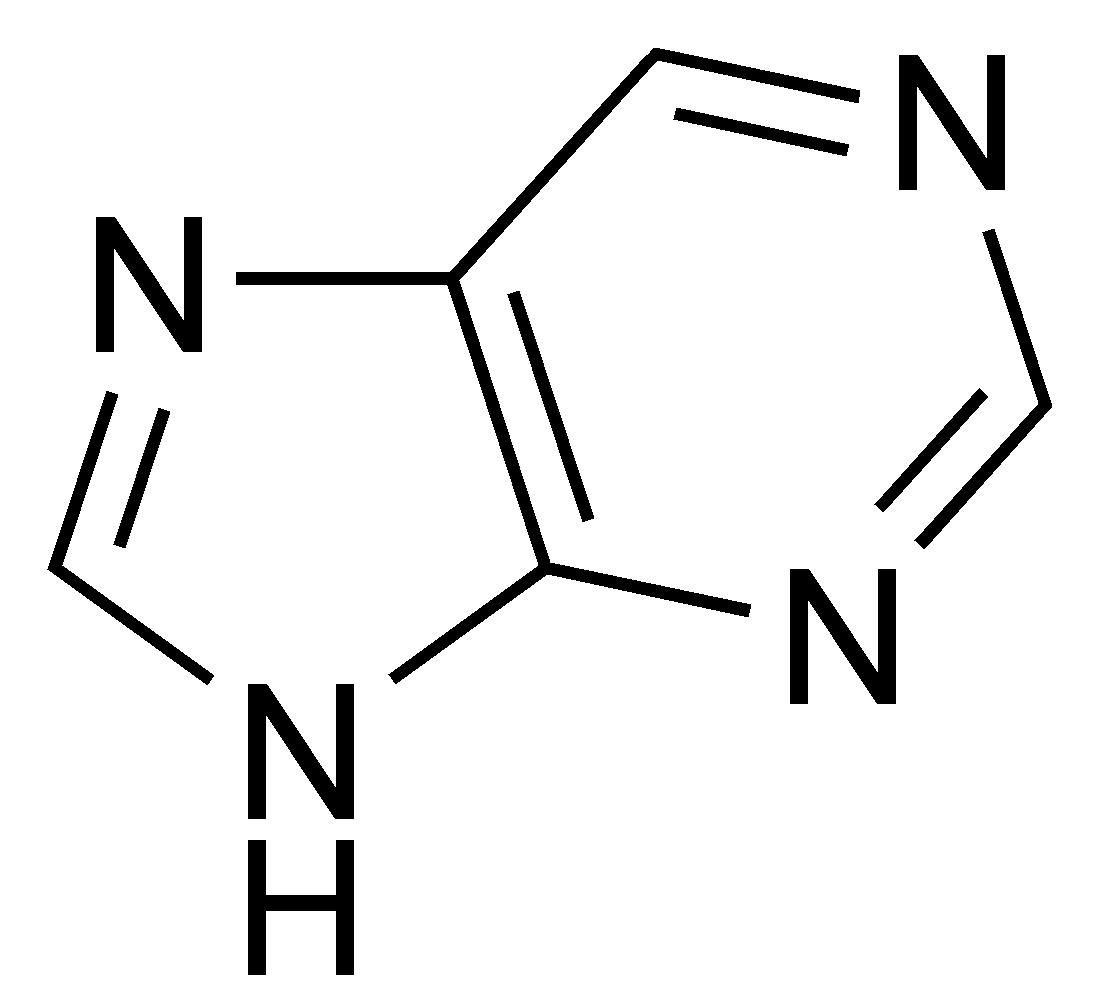
Purine

Mercaptopurine

Thioguanine

Fludarabine

== Medical uses ==
Purine antimetabolites are commonly used to treat cancer by interfering with DNA replication.
