= Azathioprine =

Immunosuppressive medication

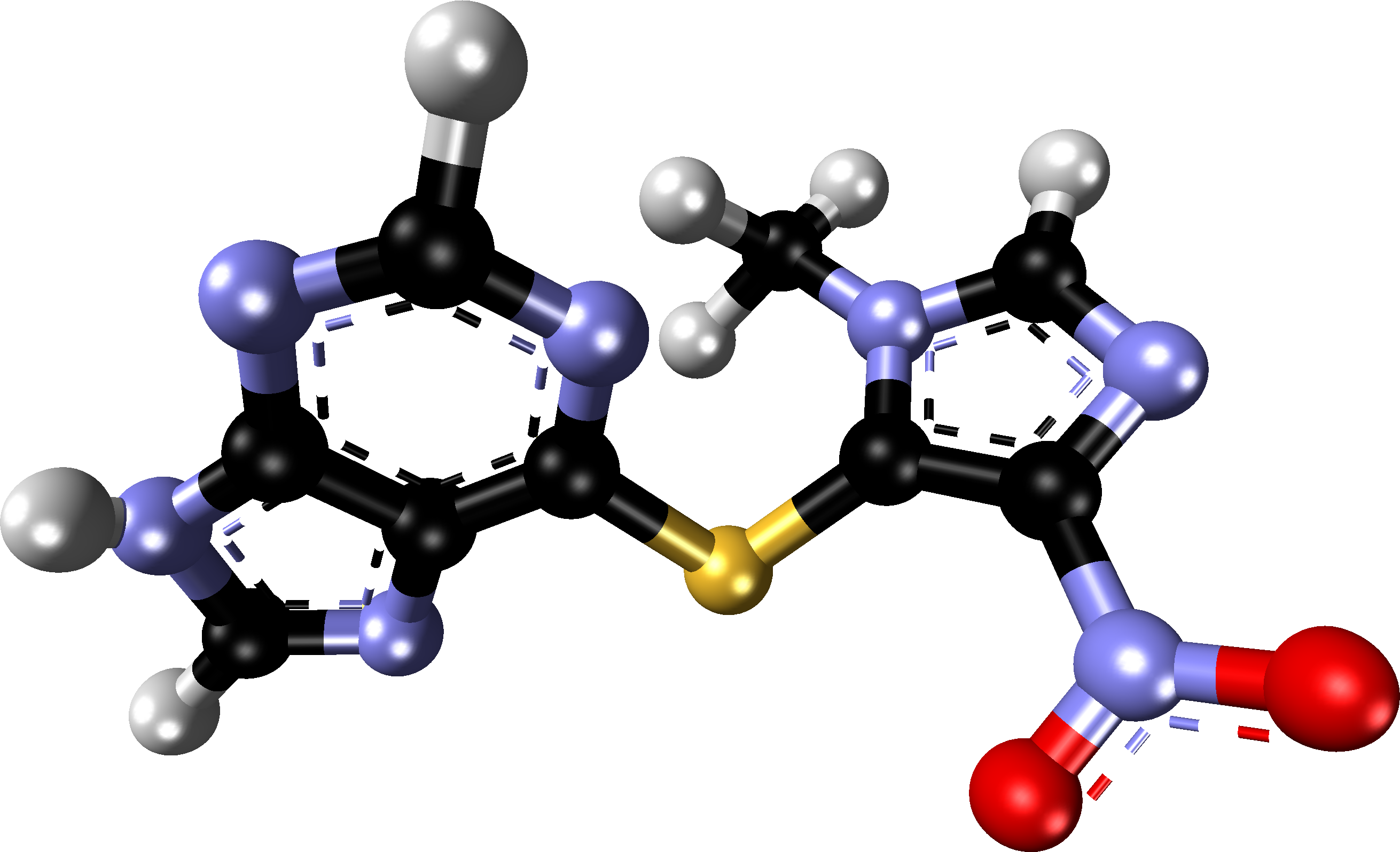

Clinical data
- Pronunciation: /ˌæzəˈθaɪəˌpriːn/
- Trade names: Azasan, Imuran, Jayempi, others
- Other names: AZA
- AHFS/Drugs.com: Monograph
- MedlinePlus: a682167
- License data: US DailyMed: Azathioprine
- Pregnancy category: AU: D
- Routes of administration: By mouth, intravenous
- ATC code: L04AX01 (WHO)

Legal status
- Legal status: AU: S4 (Prescription only); CA: ℞-only; UK: POM (Prescription only); US: ℞-only; EU: Rx-only

Pharmacokinetic data
- Bioavailability: 60±31%
- Protein binding: 20–30%
- Metabolism: Activated non-enzymatically, deactivated mainly by xanthine oxidase
- Elimination half-life: 26–80 minutes (azathioprine); 3–5 hours (drug plus metabolites)
- Excretion: Kidney, 98% as metabolites

Identifiers
- IUPAC name: 6-[(1-Methyl-4-nitro-1H-imidazol-5-yl)sulfanyl]-7H-purine
- CAS Number: 446-86-6 55774-33-9 (sodium salt)
- PubChem CID: 2265
- DrugBank: DB00993
- ChemSpider: 2178
- UNII: MRK240IY2L
- KEGG: D00238
- ChEBI: CHEBI:2948
- ChEMBL: ChEMBL1542
- CompTox Dashboard (EPA): DTXSID4020119
- ECHA InfoCard: 100.006.525

Chemical and physical data
- Formula: C_{9}H_{7}N_{7}O_{2}S
- Molar mass: 277.26 g·mol^{−1}
- 3D model (JSmol): Interactive image
- Melting point: 238 to 245 °C (460 to 473 °F)
- SMILES: Cn1cnc(N(=O)=O)c1Sc2ncnc3nc[nH]c23
- InChI: InChI=1S/C9H7N7O2S/c1-15-4-14-7(16(17)18)9(15)19-8-5-6(11-2-10-5)12-3-13-8/h2-4H,1H3,(H,10,11,12,13); Key:LMEKQMALGUDUQG-UHFFFAOYSA-N

Azathioprine, sold under the brand name Imuran, among others, is an immunosuppressive medication. It is used for the treatment of rheumatoid arthritis, granulomatosis with polyangiitis, Crohn's disease, ulcerative colitis, and systemic lupus erythematosus, and in kidney transplants to prevent rejection. It is listed by the International Agency for Research on Cancer as a group 1 human carcinogen. It is taken by mouth or injected into a vein.

Common side effects include bone-marrow suppression and vomiting. Bone-marrow suppression is especially common in people with a genetic deficiency of the enzyme thiopurine S-methyltransferase. Other serious risk factors include an increased risk of certain cancers. Use during pregnancy may result in harm to the baby. Azathioprine belongs to the purine analogues subclass of antimetabolites family of medications. It works via 6-thioguanine to disrupt the making of RNA and DNA by cells.

Azathioprine was first made in 1957. It is on the World Health Organization's List of Essential Medicines. In 2018, it was the 358th most commonly prescribed medication in the United States, with more than 800,000 prescriptions.

== Medical uses ==
Azathioprine is used alone or in combination with other immunosuppressive therapy to prevent rejection following organ transplantation, and to treat an array of autoimmune diseases, including rheumatoid arthritis, pemphigus, systemic lupus erythematosus, Behçet's disease, and other forms of vasculitis, autoimmune hepatitis, atopic dermatitis, myasthenia gravis, neuromyelitis optica (Devic's disease), restrictive lung disease, and others. It is also an important therapy and steroid-sparing agent for inflammatory bowel disease (such as Crohn's disease and ulcerative colitis) and for multiple sclerosis.

In the United States, it is approved by the Food and Drug Administration for use in kidney transplantation from human donors, and for rheumatoid arthritis.

=== Transplantation ===
Azathioprine is used to prevent rejections of kidney or liver allografts, usually in conjunction with other therapies, including corticosteroids, other immunosuppressants, and local radiation therapy. The administration protocol starts either at the time of transplantation or within the following two days.

=== Rheumatoid arthritis ===
Being a disease-modifying antirheumatic drug (DMARD), azathioprine has been used for the management of the signs and symptoms of adult rheumatoid arthritis. Nonsteroidal anti-inflammatory drugs and corticosteroids may be combined or continued (if they were already in use) with azathioprine, but the combination with other DMARDs is not recommended.

=== Inflammatory bowel disease ===
Azathioprine has been used in the management of moderate to severe chronically active Crohn's disease, to maintain clinical remission (absence of disease activity) in corticosteroid-dependent patients, and to provide benefit in people with fistulizing Crohn's disease. The onset of action is slow, and several months may be required to achieve a clinical response.

Azathioprine treatment is associated with an increased risk of lymphoma, but whether this is due to the drug or a predisposition related to Crohn's disease is unclear. Lower doses of azathioprine are used as a therapy in children with refractory or corticosteroid-dependent Crohn's disease, without causing many side effects. It may also be used to prevent flares in those with ulcerative colitis.

=== Others ===
Azathioprine is sometimes used in systemic lupus erythematosus, requiring a maintenance dose of 15 mg or higher of prednisone in those who experience recurrent flares.

It is used as an add-on therapy when steroid therapy is given by mouth for pemphigus and myasthenia gravis, as a "steroid-sparing" agent. Azathioprine is also used to maintain remission in people who have granulomatosis with polyangiitis.

It can be very effective in eczema and atopic dermatitis, though it is not commonly used. The British National Eczema Society lists it as a third-line treatment for severe to moderate cases of these skin diseases.

It was widely used to treat multiple sclerosis until the first half of the 1990s. Concerns about increased risk of malignancy have led to a decreased use, yet it is still used in maintenance treatment for people who frequently relapse. A 2007 Cochrane review found that azathioprine reduced the number of relapses in the first year of treatment and disease progression in the first two to three years and did not find an increase in cancer, and noted the need for direct comparison of azathioprine and interferon beta, conflicting conclusions regarding cancer, and the potential for long-term risks.

A widely used therapy for idiopathic pulmonary fibrosis was azathioprine in combination with prednisone and N-acetylcysteine. A 2012 study showed that this combination produced worse outcomes than a placebo.

== Adverse effects ==
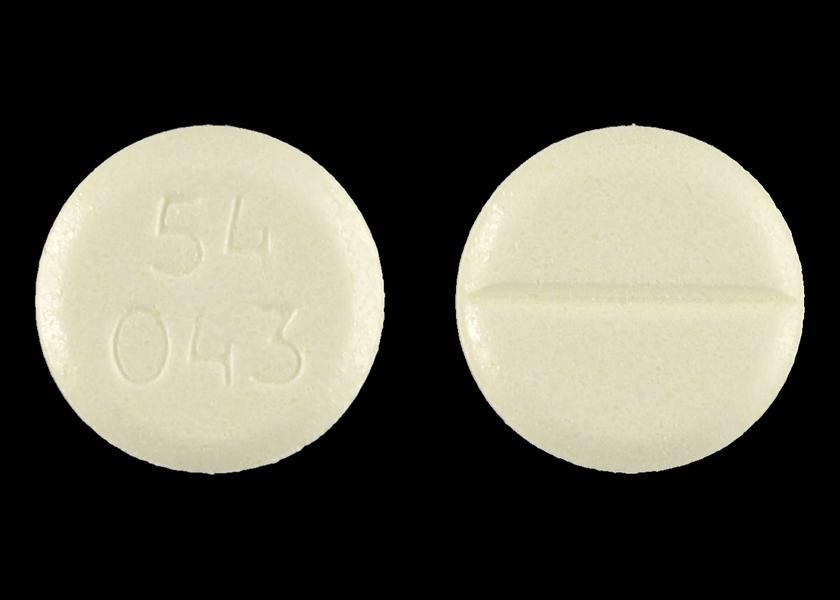
Two generic azathioprine oral tablets, 50 mg each

Nausea and vomiting are common adverse effects, especially at the beginning of treatment. Such cases are met with taking azathioprine after meals or transient intravenous administration. Side effects that are probably hypersensitivity reactions include dizziness, diarrhea, fatigue, and rashes. Hair loss is often seen in transplant patients receiving the drug but rarely occurs under other indications. Because azathioprine suppresses the bone marrow, patients can develop anaemia and be more susceptible to infection; regular monitoring of the blood count is recommended during treatment. Acute pancreatitis can also occur, especially in patients with Crohn's disease. Treatment is discontinued in up to 30% of patients due these effects, but therapeutic drug monitoring of the biologically active metabolites, i.e. thiopurine nucleotides, can help to optimize the efficacy and safety. Clinically, most hospitals resort to ion-exchange LC-MS (liquid chromotography – mass spectrometry), but the newly developed approach of porous graphitic carbon-based chromatography hyphenated with mass spectrometry appears superior with respect to patient care in this respect.

It is listed by the International Agency for Research on Cancer as a group 1 carcinogen (carcinogenic to humans).

=== Pharmacogenetics ===
The enzyme thiopurine S-methyltransferase (TPMT) is responsible for various activation and deactivation steps in azathioprine's mechanism of action. The first metabolic step that azathioprine undergoes in the body is the conversion to 6-mercaptopurine (6-MP; see Pharmacokinetics), which is itself an immunosuppressant prodrug. The TPMT enzyme is responsible, in part, for the methylation of 6-MP into the inactive metabolite 6-methylmercaptopurine – this methylation prevents 6-MP from further conversion into active, cytotoxic thioguanine nucleotide (TGN) metabolites. Certain genetic variations within the TPMT gene can lead to decreased or absent TPMT enzyme activity, and individuals who are homozygous or heterozygous for these types of genetic variations may have increased levels of TGN metabolites and an increased risk of severe bone-marrow suppression (myelosuppression) when receiving azathioprine. In many ethnicities, TPMT polymorphisms that result in decreased or absent TPMT activity occur with a frequency of approximately 5%, meaning that about 0.25% of patients are homozygous for these variants. However, an assay of TPMT activity in red blood cells or a TPMT genetic test can identify patients with reduced TPMT enzyme activity, allowing for the adjustment of azathioprine dose or avoidance of the drug entirely. The FDA-approved drug label for azathioprine recommends testing for TPMT activity to identify patients at risk for myelotoxicity. Indeed, testing for TPMT activity is one of the few examples of pharmacogenetics being translated into routine clinical care. Missense SNP in NUDT15 (e.g., rs116855232, inducing R139C)) has been identified to be a causal factor for AZA-induced leukopenia through a genome-wide association study (GWAS) in East Asians.

=== Cancers ===
Azathioprine is listed as a human carcinogen in the 12th Report on Carcinogens by the National Toxicology Program of U.S. Department of Health and Human Services, asserting that it is "known to be a human carcinogen based on sufficient evidence of carcinogenicity from studies in humans." Since August 2009, the U.S. FDA has required warnings to be placed on packaging with respect to increased risks of certain cancers.

The risks involved seem to be related both to the duration and the dosage used. People who have previously been treated with an alkylating agent may have an excessive risk of cancers if treated with azathioprine. Epidemiological studies by International Agency for Research on Cancer have provided "sufficient" evidence of azathioprine carcinogenicity in humans (group 1), although the methodology of past studies and the possible underlying mechanisms are questioned.

The various diseases requiring transplantation may in themselves increase the risks of non-Hodgkin lymphoma, squamous cell carcinomas of the skin, hepatobiliary carcinomas, and mesenchymal tumours to which azathioprine may add additional risks. Those receiving azathioprine for rheumatoid arthritis may have a lower risk than those undergoing transplantation.

Cases of hepatosplenic T-cell lymphoma – a rare type of lymphoma – have been reported in patients treated with azathioprine. The majority occurred in patients with inflammatory bowel disease. Adolescents and young adult males were the majority of cases. They presented with a very aggressive disease course, and with one exception, died of the lymphoma. The FDA has required changes to the labeling to inform users and clinicians of the issue.

==== Skin cancers ====
In transplant patients, skin cancer is 50 to 250 times more common than in the general population, and between 60 and 90% of patients are affected 20 years after transplantation. The use of immunosuppressive medication including azathioprine in organ transplantation has been linked to increased rates of developing skin cancer. Azathioprine causes the accumulation of 6-thioguanine (6-TG) in patients' DNA, which might trigger cancer when the patient is later exposed to ultraviolet light. Patients taking azathioprine were found to be abnormally sensitive to UVA light.

== Overdose ==
Large, single doses are generally well tolerated; a patient who took 7.5 g azathioprine (150 tablets) at once showed no relevant symptoms apart from vomiting, slightly decreased white blood cell count, and marginal changes in liver function parameters. The main symptoms of long-term overdosing are infections of unclear origin, mouth ulcers, and spontaneous bleeding, all of which are consequences of its bone-marrow suppression.

== Interactions ==
Other purine analogues, such as allopurinol, inhibit xanthine oxidase, the enzyme that breaks down azathioprine, thus increasing the toxicity of azathioprine. Low doses of allopurinol, though, have been shown to safely enhance the efficacy of azathioprine, especially in inflammatory bowel disease nonresponders. This may still lead to lower lymphocyte counts and higher rates of infection, so the combination requires careful monitoring.

Azathioprine decreases the effects of the anticoagulant warfarin and of nondepolarizing muscle relaxants, but increases the effect of depolarizing muscle relaxants. It can also interfere with niacin (vitamin B_{3}), resulting in at least one case to pellagra and fatal medullary aplasia.

== Pregnancy and breastfeeding ==
Azathioprine can cause birth defects. A 2003 population-based study in Denmark showed that the use of azathioprine and related mercaptopurine resulted in a seven-fold incidence of fetal abnormalities, as well as a 20-fold increase in miscarriage. Birth defects in a child whose father was taking azathioprine have also been reported. Although no adequate and well-controlled studies have taken place in humans, when given to animals in doses equivalent to human dosages, teratogenesis was observed. Transplant patients already on this drug should not discontinue on becoming pregnant. This contrasts with the later-developed drugs tacrolimus and mycophenolate, which are contraindicated during pregnancy.

Traditionally, as for all cytotoxic drugs, the manufacturer advises not to breastfeed whilst taking azathioprine, but the "lactation risk category" reported by Thomas Hale in his book Medications and Mothers' Milk lists azathioprine as "L3", termed "moderately safe".

== Pharmacology ==
=== Pharmacokinetics ===
Metabolic pathway for azathioprine (AZA). Active metabolites are highlighted.: XO: xanthine oxidase; 6-MP: 6-mercaptopurine; TPMT: thiopurine methyltransferase; 6-MMP: 6-methylmercaptopurine; HPRT: hypoxanthine-guanine phosphoribosyltransferase; TIMP: thioinosine monophosphate, thioinosinic acid; MeTIMP: methyl-thioinosine monophosphate; TGTP: thioguanosine triphosphate; TdGTP: thio-deoxyguanosine triphosphate

Azathioprine is absorbed from the gut to about 88%. Bioavailability varies greatly between individual patients, between 30 and 90%, because the drug is partly inactivated in the liver. Highest blood plasma concentrations, counting not only the drug itself, but also its metabolites, are reached after 1–2 hours, and the average plasma half-life is 26 to 80 minutes for azathioprine and 3–5 hours for drug plus metabolites; 20 to 30% are bound to plasma proteins while circulating in the bloodstream.

Azathioprine is a prodrug, a substance that is not an active drug itself but is activated in the body. This happens in several steps; at first, it is slowly and almost completely converted to 6-mercaptopurine (6-MP) by reductive cleavage of the thioether (–S–). This is mediated by glutathione and similar compounds in the intestinal wall, the liver, and on red blood cells, without the aid of enzymes. 6-MP is metabolized analogously to natural purines, giving thioguanosine triphosphate (TGTP) and thiodeoxyguanosine triphosphate (TdGTP) via thioinosine monophosphate (TIMP) and several further intermediates. On a second path, the sulfur atom of 6-MP and TIMP is methylated. The end products of azathioprine metabolism are thiouric acid (38%) and various methylated and hydroxylated purines, which are excreted via the urine.

=== Mechanism of action ===
Azathioprine inhibits purine synthesis. Purines are needed to produce DNA and RNA. By inhibiting purine synthesis, less DNA and RNA are produced for the synthesis of white blood cells, thus causing immunosuppression.

Azathioprine is converted within tissues to 6-MP, some of which is converted, in turn, to 6-thioguanine by the addition of an amino group. Both 6-MP and 6-thioguanine are conjugated with ribose and then phosphorylated to form the nucleotides thioinosinic acid and thioguanylic acid, respectively. These nucleotides masquerade, respectively, as inosinic acid and guanylic acid; the former is the starting point for purine nucleotide biosynthesis, while the latter is one of the building blocks of DNA and RNA.

- The nucleotides are incorporated into newly synthesized (but nonfunctional) DNA, halting replication.
- The nucleotides act to inhibit glutamine-phosphoribosyl pyrophosphate amidotransferase (GPAT), one of the enzymes involved in purine biosynthesis, one of the earlier steps in the synthesis of DNA and RNA. They achieve GPAT inhibition through a form of negative feedback called product inhibition. Because actively replicating cells (such as cancer cells and the T cells and B cells of the immune system) are most active in synthesizing purine, making new DNA, these cells are most strongly affected.
- A portion of the nucleotides is additionally phosphorylated to the triphosphate forms. These bind to GTP-binding protein Rac1, blocking synthesis of the protein Bcl-xL, thus sending activated T cells and mononuclear cells into apoptosis (programmed cell death). Increased apoptosis of mononuclear cells is seen in inflammatory bowel disease patients treated with azathioprine.

== Chemistry ==
Azathioprine is a thiopurine linked to a second heterocycle (an imidazole derivative) via a thioether. It is a pale yellow solid with a slightly bitter taste and a melting point of 238–245 °C. It is practically insoluble in water and only slightly soluble in lipophilic solvents such as chloroform, ethanol, and diethyl ether. It dissolves in alkaline aqueous solutions, where it hydrolyzes to 6-MP.

Azathioprine is synthesized from 5-chloro-1-methyl-4-nitro-1H-imidazole and 6-mercaptopurine in dimethyl sulfoxide. The synthesis of the former starts with an amide from methylamine and diethyl oxalate, which is then cyclized and chlorinated with phosphorus pentachloride; the nitro group is introduced with nitric and sulfuric acid.

== History ==
Azathioprine was synthesized by George Herbert Hitchings and Gertrude Elion in 1957 (named BW 57-322) to produce 6-MP in a metabolically active, but masked form, and at first used as a chemotherapy drug.

Robert Schwartz investigated the effect of 6-MP on the immune response in 1958 and discovered that it profoundly suppresses the formation of antibodies when given to rabbits together with antigens. Following the work done by Sir Peter Medawar and Gertrude Elion in discovering the immunological basis of rejection of transplanted tissues and organs, and Schwartz's researches on 6-MP, Sir Roy Calne, the British pioneer in transplantation, introduced 6-MP as an experimental immunosuppressant for kidney and heart transplants. When Calne asked Elion for related compounds to investigate, she suggested azathioprine, which was subsequently found out to be superior (as effective and less toxic to the bone marrow) by Calne.

In April 1962, with regimens consisting of azathioprine and prednisone, the transplantation of kidneys to unrelated recipients (allotransplantation) was successful for the first time. For many years, this kind of dual therapy with azathioprine and glucocorticoids was the standard antirejection regimen, until cyclosporin was introduced into clinical practice (by Calne as well) in 1978.

Cyclosporin has now replaced some of the azathioprine use due to a longer survival time, especially in heart-related transplantations. Moreover, despite being considerably more expensive, mycophenolate mofetil is also increasingly being used in place of azathioprine in organ transplantation, as it is associated with less bone-marrow suppression, fewer opportunistic infections, and a lower incidence of acute rejection.
