= Timp (disambiguation) =

Timp (short for Mount Timpanogos) is the second highest mountain in Utah's Wasatch Range.

Timp or TIMP may refer to:

- Timp, a colloquial word for timpani
- Tissue inhibitor of metalloproteinases, a family of proteins that act as enzyme inhibitors
- Thioinosine monophosphate, an intermediate metabolite of azathioprine
- Coby Timp (1930–2025), Dutch actress

== See also ==
- Temp (disambiguation)
