= George H. Hitchings =

Nobel Prize-winning American doctor (1905–1998)

George Hitchings
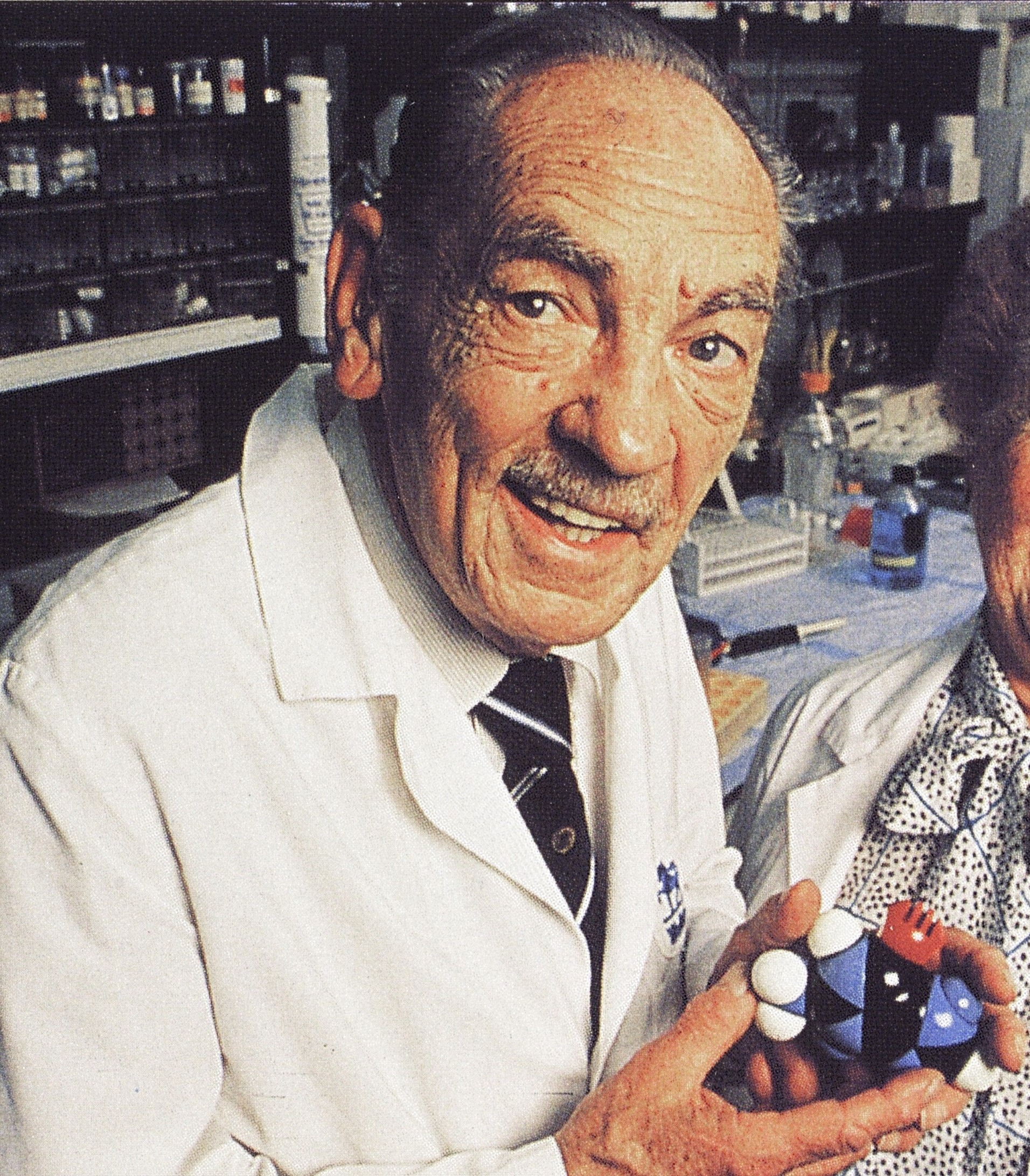
- George H. Hitchings in 1988
- Born: George Herbert Hitchings; April 18, 1905; Hoquiam, Washington, U.S.
- Died: February 27, 1998 (aged 92); Chapel Hill, North Carolina, U.S.
- Education: University of Washington; Harvard University
- Known for: chemotherapy
- Awards: Gairdner Foundation International Award (1968); Cameron Prize for Therapeutics of the University of Edinburgh (1972); ForMemRS (1974); Nobel Prize in Physiology or Medicine (1988)
- Scientific career
- Workplaces: Case Western Reserve University; Duke University

George Herbert Hitchings (April 18, 1905 – February 27, 1998) was an American biochemist who shared the 1988 Nobel Prize in Physiology or Medicine with Sir James Black and Gertrude Elion "for their discoveries of important principles for drug treatment", Hitchings specifically for his work on chemotherapy.

== Early life and education ==
Hitchings was born in Hoquiam, Washington, in 1905, and grew up there, in Berkeley, California, San Diego, Bellingham, Washington, and Seattle. He graduated from Seattle's Franklin High School, where he was salutatorian, in 1923, and from there went to the University of Washington, from which he graduated with a degree in chemistry cum laude in 1927, after having been elected to Phi Beta Kappa as a junior the year before. That summer, he worked at the university's Puget Sound Biological Station at Friday Harbor on San Juan Island , and received a master's degree the next year for his thesis based on that work.

From the University of Washington, Hitchings went to Harvard University as a teaching fellow, ending up at Harvard Medical School. Before getting his Ph.D. in 1933, he joined Alpha Chi Sigma in 1929.

== Career and research ==
Following his PhD, he worked at Harvard and Case Western Reserve University. In 1942, he went to work for Wellcome Research Laboratories at Tuckahoe, where he began working with Gertrude Elion in 1944. Drugs Hitchings' team worked on included 2,6-diaminopurine (a compound to treat leukemia) and p-chlorophenoxy-2,4-diaminopyrimidine (a folic acid antagonist). According to his Nobel Prize autobiography,

The line of inquiry we had begun in the 1940s [also] yielded new drug therapies for malaria (pyrimethamine), leukemia (6-mercaptopurine and thioguanine), gout (allopurinol), organ transplantation (azathioprine) and bacterial infections (co-trimoxazole (trimethoprimA)). The new knowledge contributed by our studies pointed the way for investigations that led to major antiviral drugs for herpes infections (acyclovir) and AIDS (zidovudine).

In 1967 Hitchings became vice president in Charge of Research of Burroughs-Wellcome. He became Scientist Emeritus in 1976. He also served as adjunct professor of pharmacology and of experimental medicine from 1970 to 1985 at Duke University.

Hitchings founded the Triangle Community Foundation in 1983. Hitchings is a member of the Medicinal Chemistry Hall of Fame.

== Personal life ==
His first wife, Beverly Reimer Hitchings, died in 1985. Hitchings remarried in 1989 to Joyce Carolyn Shaver-Hitchings, MD. Dr. Shaver-Hitchings died in 2009.

Hitchings died on 27 February 1998 in Chapel Hill, North Carolina.

== Awards and honors ==
Hitchings was awarded the Passano award by the Passano Foundation in 1969, and the de Villiers award in 1970. In 1972, he was awarded the Cameron Prize for Therapeutics of the University of Edinburgh. He was elected a Foreign Member of the Royal Society (ForMemRS) in 1974. In 1989, Hitchings received the Golden Plate Award of the American Academy of Achievement.
