= C10H16N5O13P3 =

The molecular formula C_{10}H_{16}N_{5}O_{13}P_{3} (molar mass: 507.18 g/mol) may refer to:

- Adenosine triphosphate (ATP)
- Deoxyguanosine triphosphate (dGTP)
