= Thiouric acid =

Names
- IUPAC name 6-Thioxo-7,9-dihydro-1H-purine-2,8(3H,6H)-dione
- Other names 6-Thiouric acid

Identifiers
CAS Number	2002-60-0
3D model (JSmol)	Interactive image
ChEBI	CHEBI:80608
ChemSpider	2297400
KEGG	C16613
PubChem CID	3032417
UNII	7F23ZQP3EM
CompTox Dashboard (EPA)	DTXSID40173843
- InChI: InChI=1S/C5H4N4O2S/c10-4-6-1-2(7-4)8-5(11)9-3(1)12/h(H4,6,7,8,9,10,11,12) Key: SXHQUGJSTGOXMD-UHFFFAOYSA-N
- SMILES: c12c([nH]c(=O)[nH]1)[nH]c(=O)[nH]c2=S

Properties
Chemical formula	C_{5}H_{4}N_{4}O_{2}S
Molar mass	184.17 g·mol^{−1}
- Except where otherwise noted, data are given for materials in their standard state (at 25 °C [77 °F], 100 kPa). Infobox references

Thiouric acid, more accurately called 6-thiouric acid, is a main inactive metabolite of the immunosuppressive drugs azathioprine, mercaptopurine and tioguanine.
