= Naranjo algorithm =

Drug reaction questionnaire

The Naranjo algorithm, Naranjo Scale, or Naranjo Nomogram is a questionnaire designed by Naranjo et al. for determining the likelihood of whether an adverse drug reaction (ADR) is actually due to the drug rather than the result of other factors. Probability is assigned via a score termed definite, probable, possible or doubtful. Values obtained from this algorithm are often used in peer reviews to verify the validity of author's conclusions regarding ADRs.

It is often compared to the WHO-UMC system for standardized causality assessment for suspected ADRs.

Empirical approaches to identifying ADRs have fallen short because of the complexity of the set of variables involved in their detection. Computer decision programs have helped in this analysis. Electronic medical record systems can be programmed to fire alerts when a potential adverse drug event is about to occur or has already occurred.[3,4] Automated adverse drug event monitors can search for keywords or phrases throughout the patient's medical record to identify drug therapies, laboratory results, or problem lists that may indicate that a patient has already been treated for an ADR. This detection method uncovers significantly more adverse events, including medication errors, than relying only on empirical methods or incident reports.[1,2]

Empirical methods to assess the likelihood that an ADR has taken place have been lacking. More formal, logical analysis can help differentiate between events that are attributable to a drug from those associated with underlying diseases or other factors, underlying the complexity of detection.[5]

Several investigators, among them researchers at the FDA, have developed such logical evaluation methods, or algorithms, for evaluating the probability of an ADR.[2, 20-24] Almost all of these methods employ critical causation variables identified by Sir Austin Bradford Hill in 1965.[6] The most widely accepted of these instruments is the Naranjo algorithm[22] (Table). This method has been tested for internal validity with between-rater reliability testing, and its probability scale has consensual, content, and concurrent validity as well as ease of use in clinical settings and controlled studies.

== Questionnaire ==
1. Are there previous conclusive reports on this reaction?

Yes (+1) No (0) Do not know or not done (0)

2. Did the adverse events appear after the suspected drug was given?

Yes (+2) No (-1) Do not know or not done (0)

3. Did the adverse reaction improve when the drug was discontinued or a specific antagonist was given?

Yes (+1) No (0) Do not know or not done (0)

4. Did the adverse reaction appear when the drug was re administered?

Yes (+2) No (-1) Do not know or not done (0)

5. Are there alternative causes that could have caused the reaction?

Yes (-1) No (+2) Do not know or not done (0)

6. Did the reaction reappear when a placebo was given?

Yes (-1) No (+1) Do not know or not done (0)

7. Was the drug detected in any body fluid in toxic concentrations?

Yes (+1) No (0) Do not know or not done (0)

8. Was the reaction more severe when the dose was increased, or less severe when the dose was decreased?

Yes (+1) No (0) Do not know or not done (0)

9. Did the patient have a similar reaction to the same or similar drugs in any previous exposure?

Yes (+1) No (0) Do not know or not done (0)

10. Was the adverse event confirmed by any objective evidence?

Yes (+1) No (0) Do not know or not done (0)

Scoring

- ≥ 9 = definite ADR
- 5-8 = probable ADR
- 1-4 = possible ADR
- 0 = doubtful ADR
