= NUDT15 =

Identifiers
- Aliases: NUDT15, MTH2, NUDT15D, nudix hydrolase 15
- External IDs: OMIM: 615792; MGI: 2443366; GeneCards: NUDT15
Available structures
PDB	Ortholog search: PDBe RCSB
PDB	List of PDB id codes 5BON
Enzyme activity
EC #	BRENDA	ExPASy	KEGG	MetaCyc
3.6.1.9	↗	↗	↗	↗
3.6.1.68	↗	↗	↗	↗
3.6.1.76	↗	↗	↗	↗

Gene location (Human)
Chr.	Chromosome 13 (human)
Band	13q14.2	Start	48,037,726 bp
Band	13q14.2	End	48,047,221 bp

Gene location (Mouse)
Chr.	Chromosome 14 (mouse)
Band	14|14 D3	Start	73,756,317 bp
Band	14|14 D3	End	73,785,682 bp
RNA expression pattern
Bgee	Human / Mouse (ortholog); Top expressed in: gonad; endothelial cell; mucosa of transverse colon; oocyte; rectum; secondary oocyte; mucosa of sigmoid colon; palpebral conjunctiva; gingival epithelium; endometrium / Top expressed in: spermatocyte; muscle of thigh; morula; embryo; ventricular zone; embryo; tail of embryo; renal corpuscle; epiblast; neural tube; More reference expression data
BioGPS	n/a
Gene ontology
Molecular function	8-oxo-7,8-dihydroguanosine triphosphate pyrophosphatase activity; hydrolase activity; metal ion binding; 8-oxo-7,8-dihydrodeoxyguanosine triphosphate pyrophosphatase activity; nucleoside-diphosphatase activity; nucleotide diphosphatase activity; protein binding; NADH pyrophosphatase activity; nucleoside-triphosphate diphosphatase activity
Cellular component	cytosol
Biological process	nucleobase-containing small molecule catabolic process; dGTP catabolic process; mitotic cell cycle; purine nucleotide catabolic process; DNA protection; regulation of proteasomal protein catabolic process; nucleoside phosphate catabolic process; response to reactive oxygen species; purine deoxyribonucleoside triphosphate catabolic process
Sources:Amigo / QuickGO
Orthologs
Databases	NCBI: entry; OMA: entry
Species	Human	Mouse
Entrez	55270	214254
Ensembl	ENSG00000136159	ENSMUSG00000033405
UniProt	Q9NV35	Q8BG93
RefSeq (mRNA)	NM_018283; NM_001304745	NM_172527; NM_001360484
RefSeq (protein)	NP_001291674; NP_060753	NP_766115; NP_001347413
Location (UCSC)	Chr 13: 48.04 – 48.05 Mb	Chr 14: 73.76 – 73.79 Mb
PubMed search
- Wikidata
View/Edit Human	View/Edit Mouse

Nudix hydrolase 15 is a protein that in humans is encoded by the NUDT15 gene.

== Function ==
The NUDT15 gene encodes an enzyme that belongs to the Nudix hydrolase superfamily. Members of this superfamily catalyze the hydrolysis of nucleoside diphosphates, including substrates like 8-oxo-dGTP, which are a result of oxidative damage, and can induce base mispairing during DNA replication, causing transversions. The encoded enzyme is a negative regulator of thiopurine activation and toxicity. Mutations in this gene result in poor metabolism of thiopurines, and are associated with thiopurine-induced early leukopenia. Multiple pseudogenes of this gene have been identified.

NUDT15 germline variants (e.g., a missense SNP:rs116855232, inducing R139C) have been linked to clinical usage of thiopurines (e.g., mercaptopurine) in acute lymphoblastic leukemia as well as inflammatory bowel diseases to avoid thiopurine-induced leukopenia. These variants also exhibit ethnicity-specific (e.g., variant allele of rs116855232 is high is East Asians and Hispanics but low in Caucasians and Africans). Rare functional variants in this gene have also been identified as being related to thiopurine-induced myelotoxicity, suggesting the whole gene screening should be taken to determine the initial dosage using of thiopurine.
