= Product inhibition =

Enzyme inhibition

Product inhibition is a type of enzyme inhibition where the product of an enzyme reaction inhibits its production. Cells utilize product inhibition to regulate of metabolism as a form of negative feedback controlling metabolic pathways. Product inhibition is also an important topic in biotechnology, as overcoming this effect can increase the yield of a product, such as an antibiotic. Product inhibition can be competitive, non-competitive or uncompetitive.

== Mitigation of product inhibition ==
=== Reactor design ===
One method to reduce product inhibition is the use of a membrane reactor. These bioreactors uses a membrane to separate products from the rest of the reactor, limiting their inhibition. If the product differs greatly in size from the cells producing it, and the substrate feeding the cells, then the reactor can utilize a semipermeable membrane allowing to products to exit the reactor while leaving the cells and substrate behind to continue reacting making more product. Other reactor systems use chemical potential to separate products from the reactor, such as solubility of different compounds allowing one to pass through the membrane. Electrokinetic bioreactor systems have been developed which use electrolysis, a process that uses electrical charge to remove the product from the bioreactor system.

External loop reactor uses current created by air bubbles flowing through the reactor to create a flow that brings the reactor contents through an external loop. A separating membrane can be placed in the external loop to collect product, and reduce product inhibition. A downside to external loop reactors is they create additional shear stress. Submerged membrane bioreactors have the membrane contained within the main chamber of the bioreactor.

A separative bioreactor is a type of continuous reactor where the producing cells are mounted on a resin membrane as to not flow out of the reactor as substrate is passed over them. The continuous flow of the reactor takes the product downstream as it is produced.

=== Other methods of mitigating product inhibition ===
Integrated liquid-liquid extraction can be used to remove products that have a density that differs from the rest of the bioreactors contents. This is done by adding a solvent downstream of the bioreactor and letting the product separate out in a settling tank before the bioreactor effluent is moved to a secondary reactor or returned to its initial reactor to continue its cultivation. This process can be done in batch or continuous operation.

Vacuum extraction can be used in fermentation to remove ethanol from a reactor. When the liquid in the vessel is placed in vacuum conditions the ethanol begins to evaporate because its more volatile than the rest of the reactor contents. This technique requires an acclimation period for the yeast in the reactor to adapt to the lower pressure environment.

Product neutralization if a products inhibition due to its pH then it can be neutralized in the reactor and further processed downstream back into its original form.
