= Thiopurine methyltransferase =

Enzyme in humans

TPMT
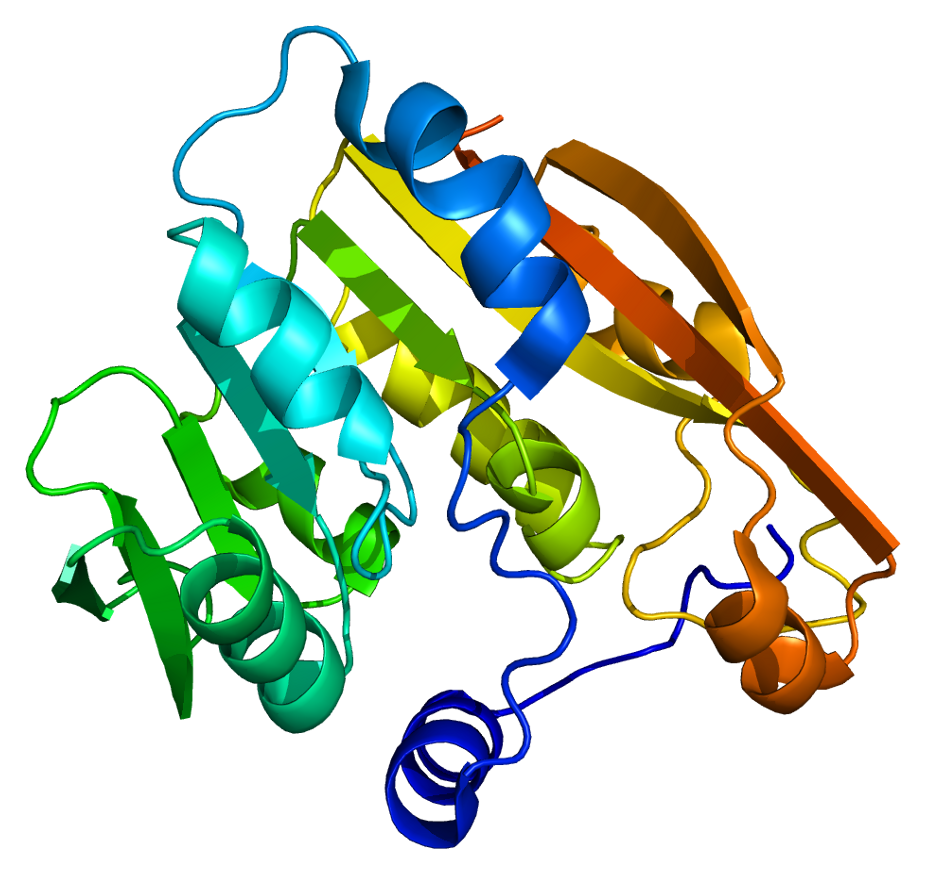

Identifiers
- Aliases: TPMT, entrez:7172, TPMTD, thiopurine S-methyltransferase
- External IDs: OMIM: 187680; MGI: 98812; GeneCards: TPMT
Available structures
PDB	Ortholog search: PDBe RCSB
PDB	List of PDB id codes 2BZG, 2H11
Enzyme activity
EC #	BRENDA	ExPASy	KEGG	MetaCyc
2.1.1.67	↗	↗	↗	↗

Gene location (Human)
Chr.	Chromosome 6 (human)
Band	6p22.3	Start	18,128,311 bp
Band	6p22.3	End	18,155,077 bp

Gene location (Mouse)
Chr.	Chromosome 13 (mouse)
Band	13 A5|13 24.5 cM	Start	47,175,958 bp
Band	13 A5|13 24.5 cM	End	47,198,213 bp
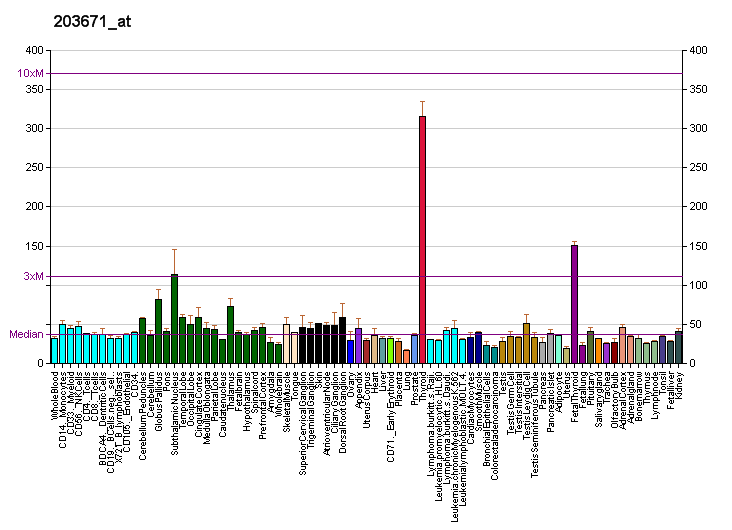

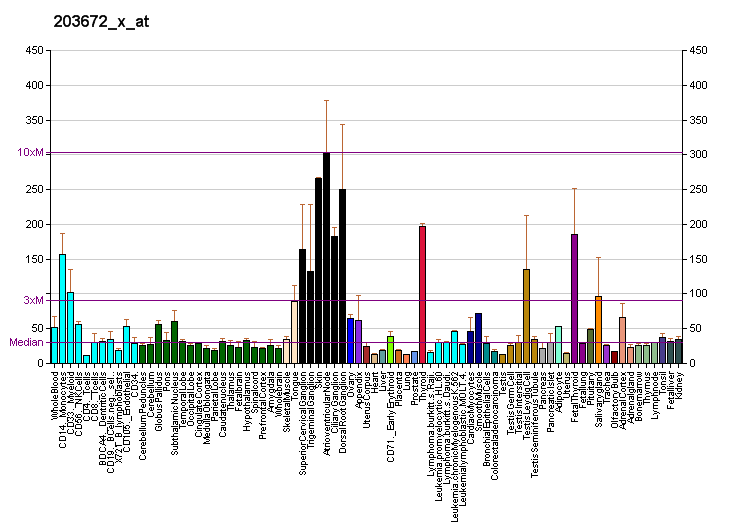
RNA expression pattern
Bgee	Human / Mouse (ortholog); Top expressed in: buccal mucosa cell; tendon of biceps brachii; rectum; left lobe of thyroid gland; right lobe of thyroid gland; internal globus pallidus; mucosa of transverse colon; right lobe of liver; mucosa of ileum; human kidney / Top expressed in: right kidney; proximal tubule; human kidney; left lobe of liver; zygote; primary oocyte; secondary oocyte; transitional epithelium of urinary bladder; tail of embryo; otic vesicle; More reference expression data
BioGPS	More reference expression data
Gene ontology
Molecular function	S-adenosylmethionine-dependent methyltransferase activity; transferase activity; methyltransferase activity; thiopurine S-methyltransferase activity; S-adenosyl-L-methionine binding
Cellular component	cytosol; cytoplasm
Biological process	nucleobase-containing compound metabolic process; methylation
Sources:Amigo / QuickGO
Orthologs
Databases	NCBI: entry; OMA: entry
Species	Human	Mouse
Entrez	7172	22017
Ensembl	ENSG00000137364	ENSMUSG00000021376
UniProt	P51580	O55060
RefSeq (mRNA)	NM_000367; NM_001346817; NM_001346818	NM_016785
RefSeq (protein)	NP_000358; NP_001333746; NP_001333747	NP_058065
Location (UCSC)	Chr 6: 18.13 – 18.16 Mb	Chr 13: 47.18 – 47.2 Mb
PubMed search
- Wikidata
View/Edit Human	View/Edit Mouse

Thiopurine methyltransferase or thiopurine S-methyltransferase (TPMT) is an enzyme that in humans is encoded by the TPMT gene. A pseudogene for this locus is located on chromosome 18q.

Thiopurine methyltransferase

== Function ==
thiopurine S-methyltransferase

Identifiers
- EC no.: 2.1.1.67
- CAS no.: 67339-09-7

Databases
- BRENDA: enzyme data
- ExPASy: NiceZyme view
- KEGG: enzyme entry
- MetaCyc: metabolic pathway
- Rhea: reactions
- PDB structures: RCSB PDB PDBe PDBsum
- Gene Ontology: AmiGO / QuickGO
Search
- PMC: articles
- PubMed: articles
- NCBI: proteins

Thiopurine methyltransferase methylates thiopurine compounds. The methyl donor is S-adenosyl-L-methionine (SAM), which is converted to S-adenosyl-L-homocysteine (SAH). This enzyme metabolizes thiopurine drugs via S-adenosyl-L-methionine as the S-methyl donor and S-adenosyl-L-homocysteine as a byproduct.

A typical reaction is the methylation of mercaptopurine to give 6-methylmercaptopurine.

Mercaptopurine
+ SAM
6-Methylmercaptopurine
+ SAH

== Clinical significance ==
Thiopurine drugs such as 6-mercaptopurine are used as chemotherapeutic agents and immunosuppressive drugs. Genetic polymorphisms that affect this enzyme's activity are correlated with variations in sensitivity and toxicity to such drugs. About 1/300 individual is deficient for the enzyme.

== Pharmacology ==
TPMT is best known for its role in the metabolism of the thiopurine drugs such as azathioprine, 6-mercaptopurine and 6-thioguanine. TPMT catalyzes the S-methylation of thiopurine drugs. Defects in the TPMT gene leads to decreased methylation and decreased inactivation of 6MP leading to enhanced bone marrow toxicity which may cause myelosuppression, anemia, bleeding tendency, leukopenia & infection. Allopurinol inhibits thiopurine S-methyltransferase, which can increase the utility of 6-MP.

== Diagnostic use ==
Measurement of TPMT activity is encouraged prior to commencing the treatment of patients with thiopurine drugs such as azathioprine, 6-mercaptopurine and 6-thioguanine. Patients with low activity (10% prevalence) or especially absent activity (prevalence 0.3%) are at a heightened risk of drug-induced bone marrow toxicity due to accumulation of the unmetabolised drug. Reuther et al. found that about 5% of all thiopurine therapies will fail due to toxicity. This intolerant group could be anticipated by routine measurement of TPMT activity. There appears to be a great deal of variation in TPMT mutation, with ethnic differences in mutation types accounting for variable responses to 6MP.

Genetic variants of TPMT have also been associated with cisplatin-induced ototoxicity in children. TPMT is now listed as a pharmacogenomic biomarker for adverse drug reactions to cisplatin by the FDA.

== See also ==
- Cancer pharmacogenomics
