= Thioinosinic acid =

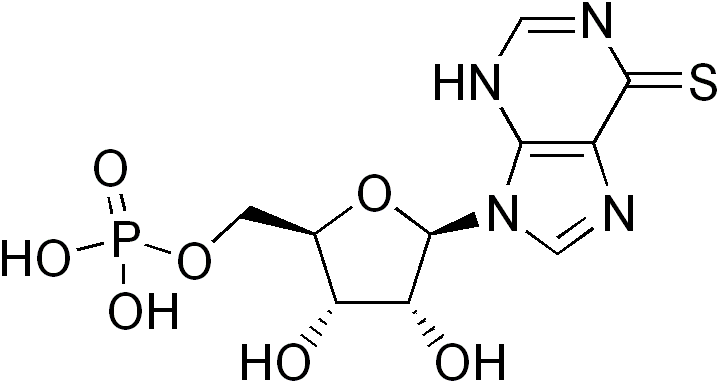

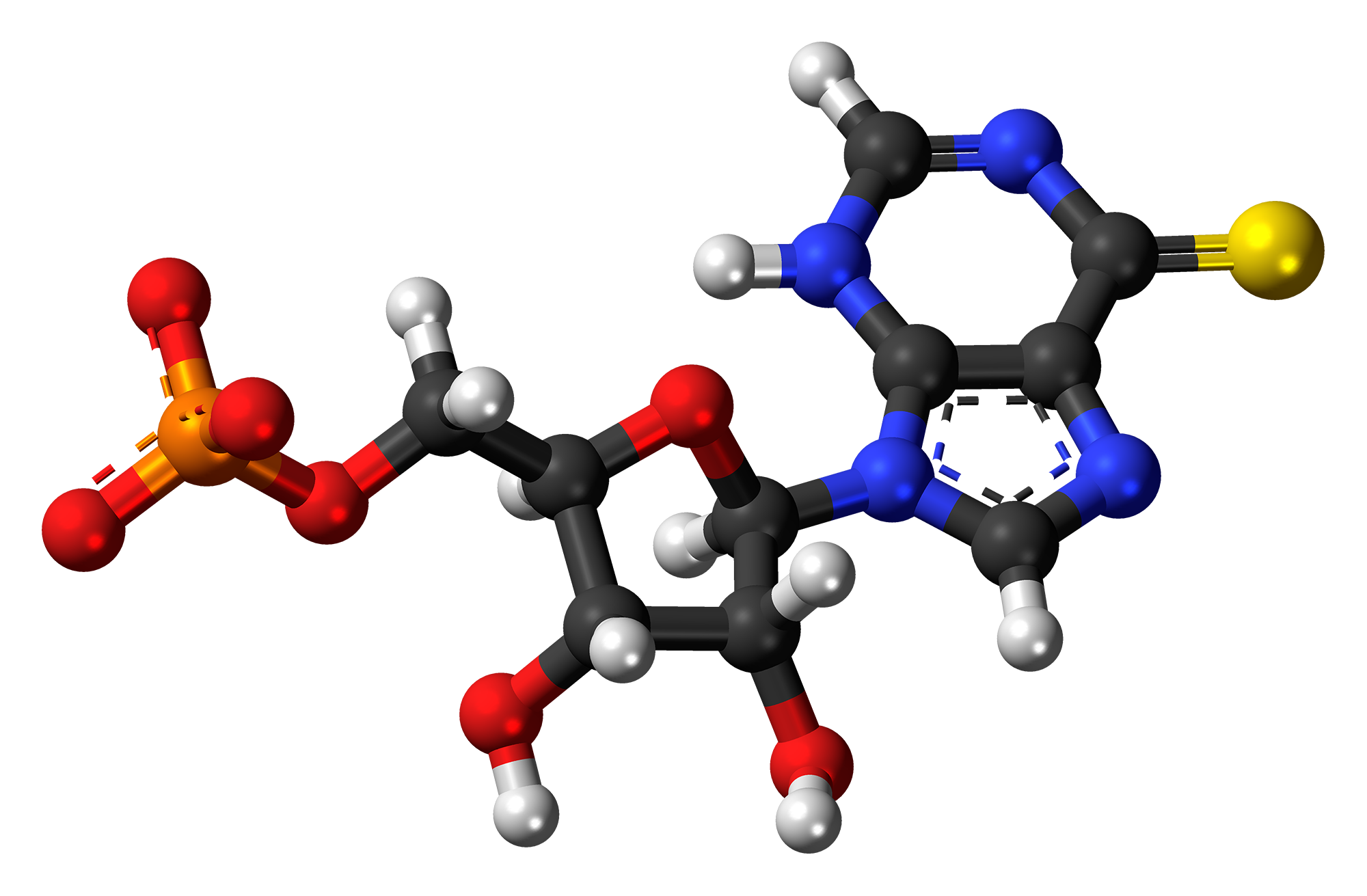

Names
- IUPAC name [(2R,3S,4R,5R)-3,4-Dihydroxy-5-(6-sulfanylidene-3H-purin-9-yl)oxolan-2-yl]methyl dihydrogen phosphate
- Other names Thioinosine monophosphate (TIMP)

Identifiers
CAS Number	53-83-8
3D model (JSmol)	Interactive image
ChemSpider	2298861
ECHA InfoCard	100.000.168
PubChem CID	3034391
UNII	76CK4YA5ZP
CompTox Dashboard (EPA)	DTXSID80926618
- InChI: InChI=1S/C10H13N4O7PS/c15-6-4(1-20-22(17,18)19)21-10(7(6)16)14-3-13-5-8(14)11-2-12-9(5)23/h2-4,6-7,10,15-16H,1H2,(H,11,12,23)(H2,17,18,19)/t4-,6-,7-,10-/m1/s1 Key: ZKRFOXLVOKTUTA-KQYNXXCUSA-N
- SMILES: O[C@H]1[C@@H](O)[C@H](N2C=NC3=C2NC=NC3=S)O[C@@H]1COP(O)(O)=O

Properties
Chemical formula	C_{10}H_{13}N_{4}O_{7}PS
Molar mass	364.27 g/mol
- Except where otherwise noted, data are given for materials in their standard state (at 25 °C [77 °F], 100 kPa). verify (what is ?) Infobox references

Thioinosinic acid (or thioinosine monophosphate, TIMP) is an intermediate metabolite of azathioprine, an immunosuppressive drug.
