= Deoxyguanosine triphosphate =

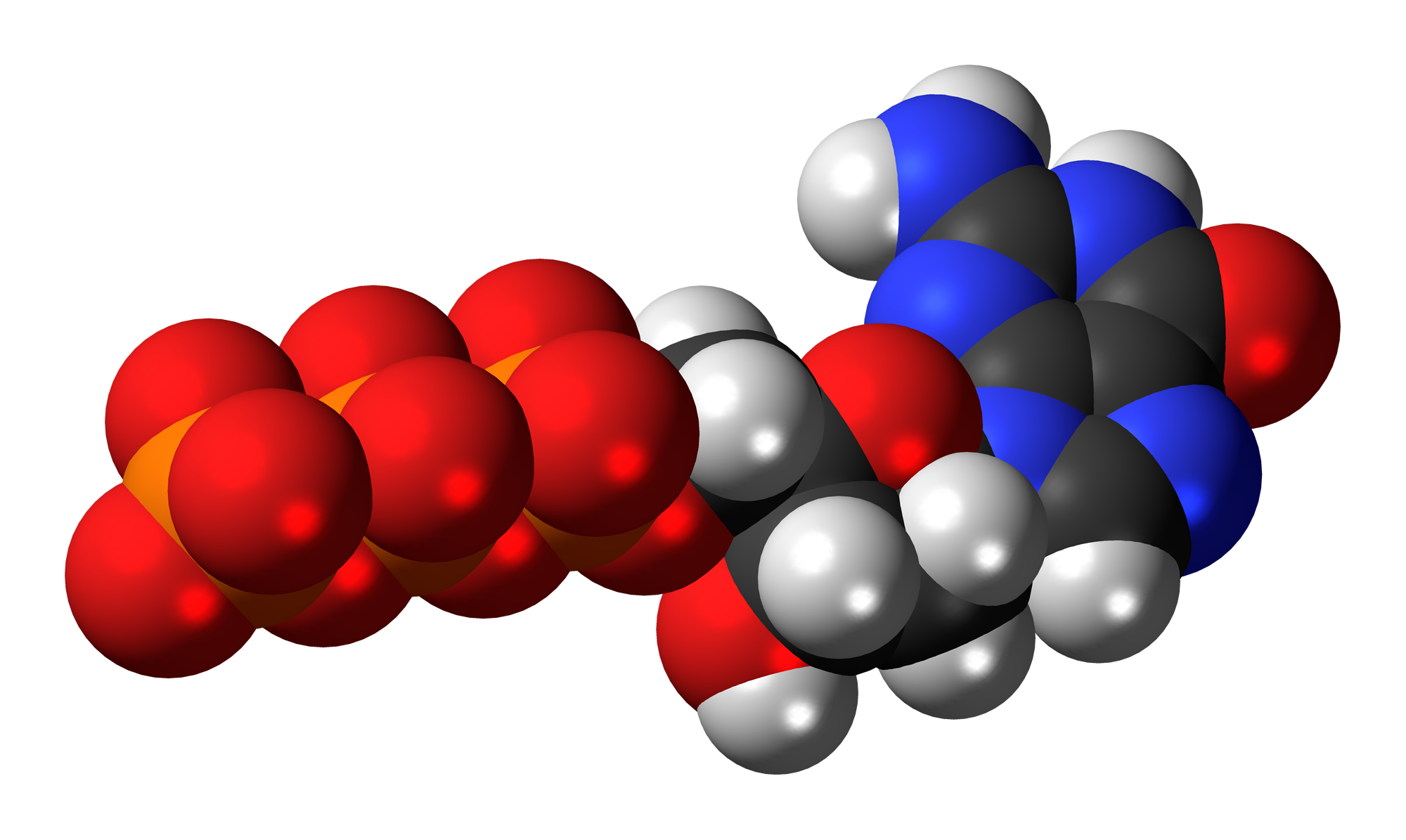

Names
- IUPAC name 2′-Deoxyguanosine 5′-(tetrahydrogen triphosphate)
- Systematic IUPAC name O^{1}-{[(2R,3S,5R)-5-(2-Amino-6-oxo-1,6-dihydro-9H-purin-9-yl)-3-hydroxyoxolan-2-yl]methyl} tetrahydrogen triphosphate

Identifiers
CAS Number	2564-35-4
3D model (JSmol)	Interactive image
ChEBI	CHEBI:16497
ChEMBL	ChEMBL477486
ChemSpider	58613
ECHA InfoCard	100.018.080
PubChem CID	65103
UNII	8C2O37Y44Q
CompTox Dashboard (EPA)	DTXSID60948499 DTXSID50917119, DTXSID60948499
- InChI: InChI=1S/C10H16N5O13P3/c11-10-13-8-7(9(17)14-10)12-3-15(8)6-1-4(16)5(26-6)2-25-30(21,22)28-31(23,24)27-29(18,19)20/h3-6,16H,1-2H2,(H,21,22)(H,23,24)(H2,18,19,20)(H3,11,13,14,17)/t4-,5+,6+/m0/s1 Key: HAAZLUGHYHWQIW-KVQBGUIXSA-N
- SMILES: O=P(O)(O)OP(=O)(O)OP(=O)(O)OC[C@H]3O[C@@H](n1cnc2c1NC(=N/C2=O)\N)C[C@@H]3O

Properties
Chemical formula	C_{10}H_{16}N_{5}O_{13}P_{3}
Molar mass	507.181023
- Except where otherwise noted, data are given for materials in their standard state (at 25 °C [77 °F], 100 kPa). verify (what is ?) Infobox references

Deoxyguanosine triphosphate (dGTP) is a nucleoside triphosphate, and a nucleotide precursor used in cells for DNA synthesis. The substance is used in the polymerase chain reaction technique, in sequencing, and in cloning. It is also the competitor of inhibition onset by acyclovir in the treatment of HSV virus.
