= Tioguanine =

Chemical compound

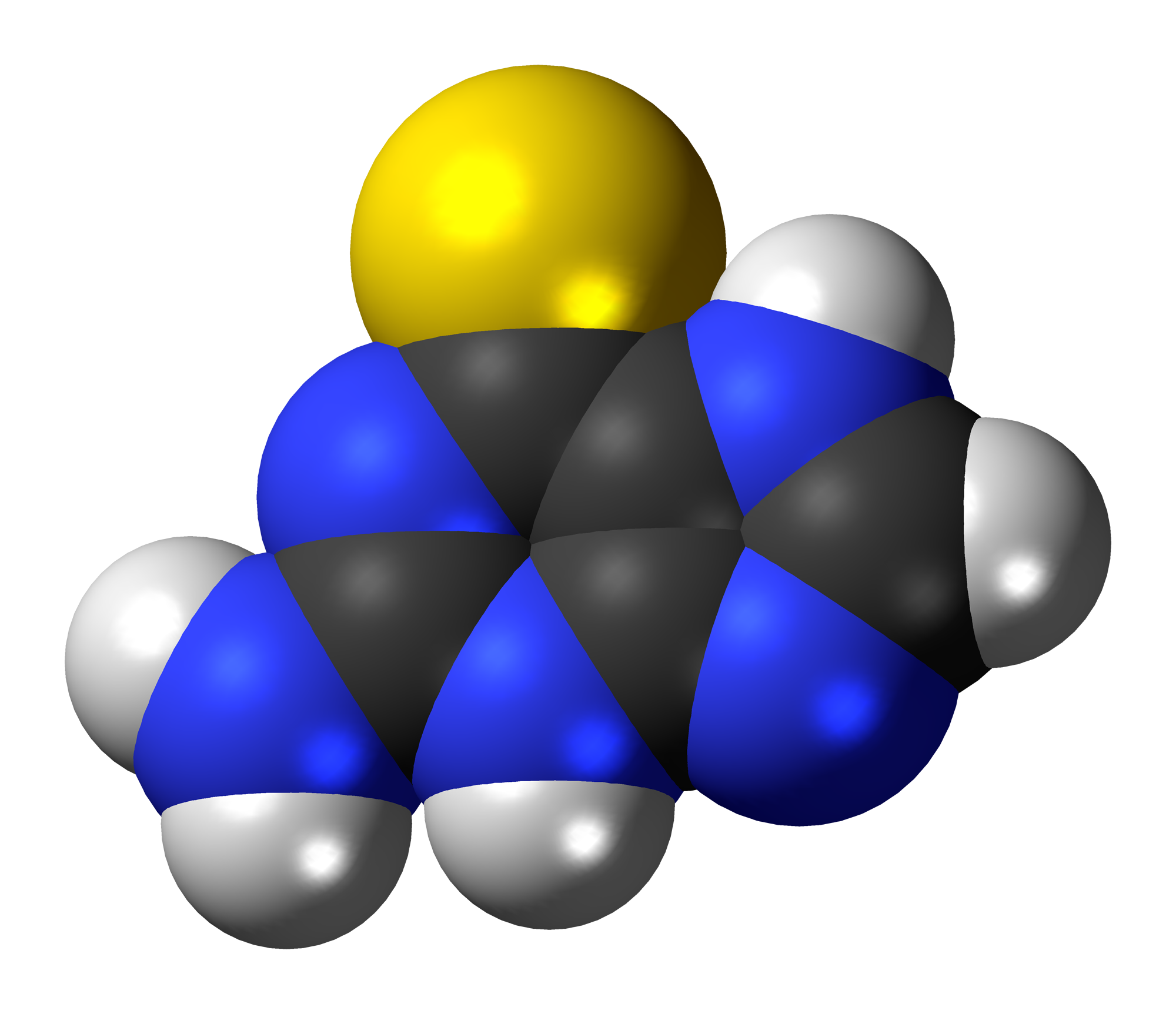

Clinical data
- Trade names: Lanvis, Tabloid, others
- AHFS/Drugs.com: International Drug Names
- MedlinePlus: a682099
- License data: US DailyMed: thioguanine
- Routes of administration: By mouth
- ATC code: L01BB03 (WHO)

Legal status
- Legal status: CA: ℞-only; In general: ℞ (Prescription only)

Pharmacokinetic data
- Bioavailability: 30% (range 14% to 46%)
- Metabolism: Intracellular
- Elimination half-life: 80 minutes (range 25–240 minutes)

Identifiers
- IUPAC name: 2-amino-1H-purine-6(7H)-thione
- CAS Number: 154-42-7
- PubChem CID: 2723601
- IUPHAR/BPS: 6845
- DrugBank: DB00352
- ChemSpider: 2005804
- UNII: WIX31ZPX66
- KEGG: D08603
- ChEBI: CHEBI:9555
- ChEMBL: ChEMBL727
- CompTox Dashboard (EPA): DTXSID6023652
- ECHA InfoCard: 100.005.299

Chemical and physical data
- Formula: C_{5}H_{5}N_{5}S
- Molar mass: 167.19 g·mol^{−1}
- 3D model (JSmol): Interactive image
- SMILES: Nc2nc(=S)c1[nH]cnc1[nH]2
- InChI: InChI=1S/C5H5N5S/c6-5-9-3-2(4(11)10-5)7-1-8-3/h1H,(H4,6,7,8,9,10,11); Key:WYWHKKSPHMUBEB-UHFFFAOYSA-N

Tioguanine, also known as thioguanine or 6-thioguanine (6-TG) , sold under the brand name Tabloid among others, is a medication used to treat acute myeloid leukemia (AML), acute lymphocytic leukemia (ALL), and chronic myeloid leukemia (CML). Long-term use is not recommended. It is given by mouth.

Common side effects include bone marrow suppression, liver problems and inflammation of the mouth. It is recommended that liver enzymes be checked weekly when on the medication. People with a genetic deficiency in thiopurine S-methyltransferase are at higher risk of side effects. Avoiding pregnancy when on the medication is recommended. Tioguanine is in the antimetabolite family of medications. It is a purine analogue of guanine and works by disrupting DNA and RNA.

Tioguanine was developed between 1949 and 1951. It is on the World Health Organization's List of Essential Medicines.

== Medical uses ==
- Acute leukemias in both adults and children
- Chronic myelogenous leukemia
- Inflammatory bowel disease, especially ulcerative colitis
- Psoriasis
- Colorectal cancer in mice resistant to immunotherapy

== Side effects ==
- Leukopenia and neutropenia
- Thrombocytopenia
- Anemia
- Anorexia
- Nausea and vomiting
- Hepatotoxicity: this manifests as:

=== Hepatic veno-occlusive disease ===
The major concern that has inhibited the use of thioguanine has been veno-occlusive disease (VOD) and its histological precursor nodular regenerative hyperplasia (NRH). The incidence of NRH with thioguanine was reported as between 33 and 76%. The risk of ensuing VOD is serious and frequently irreversible so this side effect has been a major concern. However, recent evidence using an animal model for thioguanine-induced NRH/VOD has shown that, contrary to previous assumptions, NRH/VOD is dose dependent and the mechanism for this has been demonstrated. This has been confirmed in human trials, where thioguanine has proven to be safe but efficacious for coeliac disease when used at doses below those commonly prescribed. This has led to a revival of interest in thioguanine because of its higher efficacy and faster action compared to other thiopurines and immunosuppressants such as mycophenylate.

== Contraindications ==
- Pregnancy
- Lactation: The safety warning against breastfeeding may have been a conservative assessment, but research evidence suggests that thiopurines do not enter breastmilk.

== Interactions ==
Cancers that do not respond to treatment with mercaptopurine do not respond to thioguanine. On the other hand, some cases of IBD that are resistant to mercaptopurine (or its pro-drug azathioprine) may be responsive to thioguanine.

== Pharmacogenetics ==
The enzyme thiopurine S-methyltransferase (TPMT) is responsible for the direct inactivation of thioguanine to its methylthioguanine base – this methylation prevents thioguanine from further conversion into active, cytotoxic thioguanine nucleotide (TGN) metabolites. Certain genetic variations within the TPMT gene can lead to decreased or absent TPMT enzyme activity, and individuals who are homozygous or heterozygous for these types of genetic variations may have increased levels of TGN metabolites and an increased risk of severe bone marrow suppression (myelosuppression) when receiving thioguanine. In many ethnicities, TPMT polymorphisms that result in decreased or absent TPMT activity occur with a frequency of approximately 5%, meaning that about 0.25% of patients are homozygous for these variants. However, an assay of TPMT activity in red blood cells or a TPMT genetic test can identify patients with reduced TPMT activity, allowing for the adjustment of thiopurine dose or avoidance of the drug entirely. The FDA-approved drug label for thioguanine notes that patients who are TPMT-deficient may be prone to developing myelosuppression and that laboratories offer testing for TPMT deficiency. Indeed, testing for TPMT activity is currently one of the few examples of pharmacogenetics being translated into routine clinical care.

== Metabolism and pharmacokinetics ==
A single oral dose of thioguanine has incomplete metabolism, absorption and high interindividual variability. The bioavailability of thioguanine has an average of 30% (range 14-46%). The maximum concentration in plasma after a single oral dose is attained after 8 hours.

Thioguanine, like other thiopurines, is cytotoxic to white cells; as a result it is immunosuppressive at lower doses and anti-leukemic/anti-neoplastic at higher doses. Thioguanine is incorporated into human bone marrow cells, but like other thiopurines, it is not known to cross the blood-brain barrier. Thioguanine cannot be demonstrated in cerebrospinal fluid, similar to the closely related compound 6-mercaptopurine which also cannot penetrate to the brain.

The plasma half-life of thioguanine is short, due to the rapid uptake into liver and blood cells and conversion to 6-TGN. The median plasma half-life of 80-minutes with a range of 25–240 minutes. Thioguanine is excreted primarily through the kidneys in urine, but mainly as a metabolite, 2-amino-6-methylthiopurine. However, the intra-cellular thio-nucleotide metabolites of thioguanine (6-TGN) have longer half-lives and can therefore be measured after thioguanine is eliminated from the plasma.

Thioguanine is catabolized (broken down) via two pathways. One route is through the deamination by the enzyme guanine deaminase to 6-thioxanthine, which has minimal anti-neoplastic activity, then by oxidation by xanthine oxidase of the thioxanthine to thiouric acid. This metabolic pathway is not dependent on the efficacy of xanthine oxidase, so that the inhibitor of xanthine oxidase, the drug allopurinol, does not block the breakdown of thioguanine, in contrast to its inhibition of the breakdown of the related thiopurine 6-mercaptopurine. The second pathway is the methylation of thioguanine to 2-amino-6-methylthiopurine, which is minimally effective as an anti-neoplastic and significantly less toxic than thioguanine. This pathway also is independent of the enzyme activity of xanthine oxidase.

== Mechanism of action ==
6-Thioguanine is a thio analogue of the naturally occurring purine base guanine. 6-thioguanine utilises the enzyme hypoxanthine-guanine phosphoribosyltransferase (HGPRTase) to be converted to 6-thioguanosine monophosphate (TGMP). High concentrations of TGMP may accumulate intracellularly and hamper the synthesis of guanine nucleotides via the enzyme Inosine monophosphate dehydrogenase (IMP dehydrogenase), leading to DNA mutations.

TGMP is converted by phosphorylation to thioguanosine diphosphate (TGDP) and thioguanosine triphosphate (TGTP). Simultaneously deoxyribosyl analogs are formed, via the enzyme ribonucleotide reductase. The TGMP, TGDP and TGTP are collectively named 6-thioguanine nucleotides (6-TGN). 6-TGN are cytotoxic to cells by: (1) incorporation into DNA during the synthesis phase (S-phase) of the cell; and (2) through inhibition of the GTP-binding protein (G protein) Rac1, which regulates the Rac/Vav pathway.

== Chemistry ==
It is a pale yellow, odorless, crystalline powder. The structure has been confirmed by X-ray crystallography.

== Names ==
Tioguanine (INN, BAN, AAN), or thioguanine (USAN).

Thioguanine is administered by mouth (as a tablet – 'Lanvis').
