= Mercaptopurine =

Chemical compound

Clinical data
- Trade names: Purinethol, Purixan, others
- Other names: 6-mercaptopurine (6-MP)
- AHFS/Drugs.com: Monograph
- MedlinePlus: a682653
- License data: US DailyMed: Mercaptopurine
- Routes of administration: By mouth
- ATC code: L01BB02 (WHO)

Legal status
- Legal status: AU: S4 (Prescription only); EU: Rx-only; In general: ℞ (Prescription only)

Pharmacokinetic data
- Bioavailability: 5 to 37%
- Metabolism: xanthine oxidase
- Elimination half-life: 60 to 120 min., longer for its active metabolites
- Excretion: kidney

Identifiers
- IUPAC name: 3,7-dihydropurine-6-thione
- CAS Number: 50-44-2
- PubChem CID: 667490
- IUPHAR/BPS: 7226
- DrugBank: DB01033
- ChemSpider: 580869
- UNII: PKK6MUZ20G
- KEGG: D04931
- ChEBI: CHEBI:50667
- ChEMBL: ChEMBL1425
- CompTox Dashboard (EPA): DTXSID0020810
- ECHA InfoCard: 100.000.035

Chemical and physical data
- Formula: C_{5}H_{4}N_{4}S
- Molar mass: 152.18 g·mol^{−1}
- 3D model (JSmol): Interactive image
- SMILES: S=c1nc[nH]c2nc[nH]c12
- InChI: InChI=1S/C5H4N4S/c10-5-3-4(7-1-6-3)8-2-9-5/h1-2H,(H2,6,7,8,9,10); Key:GLVAUDGFNGKCSF-UHFFFAOYSA-N

Mercaptopurine (6-MP), sold under the brand name Purinethol among others, is a medication used for cancer and autoimmune diseases. Specifically it is used to treat acute lymphocytic leukemia (ALL), acute promyelocytic leukemia (APL), Crohn's disease, and ulcerative colitis. For acute lymphocytic leukemia it is generally used with methotrexate. It is taken orally.

Common side effects include bone marrow suppression, liver toxicity, vomiting, and loss of appetite. Other serious side effects include an increased risk of future cancer and pancreatitis. Those with a genetic deficiency in thiopurine S-methyltransferase are at higher risk of side effects. Use in pregnancy may harm the baby. Mercaptopurine is in the thiopurine and antimetabolite family of medications.

Mercaptopurine was approved for medical use in the United States in 1953. It is on the World Health Organization's List of Essential Medicines.

== Medical uses ==
It is used to treat acute lymphocytic leukemia, Crohn's disease, and ulcerative colitis.

== Side effects ==
Some of the adverse reactions of taking mercaptopurine may include diarrhea, nausea, vomiting, loss of appetite, fatigue, stomach/abdominal pain, weakness, skin rash, darkening of the skin, and hair loss. Serious adverse reactions include mouth sores, fever, sore throat, easy bruising or bleeding, pinpoint red spots on the skin, yellowing of eyes or skin, dark urine, and painful or difficult urination. Other more serious side effects include black or tarry stools (melena), bloody stools, and bloody urine. Treatment is discontinued in up to 30% of patients due these effects but therapeutic drug monitoring of the biologically active metabolites, i.e. thiopurine nucleotides can help to optimize the efficacy and safety. Clinically, most hospitals resort to on-exchange LC-MS (liquid chromatography - mass spectrometry) but the newly developed approach of porous graphitic carbon based chromatography hyphenated with mass spectrometry appears superior with respect to patient care in this respect.

Symptoms of allergic reaction to mercaptopurine include rash, itching, swelling, dizziness, trouble breathing, and inflammation of the pancreas.

In some cases, mercaptopurine may suppress the production of blood cells, both white blood cells and red blood cells. It may be toxic to bone marrow. Quarterly blood counts are necessary for people on mercaptopurine. People should stop taking the medication at least temporarily while considering alternative treatment if there is an unexplained, abnormally large drop in white blood cell count, or any other blood count.

Toxicity of mercaptopurine can be linked to genetic polymorphisms in thiopurine S-methyltransferase (TPMT), nudix hydrolase 15 (NUDT15), and inosine triphosphate pyrophosphatase (ITPA). People with specific allele variants will require dose adjustments, especially for those with homozygous variant genotypes. Large differences of TPMT and NUDT15 among ethnicities in terms of variant allele frequency should be taken into consideration in clinical practice. Caucasian people with a variant allele of the ITPA gene, experience higher rates of febrile neuropenia than people of other ethnic groups, due to differences in allelic frequencies among ethnicities.

=== Precautions ===
Mercaptopurine can lower the body's ability to fight off infection. Those taking it should get permission from a doctor to receive immunizations and vaccinations. It is also recommended that, while on the drug, one should avoid those having recently received oral polio vaccine.

This drug was formerly not recommended during pregnancy and early evidence indicated pregnant women on the drug (or the related azathioprine) showed a seven-fold incidence of fetal abnormalities as well as a 20-fold increase in miscarriage. There were also anecdotal reports linking mercaptopurine with spontaneous abortion, leading to the US FDA rating both AZA and mercaptopurine as category D drugs. However, Davis et al. 1999 found mercaptopurine, compared to methotrexate, was ineffective as a single-agent abortifacient; every woman in the mercaptopurine arm of the study had fetal cardiac activity at follow-up (two weeks later) and was given a suction abortion. A more recent, larger study, however, performed by the Cancers et Surrisque Associe aux Maladies inflamatoires intestinales En France (CESAME) indicated an overall rate of congenital malformations not significantly greater than the general population in France. The European Crohn's and Colitis Organisation (ECCO) concluded in a consensus paper in 2010 that while AZA and mercaptopurine have an FDA rating of D, new research in both animals and humans indicates that "thiopurines are safe and well tolerated during pregnancy."

Mercaptopurine causes changes to chromosomes in animals and humans, though a study in 1990 found, "while the carcinogenic potential of 6-MP cannot be precluded, it can be only very weak or marginal." Another study in 1999 noted an increased risk of developing leukemia when taking large doses of 6-MP with other cytotoxic drugs.

== Drug interactions ==
Allopurinol inhibits xanthine oxidase, the enzyme that breaks down mercaptopurine. Those taking allopurinol (often used to prevent gout) are at risk for mercaptopurine toxicity. The dose should be reduced or allopurinol should be discontinued. Several published studies have demonstrated that the use of allopurinol in combination with low dose 6-MP helps reduce 6-MP levels, which are toxic to liver tissue, whilst increasing the therapeutic levels of 6-MP for some inflammatory conditions.

== Mechanisms of action ==
Official information from the package insert for purinethol:

- Mercaptopurine is an antimetabolite antineoplastic; as such it interferes with normal metabolic processes within cells, typically by combining with enzymes, to disrupt DNA and RNA synthesis (cell-cycle S phase-specific) leading to death of rapidly proliferating cells, especially malignant ones. Specifically, Mercaptopurine is a purine antimetabolite or purine antagonist and as such inhibits DNA synthesis by inhibiting the production of the purine containing nucleotides, adenine and guanine, thus halting DNA synthesis. Mercaptopurine also acts as an immunomodulator by inhibiting several pathways in nucleic acid biosynthesis preventing proliferation of cells involved in the determination and amplification of the immune response.
- Mercaptopurine (6-MP) competes with the purine derivatives hypoxanthine and guanine for the enzyme HGPRT and is itself converted to thioinosine monophosphate (TIMP).
  - TIMP inhibits several chemical reactions involving inosinic acid (IMP), including the conversion of IMP to xanthylic acid (XMP) and the conversion of IMP to adenylic acid (AMP) via adenylosuccinate (SAMP).
  - In addition, 6-methylthioinosinate (MTIMP) is formed by the methylation of TIMP.
    - Both TIMP and MTIMP have been reported to inhibit glutamine-5-phosphoribosylpyrophosphate amidotransferase, the first enzyme unique to the de novo pathway for purine ribonucleotide synthesis. Experiments indicate that radiolabeled mercaptopurine may be recovered from the DNA in the form of deoxythioguanosine.
- Some mercaptopurine is converted to nucleotide derivatives of 6-thioguanine (6-TG) by the sequential actions of inosinate (IMP) dehydrogenase and xanthylate (XMP) aminase, converting TIMP to thioguanylic acid (TGMP).
- Animal tumors that are resistant to mercaptopurine often have lost the ability to convert mercaptopurine to TIMP. However, it is clear that resistance to mercaptopurine may be acquired by other means as well, particularly in human leukemias.
- It is not known exactly which of any one or more of the biochemical effects of mercaptopurine and its metabolites are directly or predominantly responsible for cell death.

6-MP ribonucleotide inhibits purine nucleotide synthesis and metabolism by inhibiting an enzyme called phosphoribosyl pyrophosphate amidotransferase (PRPP amidotransferase). Since this enzyme is the rate limiting factor for purine synthesis, this alters the synthesis and function of RNA and DNA. Mercaptopurine interferes with nucleotide interconversion and glycoprotein synthesis.

=== Pharmacogenetics ===
The enzyme thiopurine S-methyltransferase (TPMT) is responsible, in part, for the inactivation of 6-mercaptopurine. TPMT catalyzes the methylation of 6-mercaptopurine into the inactive metabolite 6-methylmercaptopurine – this methylation prevents mercaptopurine from further conversion into active, cytotoxic thioguanine nucleotide (TGN) metabolites. Certain genetic variations within the TPMT gene can lead to decreased or absent TPMT enzyme activity, and individuals who are homozygous or heterozygous for these types of genetic variations may have increased levels of TGN metabolites and an increased risk of severe bone marrow suppression (myelosuppression) when receiving mercaptopurine. In many ethnicities, TPMT polymorphisms that result in decreased or absent TPMT activity occur with a frequency of approximately 5%, meaning that about 0.25% of people are homozygous for these variants. However, an assay of TPMT activity in red blood cells or a TPMT genetic test can identify people with reduced TPMT activity, allowing for the adjustment of mercaptopurine dose or avoidance of the drug entirely. The FDA-approved drug label for mercaptopurine recommends testing for TPMT activity to identify people at risk for myelotoxicity. Testing for TPMT activity is an example of pharmacogenetics being translated into routine clinical care.

== History ==
6-MP was discovered by Nobel Prize–winning scientists Gertrude B. Elion and George H. Hitchings at Burroughs Wellcome in Tuckahoe, New York, and was clinically developed in collaboration with investigators at Memorial Hospital (now Memorial Sloan Kettering Cancer Center in New York City). The collaboration was initiated by Cornelius P. Rhoads, who had run chemical weapons programs for the US Army and had been involved in the work that led to the discovery that nitrogen mustards could potentially be used as cancer drugs, and had become the director of Memorial in 1948.
