= Bone marrow suppression =

- Other names: Myelotoxicity, myelosuppression
- Specialty: Oncology

Bone marrow suppression also known as myelotoxicity or myelosuppression, is the decrease in production of cells responsible for providing immunity (leukocytes), carrying oxygen (erythrocytes), and/or those responsible for normal blood clotting (thrombocytes). Bone marrow suppression is a serious side effect of chemotherapy and certain drugs affecting the immune system such as azathioprine. The risk is especially high in cytotoxic chemotherapy for leukemia. In the case of non-small-cell lung cancer, myelosuppression predisposition was shown to be modulated by enhancer mutations.

Nonsteroidal anti-inflammatory drugs (NSAIDs), in some rare instances, may also cause bone marrow suppression. The decrease in blood cell counts does not occur right at the start of chemotherapy because the drugs do not destroy the cells already in the bloodstream (these are not dividing rapidly). Instead, the drugs affect new blood cells that are being made by the bone marrow. When myelosuppression is severe, it is called myeloablation.

Many other drugs including common antibiotics may cause bone marrow suppression. Unlike chemotherapy the effects may not be due to direct destruction of stem cells but the results may be equally serious. The treatment may mirror that of chemotherapy-induced myelosuppression or may be to change to an alternate drug or to temporarily suspend treatment.

Because the bone marrow is the manufacturing center of blood cells, the suppression of bone marrow activity causes a deficiency of blood cells. This condition can rapidly lead to life-threatening infection, as the body cannot produce leukocytes in response to invading bacteria and viruses, as well as leading to anaemia due to a lack of red blood cells and spontaneous severe bleeding due to deficiency of platelets.

Parvovirus B19 inhibits erythropoiesis by lytically infecting RBC precursors in the bone marrow and is associated with a number of different diseases ranging from benign to severe. In immunocompromised patients, B19 infection may persist for months, leading to chronic anemia with B19 viremia due to chronic marrow suppression.

== Treatment ==
Bone marrow suppression due to azathioprine can be treated by changing to another medication such as mycophenolate mofetil (for organ transplants) or other disease-modifying drugs in rheumatoid arthritis or Crohn's disease.

=== Chemotherapy induced myelosuppression ===
Bone marrow suppression due to anti-cancer chemotherapy is much harder to treat and often involves hospital admission, strict infection control, and aggressive use of intravenous antibiotics at the first sign of infection.

G-CSF is used clinically (see Neutropenia) but tests in mice suggest it may lead to bone loss.

GM-CSF has been compared to G-CSF as a treatment of chemotherapy-induced myelosuppression/Neutropenia.

Trilaciclib (COSELA), a CDK4/6 inhibitor, is administered before chemotherapy in small cell lung cancer to control chemotherapy-induced myelosuppression.

== Research ==
In developing new chemotherapeutics, the efficacy of the drug against the disease is often balanced against the likely level of myelotoxicity the drug will cause. In-vitro colony forming cell (CFC) assays using normal human bone marrow grown in appropriate semi-solid media such as ColonyGEL have been shown to be useful in predicting the level of clinical myelotoxicity a certain compound might cause if administered to humans. These predictive in-vitro assays reveal effects the administered compounds have on the bone marrow progenitor cells that produce the various mature cells in the blood and can be used to test the effects of single drugs or the effects of drugs administered in combination with others.

== See also ==
- Hematopoietic stem cell transplantation
- Neutropenia, low leukocytes
