= Robert Yarchoan =

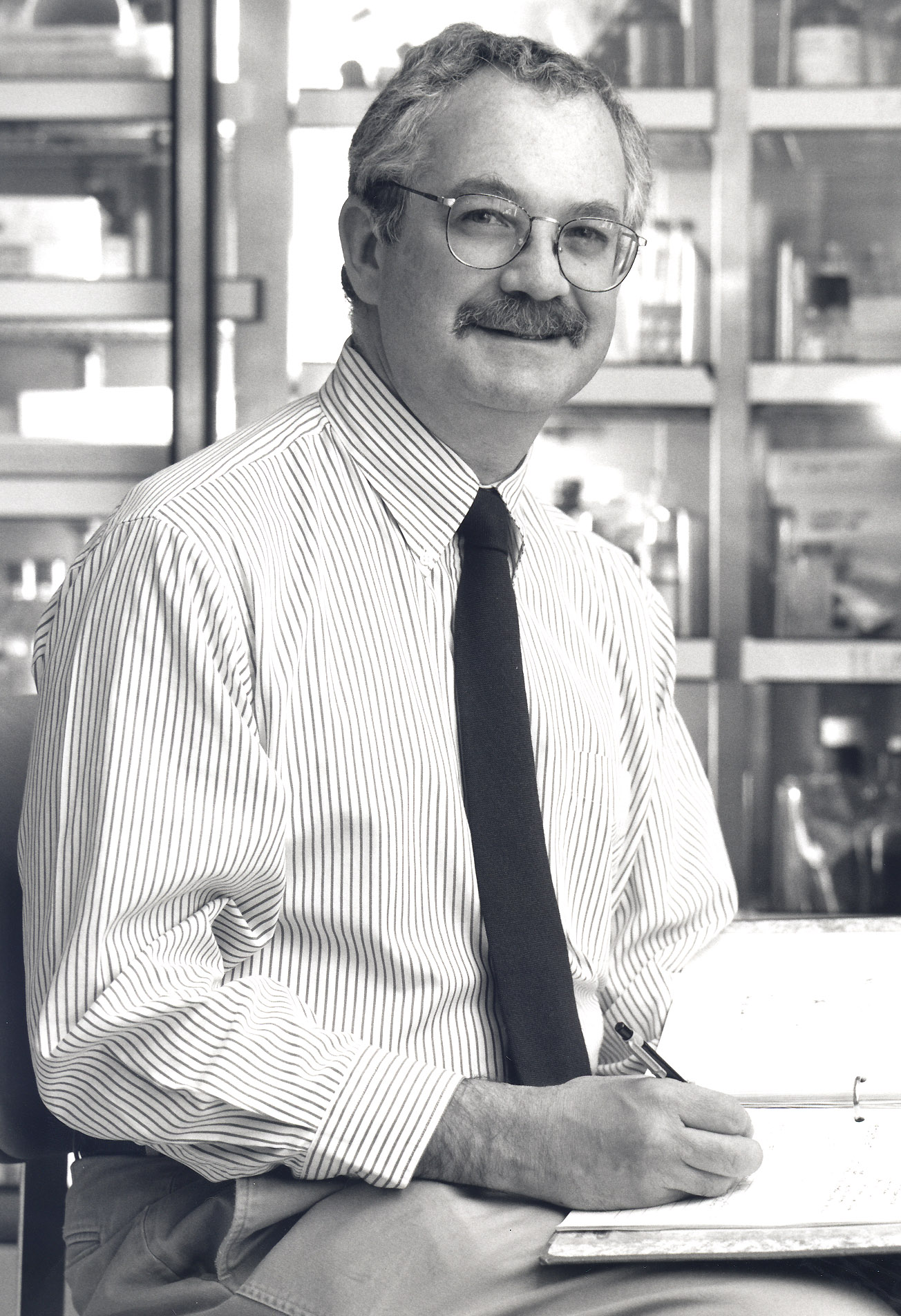
- Born: 1950 (age 75–76); Oceanside, New York, U.S.
- Education: Amherst College; Perelman School of Medicine at the University of Pennsylvania
- Known for: Development of early antiretroviral therapies for HIV/AIDS
- Spouse: Giovanna Tosato
- Children: Mark Yarchoan, John Yarchoan
- Scientific career
- Fields: Oncology, Immunology, HIV/AIDS research
- Institutions: National Cancer Institute

Robert Yarchoan (born 1950) is a medical researcher who played an important role in the development of the first effective drugs for AIDS. He is the Chief of the HIV and AIDS Malignancy Branch in the National Cancer Institute (NCI) and also coordinates HIV/AIDS malignancy research throughout the NCI as director of the Office of HIV and AIDS Malignancy.

== Education and career ==
Yarchoan was raised in Oceanside, New York. He graduated from Amherst College in 1971 with a degree in biophysics and received his M.D. from the Perelman School of Medicine at the University of Pennsylvania in 1975. He completed internship and residency training in internal medicine at the University of Minnesota and subsequently trained in immunology in the Metabolism Branch of the NCI.

After completing his training he joined the laboratory of Dr. Samuel Broder. In 1991 he was appointed to be a Section Chief of the Medicine Branch and in 1996 he named chief of the newly formed HIV and AIDS Malignancy Branch. Dr. Yarchoan was also appointed to be the first director of the NCI Office of HIV and AIDS Malignancy in 2007, which supervises all HIV/AIDS and AIDS malignancy research within the NCI.

== Medical and Research Achievements ==
Along with his colleagues Drs. Samuel Broder and Hiroaki Mitsuya in the National Cancer Institute (NCI), he co-developed the first effective treatments for HIV/AIDS. With his colleagues, he conducted the first clinical trials of zidovudine (AZT), didanosine (ddI), zalcitabine (ddC), and lamivudine (3TC). These trials were the first to demonstrate that administration of anti-retroviral drugs could reverse the declines in CD4 cells and immunologic impairment caused by human immunodeficiency virus (HIV) infection. Dr. Yarchoan also conducted the first trials of combination anti-HIV therapy.

The development of these drugs was a breakthrough in AIDS therapy. Zidovudine and didanosine were components of early highly active antiretroviral drug therapy (HAART), and zidovudine, didanosine, and lamivudine remain in widespread use and are included in the World Health Organization's "Essential Drugs List", which is a list of minimum medical needs for a basic health care system. It is estimated that the development of these and other AIDS drugs have saved over 3 million life-years in the United States and over 15 million life-years throughout the world. His research efforts have also focused on AIDS malignancies, focusing on the pathogenesis and treatment of Kaposi's sarcoma and other virus-associated tumors. He led the first clinical studies showing that paclitaxel was an effective therapy for Kaposi's sarcoma and that thalidomide has activity in this disease. He also developed several novel therapies for Multicentric Castleman's disease caused by Kaposi's sarcoma-associated herpesvirus (KSHV), also called human herpesvirus-8 [HHV-8]. With his colleagues at NCI, he also identified a new disease called KSHV-Associated Cytokine Syndrome (KICS) in some people with HIV/AIDS.

== Awards and honors ==
Yarchoan is a co-editor of several journals. He has received many awards, including the Assistant Secretary for Health Award and the U.S. Public Health Service Outstanding Service Medal. He also was awarded the first National Institutes of Health (NIH) World AIDS Day Award in December, 2006 for his work in developing drugs for AIDS. In November, 2007, he was awarded the NCI HIV/AIDS Research Excellence Award along with his colleagues, Drs. Samuel Broder, Robert C. Gallo, and Hiroaki Mitsuya. In October 2009, he received the National Cancer Institute Director's Awards of Merit for leadership in promoting and supporting HIV/AIDS research and HIV-associated malignancies at the National Cancer Institute, and in 2014 received the American Society for Microbiology Award in Clinical and Diagnostic Immunology. He has been inducted as a member of the American Society for Clinical Investigation, a Fellow of the American Association for the Advancement of Science (AAAS), and in 2016 as a member of the Association of American Physicians. In 2013, Dr. Yarchoan received an honorary degree for his contributions to HIV/AIDS research from his alma mater, Amherst College.

== Personal life ==
Yarchoan is married to Italian–American scientist Giovanna Tosato of the National Cancer Institute, and is the father of physician-scientist Mark Yarchoan of Johns Hopkins University and John Yarchoan.
