= Janet Rideout =

Organic chemist

Janet Litster Rideout
- Born: January 6, 1939 (age 87); Bennington, Vermont, US
- Education: Mount Holyoke College, State University of New York, Buffalo
- Known for: application of AZT to HIV
- Scientific career
- Fields: organic chemistry; nucleoside chemistry
- Workplaces: Burroughs Wellcome, Inspire Pharmaceuticals

Janet Rideout is an American organic chemist and one of the scientists who discovered that azidothymidine (AZT) could be used as an antiretroviral agent to treat Human Immunodeficiency Virus (HIV). She also played a key role in the development of acyclovir, the first effective treatment for herpes simplex virus.

== Early life and education ==
Janet Rideout was born Janet Litster January 6, 1939, in Bennington, Vermont. She received bachelor's and master's degrees in chemistry from Mount Holyoke College. She then earned a PhD in organic chemistry from State University of New York, Buffalo in 1968.

== Research and career ==
Shortly before graduation from the State University of New York, Buffalo, Rideout was hired by chemist and future Nobel laureate Gertrude Elion to work at a small US subsidiary of the British pharmaceutical company Burroughs Wellcome Company (now GlaxoSmithKline). Initially located in Tuckahoe (village), New York, the branch moved to Research Triangle, North Carolina, in 1970.

Rideout specialized in nucleoside chemistry. Nucelosides are chemical compounds consisting of a pentose sugar bound to a nitrogenous base. When phosphorylated, nucleosides become nucleotides, which are the building blocks of nucleic acids (DNA and RNA). As such, they're needed for replication (copying of the genome before cells divide so that each gets a copy). Therefore, cells that replicate frequently, such as cancer cells and bacteria have a high demand for nucleosides. Recognizing this, teams of scientists, including a team at Burroughs Wellcome including Janet Rideout dedicated themselves to studying chemical analogs that could mimic natural nucleosides, inhibiting replication.

=== Arabinosides ===
One branch of Rideout's research involved the synthesis of purine arabinosides (similar in structure to the canonical nucleosides found in DNA and RNA, but containing the sugar arabinose instead of ribose or deoxyribose). Rideout synthesized the nucleoside analog diaminopurine arabinoside, which was found to be active against herpes simplex virus and vaccinia virus and with a lower toxicity than similar compounds. In her Nobel lecture, Gertrude Elion credits this finding with initiating her group's "antiviral odyssey," which would lead to the development of the HIV treatment AZT, the herpes treatment acyclovir, and other important antiretroviral compounds.

The promising results from diaminopurine arabinoside led Rideout to synthesize additional purine arabinosides, in hopes of developing more effective antivirals. She worked with a team including virologists J. Bauer and P. Collins to study their pharmacological properties, discovering that aminopurine arabinosides had antiviral activity that was dependent on their amino group. This knowledge helped lead to the design of more potent antiviral medications including acyclovir, the first active selective drug against herpes viruses.

=== AZT ===
Rideout also studied nucleosides' antibacterial properties. One of the compounds that interested her was azidothymidine (AZT), identical to the canonical nucleoside thymidine found in DNA except for the 3' position, where AZT has an azide (N3) group instead of a hydroxyl (OH) group. That 3' OH is needed for linking nucleotides together, so AZT could potentially act as a chain terminator (it could be added to a growing nucleic acid chain, but additional nucleotides couldn't link to it).

AZT was first synthesized in 1964 by a Michigan Cancer Foundation researcher, Jerome Horwitz, with hopes it could be used to treat leukemia, but it wasn't found to be effective and raised toxicity concerns so it was abandoned. There was limited research on it in the following years, including a report from a laboratory in showing it had activity against Friend virus, a murine virus that causes leukemia in mice, but retroviruses weren't thought to affect humans, and the paper drew little attention.

Rideout was interested in AZT's other potential applications; she studied AZT as an antibacterial agent at the Burroughs Wellcome Company for several years. The compound was particularly effective against gram-negative bacteria. In addition to chemical characterization and optimization of its synthesis, their research included pharmacokinetic and safety testing in rats. This experience, and the data they collected showing that the drug was tolerated in rats placed them in a prime position to expedite the drug development process.

In June 1984, Burroughs Wellcome initiated a program to identify chemical compounds that might be effective against HIV, and they put Rideout in charge of choosing which compounds to test. There was limited knowledge about HIV at the time, but Rideout's search was aided by the finding that HIV was a retrovirus, a type of virus that transfers between cells with its genome encoded in RNA but, once it infects a host cell, reverse transcribes its RNA genome into a DNA copy which it then inserts into the host cell's DNA, so that the cell and all its progeny are perpetually infected. Knowing that HIV was a retrovirus, Rideout searched for compounds with antiretroviral activity; the company didn't have the necessary set-up for studying live HIV, so they screened against animal retroviruses, with the screening carried out by virologist Martha (Marty) St. Clair.

One of the compounds Rideout chose to test was AZT and by the end of 1984, Wellcome had shown that AZT was active against two animal retroviruses, Harvey sarcoma virus and Friend leukemia virus. To see if it was also active against HIV, they collaborated with scientists at the National Cancer Institute (NCI), including Samuel Broder and Hiroaka Mitsuya, who had developed a method to grow the virus in immortalized human T4 cells (the type of immune cell HIV targets). NCI found AZT to be highly effective against HIV in these cells, and it went on to become the first FDA-approved treatment for HIV.

In 1985, Rideout, along with four other BW scientists, applied for American and British patents for the use of AZT, given the chemical name zidovudine and the proprietary name Retrovir, for the treatment of HIV-1; they were approved in 1988, with Rideout is listed as the first co-inventor.

Rideout's research on AZT didn't stop with its initial application to HIV. In the coming years at Burroughs Wellcome, she helped elucidate how AZT is processed in the body (administered as the cell membrane-permeable nucleoside, it is phosphorylated inside cells to the nucleotide form which is used in DNA synthesis) and how it selectively targets HIV's reverse transcriptase. She also continued to look into AZT's other potential uses, including against other viruses and bacteria.

=== Later career ===
In 1995, after working at Burroughs Wellcome for over 26 years, and rising to the rank of associate division director, Rideout joined Inspire Pharmaceuticals (acquired by Merck in 2011) as Director of Chemistry. She subsequently had a number of promotions within the company: to Senior Director of Discovery in June 1996, Vice President in January 1998, and Senior Vice President of Discovery in February 2000.

At Inspire Pharmaceuticals, she continued researching nucelosides but now as activators (agonists) instead of inhibitors. In addition to their role in the biosynthesis of nucleic acids, nucleotides can serve as important signaling molecules including through activating purinergic receptors. Rideout helped develop ways to synthesize a type of purinergic receptor agonist called dinucleoside polyphosphates (dinucleotides), which consist of two joined nucleosides with varying numbers of phosphate groups, so they can be further studied.

Rideout retired in September 2000.

Rideout holds over 40 U.S. patents. In addition to the patent for treating HIV with AZT, she holds patents for synthesis procedures of various nucleoside analogs as well as their specific therapeutic applications; this includes derivatives of AZT for use treating and preventing infection by certain retroviruses and gram-negative bacteria.

== Honors and awards ==
- Distinguished Chemist award, North Carolina Institute of Chemists, 1994
- Dean's Award, State University of New York, Buffalo, College of Arts and Science, 2012
- State University of New York, Buffalo Alumni Association, Distinguished Alumni Award, March 2014
- Life fellow and member of board of directors, American Institute of Chemists

== Selected publications ==
- Furman, P. A.; Fyfe, J. A.; Clair, M. H. St; Weinhold, K.; Rideout, J. L.; Freeman, G. A.; Lehrman, S. N.; Bolognesi, D. P.; Broder, S. (1986-11-01). "Phosphorylation of 3'-azido-3'-deoxythymidine and selective interaction of the 5'-triphosphate with human immunodeficiency virus reverse transcriptase". Proceedings of the National Academy of Sciences. 83 (21): 8333–8337. Bibcode:1986PNAS...83.8333F. doi:10.1073/pnas.83.21.8333. ISSN 0027-8424. PMC 386922. PMID 2430286.
- Elwell, L. P.; Ferone, R.; Freeman, G. A.; Fyfe, J. A.; Hill, J. A.; Ray, P. H.; Richards, C. A.; Singer, S. C.; Knick, V. B. (1987-02-01). "Antibacterial activity and mechanism of action of 3'-azido-3'-deoxythymidine (BW A509U)". Antimicrobial Agents and Chemotherapy. 31 (2): 274–280. doi:10.1128/AAC.31.2.274. ISSN 0066-4804. PMC 174705. PMID 3551832.
