= Tosato =

Tosato is an Italian surname. Notable people with the surname include:

- Egidio Tosato (1902–1984), Italian politician and drafter of the Italian Constitution
- Gian Luigi Tosato (born 1940), Italian jurist and lawyer
- Giovanna Tosato (born c. 1949), Italian physician-scientist and cancer researcher
- Mario Tosato (1930–1996), Italian racing cyclist
- Paolo Tosato (born 1972), Italian politician
