= Zalcitabine =

Chemical compound

Clinical data
- Pronunciation: /zælˈsɪtəˌbiːn/ zal-SIT-ə-been
- Trade names: Hivid (discontinued)
- AHFS/Drugs.com: Monograph
- Pregnancy category: AU: D
- Routes of administration: Oral
- ATC code: J05AF03 (WHO)

Legal status
- Legal status: UK: POM (Prescription only); US: ℞-only; In general: ℞ (Prescription only)

Pharmacokinetic data
- Bioavailability: >80%
- Protein binding: <4%
- Metabolism: Hepatic
- Elimination half-life: 2 hours
- Excretion: Renal (circa 80%)

Identifiers
- IUPAC name: 4-amino-1-((2R,5S)-5-(hydroxymethyl)tetrahydrofuran-2-yl)pyrimidin-2(1H)-one
- CAS Number: 7481-89-2
- PubChem CID: 24066
- IUPHAR/BPS: 4828
- DrugBank: DB00943
- ChemSpider: 22498
- UNII: 6L3XT8CB3I
- KEGG: D00412
- ChEBI: CHEBI:10101
- ChEMBL: ChEMBL853
- NIAID ChemDB: 000006
- CompTox Dashboard (EPA): DTXSID0023747
- ECHA InfoCard: 100.149.677

Chemical and physical data
- Formula: C_{9}H_{13}N_{3}O_{3}
- Molar mass: 211.221 g·mol^{−1}
- 3D model (JSmol): Interactive image
- SMILES: O=C1/N=C(/N)\C=C/N1[C@@H]2O[C@@H](CC2)CO
- InChI: InChI=1S/C9H13N3O3/c10-7-3-4-12(9(14)11-7)8-2-1-6(5-13)15-8/h3-4,6,8,13H,1-2,5H2,(H2,10,11,14)/t6-,8+/m0/s1; Key:WREGKURFCTUGRC-POYBYMJQSA-N

Zalcitabine (2′-3′-dideoxycytidine, ddC), also called dideoxycytidine, is a nucleoside analog reverse-transcriptase inhibitor (NRTI) sold under the trade name Hivid. Zalcitabine was the third antiretroviral to be approved by the Food and Drug Administration (FDA) for the treatment of HIV/AIDS. It is used as part of a combination regimen.

Zalcitabine appears less potent than some other nucleoside RTIs, has an inconvenient three-times daily frequency and is associated with serious adverse events. For these reasons it is now rarely used to treat human immunodeficiency virus (HIV), and it has even been removed from pharmacies entirely in some countries.

== Medical uses ==
Zalcitabine was the third antiretroviral to be approved by the Food and Drug Administration (FDA) for the treatment of HIV/AIDS. It was approved on June 19, 1992, as a monotherapy and again in 1996 for use in combination with zidovudine (AZT). Using combinations of NRTIs was in practice prior to the second FDA approval and the triple drug combinations with dual NRTIs and a protease inhibitor (PI) were not far off by this time.

In 1992 dideoxycytidine was listed as a specialty drug.

The sale and distribution of zalcitabine has been discontinued since December 31, 2006.

== Drug interactions ==
Lamivudine (3TC) significantly inhibits the intracellular phosphorylation of zalcitabine to the active form, and accordingly the drugs should not be administered together.

Additionally, zalcitabine should not be used with other drugs that can cause peripheral neuropathy, such as didanosine and stavudine.

== Adverse events ==
The most common adverse events at the beginning of treatment are nausea and headache. More serious adverse events are peripheral neuropathy, which can occur in up to 33% of patients with advanced disease, oral ulcers, oesophageal ulcers and, rarely, pancreatitis.

== Resistance ==
Resistance to zalcitabine develops infrequently compared with other nRTIs, and generally only occurs at a low level. The most common mutation observed in vivo is T69D, which does not appear to give rise to cross-resistance to other nRTIs; mutations at positions 65, 74, 75, 184 and 215 in the pol gene are observed more rarely.

== Pharmacology ==
=== Pharmacokinetics ===
Zalcitabine has a very high oral absorption rate of over 80%. It is predominantly eliminated by the renal route, with a half-life of 2 hours.

=== Mechanism of action ===
Zalcitabine is an analog of pyrimidine. It is a derivative of the naturally existing deoxycytidine, made by replacing the hydroxyl group in position 3' with a hydrogen.

It is phosphorylated in T cells and other HIV target cells into its active triphosphate form, ddCTP. This active metabolite works as a substrate for HIV reverse transcriptase, and also by incorporation into the viral DNA, hence terminating the chain elongation due to the missing hydroxyl group. Apart from inhibiting retroviral reverse transcriptase, ddC inhibits mitochondrial DNA polymerase gamma, resulting in a dose-limiting toxicity.

== History ==
Zalcitabine was first synthesized in the 1960s by Jerome Horwitz and subsequently developed as an anti-HIV agent by Samuel Broder, Hiroaki Mitsuya, and Robert Yarchoan at the National Cancer Institute (NCI). Like didanosine, it was then licensed because the NCI may not market or sell drugs. The National Institutes of Health (NIH) thus licensed it to Hoffmann-La Roche.
