= C11H15N5O5 =

The molecular formula C_{11}H_{15}N_{5}O_{5} (molar mass: 298.28 g/mol) may refer to:

- 7-Methylguanosine
- Nelarabine
