= Gertrude B. Elion =

American biochemist and pharmacologist (1918–1999)

Gertrude Elion ForMemRS
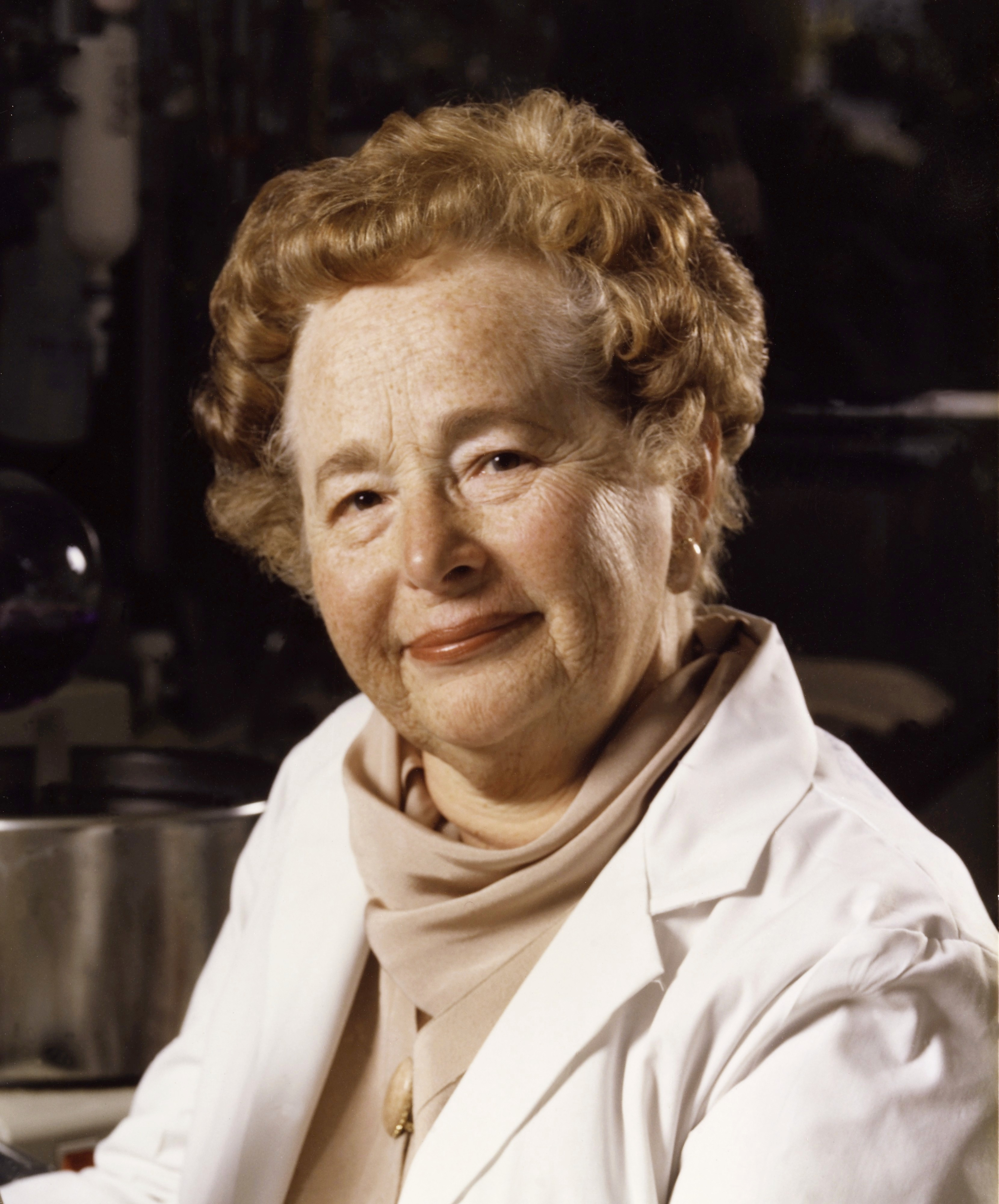
- Elion in 1983
- Born: Gertrude Belle Elion; January 23, 1918; New York City, U.S.
- Died: February 21, 1999 (aged 81); Chapel Hill, North Carolina, U.S
- Education: Hunter College; New York University
- Awards: Garvan-Olin Medal (1968); Nobel Prize in Physiology or Medicine (1988); National Medal of Science (1991); Lemelson-MIT Prize (1997); National Inventors Hall of Fame (1991)
- Scientific career
- Workplaces: Burroughs Wellcome; Duke University
- Website: www.nobelprize.org/nobel_prizes/medicine/laureates/1988/elion-bio.html

Signature
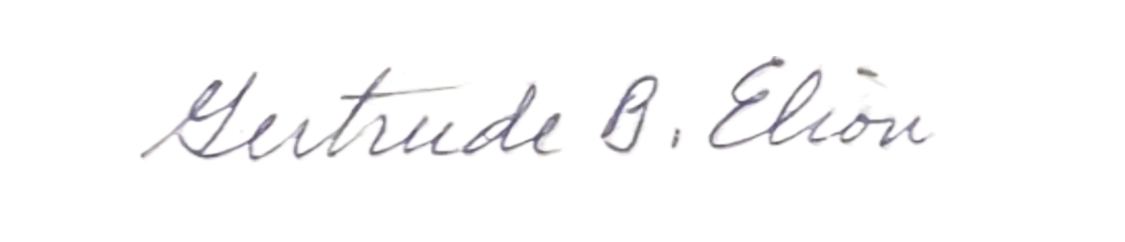

Gertrude "Trudy" Belle Elion (January 23, 1918 – February 21, 1999) was an American biochemist and pharmacologist, who shared the 1988 Nobel Prize in Physiology or Medicine with George H. Hitchings and Sir James Black for their use of innovative methods of rational drug design for the development of new drugs. This new method focused on understanding the target of the drug rather than simply using trial-and-error. Her work led to the creation of the anti-retroviral drug AZT, which was the first drug widely used against AIDS. Her well known works also include the development of the first immunosuppressive drug, azathioprine, used to fight rejection in organ transplants, and the first successful antiviral drug, acyclovir (ACV), used in the treatment of herpes infection.

== Early life and education ==
Elion was born in New York City on January 23, 1918, to parents Robert Elion, a Lithuanian Jewish immigrant and a dentist, and Bertha Cohen, a Polish Jewish immigrant. Her family lost their wealth after the Wall Street Crash of 1929. Elion was an excellent student who graduated from Walton High School at the age of 15. When she was 15, her grandfather died of stomach cancer, and being with him during his last moments inspired Elion to pursue a career in science and medicine in college. She was Phi Beta Kappa at Hunter College, which she was able to attend for free due to her grades, graduating summa cum laude in 1937 with a degree in chemistry. Unable to find a paying research job after graduating because she was a woman, Elion worked as a secretary and high school teacher before working in an unpaid position at a chemistry lab. Eventually, she saved up enough money to attend New York University and she earned her M.Sc. in 1941, while working as a high school teacher during the day. In an interview after receiving her Nobel Prize, she stated that she believed the sole reason she was able to further her education as a young woman was because she was able to attend Hunter College for free. Her fifteen financial aid applications for graduate school were turned down due to gender bias, so she enrolled in a secretarial school, where she attended only six weeks before she found a job.

Unable to obtain a graduate research position, she worked as a food quality supervisor at A&P supermarkets and for a food lab in New York, testing the acidity of pickles and the color of egg yolk going into mayonnaise. She moved to a position at Johnson & Johnson that she hoped would be more promising, but ultimately involved testing the strength of sutures. In 1944, she left to work as an assistant to George H. Hitchings at the Burroughs-Wellcome pharmaceutical company (now GlaxoSmithKline) in Tuckahoe, New York. Hitchings was using a new way of developing drugs, by intentionally imitating natural compounds instead of through trial and error. Specifically, he was interested in synthesizing antagonists to nucleic acid derivatives, with the goal that these antagonists would integrate into biological pathways. He believed that if he could trick cancer cells into accepting artificial compounds for their growth, they could be destroyed without also destroying normal cells.Elion synthesized anti-metabolites of purines, and in 1950, she developed the anti-cancer drugs tioguanine and mercaptopurine.

She pursued graduate studies at night school at New York University Tandon School of Engineering (then Brooklyn Polytechnic Institute), but after several years of long-range commuting, she was informed that she would no longer be able to continue her doctorate on a part-time basis, but would need to give up her job and go to school full-time. Elion made a critical decision in her life, and stayed with her job and give up the pursuit of her doctorate. She never obtained a formal Ph.D., but was later awarded an honorary Ph.D. from New York University Tandon School of Engineering (then Polytechnic University of New York) in 1989 and an honorary S.D. degree from Harvard University in 1998.

== Personal life ==
Soon after graduating from Hunter College, Elion met Leonard Canter, a statistics student at City College of New York (CCNY). They planned to marry, but Canter became ill. On June 25, 1941, he died from bacterial endocarditis, an infection of his heart valves. In her Nobel interview, she stated that this furthered her drive to become a research scientist and pharmacologist.

Elion never married or had children. She listed her hobbies as photography, travel, opera and ballet, and listening to music. After Burroughs Wellcome moved to Research Triangle Park in North Carolina, Elion moved to nearby Chapel Hill. She retired in 1983 from Burroughs Wellcome to spend more time traveling and attending the opera. She continued to make important scientific contributions after her retirement. One of her passions during this time was encouraging other women to pursue careers in science.

Elion died in North Carolina in 1999, aged 81.

== Career and research ==
While Elion had many jobs to support herself and put herself through school, she had also worked for the National Cancer Institute, American Association for Cancer Research, and World Health Organization, among other organizations. From 1967 to 1983, she was the head of the department of experimental therapy for Burroughs Wellcome. She officially retired from Burroughs and Wellcome in 1983.

She was affiliated with Duke University as adjunct professor of pharmacology and of experimental medicine from 1971 to 1983 and research professor from 1983 to 1999. During her time at Duke, she focused on mentoring medical and graduate students. She published more than 25 papers with the students she mentored at Duke.

Even after her retirement from Burroughs Wellcome, Gertrude continued almost full-time work at the lab. She played a significant role in the development of AZT, one of the first drugs used to treat HIV and AIDS. She also was crucial in the development of nelarabine, which she worked on until her death in 1999.

Rather than relying on trial and error, Elion and Hitchings discovered new drugs using rational drug design, which used the differences in biochemistry and metabolism between normal human cells and pathogens (disease-causing agents such as cancer cells, protozoa, bacteria, and viruses) to design drugs that could kill or inhibit the reproduction of particular pathogens without harming human cells. The drugs they developed are used to treat a variety of maladies, such as leukemia, malaria, lupus, hepatitis, arthritis, gout, organ transplant rejection (azathioprine), as well as herpes (acyclovir, which was the first selective and effective drug of its kind). Most of Elion's early work came from the use and development of purine derivatives. Elion's research contributed to the development of:

- Mercaptopurine (Purinethol), the first treatment for leukemia, also used in organ transplantation.
- Azathioprine (Imuran), the first immuno-suppressive agent, used for organ transplants.
- Allopurinol (Zyloprim), for gout.
- Pyrimethamine (Daraprim), for malaria.
- Trimethoprim (Proloprim, Monoprim, others), for meningitis, sepsis, and bacterial infections of the urinary and respiratory tracts.
- Acyclovir (Zovirax), for viral herpes.
- Nelarabine for cancer treatment.

== Selected works by Gertrude B. Elion ==
- Elion GB; Hitchins GH; Vanderwerff H (1951). "Antagonists of Nucleic Acid Derivatives. VI. Purines" (PDF). Journal of Biological Chemistry. 192 (2): 505–518. doi:10.1016/S0021-9258(19)77771-0. PMID 14907641.
- "Interaction of Anticancer Drugs with Enzymes." In Pharmacological Basis of Cancer Chemotherapy (1975).
- Elion, G. (1989). "The Purine Path to Chemotherapy". Science. 244 (4900): 41–47. Bibcode:1989Sci...244...41E. doi:10.1126/science.2649979. PMID 2649979.
- Elion, G. B.; Furman, P. A.; Fyfe, J. A.; Miranda, P. d.; Beauchamp, L.; Schaeffer, H. J. (1977). "Selectivity of Action of an Antiherpetic Agent, 9-(2-hydroxyethoxymethyl) guanine". Proceedings of the National Academy of Sciences. 74 (12): 5716–5720. Bibcode:1977PNAS...74.5716E. doi:10.1073/pnas.74.12.5716. PMC 431864. PMID 202961.
- Elion, Gertrude B.; Hitchings, George H. (1955). "The Synthesis of 6-Thioguanine". Journal of the American Chemical Society. 77 (6): 1676. Bibcode:1955JAChS..77.1676E. doi:10.1021/ja01611a082.

== Awards and honors ==
In 1988 Elion received the Nobel Prize in Physiology or Medicine, together with Hitchings and Sir James Black for discoveries of "important new principles of drug treatment". Elion was the fifth woman Nobel laureate in Medicine and the ninth in science in general, and one of only a handful of laureates without a doctoral degree. She was the only woman honored with a Nobel Prize that year. She was elected a member of the National Academy of Sciences in 1990, a member of the Institute of Medicine in 1991 and a Fellow of the American Academy of Arts and Sciences also in 1991.

Her awards include the Garvan-Olin Medal (1968), the Sloan-Kettering Institute Judd Award (1983), the American Chemical Society Distinguished Chemist Award (1985), the American Academy of Achievement's Golden Plate Award (1989), the American Association for Cancer Research Cain Award (1985), the American Cancer Society Medal of Honor (1990), the National Medal of Science (1991), and the Lemelson-MIT Lifetime Achievement Award (1997). In 1991 Elion became the first woman to be inducted into the National Inventors Hall of Fame. She was inducted into the National Women's Hall of Fame also in 1991. In 1992, she was elected to the Engineering and Science Hall of Fame. She was elected a Foreign Member of the Royal Society (ForMemRS) in 1995.

== See also ==
- Timeline of women in science
- List of Jewish Nobel laureates
