= Elizabeth Jaffee =

American oncologist

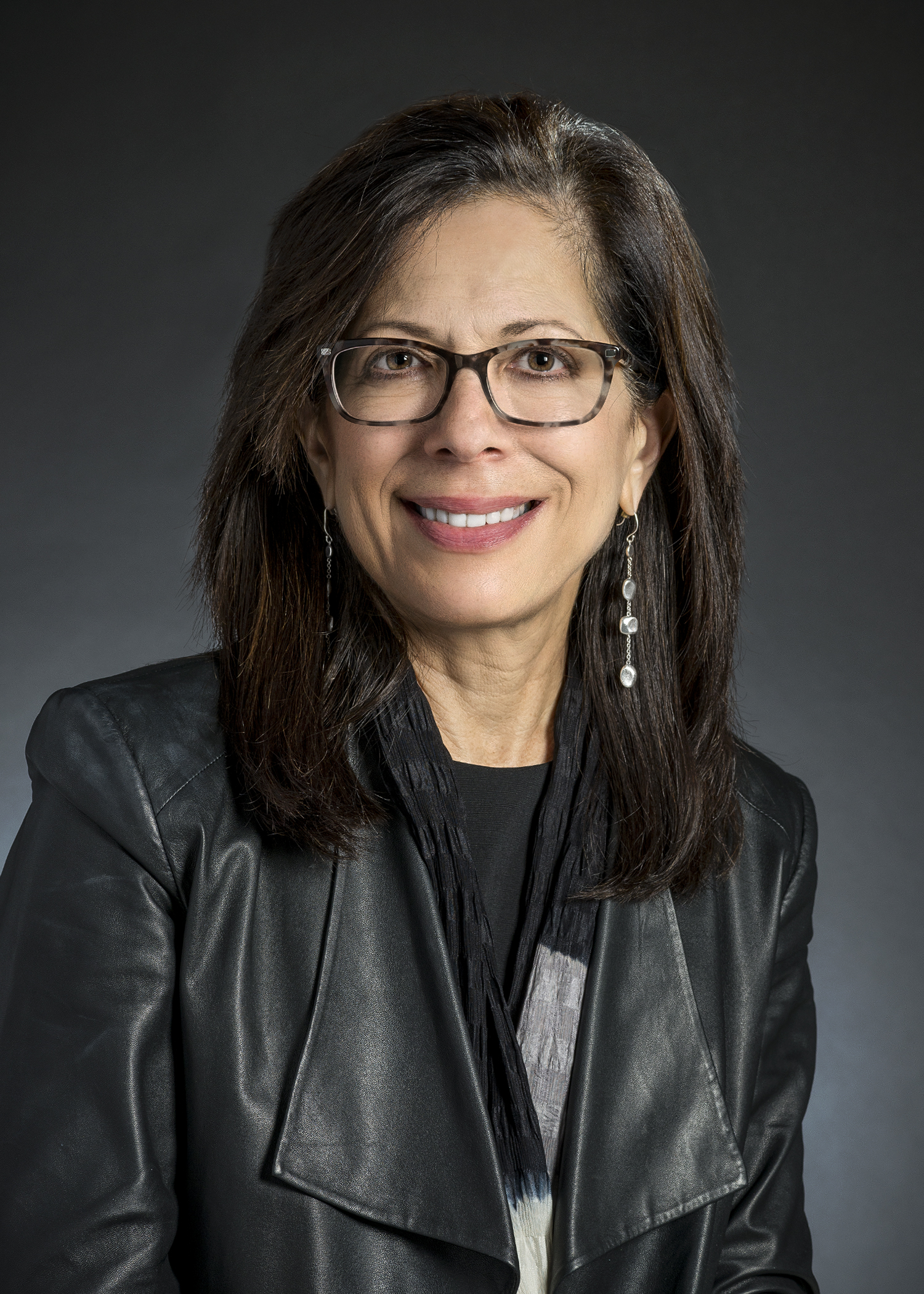
- Born: New York City, U.S.
- Education: Brandeis University, BSc. New York Medical College, M.D.
- Known for: Pancreatic Cancer
- Scientific career
- Fields: Oncology, Immunology, Pathology
- Workplaces: Presbyterian-University Hospital, Medical Resident Johns Hopkins School of Medicine, Professor of Oncology American Association for Cancer Research, President-Elect; Sidney Kimmel Comprehensive Cancer Center, Deputy Director; Institute of Clinical and Translational Research, Deputy Director

Elizabeth M. Jaffee is an American oncologist specializing in pancreatic cancer and immunotherapy.

== Early life ==
Jaffee was born in Brooklyn, New York, and her family moved to the neighborhood of Canarsie shortly after. When she was in middle school, the family moved to Huntington on Long Island.

== Education ==
Jaffee completed her undergraduate degree at Brandeis University in 1981, becoming the first woman in her family to have graduated from college, and earned her MD from New York Medical College in 1985. Following medical school, she did her residency at Presbyterian-University Hospital in Pittsburgh, Pennsylvania. After residency she received a position as a research fellow at the University of Pittsburgh.

== Career ==
In 1989, Jaffee started at Johns Hopkins University as a Senior Clinical Oncology Fellow and then went on to become the Assistant Professor of Oncology in 1992. Jaffee works as a medical researcher and deputy director at Johns Hopkins Sidney Kimmel Comprehensive Cancer Center in Baltimore, Maryland. In addition, she is the deputy director of the Institute of Clinical and Translational Research as well as an oncology professor at Johns Hopkins School of Medicine. She is the co-director of the Cancer Immunology Program, the Gastrointestinal Cancers Program, and Skip Viragh Center for Pancreas Cancer Clinical Research and Patient Care.

Jaffee takes part in numerous leadership positions. She served as president of the American Association for Cancer Research from 2018 to 2019. In 2019, she was appointed Chief Medical Advisor of the Lustgarten Foundation—the largest private-funder of pancreatic cancer research worldwide. Jaffee also serves as Director of the Foundation's Clinical Accelerator Initiative (CAI), which is designed to quickly move research from the lab to the clinic. She is also involved in the American Society for the Advancement of Science, the American Society of Clinical Oncology, the American Association of Immunologists, the Society of Immunotherapy for Cancer, the Scientific Advisory Board of the Abramson Cancer Center at the University of Philadelphia, the External Advisory Boards of both the Seattle Cancer Consortium Breast SPORE and the University of Pittsburgh Cancer Institute Head and Neck Cancer SPORE, and the Board of Directors of Break Through Cancer since 2021.

Jaffee is the deputy director of the Sidney Kimmel Comprehensive Cancer Center, co-director at the Skip Viragh Center for Pancreas Cancer, deputy director of the Institute of Clinical and Translational Research, and professor of oncology and pathology at Johns Hopkins School of Medicine. Her research is focused on immunological treatments for cancer.

In 2024, she co-founded Adventris Pharmaceuticals with Dr. Mark Yarchoan focused on the development of therapeutic cancer vaccines.

Jaffee is the chair of the National Cancer Advisory Board for the National Cancer Institute, of which she has been a member since 2013, and co-chair of the NCI "Blue Ribbon Panel" for the National Cancer Moonshot Initiative. She is a leader of the Stand Up to Cancer Dream Team for pancreatic cancer.

== Research ==
Jaffee’s career is mostly focused on pancreatic cancer treatments. Her main point of interest is using immune therapies to help combat tolerance to cancers. These include utilizing treatments like novel immune checkpoint inhibitors and cancer vaccines. Jaffee is a major leader in cancer vaccine therapy. According to the Boston Globe, Jaffee led a clinical trial on a vaccine, GVAX, that targets pancreatic tumors. With 3 out of the 14 patients in remission, Dr. Jaffee sees a lot of potential in this treatment style for the future. The vaccines would train the body’s immune cells to combat the cancer cells. If the vaccine is successful within a patient, it would prolong their life and prevent the pancreatic cancer from reoccurring for longer periods of time, therefore offering longer remission and a healthier lifestyle for the cancer patient. Furthermore, Jaffee holds 6 vaccine patents, some of which include: Diagnostic Biomarkers and Therapeutic Targets For Pancreatic Cancer, Mesothelin Vaccines and Model Systems, Annexina2 as Immunological Target, and Prostate Stem Cell Antigen Vaccines and Uses Thereof. In 2007, Dr. Elizabeth Jaffee co-authored “Cancer Immunotherapy: Immune Suppression and Tumor Growth”, a publication describing the current understanding of the immune system and its connection between the progression of cancer in the body.

Additionally, Dr. Jaffee has aided in many research discoveries for pancreatic cancer. For instance, genomic and proteomic methods were established to see new signs of pancreatic cancer progression. With further research and development, Jaffee has hopes to make the protein, Annexin A2, not as overworked to prevent the advancement of pancreatic cancer in the body. Throughout her career, Dr. Jaffee has received numerous awards and achievements for her work and effort contributing to cancer research and treatment. Jaffee was the first ever recipient of the Dana and Albert “Cubby” Broccoli Professorship in Oncology at the Sidney Kimmel Comprehensive Cancer Center at Johns Hopkins. To continue, she is involved with many institutions including the National Cancer Advisory Board, the NCI NExT SEP Committee, the AACR Cancer Immunology Working Group (CIMM) Steering Committee, the Cancer Vaccine Collaborative (CVC). In 2010 and 2012, Jaffee worked closely as a co-organizer for the AACR Special Conference on Cancer Immunology. Currently, she hopes to incorporate technology, big data, and mathematics into the treatments of pancreatic cancer.

== Awards and honors ==
- 2006 – Spore Program Investigator of the Year from the NCI
- 2012 – Johns Hopkins University Office of Women in Science and Medicine Vice Dean's Award
- 2015 – AACR Joseph H. Burchenal Memorial Award for Outstanding Achievement in Clinical Cancer Research
- 2019 - Cancer Research Institute William B. Coley Award for Distinguished Research in Tumor Immunology
- 2019 - Nominated to the National Academy of Medicine.
