= Jerome Horwitz =

American scientist (1919–2012)

Jerome Phillip Horwitz (January 16, 1919 – September 6, 2012) was an American scientist; his affiliations included the Barbara Ann Karmanos Cancer Institute, the Wayne State University School of Medicine and the Michigan Cancer Foundation.

== Background ==
Horwitz was a Jewish Detroit native and 1937 graduate of Central High School.

He earned his bachelor's and master's degrees in chemistry from the University of Detroit; his doctorate in chemistry came from the University of Michigan. He completed his post-doctoral training at Northwestern University and the University of Michigan

== Clinical breakthroughs ==
In 1964, while conducting research for the Michigan Cancer Foundation, Horwitz synthesized a compound that was to become known as zidovudine (AZT) - an antiviral drug used to treat HIV patients; Zidovudine was initially developed as a treatment for cancer. Horwitz was also first to synthesize stavudine (d4T) and zalcitabine (ddC) - two other reverse-transcriptase inhibitors used in the treatment of HIV patients.

Also during 1964, he published the first production and demonstration of X-gal as a chromogenic substrate.

After synthesizing AZT, Horwitz went on to create many successful treatments for cancer and other diseases. At the time of his most recent findings, Horwitz was working for the Michigan Cancer Foundation with a federal grant from the National Institutes of Health; he retired in 2005.

== Of further note ==
- Horwitz was featured in the documentary film I am alive today - History of an AIDS drug.
- While some believe Horwitz was referenced in the Captain Underpants books, the Jerome Horwitz Elementary School in the children's book series was in fact named after Curly Howard from the Three Stooges. (Jerome Horwitz was Curly's given name.)

== Sources ==
- FDA press release on AZT
- Karmanos Cancer Institute formerly Michigan Cancer Foundation
