= Mark Yarchoan =

Mark Yarchoan is an American medical oncologist and physician-scientist whose research focuses on cancer immunotherapy for gastrointestinal malignancies. His research has included studies of biomarkers of responses to immunotherapy and the development of therapeutic cancer vaccines for liver cancers.

== Education and training ==
Yarchoan received his undergraduate degree from Amherst College and his medical degree from the Perelman School of Medicine at the University of Pennsylvania. He completed residency in internal medicine at the Hospital of the University of Pennsylvania and fellowship training in medical oncology at the Johns Hopkins School of Medicine, where he completed postdoctoral research training with Dr. Elizabeth Jaffee before joining the faculty.

== Career ==
At Johns Hopkins, Yarchoan specializes in research for gastrointestinal cancers, with a focus on hepatobiliary malignancies including hepatocellular carcinoma, cholangiocarcinoma, and fibrolamellar carcinoma. His laboratory studies mechanisms of immune response and immune resistance in cancer and develops immunotherapy strategies, including neoantigen-targeted therapeutic vaccines. Yarchoan is a co-founder of Adventris Pharmaceuticals.

== Research ==
Yarchoan's research has focused on improving immunotherapy for liver cancers and other gastrointestinal cancers. His early work included studies of tumor mutational burden and other biomarkers of response to immune checkpoint inhibitors, and dissecting the mechanisms of response, resistance, and toxicity from immunotherapy. Yarchoan investigated the use of neoadjuvant immunotherapy for localized hepatocellular carcinoma and examined immune responses in tumors responding to treatment. He also co-led the development of treatment guidelines for HCC which support the use of immunotherapy more broadly across liver cancer stages, including as part of multimodality therapy.

Another focus of his laboratory research includes the study of neoantigen-targeted immunity, including therapeutic cancer vaccines and T cell receptor therapies. He investigated the use of personalized cancer vaccines targeting tumor neoantigens for hepatocellular carcinoma. Yarchoan also studied therapeutic cancer vaccines for fibrolamellar carcinoma, a rare liver cancer affecting children and young adults. In 2025, his group led the development of a cancer vaccine targeting the DNAJ-PKAc fusion neoantigen that is present for most patients with this cancer type.

== Honors ==
Yarchoan has received several research awards, including the ASCO Young Investigator Award and Career Development Award.

In 2026, he was elected to the American Society for Clinical Investigation.
