= Samuel Broder =

American medical researcher

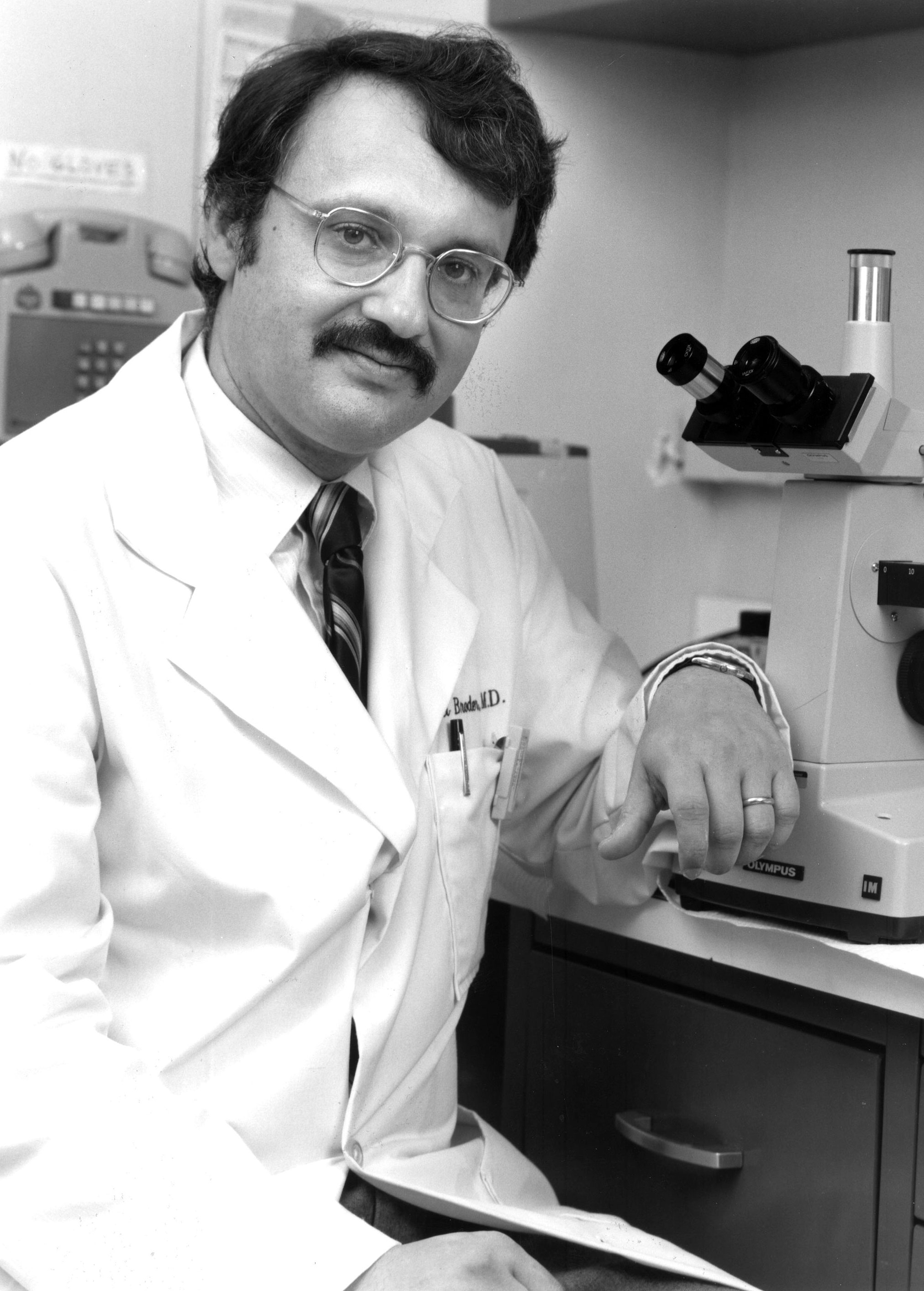
- Samuel Broder (1986)
- Born: 24 February 1945 (age 81); Detroit, Michigan
- Allegiance: United States
- Service: U.S. Public Health Service Commissioned Corps
- Rank: Rear admiral

Samuel Broder (born in 1945) is an American oncologist and medical researcher. He was a co-developer of some of the first effective drugs for the treatment of AIDS and was Director of the National Cancer Institute (NCI) from 1989 to 1995.

During the first years of the AIDS epidemic, he co-developed zidovudine (AZT), didanosine (ddI), and zalcitabine (ddC), which were the first effective drugs licensed for the treatment of AIDS. In 1989, he was appointed by President Ronald Reagan to be Director of the NCI. In this position he oversaw the development of a number of new therapies for cancer including paclitaxel (Taxol). After leaving the NCI, Dr. Broder became Senior Vice President for Research and Development at the IVAX Corporation in Florida, a position he held until 1998 when he joined Celera Genomics. He is now Chief Medical Officer of Celera.

He has received a number of honors for his work including the Arthur S. Flemming Award and the Leopold Griffuel Prize.
