= Hiroaki Mitsuya =

Japanese virologist

Hiroaki Mitsuya (満屋 裕明, Mitsuya Hiroaki; born 1950) is a Japanese virologist famous for his role in discovery of the anti-HIV drug zidovudine (AZT) as well as other anti-AIDS drugs including didanosine (ddI) and zalcitabine (ddC).

Mitsuya was born in Sasebo, Nagasaki and received his M.D. and Ph.D. from Kumamoto University. He joined the American National Cancer Institute in Bethesda, Maryland, in 1982, working initially on Human T-lymphotropic virus 1 before switching his attention to HIV. His identification of AZT as an anti-HIV drug, as well as the anti-HIV properties of didanosine and zalcitabine, was made in 1985. He was appointed Professor of Hematology, Rheumatology and Clinical Immunology at Kumamoto University Graduate School of Medical And Pharmaceutical Sciences.

In December, 2006, he was awarded the first NIH World AIDS Day Award for his work in developing drugs for AIDS. Mitsuya has been chief of the NCI's Experimental Retrovirology Section since 1991.

== Awards and honors ==
- 2006: NIH World AIDS Day Award
- 2007: Takamine Memorial Daiichi Sankyo Prize
- 2007: Medal of Purple ribbon
- 2007: Keio Medical Science Prize
- 2014: Yomiuri International Cooperation Award
- 2015: Asahi Prize
- 2015: Japan Academy Prize (academics)
- 2023: Order of the Sacred Treasure
- 2025: Person of Cultural Merit

== References and Links ==
- Page describing Dr. Mitsuya's research on NCI website
- Yarchoan R, Mitsuya H, Broder S. AIDS therapies. Scientific American 1988;259(4):110-9
