= Nelarabine =

Chemical compound

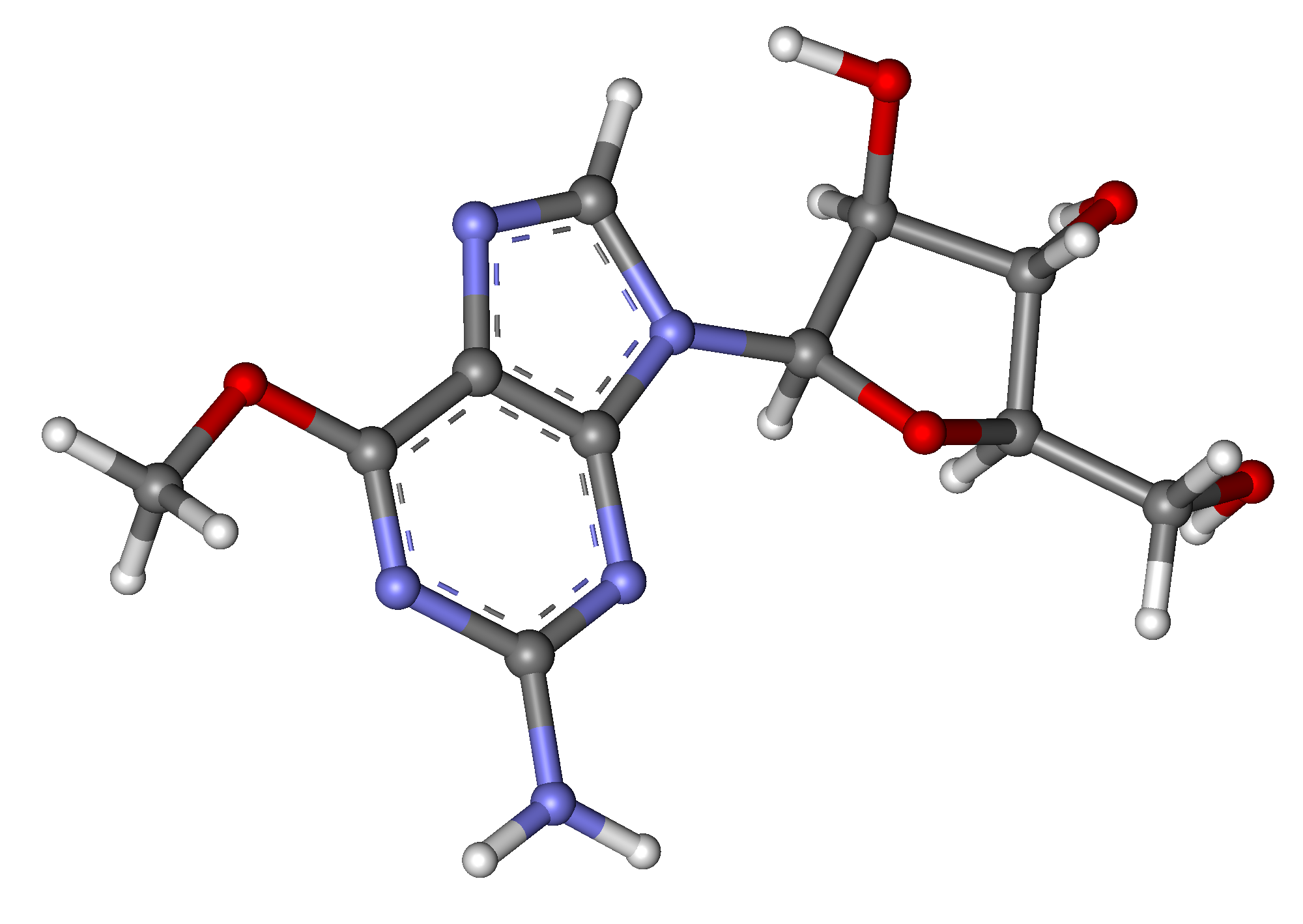

Clinical data
- Trade names: Arranon, Atriance
- Other names: 506U78
- AHFS/Drugs.com: Monograph
- MedlinePlus: a607077
- License data: US DailyMed: Nelarabine
- Pregnancy category: AU: D
- Routes of administration: Intravenous
- ATC code: L01BB07 (WHO)

Legal status
- Legal status: AU: S4 (Prescription only); US: ℞-only; EU: Rx-only

Pharmacokinetic data
- Bioavailability: n/a
- Protein binding: <25%
- Metabolism: By adenosine deaminase, to 9-β-D-arabinofuranosylguanine
- Elimination half-life: 30 minutes (nelarabine); 3 hours (ara-G)
- Excretion: Kidney

Identifiers
- CAS Number: 121032-29-9
- PubChem CID: 3011155
- IUPHAR/BPS: 7090
- DrugBank: DB01280
- ChemSpider: 2280207
- UNII: 60158CV180
- KEGG: D05134
- ChEMBL: ChEMBL1201112
- CompTox Dashboard (EPA): DTXSID6046842
- ECHA InfoCard: 100.170.768

Chemical and physical data
- Formula: C_{11}H_{15}N_{5}O_{5}
- Molar mass: 297.271 g·mol^{−1}
- 3D model (JSmol): Interactive image
- SMILES: n2c1c(nc(nc1OC)N)n(c2)[C@@H]3O[C@@H]([C@@H](O)[C@@H]3O)CO
- InChI: InChI=1S/C11H15N5O5/c1-20-9-5-8(14-11(12)15-9)16(3-13-5)10-7(19)6(18)4(2-17)21-10/h3-4,6-7,10,17-19H,2H2,1H3,(H2,12,14,15)/t4-,6-,7+,10-/m1/s1; Key:IXOXBSCIXZEQEQ-UHTZMRCNSA-N

Nelarabine, sold under the brand names Arranon (US) and Atriance (EU), is a chemotherapy medication used for the treatment of T-cell acute lymphoblastic leukemia (T-ALL) and T-cell lymphoblastic lymphoma (T-LBL).

Nelarabine is a prodrug of arabinosylguanine nucleotide triphosphate (araGTP), a type of purine nucleoside analog, which causes inhibition of DNA synthesis and cytotoxicity. Pre-clinical studies suggest that T-cells are particularly sensitive to nelarabine. In October 2005, it was approved by the FDA for acute lymphoblastic leukemia and T-cell lymphoblastic lymphoma that has not responded to or has relapsed following treatment with at least two chemotherapy regimens. It was later approved in the European Union in October 2005. It is available as a generic medication.
