= Giovanna Tosato =

Italian physician-scientist

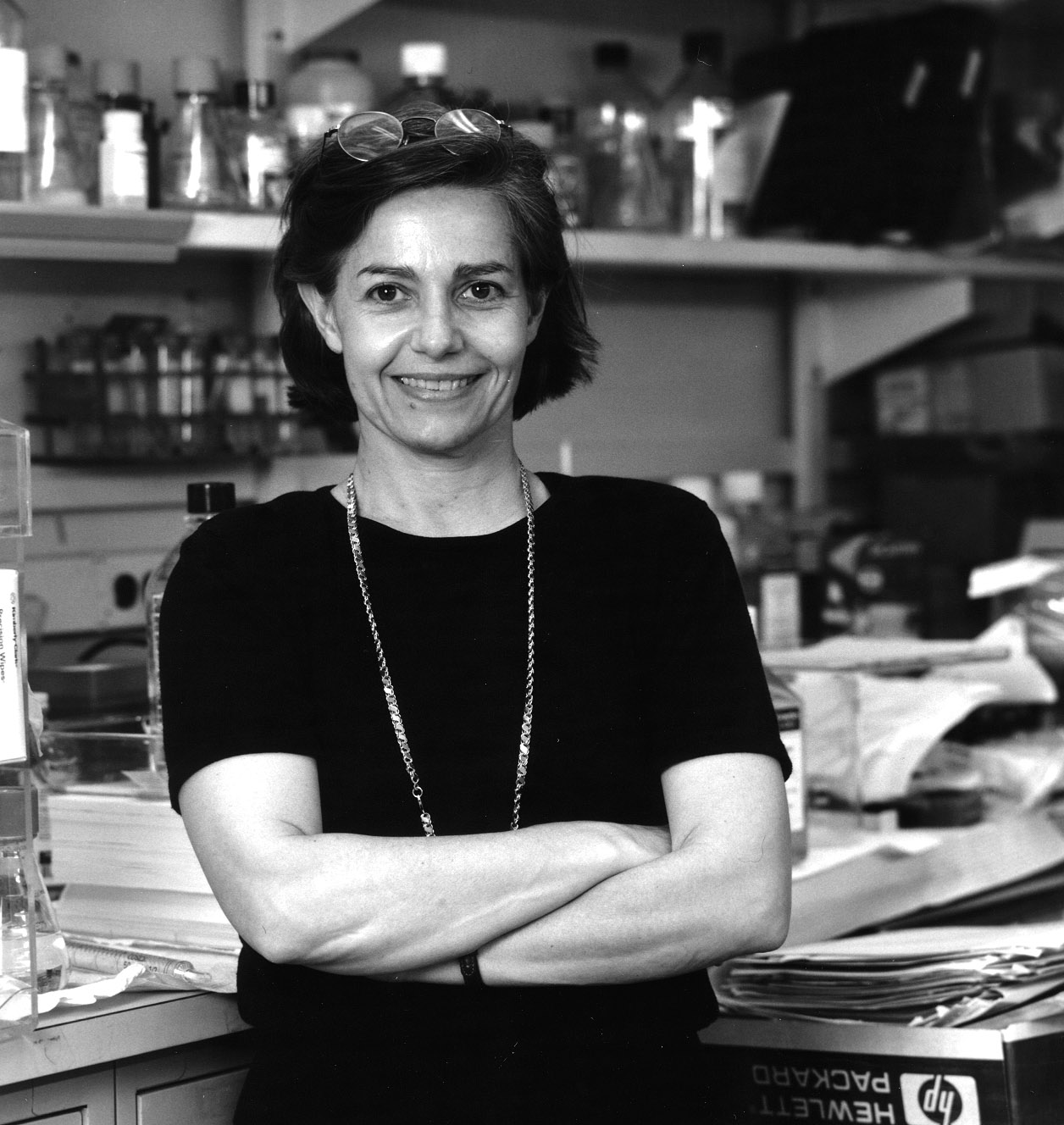
- Tosato in April 2000
- Born: c. 1949 (age 76–77)
- Education: Sapienza University of Rome
- Scientific career
- Fields: Biomedical science, cancer research
- Workplaces: Food and Drug Administration; National Cancer Institute

Giovanna Tosato (born c. 1949) is an Italian–American physician-scientist and cancer researcher investigating the endothelium, angiogenesis, and the hematopoietic stem cell niche. She heads the molecular and cell biology section in the laboratory of cellular oncology at the National Cancer Institute in the United States. Tosato was a division director in the Center for Biologics Evaluation and Research from 1992 to 1999.

== Education ==
Tosato was born c. 1949. She earned an M.D. at the Sapienza University of Rome in 1973. She completed a residency at the Catholic University in Rome. In 1976, she moved to the National Cancer Institute (NCI) in the United States where she became a clinical associate in the pediatric and medicine branches and subsequently a visiting fellow in the metabolism branch. In 1982, work performed by Tosato, Alfred Steinberg, and Michael Blaese showed an association between a particular viral infection and rheumatoid arthritis.

== Career and research ==
In 1983, Tosato began working at the United States Food and Drug Administration (FDA). From 1992 to 1999 she served as director of the Center for Biologics Evaluation and Research's division of hematologic products, center for biologics evaluation and research. In 1999, Tosato returned to the NCI as a senior investigator. As of 2021, she heads the molecular and cell biology section in the laboratory of cellular oncology at the National Cancer Institute.

Tosato's laboratory focuses on the study of the endothelium in the context of cancer development and progression. She studies angiogenesis and vessel survival as these processes are essential for tumor growth. Her laboratory investigates the endothelium as a component of the hematopoietic cell niche. This research is used to develop targeted therapies for cancer and other conditions in which the endothelium plays a functional role.

== Personal life ==
At the age of 64, Tosato completed the 2013 Boston Marathon in 3 hours and 57 minutes. She was between 50 and 100 yards past the finish line when the Boston Marathon bombing started.

== Selected works ==
- Tosato, G; Jones, Kd (March 1990). "Interleukin-1 induces interleukin-6 production in peripheral blood monocytes". Blood. 75 (6): 1305–1310. doi:10.1182/blood.V75.6.1305.1305. ISSN 0006-4971. PMID 2310829.
- Taga, K; Mostowski, H; Tosato, G (June 1993). "Human interleukin-10 can directly inhibit T-cell growth". Blood. 81 (11): 2964–2971. doi:10.1182/blood.V81.11.2964.2964. ISSN 0006-4971. PMID 8499633.
- Angiolillo, A L; Sgadari, C; Taub, D D; Liao, F; Farber, J M; Maheshwari, S; Kleinman, H K; Reaman, G H; Tosato, G (July 1995). "Human interferon-inducible protein 10 is a potent inhibitor of angiogenesis in vivo". Journal of Experimental Medicine. 182 (1): 155–162. doi:10.1084/jem.182.1.155. ISSN 0022-1007. PMC 2192108. PMID 7540647.
- Sgadari, C; Angiolillo, Al; Tosato, G (May 1996). "Inhibition of angiogenesis by interleukin-12 is mediated by the interferon-inducible protein 10". Blood. 87 (9): 3877–3882. doi:10.1182/blood.V87.9.3877.bloodjournal8793877. ISSN 0006-4971. PMID 8611715.
