= George Q. Daley =

Medical academic

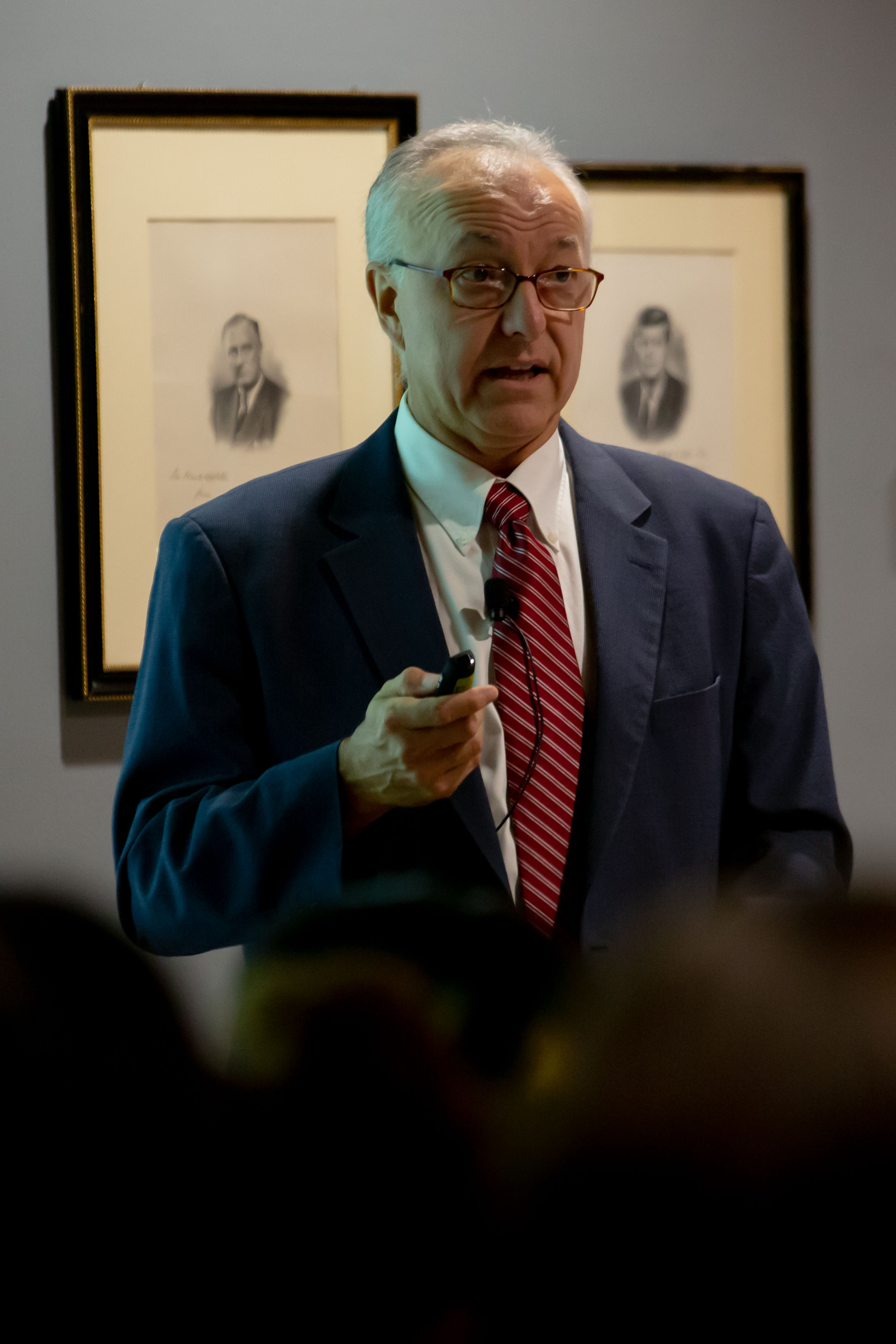
- Daley at the Edmond J. Safra Center for Ethics in 2019
- Born: Catskill, New York, U.S.
- Education: Harvard University (BA, MD); Massachusetts Institute of Technology (PhD)
- Spouse: Amy Edmondson

George Quentin Daley is an American biologist and physician. He is the Dean of the Faculty of Medicine, Caroline Shields Walker Professor of Medicine, and Professor of Biological Chemistry and Molecular Pharmacology at Harvard Medical School. He was formerly the Samuel E. Lux IV Endowed Chair in Hematology/Oncology at Boston Children’s Hospital, later the Robert A. Stranahan Professor of Pediatrics at Harvard Medical School, Director of the Pediatric Stem Cell Transplantation Program at the Dana-Farber/Boston Children's Cancer and Blood Disorders Center, an investigator of the Howard Hughes Medical Institute, Associate Director of the Boston Children's Hospital Stem Cell Program, and a member of the executive committee of the Harvard Stem Cell Institute. He is a past president of the International Society for Stem Cell Research (2007–2008). In 2026, he was elected to the American Philosophical Society.

Daley has faced accusations of falsifying research data. In 2018, Daley was forced to retract a Nature Cell Biology paper after it was discovered that his lab had falsified data .

== Early life and education ==
Daley was born in Catskill, New York. He received his Bachelor of Arts, magna cum laude, from Harvard College (1982), his Ph.D. in biology from the Massachusetts Institute of Technology (1989), and his M.D. from Harvard Medical School, where he was the tenth individual in the school's history to be awarded the degree summa cum laude (1991). He served as Chief Resident in Internal Medicine at the Massachusetts General Hospital and is currently a staff physician in Hematology/Oncology at Boston Children's Hospital and Dana–Farber Cancer Institute.

== Research ==
As a graduate student working with Nobelist David Baltimore, Daley demonstrated that the BCR/ABL oncogene induces chronic myeloid leukemia (CML) in a mouse model, which validated BCR/ABL as a target for drug blockade and encouraged the development of imatinib (Gleevec; Novartis), a magic-bullet chemotherapy that induces remissions in virtually every CML patient. Daley's studies have clarified mechanisms of Gleevec resistance and informed development of the next-generation chemotherapeutic drugs nilotinib, ponatinib and asciminib.

Daley's current research seeks to translate insights in stem cell biology into improved therapies for genetic and malignant diseases. His laboratory has pioneered human cell culture-based and murine models of human blood disease and cancer. Important research contributions from his laboratory include the creation of customized stem cells to treat genetic immune deficiency in a mouse model (together with Rudolf Jaenisch), the differentiation of germ cells from embryonic stem cells (cited as a "Top Ten Breakthrough" by Science in 2003), the generation of disease-specific pluripotent stem cells by direct reprogramming of human fibroblasts (cited in the "Breakthrough of the Year" issue of Science magazine in 2008), and demonstration of the role of the RNA-binding protein Lin28 in cancer and metabolic disease.

He has been elected a fellow of the American Association for the Advancement of Science, the American Academy of Arts and Sciences, and the academy of the American Association for Cancer Research. He is an elected member of the National Academy of Sciences, the National Academy of Medicine, the American Society for Clinical Investigation, the Association of American Physicians and the American Pediatric Society. Daley was an inaugural winner of the NIH Director's Pioneer Award (2004), which provides a five-year unrestricted grant to pursue highly innovative research, and received the Judson Daland Prize from the American Philosophical Society for achievement in patient-oriented research, the E. Mead Johnson Award from the American Pediatric Society for contributions to stem cell research, the E. Donnall Thomas Prize from the American Society of Hematology for advances in induced pluripotent stem cell research, and the Rowley Prize from the International Chronic Myeloid Leukemia Foundation. He has also received awards recognizing his contributions to medical research from the National Institutes of Health, the New England Cancer Society, Harvard Medical School, and the Leukemia and Lymphoma Society of America. In addition to funding by the NIH, Daley's research has been supported by the National Science Foundation, Defense Advanced Research Projects Agency, American Cancer Society, Edward Mallinckrodt Jr. Foundation, Burroughs Wellcome Fund, Leukemia and Lymphoma Society of America, Roche Foundation for Anemia Research, Alex's Lemonade Stand, the Ellison Medical Foundation, the Emerson Collective and the Doris Duke Medical Foundation.

Daley has been prominent in advocating for ethical oversight of human stem cell research. On behalf of the International Society for Stem Cell Research (ISSCR), he chaired the special international task force that formulated the ISSCR Guidelines for Human Embryonic Stem Cell Research (2006) and as president of the ISSCR empaneled and served on the special task force that wrote the ISSCR Guidelines for Clinical Translation of Stem Cells (2008), which have served as a roadmap for advancing stem cell science into clinical trials. Daley has testified six times before committees of the United States Senate and United States House of Representatives to advocate for expanded governmental support for stem cell research. He serves as the chair of the executive committee of the Massachusetts Consortium on Pathogen Readiness, formed in 2020 to address the COVID-19 pandemic and threats from emerging infectious diseases. He has served on the scientific advisory board of the Massachusetts Life Sciences Center and on the editorial board of the journals Science, Cell, Cell Stem Cell, Stem Cells, and Blood.
