= Radotinib =

Chemical compound

- Structural formula

Clinical data
- Trade names: Supect
- Routes of administration: Oral (by mouth)

Legal status
- Legal status: Rx-only (South Korea)

Pharmacokinetic data
- Metabolism: Hepatic
- Elimination half-life: ~13–15 h
- Excretion: Fecal and renal

Identifiers
- IUPAC name: 4-Methyl-N-[3-(4-methylimidazol-1-yl)-5-(trifluoromethyl)phenyl]-3-[(4-pyrazin-2-ylpyrimidin-2-yl)amino]benzamide
- CAS Number: 926037-48-1
- PubChem CID: 16063245
- ChemSpider: 17222861
- UNII: I284LJY110
- CompTox Dashboard (EPA): DTXSID90239069

Chemical and physical data
- 3D model (JSmol): Interactive image
- SMILES: Cc1cn(-c2cc(NC(=O)c3ccc(C)c(Nc4nccc(-c5cnccn5)n4)c3)cc(C(F)(F)F)c2)cn1
- InChI: InChI=1S/C27H21F3N8O/c1-16-3-4-18(9-23(16)37-26-33-6-5-22(36-26)24-13-31-7-8-32-24)25(39)35-20-10-19(27(28,29)30)11-21(12-20)38-14-17(2)34-15-38/h3-15H,1-2H3,(H,35,39)(H,33,36,37); Key:DUPWHXBITIZIKZ-UHFFFAOYSA-N

Radotinib (INN; trade name Supect), also known by its investigational code IY5511, is an oral Bcr-Abl tyrosine-kinase inhibitor used in the treatment of Philadelphia chromosome–positive (Ph^{+}) chronic myeloid leukemia (CML). It was developed by Il-Yang Pharmaceutical Co., Ltd (South Korea) and is marketed domestically by Daewoong Pharmaceutical Co., Ltd. Radotinib was approved in South Korea in 2012 for patients with resistance or intolerance to other tyrosine kinase inhibitors such as imatinib.

== Medical uses ==
Radotinib is indicated for the treatment of adult patients with Ph+ CML in the chronic phase who are resistant or intolerant to prior therapy with first-generation tyrosine kinase inhibitors such as imatinib. Its use remains limited to South Korea, where it is prescribed under the brand name Supect.

== Mechanism of action ==
Radotinib is a selective inhibitor of the Bcr-Abl tyrosine kinase, the abnormal fusion protein expressed in Ph^{+} CML. It also inhibits the platelet-derived growth factor receptor (PDGFR). By blocking Bcr-Abl–mediated signaling, radotinib suppresses proliferation of leukemic cells.

== Clinical trials ==
In 2011, Il-Yang initiated a Phase III, multinational, randomized study comparing radotinib with imatinib as first-line therapy in newly diagnosed Ph^{+} CML. A Phase II trial demonstrated efficacy and safety in patients resistant or intolerant to other Bcr-Abl inhibitors, with major cytogenetic response rates comparable to second-generation drugs such as nilotinib.

Common adverse effects observed in clinical studies included hematologic toxicities (thrombocytopenia, neutropenia, anemia), gastrointestinal events, and elevations in liver transaminases.

== Regulatory status ==
Radotinib received regulatory approval in South Korea in 2012. As of 2025, it has not been approved by the U.S. Food and Drug Administration (FDA) or the European Medicines Agency (EMA).

== See also ==
- Imatinib
- Nilotinib
- Dasatinib
- Bcr-Abl tyrosine-kinase inhibitors
