= Asciminib =

Chemical compound

Clinical data
- Trade names: Scemblix
- Other names: ABL001
- License data: US DailyMed: Asciminib
- Pregnancy category: AU: D
- Routes of administration: By mouth
- Drug class: Tyrosine kinase inhibitor
- ATC code: L01EA06 (WHO)

Legal status
- Legal status: AU: S4 (Prescription only); CA: ℞-only; US: ℞-only; EU: Rx-only

Identifiers
- IUPAC name: N-4-[chloro(difluoro)methoxy]phenyl]-6-[(3R)-3-hydroxypyrrolidin-1-yl]-5-(1H-pyrazol-5-yl)pyridine-3-carboxamide;hydrochloride
- CAS Number: 1492952-76-7; as HCl: 2119669-71-3
- PubChem CID: 72165228; as HCl: 133082086
- IUPHAR/BPS: 8962
- DrugBank: DB12597
- ChemSpider: 52085218
- UNII: L1F3R18W77; as HCl: C5U34S9XFV
- KEGG: D11403; as HCl: D11404
- ChEMBL: ChEMBL4208229; as HCl: ChEMBL4297220
- PDB ligand: AY7 (PDBe, RCSB PDB)

Chemical and physical data
- Formula: C_{20}H_{18}ClF_{2}N_{5}O_{3}
- Molar mass: 449.84 g·mol^{−1}
- 3D model (JSmol): Interactive image
- SMILES: O=C(Nc1ccc(OC(F)(F)Cl)cc1)c1cnc(N2CC[C@@H](O)C2)c(-c2ccn[nH]2)c1
- InChI: InChI=1S/C20H18ClF2N5O3/c21-20(22,23)31-15-3-1-13(2-4-15)26-19(30)12-9-16(17-5-7-25-27-17)18(24-10-12)28-8-6-14(29)11-28/h1-5,7,9-10,14,29H,6,8,11H2,(H,25,27)(H,26,30)/t14-/m1/s1; Key:VOVZXURTCKPRDQ-CQSZACIVSA-N

Asciminib, sold under the brand name Scemblix, is a medication used to treat Philadelphia chromosome-positive chronic myeloid leukemia (Ph+ CML). Asciminib is a protein kinase inhibitor.

The most common adverse reactions include upper respiratory tract infections, musculoskeletal pain, fatigue, nausea, rash, and diarrhea. In the pooled safety population in participants with newly diagnosed and previously treated Philadelphia chromosome-positive chronic myeloid leukemia in chronic phase, the most common adverse reactions include musculoskeletal pain, rash, fatigue, upper respiratory tract infection, headache, abdominal pain, and diarrhea. The most common laboratory abnormalities include decreased lymphocyte count, decreased leukocyte count, decreased platelet count, decreased neutrophil count, and decreased calcium corrected.

Asciminib was approved for medical use in the United States in October 2021, and in the European Union in August 2022.

== Medical uses ==
Asciminib is indicated for the treatment of adults with Philadelphia chromosome-positive chronic myeloid leukemia in chronic phase, previously treated with two or more tyrosine kinase inhibitors; or Philadelphia chromosome-positive chronic myeloid leukemia in chronic phase with the T315I mutation.

In October 2024, the US Food and Drug Administration (FDA) expanded the indicated to include people with Philadelphia chromosome-positive chronic myeloid leukemia in chronic phase.

== Adverse effects ==
Common side effects of Asciminib are symptoms of a cold, muscle pain, joint pain, bone pain, fatigue, nausea, diarrhea, rash as well as the patient displaying abnormal blood tests. Serious side effects of the medication include high blood pressure, low blood cell count, problems with the pancreas, and heart issues. Side effects of the medication on the pancreas may be observed via changes in serum lipase and amylase levels.

== Pharmacodynamics ==
Asciminib is described as a "STAMP inhibitor," which means "specifically targeting the ABL myristoyl pocket." The wild-type ABL has a myristoylated N-terminus, which binds to an allosteric site, but the ABL fusion protein does not have the myristoylated domain. In the wild-type protein, when myristoylated N-terminus binds to the allosteric site, the kinase has reduced activity. Since the mutant fusion protein does not have the myristoylated N-terminus domain, it is not subject to this form of regulation, and thus the fusion protein is constitutively active. Asciminib binds to the allosteric site, resulting in an inhibition of bcr-abl activity.

Unlike other bcr-abl inhibitors, such as imatinib, asciminib does not bind to the ATP-binding site on the active site of the enzyme. Asciminib and active site bcr-abl inhibitors have non-overlapping resistance mutations. The mutations A337V and P223S overcome the inhibitory activity of asciminib, but asciminib is not affected by the notorious T315I mutation that affects most ATP-competitive active site inhibitors, except ponatinib.

Asciminib is a substrate of the CYP3A4 enzyme. Asciminib is an inhibitor of CYP3A4, CYP2C9, and P-glycoprotein. Asciminib reaches steady state in three days. The volume of distribution of asciminib is 151 L.

== History ==
=== CABL001X2101 Clinical Study ===
The efficacy of asciminib in the treatment of participants with Ph+ CML-CP with the T315I mutation was evaluated in a multi-center open-label study CABL001X2101 (NCT02081378). Testing for T315I mutation utilized a qualitative p210 BCR-ABL mutation test using Sanger Sequencing.

The US Food and Drug Administration (FDA) approved asciminib (commercial name Scremblix) based on evidence from a clinical trial of 48 participants with chronic myeloid leukemia with a certain type of mutation (T315I mutation). The trial was conducted at 18 sites in ten countries (Australia, France, Germany, Italy, Japan, Netherlands, the Republic of Korea, Singapore, Spain, and the United States). Participants received asciminib twice daily until disease worsened or unacceptable toxicity occurred. The benefit of asciminib was evaluated in Philadelphia chromosome-positive chronic myeloid leukemia participants with the T315 mutation by measuring the reduction of abnormal cells in participants' blood to a very low level after 96 weeks of treatment.

=== ASCEMBL Clinical Study ===
The efficacy of asciminib in the treatment of participants with Ph+ CML in chronic phase (Ph+ CML-CP), previously treated with two or more tyrosine kinase inhibitors was evaluated in the multi-center, randomized, active-controlled, and open-label study ASCEMBL (NCT 03106779).

=== ASC4FIRST Clinical Study ===
The efficacy of asciminib in the treatment of participants with newly diagnosed Philadelphia chromosome-positive chronic myeloid leukemia in chronic phase was evaluated in the multi-center, randomized, active-controlled, and open-label study ASC4FIRST (NCT04971226). A total of 405 participants were randomized (1:1) to receive either asciminib or investigator-selected tyrosine kinase inhibitors (IS-TKIs) (imatinib, nilotinib, dasatinib, or bosutinib). The main efficacy outcome measure was major molecular response rate at 48 weeks. The major molecular response rate at 48 weeks was 68% (95% CI: 61, 74) in the asciminib arm and 49% (95% CI: 42, 56) in the IS-TKIs arm (difference 19% [95% CI: 10, 28], p-value <0.001). Within the imatinib stratum, the major molecular response rate was 69% (95% CI: 59, 78) in the asciminib arm and 40% (95% CI: 31, 50) in the IS-TKIs arm (difference 30% [95% CI: 17, 42], p-value <0.001).

== Society and culture ==
=== Legal status ===
In June 2022, the Committee for Medicinal Products for Human Use of the European Medicines Agency (EMA) adopted a positive opinion, recommending the granting of a marketing authorization for the medicinal product Scemblix, intended for the treatment of adults with Philadelphia chromosome‑positive chronic myeloid leukemia in chronic phase who have previously been treated with two or more tyrosine kinase inhibitors. The applicant for this medicinal product is Novartis Europharm Limited. Asciminib was approved for medical use in the European Union in August 2022.

The US Food and Drug Administration (FDA) granted the application for asciminib priority review, fast track, orphan drug, and breakthrough therapy designations.

In July 2024, the US Food and Drug Administration (FDA) granted priority review designation to asciminib for the treatment of newly diagnosed adults with Philadelphia chromosome-positive CML in chronic phase. The FDA granted accelerated approval to asciminib for adults with newly diagnosed Philadelphia chromosome-positive chronic myeloid leukemia (Ph+ CML) in chronic phase (CP). The applicant was Novartis AG.
