= C29H27F3N6O =

The molecular formula C_{29}H_{27}F_{3}N_{6}O may refer to:

- Olverembatinib
- Ponatinib
