= D+Q =

D+Q may refer to:

- Dasatinib#Dasatinib+Quercetin
- Drawn & Quarterly
