= Tumors of the hematopoietic and lymphoid tissues =

Tumors that affect the blood, bone marrow, lymph, and lymphatic system

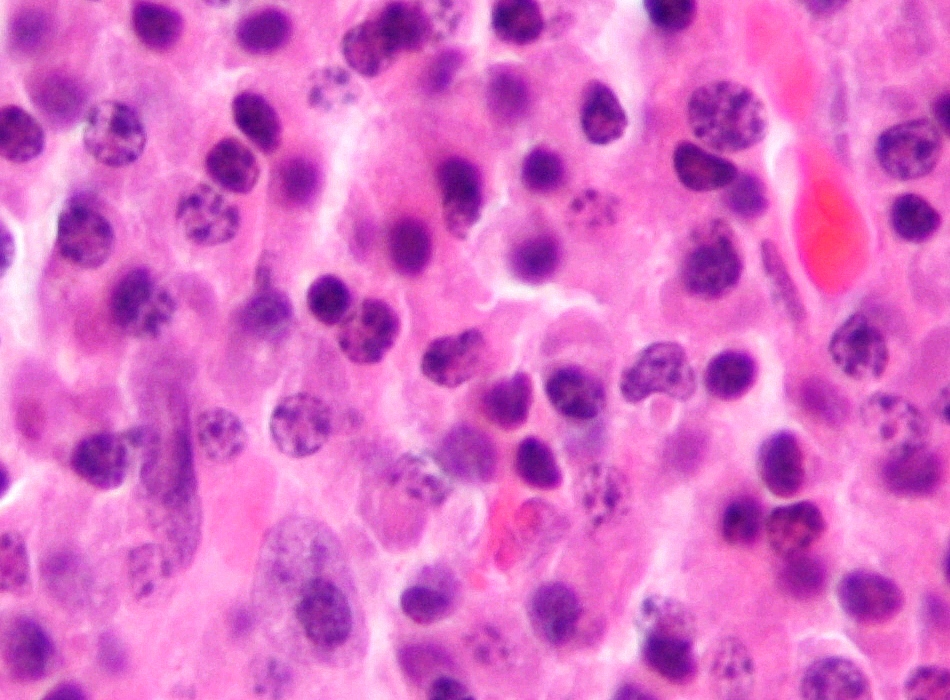
- Micrograph of a plasmacytoma, a hematological malignancy

Tumors of the hematopoietic and lymphoid tissues (American English) or tumours of the haematopoietic and lymphoid tissues (British English) are tumors that affect the blood, bone marrow, lymph, and lymphatic system. Because these tissues are all intimately connected through both the circulatory system and the immune system, a disease affecting one will often affect the others as well, making aplasia, myeloproliferation and lymphoproliferation (and thus the leukemias, myelomas, and the lymphomas) closely related and often overlapping problems. While uncommon in solid tumors, chromosomal translocations are a common cause of these diseases. This commonly leads to a different approach in diagnosis and treatment of hematological malignancies. Hematological malignancies are malignant neoplasms ("cancer"), and they are generally treated by specialists in hematology and/or oncology. In some centers "hematology/oncology" is a single subspecialty of internal medicine while in others they are considered separate divisions (there are also surgical and radiation oncologists). Not all hematological disorders are malignant ("cancerous"); these other blood conditions may also be managed by a hematologist.

Hematological malignancies may derive from either of the two major blood cell lineages: myeloid and lymphoid cell lines. The myeloid cell line normally produces granulocytes, erythrocytes, thrombocytes, macrophages and mast cells; the lymphoid cell line produces B, T, NK and plasma cells. Lymphomas, lymphocytic leukemias, and myeloma are from the lymphoid line, while acute and chronic myelogenous leukemia, myelodysplastic syndromes and myeloproliferative diseases are myeloid in origin.

A subgroup of them are more severe and are known as haematological malignancies (British English)/hematological malignancies (American English) or blood cancer. They may also be referred to as liquid tumors.

== Diagnosis ==
For the analysis of a suspected hematological malignancy, a complete blood count and blood film are essential, as malignant cells can show in characteristic ways on light microscopy. When there is lymphadenopathy, a biopsy from a lymph node is generally undertaken surgically. In general, a bone marrow biopsy is also used for the analysis of these diseases. All specimens are examined microscopically to determine the nature of the malignancy. A number of these diseases can now be classified by cytogenetics (AML, CML) or immunophenotyping (lymphoma, myeloma, CLL) of the malignant cells.

=== Classification ===
Historically, hematological malignancies have been most commonly divided by whether the malignancy is mainly located in the blood (leukemia) or in lymph nodes (lymphomas).

Relative proportions of hematological malignancies in the United States

Type of hematological malignancy	Percentage	Total
Leukemias	—	30.4%
Acute lymphoblastic leukemia (ALL)	4.0%	
Acute myeloid leukemia (AML)	8.7%	
Chronic lymphocytic leukemia (CLL) sorted under lymphomas according to current WHO classification; called small lymphocytic lymphoma (SLL) when leukemic cells are absent.	10.2%	
Chronic myelogenous leukemia (CML)	3.7%	
Acute monocytic leukemia (AMoL)	0.7%	
Other leukemias	3.1%	
Lymphomas	—	55.6%
Hodgkin's lymphomas (all four subtypes)	7.0%	
Non-Hodgkin's lymphomas (all subtypes)	48.6%	
Myelomas		14.0%
Total		100%

==== World Health Organization ====
4th Edition

NOS = "Not otherwise specified"

- Myeloid neoplasms
  - Myeloproliferative neoplasms
    - Chronic myeloid leukaemia, BCR-ABL1-positive
    - Chronic neutrophilic leukaemia
    - Polycythamemia vera
    - Primary myelofibrosis
    - Essential thrombocythemia
    - Chronic eosinophilic leukaemia, NOS
    - Myeloproliferative neoplasm, unclassifiable
  - Mastocytosis
    - Cutaneous mastocytosis
    - Indolent systemic mastocytosis
    - Systemic mastocytosis with an associated hematological neoplasm
    - Aggressive systemic mastocytosis
    - Mast cell leukaemia
    - Mast cell sarcoma
  - Myeloid/lymphoid neoplasms with eosinophilia and gene rearrangement
    - Myeloid/lymphoid neoplasms with PDGFRA rearrangement
    - Myeloid/lymphoid neoplasms with PDGFRB rearrangement
    - Myeloid/lymphoid neoplasms with FGFR1 rearrangement
    - Myeloid/lymphoid neoplasms with PCM1―JAK2
  - Myelodysplastic/myeloproliferative neoplasms
    - Chronic myelomonocytic leukaemia
    - Atypical chronic myeloid leukaemia, BCR-ABL1―negative
    - Juvenile myelomonocytic leukaemia
    - Myelodysplastic/myeloproliferative neoplasm with ring sideroblasts and thrombocytosis
    - Myelodysplastic/myeloproliferative neoplasm, unclassifiable
  - Myelodysplastic syndromes
    - Myelodysplastic syndrome with single lineage dysplasia
    - Myelodysplastic syndrome with ring sideroblasts and single lineage dysplasia
    - Myelodysplastic syndrome with ring sideroblasts and multilineage dysplasia
    - Myelodysplastic syndrome with multilineage dysplasia
    - Myelodysplastic syndrome with excess blasts
    - Myelodysplastic syndrome with isolated del(5q)
    - Myelodysplastic syndrome, unclassifiable
    - Refractory cytopenia of childhood
  - Myeloid neoplasms with germline predisposition
    - Acute myeloid leukaemia with germline CEBPA mutation
    - Myeloid neoplasms with germline DDX41 mutation
    - Myeloid neoplasms with germline RUNX1 mutation
    - Myeloid neoplasms with germline ANKRD26 mutation
    - Myeloid neoplasms with germline ETV6 mutation
    - Myeloid neoplasms with germline GATA2 mutation
  - Acute myeloid leukaemia (AML) and related precursor neoplasms
    - AML with recurrent genetic abnormalities
      - AML with t(8;21)(q22;q22.1); RUNX1-RUNX1T1
      - AML with inv(16)(p13.1q22) or t(16;16)(p13.1;q22); CBFB-MYH11
      - Acute promyelocytic leukaemia with PML-RARA
      - AML with t(9;11)(p21.3;q23.3); KMT2A-MLLT3
      - AML with t(6;9)(p23;q34.1); DEK-NUP214
      - AML with inv(3)(q21.3q26.2) or t(3;3)(q21.3;q26.2); GATA2, MECOM
      - AML (megakaryoblastic) with t(1;22)(p13.3;q13.1); RBM15-MKL1
      - AML with BCR-ABL1
      - AML with mutated NPM1
      - AML with biallelic mutation of CEBPA
      - AML with mutated RUNX1
    - AML with myelodysplasia-related changes
    - Therapy-related myeloid neoplasms
    - Acute myeloid leukaemia, NOS
      - AML with minimal differentiation
      - AML without maturation
      - AML with maturation
      - Acute myelomonocytic leukaemia
      - Acute monoblastic and monocytic leukaemia
      - Pure erythroid leukaemia
      - Acute megakaryoblastic leukaemia
      - Acute basophilic leukaemia
      - Acute panmyelosis with myelofibrosis
    - Myeloid sarcoma
    - Myeloid proliferations associated with Down syndrome
      - Transient abnormal myelopoiesis associated with Down syndrome
      - Myeloid leukaemia associated with Down syndrome
  - Blastic plasmacytoid dendritic cell neoplasm
  - Acute leukaemias of ambiguous lineage
    - Acute undifferentiated leukaemia
    - Mixed-phenotype acute leukaemia with t(9;22)(q34.1;q11.2); BCR-ABL1
    - Mixed-phenotype acute leukaemia with t(v;11q23.3); KMT2A-rearranged
    - Mixed-phenotype acute leukaemia, B/myeloid, NOS
    - Mixed-phenotype acute leukaemia, T/myeloid, NOS
    - Mixed-phenotype acute leukaemia, NOS, rare types
    - Acute leukaemias of ambiguous lineage, NOS
- Lymphoid neoplasms
  - Precursor lymphoid neoplasms
    - B-lymphoblastic leukaemia/lymphoma, NOS
    - B-lymphoblastic leukaemia/lymphoma with t(9;22)(q34.1;q11.2); BCR-ABL1
    - B-lymphoblastic leukaemia/lymphoma with t(v;11q23.3); KMT2A-rearranged
    - B-lymphoblastic leukaemia/lymphoma with t(12;21)(p13.2;q22.1); ETV6-RUNX1
    - B-lymphoblastic leukaemia/lymphoma with hyperdiploidy
    - B-lymphoblastic leukaemia/lymphoma with hypodiploidy (hypodiploid ALL)
    - B-lymphoblastic leukaemia/lymphoma with t(5;14)(q31.1;q32.1); IGH/IL3
    - B-lymphoblastic leukaemia/lymphoma with t(1;19)(q23;p13.3); TCF3-PBX1
    - B-lymphoblastic leukaemia/lymphoma, BCR-ABL 1―like
    - B-lymphoblastic leukaemia/lymphoma with iAMP21
    - T-lymphoblastic leukaemia/lymphoma
    - Early T-cell precursor lymphoblastic leukaemia
    - NK-lymphoblastic leukaemia/lymphoma
  - Mature B-cell neoplasms
    - Chronic lymphocytic leukaemia (CLL)/ small lymphocytic lymphoma
    - Monoclonal B-cell lymphocytosis, CLL-type
    - Monoclonal B-cell lymphocytosis, non-CLL-type
    - B-cell prolymphocytic leukaemia
    - Splenic marginal zone lymphoma
    - Hairy cell leukaemia
    - Splenic B-cell lymphoma/leukaemia, unclassifiable
      - Splenic diffuse red pulp small B-cell lymphoma
      - Hairy cell leukaemia variant
    - Lymphoplasmacytic lymphoma
      - Waldentrom macroglobulinemia
    - IgM monoclonal gammopathy of undetermined significance
    - Heavy chain diseases
      - Mu heavy chain disease
      - Gamma heavy chain disease
      - Alpha heavy chain disease
    - Plasma cell neoplasms
      - Non-IgM monoclonal gammopathy of undetermined significance
      - Plasma cell myeloma
      - Solitary plasmacytoma of bone
      - Extraosseous plasmacytoma
      - Monoclonal immunoglobulin deposition diseases
        - Primary amyloidosis
        - Light chain and heavy chain deposition diseases
    - Extranodal marginal zone lymphoma of mucosa- associated lymphoid tissue (MALT lymphoma)
    - Nodal marginal zone lymphoma
      - Paediatric nodal marginal zone lymphoma
    - Follicular lymphoma
      - In situ follicular neoplasia
      - Duodenal-type follicular lymphoma
      - Testicular follicular lymphoma
    - Paediatric-type follicular lymphoma
    - Large B-cell lymphoma with IRF4 rearrangement
    - Primary cutaneous follicle centre lymphoma
    - Mantle cell lymphoma
      - In situ mantle cell neoplasia
    - Diffuse large B-cell lymphoma (DLBCL), NOS
      - Germinal centre B-cell subtype
      - Activated B-cell subtype
    - T-cell/histiocyte-rich large B-cell lymphoma
    - Primary DLBCL of the CNS
    - Primary cutaneous DLBCL, leg type
    - EBV-positive DLBCL, NOS
    - EBV-positive mucocutaneous ulcer
    - DLBCL associated with chronic inflammation
      - Fibrin-associated diffuse large B-cell lymphoma
    - Lymphomatoid granulomatosis, grade 1,2
    - Lymphomatoid granulomatosis, grade 3
    - Primary mediastinal (thymic) large B-cell lymphoma
    - Intravascular large B-cell lymphoma
    - ALK-positive large B-cell lymphoma
    - Plasmablastic lymphoma
    - Primary effusion lymphoma
    - Multicentric Castleman disease
    - HHV8-positive DLBCL, NOS
    - HHV8-positive germinotropic lymphoproliferative disorder
    - Burkitt lymphoma
    - Burkitt-like lymphoma with 11q aberration
    - High-grade B-cell lymphoma
      - High-grade B-cell lymphoma with MYC and BCL2 and/or BCL6 rearrangements
      - High-grade B-cell lymphoma, NOS
    - B-cell lymphoma, unclassifiable, with features intermediate between DLBCL and classic Hodgkin lymphoma
  - Mature T- and NK-cell neoplasms
    - T-cell prolymphocytic leukaemia
    - T-cell large granular lymphocytic leukaemia
    - Chronic lymphoproliferative disorder of NK cells
    - Aggressive NK-cell leukaemia
    - Systemic EBV-positive T-cell lymphoma of childhood
    - Chronic active EBV infection of T- and NK-cell type, systemic form
    - Hydroa vacciniforme-like lymphoproliferative disorder
    - Severe mosquito bite allergy
    - Adult T-cell leukaemia/lymphoma
    - Extranodal NK/T-cell lymphoma, nasal type
    - Enteropathy-associated T-cell lymphoma
    - Monomorphic epitheliotropic intestinal T-cell lymphoma
    - Intestinal T-cell lymphoma, NOS
    - Indolent T-cell lymphoproliferative disorder of the gastrointestinal tract
    - Hepatosplenic T-cell lymphoma
    - Subcutaneous panniculitis-like T-cell lymphoma
    - Mycosis fungoides
    - Sézary syndrome
    - Primary cutaneous CD30-positive T-cell lymphoproliferative disorders
      - Lymphomatoid papulosis
      - Primary cutaneous anaplastic large cell lymphoma
    - Primary cutaneous gamma delta T-cell lymphoma
    - Primary cutaneous CD8-positive aggressive epidermotropic cytotoxic T-cell lymphoma
    - Primary cutaneous acral CD8-positive T-cell lymphoma
    - Primary cutaneous CD4-positive small/medium T-cell lymphoproliferative disorder
    - Peripheral T-cell lymphoma, NOS
    - Angioimmunoblastic T-cell lymphoma
    - Follicular T-cell lymphoma
    - Nodal peripheral T-cell lymphoma with T follicular helper phenotype
    - Anaplastic large cell lymphoma, ALK-positive
    - Anaplastic large cell lymphoma, ALK-negative
    - Breast implant-associated anaplastic large cell lymphoma
  - Hodgkin lymphomas
    - Nodular lymphocyte predominant Hodgkin lymphoma
    - Classic Hodgkin lymphoma
      - Nodular sclerosis classic Hodgkin lymphoma
      - Lymphocyte-rich classic Hodgkin lymphoma
      - Mixed cellularity classic Hodgkin lymphoma
      - Lymphocyte-depleted classic Hodgkin lymphoma
  - Immunodeficiency-associated lymphoproliferative disorders
    - Post-transplant lymphoproliferative disorders (PTLD)
      - Non-destructive PTLD
        - Plasmacytic hyperplasia PTLD
        - Infectious mononucleosis PTLD
        - Florid follicular hyperplasia
      - Polymorphic PTLD
      - Monomorphic PTLD
      - Classic Hodgkin Lymphoma PTLD
    - Other iatrogenic immunodeficiency- associated lymphoproliferative disorders
- Histiocytic and dendritic cell neoplasms
  - Histiocytic sarcoma
  - Langerhans cell histiocytosis, NOS
  - Langerhans cell histiocytosis, monostotic
  - Langerhans cell histiocytosis, polystotic
  - Langerhans cell histiocytosis, disseminated
  - Langerhans cell sarcoma
  - Indeterminate dendritic cell tumour
  - Interdigitating dendritic cell sarcoma
  - Follicular dendritic cell sarcoma
  - Fibroblastic reticular cell tumour
  - Disseminated juvenile xanthogranuloma
  - Erdheim–Chester disease

== Treatment ==
Treatment can occasionally consist of "watchful waiting" (e.g., in CLL) or symptomatic treatment (e.g., blood transfusions in MDS). The more aggressive forms of disease require treatment with chemotherapy, radiotherapy, immunotherapy and—in some cases—a bone marrow transplant. The use of rituximab has been established for the treatment of B-cell–derived hematologic malignancies, including follicular lymphoma (FL) and diffuse large B-cell lymphoma (DLBCL).

In addition to cure-directed treatment, people can benefit from self-care to manage symptoms. For example, aerobic exercise, such as walking, can reduce fatigue and feelings of depression in people with hematological malignancies.

=== Follow-up ===
If treatment has been successful ("complete" or "partial remission"), a person is generally followed up at regular intervals to detect recurrence and monitor for "secondary malignancy" (an uncommon side-effect of some chemotherapy and radiotherapy regimens—the appearance of another form of cancer). In the follow-up, which should be done at pre-determined regular intervals, general anamnesis is combined with complete blood count and determination of lactate dehydrogenase or thymidine kinase in serum. Hematological malignancies as well as their treatments are associated with complications affecting many organs, with the lungs being frequently affected.

== Etiology ==
Chromosomal translocations are a major etiologic factor in hematologic malignancies. Such translocations usually arise in cells as the result of aberrant DNA double-strand break repair by an imprecise processes such as non-homologous end joining. Chromosome instability in chronic myeloid leukemia may be due to oxidative damage to DNA along with impairments of genetic surveillance leading to imprecise error prone DNA repair.

== Epidemiology ==
Taken together, haematological malignancies account for 9.5% of new cancer diagnoses in the United States and 30,000 patients in the UK are diagnosed each year. Within this category, lymphomas are more common than leukemias.

== See also ==
- Myelodysplastic–myeloproliferative diseases
