= Olverembatinib =

Chemical compound

Clinical data
- Other names: GZD-824; GZD824

Legal status
- Legal status: Investigational

Identifiers
- IUPAC name: 4-Methyl-N-[4-[(4-methylpiperazin-1-yl)methyl]-3-(trifluoromethyl)phenyl]-3-[2-(1H-pyrazolo[3,4-b]pyridin-5-yl)ethynyl]benzamide
- CAS Number: 1257628-77-5
- PubChem CID: 51038269
- IUPHAR/BPS: 10630
- DrugBank: DB16185
- ChemSpider: 29395146
- UNII: KV1M7Q3CBP
- ChEMBL: ChEMBL2316582
- CompTox Dashboard (EPA): DTXSID301352011

Chemical and physical data
- Formula: C_{29}H_{27}F_{3}N_{6}O
- Molar mass: 532.571 g·mol^{−1}
- 3D model (JSmol): Interactive image
- SMILES: CC1=C(C=C(C=C1)C(=O)NC2=CC(=C(C=C2)CN3CCN(CC3)C)C(F)(F)F)C#CC4=CC5=C(NN=C5)N=C4
- InChI: InChI=1S/C29H27F3N6O/c1-19-3-5-22(14-21(19)6-4-20-13-24-17-34-36-27(24)33-16-20)28(39)35-25-8-7-23(26(15-25)29(30,31)32)18-38-11-9-37(2)10-12-38/h3,5,7-8,13-17H,9-12,18H2,1-2H3,(H,35,39)(H,33,34,36); Key:TZKBVRDEOITLRB-UHFFFAOYSA-N

Olverembatinib is a BCR-ABL1 tyrosine kinase inhibitor developed by Ascentage Pharma. In 2021, it was approved in China "for the treatment of adult patients with TKI-resistant chronic-phase CML (CML-CP) or accelerated-phase CML (CML-AP) harbouring the T315I mutation".
