= Myelodysplastic–myeloproliferative diseases =

Myelodysplastic-myeloproliferative diseases
- Specialty: Hematology

Myelodysplastic–myeloproliferative diseases are a category of hematological malignancies which have characteristics of both myelodysplastic and myeloproliferative conditions.

When a hematological malignancy is characterised by normal differentiation of cells of myeloid cell line, it is referred to as myeloproliferative. On the other hand, when there is abnormal differentiation of cells of myeloid cell line, it is referred to as myelodysplastic.
