= Philadelphia chromosome =

Genetic abnormality in leukemia cancer cells

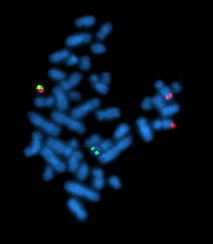
- A metaphase cell positive for the BCR/ABL rearrangement using FISH
- Specialty: Oncology

The Philadelphia chromosome or Philadelphia translocation (Ph) is an abnormal version of chromosome 22 where a part of the Abelson murine leukemia 1 (ABL1) gene on chromosome 9 breaks off and attaches to the breakpoint cluster region (BCR) gene in chromosome 22. The balanced reciprocal translocation between the long arms of 9 and 22 chromosomes [t (9; 22) (q34; q11)] results in the fusion gene BCR::ABL1. The oncogenic protein with persistently enhanced tyrosine kinase (TK) activity transcribed by the BCR::ABL1 fusion gene can lead to rapid, uncontrolled growth of immature white blood cells that accumulates in the blood and bone marrow.

The Philadelphia chromosome is present in the bone marrow cells of a vast majority of chronic myelogenous leukemia (CML) patients. The expression patterns of different BCR-ABL1 transcripts vary during the progression of CML. Each variant is present in a distinct leukemia phenotype and can be used to predict response to therapy and clinical outcomes. The Ph is also observed in patients with acute lymphocytic leukemia (ALL), acute myelogenous leukemia (AML), and mixed-phenotype acute leukemia.

== Molecular biology ==
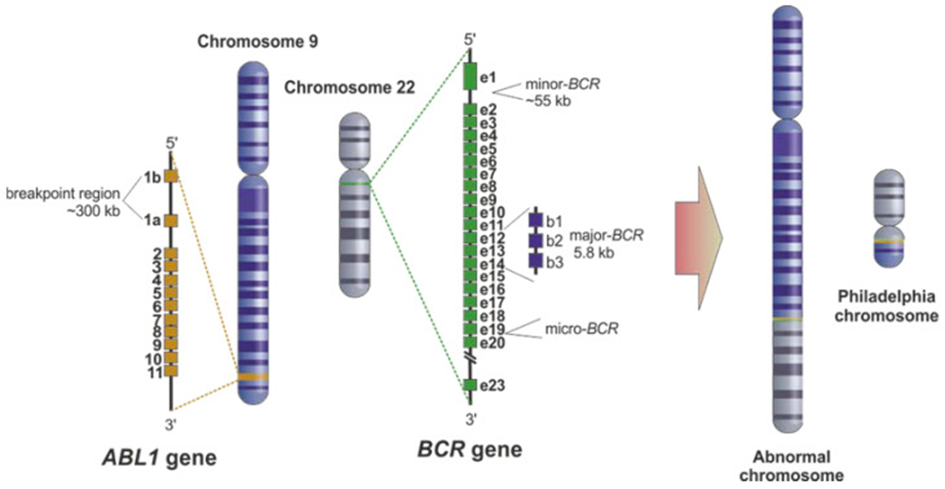
Schematic of the Philadelphia chromosome formation, showcasing exons in the ABL1 and BCR gene, and the central breakpoint regions

The chromosomal abnormality in the Philadelphia chromosome from the reciprocal translocation t(9;22)(q34;q11), is the result of fragments from chromosomes 9 and 22 swapping places. The ABL proto-oncogene 1 on chromosome 9, from region q34, is juxtaposed with a portion of the BCR gene on chromosome 22, region q11.2. The derivative chromosome 22 produced by this translocation is known as the Philadelphia chromosome. This translocation creates a fusion gene, BCR::ABL1, which codes for a constitutively active ("always on") tyrosine kinase signaling protein, driving uncontrolled cell division.

The formation of the Philadelphia chromosome is due to the fusion of the BCR and ABL1 genes. ABL1 is derived from Abelson murine leukemia, a retrovirus that causes leukemia and lymphoma in mice. It is named after Herbert T. Abelson, who discovered it in 1970. BCR stands for breakpoint cluster region because of the relatively small genomic region where the DNA breaks occurs. The fusion can happen at different points in the BCR gene, where the gene will fuse with exon 2 of ABL (breakpoints in exon 3 of ABL1 have also been observed, but are less frequent). The BCR::ABL1 oncogene exists in three primary isoforms depending on the breakpoint site of the BCR gene and are named after the fuse region, and the molecular weight of the transcribed BCR-ABL1 fusion protein, and all encode for a tyrosine kinase protein.

- The e1a2 transcript is a fusion between exon 1 of BCR, also called the minor breakpoint region (m-BCR), and exon 2 of ABL1 and encodes an oncoprotein of 185-190 kDa, referred to as P190. BCR::ABL1 is associated with around 20-30% of all Philadelphia chromosome positive B-cell ALL (ph+ B-ALL) and is the most genetic subgroup of B-ALL. The incident rate for ALL is age related, as the incident rate increases to 50% for ALL in patients aged 50 years and older. where P190 is associated with 60-80% of these.
- The e13a2 and e14a2 transcripts found in the major breakpoint region (M-BCR), which consists of exons 12 through 16. These transcripts encode for a oncoprotein of size 210kDa, and is referred to as P210. P210 is associated with over 95% of CML cases, with a 50/50 split between the e13a2 and e14a2 variants. Additionally, e13a2 and e14a2 has been found to be co-expressed in an estimated 5-10% of CML patients. P210 is also found to be present in 40% of adult and 10% of child B-ALL cases. CML has an incidence of 50 cases per million per year
- Lastly, the e19a2 transcript, located in the μ-BCR region, produces an oncoprotein of 230kDa which is referred to as P230. This variant is uncommon in comparison, and has been linked to the rare disease chronic neutrophilic leukemia (CNL), which falls under mixed-phenotype acute leukemias.

Detection of these variants is carried out using methods such as Sanger sequencing, reverse transcription polymerase chain reaction (RT-PCR), qPCR, Flourescense In Situ Hybridization (FISH), and southern blotting. However, many laboratories are working on incorporating Next Generation Sequencing (NGS) into routine diagnostic analysis as NGS technology is rapidly improving, and will in the near future enable full clinical sequencing of the entire gene.

The normal BCR gene is ubiquitously expressed cytoplasmic protein with many known functionalities. ABL1 gene expresses a membrane-associated protein, a nonreceptor protein-tyrosine kinase. ABL1 is linked to multiple processes related to cell growth and survival, such as cytoskeleton and actin remodelling, and inhibition of cell cycle progression. ABL1 can also be found translocated in the nucleus and has DNA binding capabilities, as it is involved in DNA damage control and repair, and apoptosis. The BCR-ABL1 transcript is also translated into a tyrosine kinase containing domains from both the BCR and ABL1 genes. The activity of tyrosine kinases is typically regulated in an auto-inhibitory fashion, but the BCR-ABL1 fusion gene codes for a protein that is constitutively activated, leading to impaired DNA binding and unregulated cell division (i.e. cancer).

== Mechanisms ==
The formation of the BCR::ABL1 oncogene leads to a constitutively active Tyrosine kinase, which is important for transformation of hematopoietic cells. Kinases are enzymes that add phosphate groups to their substrates. In cell biology and cell signalling, phosphorylated substrates are mainly used as a "on" signal, usually setting in motion a cascade of downstream signalling pathways. The high activity of TK leads to a chronic activation of signalling pathways associated with all stages of cell transformation. Resulting in uncontrolled cell proliferation, blocked cell differentiation, and inhibited apoptosis. Meaning cells with the BCR::ABL1 fusion multiply uncontrollably, without differentiating into mature white blood cells that live longer due to a lack of apoptosis promoting signals. This leads to a buildup of these immature white blood cells in the bloodstream There are several signalling pathways associated with the BCR::ABL1 pathogenesis, such as: the Mitogen-activated protein kinase (MAPK/RAS) pathway, PI3K-AKT-mTOR (PAM) pathway, Janus kinase (JAK) - Signal transducers and activators of transcription (STAT) pathway and the Protein Phosphatase 2A (PP2A) tumour suppressor gene –β-catenin pathway.

=== MAPK Pathway ===
The MAPK pathway includes several key signalling components, and phosphorylation events known to play a crucial part in carcinogenesis. MAPK is composed of multiple signalling cascades, of which the RAS-RAF-MEK-ERK signalling pathway can be found. This pathway is known to play a vital role in cell development, proliferation and survival. Mutations in, and abnormal activation of this pathway will induce tumours, being present in 30% of all cancers. BCR::ABL1 fusions will create constitutively active tyrosine kinases. BCR::ABL1 contains a kinase domain containing Tyr 177, which is a binding site for growth factor receptor binding protein 2 (GRB2). GRB2 binds to a protein called son of sevenless (SOS), a guanine nucleotide exchange factor (GEF). SOS facilitates the conversion of inactive RAS-GDP to active RAS-GTP, which turns on the cascade of enzymes which the RAS-RAF-MEK-ERK pathway is composed of. All steps in this pathway are phosphorylation of enzyme downstream of the signalling pathway, which ends with ERK which in turn phosphorylates hundreds of substrates in the cytoplasm and nucleus which regulate many cellular processes including proliferation, survival, and growth. The RAS/RAF/MEK/ERK pathway is also implicated in overexpression of osteopontin (OPN), which is important for maintenance of the hematopoietic stem cell niche, which indirectly influences unchecked proliferation characteristic of leukemic cells. The RAS-MAPK pathway is associated with many types of cancers, including CML and ph+ ALL, being also linked to imatinib resistance in some cases.

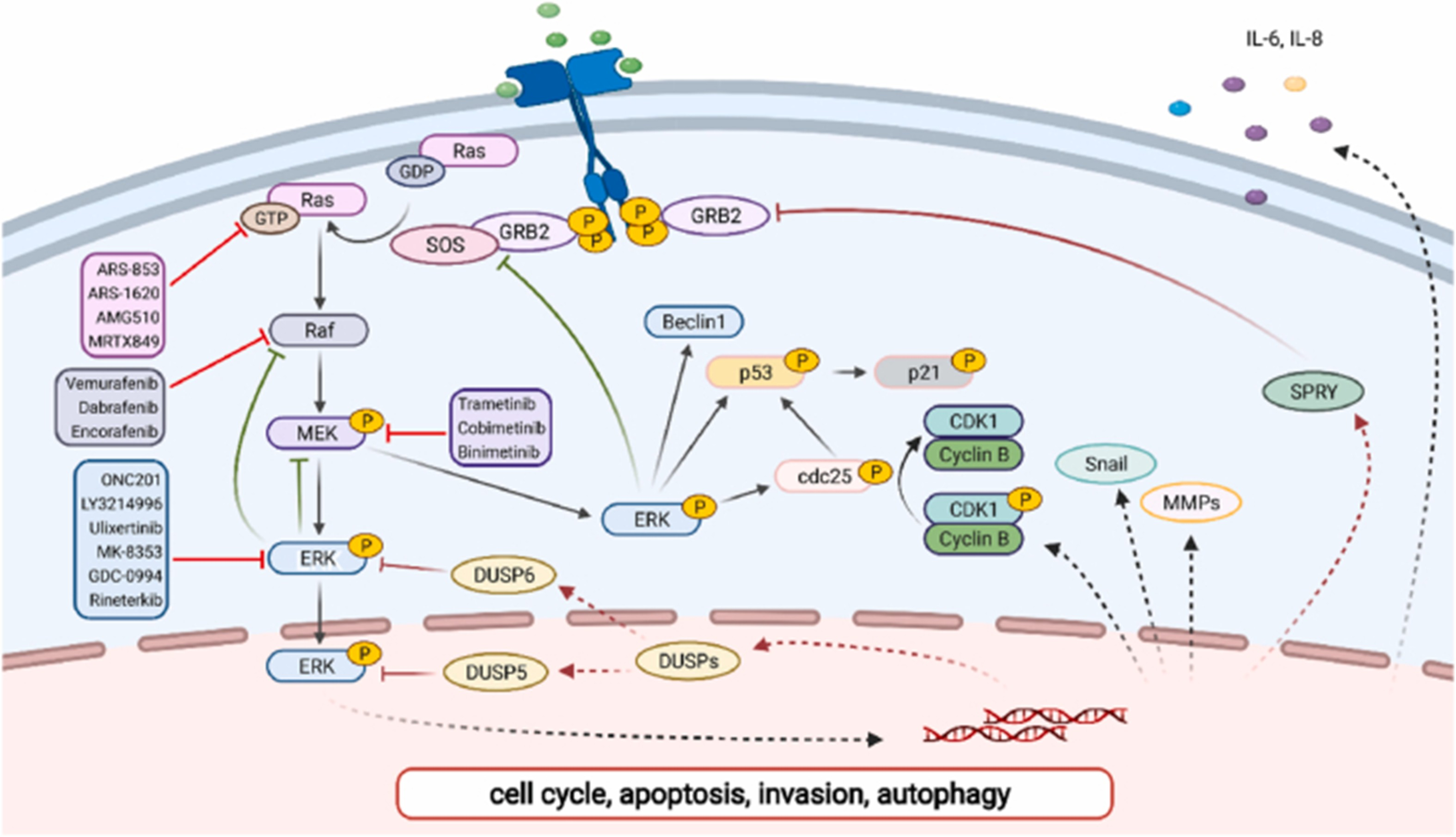
Overview map of enzymes which compose and are impacted by the RAS pathway

=== PI3K-AKT-mTOR (PAM) pathway ===
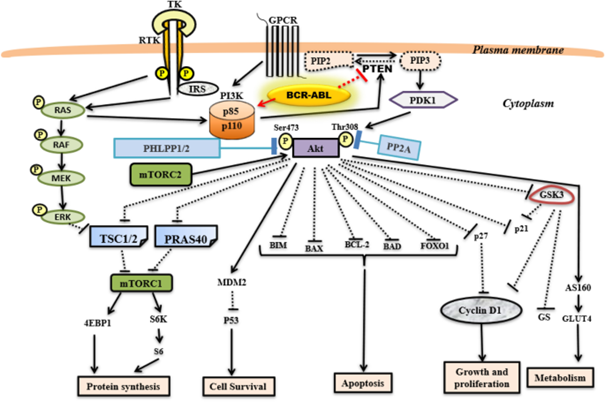
Overview map of enzymes which compose and are impacted by the PI3K pathway

Associated with cell survival, growth and cell cycle, the PAM signalling pathway plays a central role in both CML, ALL, other leukemias and solid tumours, being found in around 50% of all cancers. Normally the PAM signalling pathway maintains and controls growth factors in all higher eukaryotic cells in response to external stimuli. Hyperactivation of this pathway therefore promotes pro-survival intracellular signalling via the PAM pathway, inducing drug resistance. In cancer cells, the PAM pathway gets stimulated by receptors like G-protein-coupled receptors (GPCR), and receptor tyrosine kinases (RTKs), among others. It is especially through the RTKs that cells with the BCR::ABL1 fusion, the PAM pathway is activated. PI3K phosphorylates phosphatidylinositol 4,5-bisphosphate (PIP_{2}) into phosphatidylinositol 3,4,5-trisphosphate (PIP_{3}). The phosphorylation of PIP_{2} to PIP_{3} activates AKT, which has numerous downstream signalling targets, related to cellular processes. Additionally, mTOR can act both upstream and downstream of AKT. Two multiprotein complexes of mTOR are involved in the PAM pathway, mTORC1 and mTORC2 which both regulate protein synthesis required for cell growth, angiogenesis, and proliferation. mTORC2 stimulates AKT activity, which in turn amplifies activity of mTORC1 by suppressing mTORC1 inhibitors. BCR::ABL1 activation of the PAM pathway may additionally also occur by binding of two proteins, Crkl and c-Cbl, to the ABL fragment of the fusion oncoprotein. The BCR::ABL1 kinase protein will phosphorylate c-Cbl which will activate PI3K.

=== JAK-STAT pathway ===
The JAK-STAT pathway is an evolutionary conserved signalling pathway involved over 50 cytokines and growth factors are associated with this pathway. Playing an important role in haematopoiesis, differentiation, immune modulation and apoptosis. In healthy cells, JAK proteins naturally phosphorylate each other, prompting a STAT protein to bind to the JAK tyrosine phosphorylated domain. The STAT protein is in turn itself phosphorylated by JAK. STAT is separated from JAK, followed by a translocation of STAT from the cytosol to the nucleus. In the nucleus STAT will induce transcriptional activation of specific genes and other downstream targets. JAK2, STAT1, STAT3 and STAT5 have been shown to be constitutively active in CML models. Where JAK2 and STAT5 being the main components, where BCR::ABL1 enhances the JAK2-STAT5 pathway to enable oncogenic transformation. JAK2 has been shown to phosphorylate the Y177 domain on the BCR::ABL1 oncoprotein, which increases protein stability. JAK2 induces expression of the oncogene c-MYC, which is overexpressed in BCR::ABL1 positive cells, and is a downstream target for activated JAK2 proteins in these cells. STAT 5 is crucial for development and survival of lymphoid leukemia cells, by regulating transcription of anti-apoptotic BCL proteins. c-MYC additionally enables the transactivation of the survivin promoter via JAK2-PI3K pathways, indicating a complex connection between these pathways. STAT5 is not essential for normal haematopoiesis, making it a good therapeutic target in ph+ leukemias.

=== PP2A tumour suppressor gene –β-catenin pathway ===
PP2A is a tumour-suppressor gene which constitutes 0,2% to 1% of total proteins found in mammalian cells, tasked with numerous processes, such as signal transduction, DNA replication, protein translation, regulating cell proliferation, cell cycle progression and differentiation. Studies have shown that in patients with the BCR::ABL1 translocation, BCR::ABL1 fusion protein promotes loss of PP2A function; effectively turning off the tumour suppressor gene. The mechanism for this pathway, involving BCR::ABL1, is complex, involving both the JAK/STAT pathway, and the Wnt/β-catenin pathway. The BCR::ABL1 tyrosine kinase will promote activation of JAK2, which in turn enhances β-catenin activity. β-catenin, a part of the Wnt/ β-catenin pathway associated with cancers unrelated directly to BCR::ABL1, induces inactivation of PP2A via a protein called SET (also known as Inhibitor-2 of PP2A). SET acts as a potent inhibitor of PP2A, turning off PP2A's tumour suppressive activity. Counterintuitively, inhibition of PP2A has been shown to sensitize TKI-resistant cancer cells, making PP2A a target for therapies.

=== Apoptosis ===
Programmed cell death, apoptosis, is controlled by several different mechanisms and pathways involving many enzymes and proteins. Disruption of these mechanisms can lead to loss of apoptotic function in a damaged cell, a hallmark characteristic of cancers. BCR::ABL1 encoded tyrosine kinase can impact both pro-apoptotic and anti-apoptotic proteins via different pathways. An important pro apoptotic is the p53 tumour suppressor, which reacts to DNA damage by inducing apoptosis. Related to p53 is p73, which encodes for multiple proteins through alternative splicing, and has a similar function to p53. Chemotherapeutic chemical cisplatin increases p73 levels in the cell, additionally cisplatin activates c-Abl tyrosine kinase, which enhances the pro-apoptotic ability of p73. c-Abl is activated by DNA damage, and regulates p73 through a c-Abl mechanism. BCR::ABL1 induces and MDM2 mRNA translation via a RNA binding protein. MDM2 negatively regulates p53 and p73 activity by targeting them for ubiquitination, a post translational process that recruits proteins to the proteasomes where they are degraded and recycled. Many chemotherapies are based on creating DNA damage to induce natural apoptosis, cancer cells with BCR::ABL1 are therefore more resistant to these chemotherapies. Other main pathway for apoptosis resistance in BCR::ABL1 positive cancer cells is through the Bcl2 family of apoptotic regulatory proteins. BAD is a pro-apoptotic member of said protein family, when BAD is nonphosphorylated, it binds to the anti-apoptotic Bcl-X_{L} and Bcl-2, promoting cell death. AKT and PI3K can phosphorylate BAD, preventing it from inhibiting anti-apoptotic Bcl-X_{L} and Bcl-2, preventing cell death. AKT can also increase NF-κB activity by accelerating degradation of its inhibitor IκBα. This causes elevated Bcl-X_{L} expression. The STAT5 pathway can also be involved, STAT5 can bind to the Bcl-x promoter, which increases expression of Bcl-X_{L} further reinforcing resistance to apoptosis. Another pro-apoptotic is BAX, which plays a central role in mitochondria dependent apoptosis, is usually regulated by p53. In BCR::ABL1 patients p53 is usually heavily downregulated, resulting in low to no activation of BAX. It is theorised that TKI activity can be enhanced by inhibition of Bcl-2, as Bcl-2 normally prevents apoptosis by binding and inhibiting BAD and BAX. All of these mechanisms attribute to the cell survival and drug resistance which is so characteristic for CML and ALL.

== Nomenclature ==
The Philadelphia chromosome is designated Ph (or Ph') chromosome and designates the shortened chromosome 22 which encodes the BCR::ABL1 fusion gene/protein kinase. It arises from the translocation, denoted t(9;22)(q34.1;q11.2), between chromosome 9 and chromosome 22, with breaks happening in region (3), band (4), sub-band (1) of the long arm (q) of chromosome 9 and region (1), band (1), sub-band (2) of the long arm (q) of chromosome 22. Hence the chromosome breakpoints are written as (9q34.1) and (22q11.2), respectively, under the International System for Human Cytogenomic Nomenclature.

Cells positive for the Ph chromosome are called Ph^{+}. Some other cancers display similar gene expression patterns as Ph^{+} and they are called "Ph-like".

== Therapy ==
The primary objective of Ph+ CML and ALL treatment is to improve survival rates to match the general population. A secondary objective, although achieved in fewer patients, is a deep molecular response (DMR), which can allow treatment discontinuation and lead to a treatment-free remission.

The main treatment options for Ph+ leukemias are Tyrosine kinase inhibitors (TKIs), chemotherapy, often in combination with TKIs, and allogeneic treatments such as stem cell transplantation (HSCT). Chemotherapy is often used before stem cell transplantation in high-risk patients. HSCT is used for younger or high-risk patients who don't respond well to TKIs.

=== Tyrosine kinase inhibitors (TKIs) ===
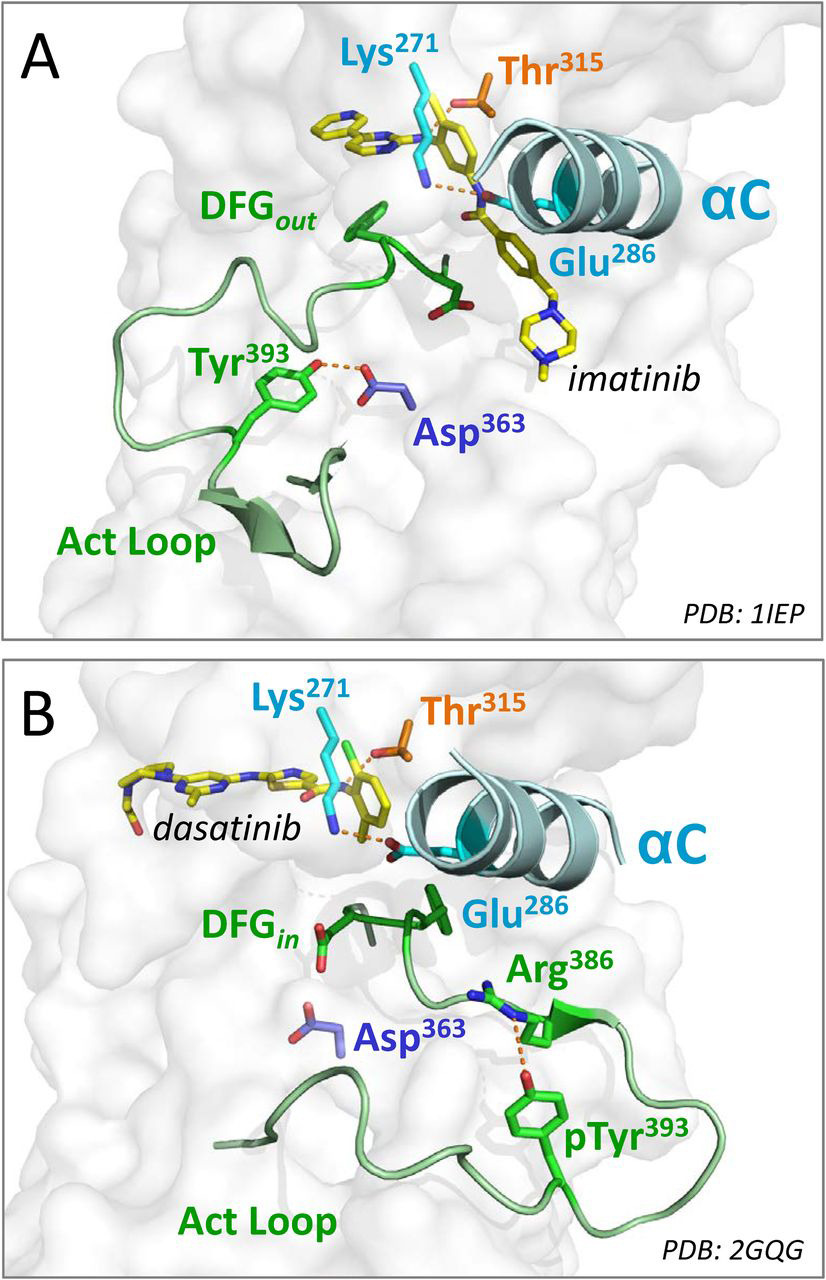
Structural features of the Abl kinase domain important for activity and inhibitor binding. A) first generation TKI imatinib, B) second generation TKI dasatinib

The BCR-ABL fusion gene produces an abnormal tyrosine kinase that drives Ph+ leukemia. TKIs target the BRC-ABL1 fusion protein and block the abnormal tyrosine kinase activity, preventing uncontrolled cell proliferation. The first TKI (imatinib) was approved in the US in 2001; since then, 5 additional BCR::ABL1 TKIs have been approved by the US food and drug administration (FDA). The TKIs are categorized in generations pertaining to potency, whereas each subsequent generation is effective to mutations with resistance to the previous generation.

Table 3. FDA approved BCR::ABL1 TKIs categorized by generation
BCR::ABL1 TKI	Generation
Imatinib	First-generation
Dasatinib, Nilotinib, Bosutinib	Second-generation
Ponatinib, Asciminib	Third-generation

The introduction of TKIs was initially alongside chemotherapy. Prior to TKIs, chemotherapy had been the standard treatment for Ph-positive leukemia with limited success and low long-term survival rates. The combination improved survival rates resulted in more patients achieving hematologic remission, where leukemia cells can no longer be detected in the blood. However, this approach had significant side effects, with some patients dying from complications during early phases of treatment. Further research explored the use of TKIs with reduced-intensity chemotherapy and since 2004, clinical trials in Italy have used TKIs without chemotherapy during the first phase of treatment. This approach led to higher remission rates, fewer complications and eligibility for elderly patients unable to tolerate intense chemotherapy. Tyrosine kinase inhibitors are now a standard first line therapy for Ph positive ALL and CML. ALL was once the deadliest hematologic cancer, but since the introduction of TKIs in the early 2000s, long term survival is greater than 60% and TKIs are associated with 94-100% complete response rates and 30-40% molecular response rates. TKIs are usually used with a low dose of chemotherapy for induction therapy for Ph positive ALL, but clinical trials have shown that long term remission can be achieved with TKIs alone, sparing the person potentially toxic chemotherapy. Blinatumomab a CD19 monoclonal antibody (with CD19 present on B-lineage ALL cells) may be used in relapsed or refractory Ph positive ALL. Blinatumomab activates CD19 on T cells and activates them to attack leukemic B cells. When combined with TKIs it is associated with greater hematologic response and greater survival; an overall survival of 95% at 18 months and 88% disease free survival.

=== Allogeneic transplantation and immunotherapy ===
Based on the patient's condition and response to TKIs, other treatment options such as Allogeneic Stem Cell Transplantation (HSCT) or immunotherapy. HSCT is primarily considered for younger patients or high-risk patients that do not respond well to TKIs. The process involves transplanting bone marrow stem cells from a matched donor and is infrequently used to treat CML due to long-term complications and risk factors. Traditionally Allogeneic transplantation has been the standard curative treatment for Ph+ leukemia however, studies suggest it may not improve survival in patients without minimal residual disease (MRD). Immunotherapies are often considered in MRD cases or in instances of relapsed patients. Third generation, more potent TKIs and immunotherapies, may lead to fewer patients requiring transplantation as standard treatment. For patients with persistent MRD, TKI resistant mutations or multiple relapses, HSCT should be considered. Depending on the stage of CML, cure rates with HSCT range from 20% to 60%. Improved techniques have reduced relapse free mortality rates after transplant to ~12% after 5 years and has made HSCT feasible for older patients. Post-transplant, TKI maintenance therapy is recommended.

== Prognosis ==
The introduction of BCR::ABL1 targeting TKIs significantly improved Ph+ CML prognosis. TKIs have increased the 10-year overall survival rate from less than 20% to 80%-85%. This has resulted in a similar 10-year relative survival rate for patients with CML and age-matched CML negative controls.

== History ==
The Philadelphia chromosome was co-discovered in 1960 by David Hungerford and Peter Nowell, cytogeneticists at the University of Pennsylvania School of Medicine. Through an accident, Nowell managed to clearly see metaphase spreads in leukemic cells, and he and Hungerford subsequently described an unusual, small chromosome present in leukocytes from patients with CML. This finding provided strong evidence supporting Boveri's hypothesis that a single genetic alteration could drive cancer development. While no other consistent chromosomal abnormalities were initially found in leukemias, the discovery of the Philadelphia chromosome marked a breakthrough in understanding cancer genetics.

The mechanism for which the Philadelphia chromosome arises as a translocation, not a deletion was discovered by Janet Rowley in 1972, and subsequent paper was published in 1973. Rowley used Giemsa staining and quinacrine banding to show that the Ph chromosome resulted from a translocation between chromosomes 9 and 22. The presence of the t(9;22) translocation in nearly all bone marrow cells from CML patients implied that the abnormality was involved as a cause and not a result of the cancer.

In 1984, Nora Heisterkamp and John Groffen later mapped the breakpoints on chromosomes 9 and 22, identifying the BCR on chromosome 22 and its fusion with the ABL gene from chromosome 9. Owen Witte's work demonstrated that the abnormal tyrosine kinase produced by BRC-ABL fusion gene had enhanced kinase activity. Experiments introducing the BCR-ABL gene in mice led to CML-like disease, proving its central role in leukemia development.

== Notes ==
Many of the sources used in this article refer to different statistics. For example, frequencies of the P190, P210 and P230 oncoproteins in CML and ph+ B-ALL. In this article, the % frequencies were set at an average value based on information from different sources. This discrepancy can probably be attributed to the fact that the review articles used here were based on different studies where frequencies were determined from populations used in the study. Random variations in detected frequency could therefore be to blame for this discrepancy.

Apart from the RAS-RAF, PI3K-AKT and JAK/STAT pathways, a certain source mentioned an additional pathway, the WNT/β-Catenin Pathway, that could also be involved in BCR::ABL1 related cancers. This was however excluded from this article, with exception to its part in the PP2A, due to a lack of good sources supporting this.

== See also ==
- Chronic myelogenous leukemia
- Acute lymphocytic leukemia
