= Chronic myelogenous leukemia =

Type of blood cancer

- Other names: Chronic myeloid leukemia, chronic granulocytic leukemia (CGL)
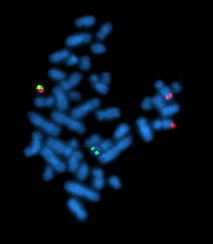
- The Philadelphia chromosome as seen by fluorescent in situ hybridization (FISH).
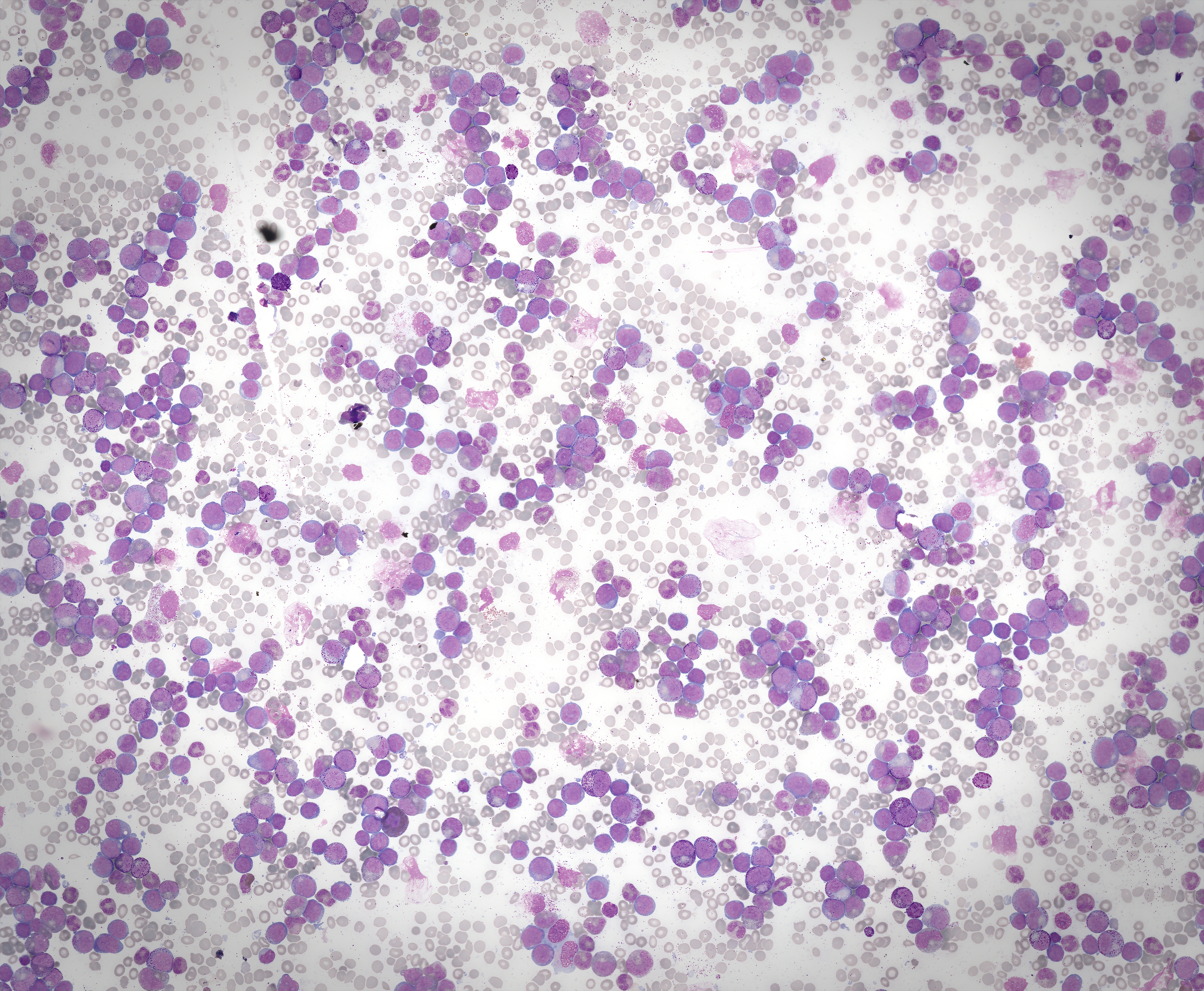
- Bone marrow smear in chronic myeloid leukemia (blast phase): marked leukocytosis with a shift of granulocytes to young forms; approx. 40% blast cells
- Specialty: Haematology and oncology
- Frequency: 298,000 (2015)
- Deaths: 32,200 (2015)

Chronic myelogenous leukemia (CML), also known as chronic myeloid leukemia, is a cancer of the white blood cells. It is a form of leukemia characterized by the increased and unregulated growth of myeloid cells in the bone marrow and the accumulation of these cells in the blood. CML is a clonal bone marrow stem cell disorder in which a proliferation of mature granulocytes (neutrophils, eosinophils, and basophils) and their precursors is found; a characteristic increase in basophils is clinically relevant. It is a type of myeloproliferative neoplasm associated with a characteristic chromosomal translocation called the Philadelphia chromosome.

CML is largely treated with targeted drugs called tyrosine-kinase inhibitors (TKIs), which have led to dramatically improved long-term survival rates since 2001. These drugs have revolutionized the treatment of this disease and allow most patients to have a good quality of life when compared to the former chemotherapy drugs. In Western countries, CML accounts for 15–25% of all adult leukemias and 14% of leukemias overall (including the pediatric population, where CML is less common).

== Signs and symptoms ==
The way CML presents depends on the stage of the disease at diagnosis, as it has been known to skip stages in some cases.

Most patients (~90%) are diagnosed during the chronic stage, which is most often asymptomatic. In these cases, it may be diagnosed incidentally with an elevated white blood cell count on a routine laboratory test. It can also present with symptoms indicative of hepatosplenomegaly and the resulting left upper quadrant pain caused by splenomegaly. The enlarged spleen may put pressure on the stomach, causing a loss of appetite and resulting in weight loss. It may also present with mild fever and night sweats due to an elevated basal metabolism level.

Some (<10%) are diagnosed during the accelerated stage, which most often presents bleeding, petechiae, and ecchymosis. In these patients, fevers are most commonly the result of opportunistic infections.

Some patients are initially diagnosed in the blast phase, in which the symptoms are most likely fever, bone pain, and an increase in bone marrow fibrosis.

== Cause ==
In most cases, no obvious cause for CML can be isolated.

=== Risk factors ===
CML is slightly more common in males than in females (male-to-female ratio of 1.4:1) and appears more often in the elderly with a median age at diagnosis of 65 years. Exposure to ionising radiation appears to be a risk factor, based on a 50 fold higher incidence of CML in Hiroshima and Nagasaki nuclear bombing survivors. The rate of CML in these individuals seems to peak about 10 years after the exposure.

== Pathophysiology ==
Diagram showing the translocation found in the Philadelphia chromosome

CML was the first cancer to be linked to a clear genetic abnormality, the chromosomal translocation known as the Philadelphia chromosome. This chromosomal abnormality is so named because it was first discovered and described in 1960 by two scientists from Philadelphia, Pennsylvania, US: Peter Nowell of the University of Pennsylvania and David Hungerford of Fox Chase Cancer Center.

In this translocation, parts of two chromosomes (the 9th and 22nd) switch places. As a result, part of the BCR ("breakpoint cluster region") gene from chromosome 22 is fused with the ABL gene on chromosome 9. This abnormal "fusion" gene generates a protein of p210 or sometimes p185 weight (p210 is short for 210 kDa protein, a shorthand used for characterizing proteins based solely on size). Because ABL carries a domain that can add phosphate groups to tyrosine residues (a tyrosine kinase), the BCR-ABL fusion gene product is also a tyrosine kinase.

Diagram showing the cells CML can develop from

The fused BCR-ABL protein interacts with the interleukin 3beta(c) receptor subunit. The BCR-ABL transcript is continuously active and does not require activation by other cellular messaging proteins. In turn, BCR-ABL activates a cascade of proteins that control the cell cycle, speeding up cell division. Moreover, the BCR-ABL protein inhibits DNA repair, causing genomic instability and making the cell more susceptible to developing further genetic abnormalities. The action of the BCR-ABL protein is the pathophysiologic cause of chronic myelogenous leukemia. With improved understanding of the nature of the BCR-ABL protein and its action as a tyrosine kinase, targeted therapies (the first of which was imatinib) that specifically inhibit the activity of the BCR-ABL protein have been developed. These tyrosine kinase inhibitors can induce complete remissions in CML, confirming the central importance of BCR-ABL as the cause of CML.

== Diagnosis ==
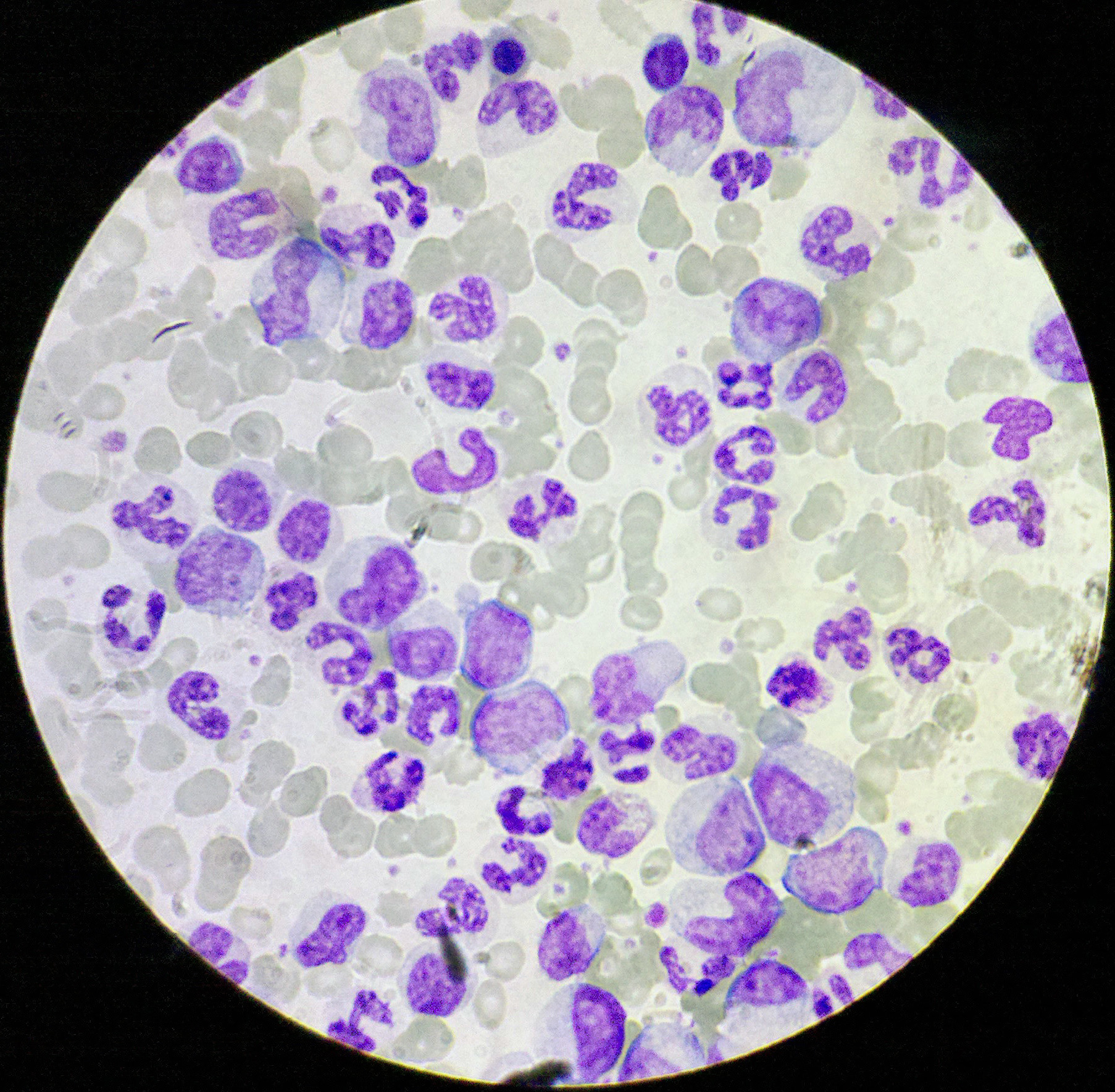
Chronic myeloid leukemia in a 4 years old female. Peripheral blood (MGG stain)

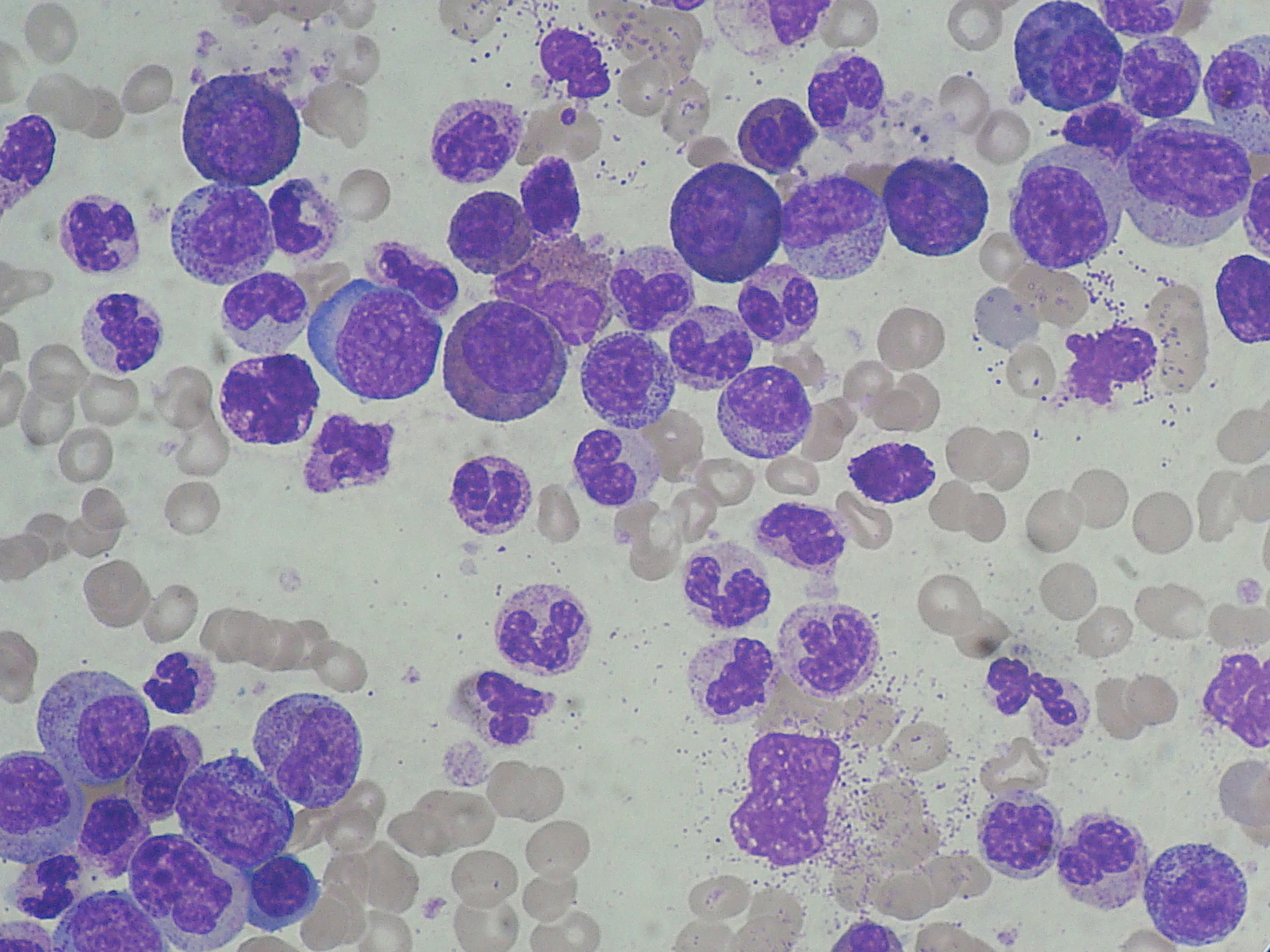
Peripheral blood (MGG stain): marked leukocytosis with granulocyte left shift

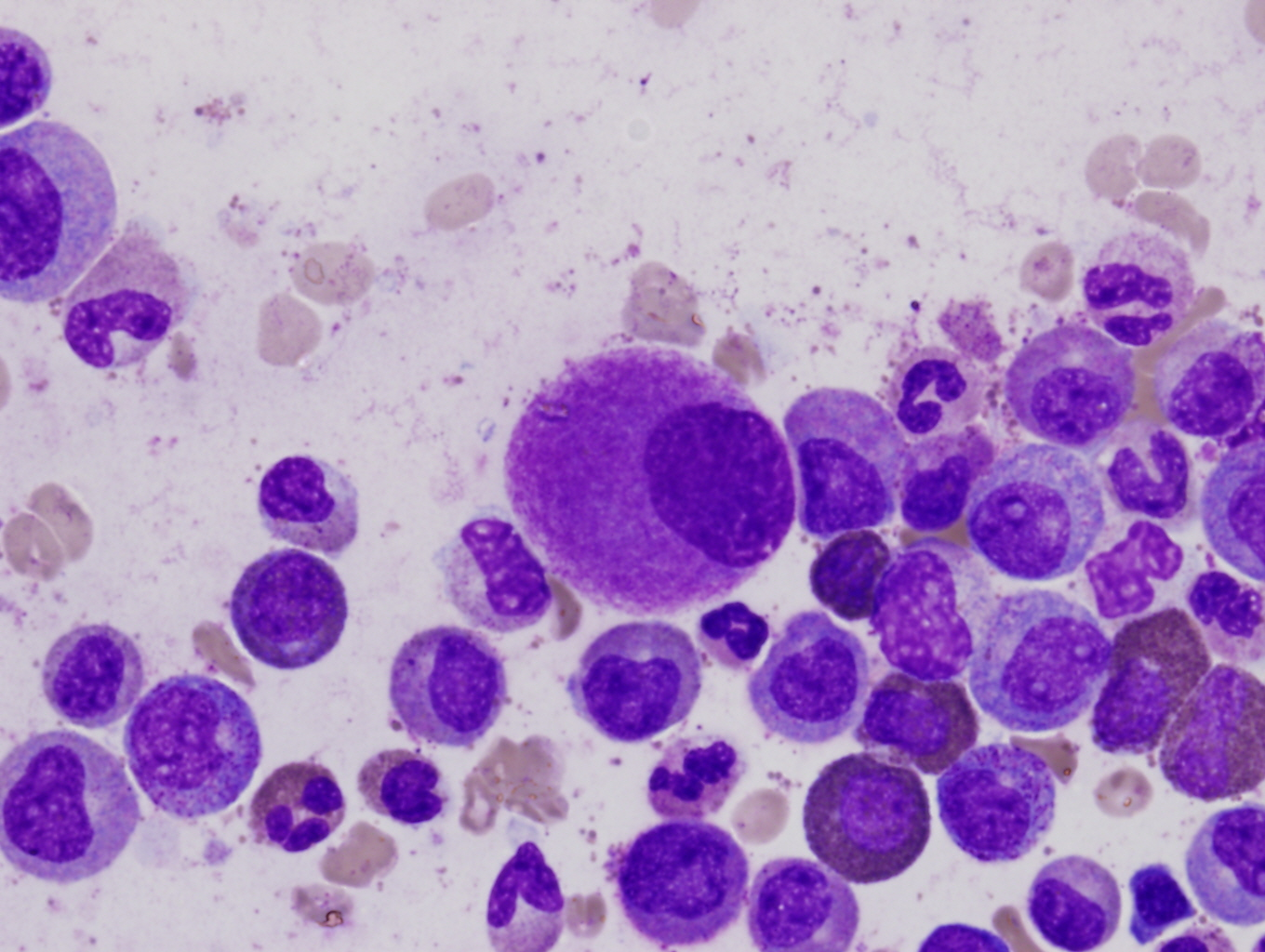
A small, hypolobated megakaryocyte (center of field) in a bone marrow aspirate, characteristic of chronic myeloid leukemia.

CML is often suspected based on a complete blood count, which shows increased granulocytes of all types, typically including mature myeloid cells. Basophils and eosinophils are almost universally increased; this feature may help differentiate CML from a leukemoid reaction. A bone marrow biopsy is often performed as part of the evaluation for CML, and CML is diagnosed by cytogenetics that detects the translocation t(9;22)(q34;q11.2) which involves the ABL1 gene in chromosome 9 and the BCR gene in chromosome 22. As a result of this translocation, the chromosome looks smaller than its homologue chromosome; this appearance is known as the Philadelphia chromosome chromosomal abnormality. Thus, this abnormality can be detected by routine cytogenetics, and the involved genes BCR-ABL1 can be detected by fluorescent in situ hybridization, as well as by PCR.

Controversy exists over so-called Ph-negative CML, or cases of suspected CML in which the Philadelphia chromosome cannot be detected. Many such patients, in fact, have complex chromosomal abnormalities that mask the (9;22) translocation, or have evidence of the translocation by FISH or RT-PCR despite normal routine karyotyping. The small subset of patients without detectable molecular evidence of BCR-ABL1 fusion may be better classified as having an undifferentiated myelodysplastic/myeloproliferative disorder, as their clinical course tends to be different from patients with CML.

CML must be distinguished from a leukemoid reaction, which can have a similar appearance on a blood smear.

=== Classification ===
CML is often divided into three phases based on clinical characteristics and laboratory findings. In the absence of intervention, CML typically begins in the chronic phase, and over several years progresses to an accelerated phase and ultimately to a blast crisis. Blast crisis is the terminal phase of CML and clinically behaves like an acute leukemia. Drug treatment will usually stop this progression if early. One of the drivers of the progression from chronic phase through acceleration and blast crisis is the acquisition of new chromosomal abnormalities (in addition to the Philadelphia chromosome). Some patients may already be in the accelerated phase or blast crisis by the time they are diagnosed.

==== Chronic phase ====
Approximately 85% of patients with CML are in the chronic phase at the time of diagnosis. During this phase, patients are usually asymptomatic or have only mild symptoms of fatigue, left side pain, joint and/or hip pain, or abdominal fullness. The duration of the chronic phase is variable and depends on how early the disease was diagnosed as well as the therapies used. In the absence of treatment, the disease progresses to an accelerated phase. Precise patient staging based on clinical markers and personal genomic profile will likely prove beneficial in the assessment of disease history with respect to progression risk.

==== Accelerated phase ====
Criteria for diagnosing transition into the accelerated phase are somewhat variable; the most widely used criteria are those proposed by investigators at M.D. Anderson Cancer Center, by Sokal et al., and the World Health Organization. The WHO criteria are perhaps most widely used, and define the accelerated phase by the presence of ≥1 of the following haematological/cytogenetic criteria or provisional criteria concerning response to tyrosine kinase inhibitor (TKI) therapy

- Haematological/cytogenetic criteria
  - Persistent or increasing high white blood cell count (> 10 billion/L), unresponsive to therapy
  - Persistent or increasing splenomegaly, unresponsive to therapy
  - Persistent thrombocytosis (> 1000 billion/L), unresponsive to therapy
  - Persistent thrombocytopenia (< 100 billion/L), unrelated to therapy
  - ≥ 20% basophils in the peripheral blood
  - 10–19% blasts in the peripheral blood and/or bone marrow
  - Additional clonal chromosomal abnormalities in Philadelphia (Ph) chromosome-positive (Ph+) cells at diagnosis, including so-called major route abnormalities (a second Ph chromosome, trisomy 8, isochromosome 17q, trisomy 19), complex karyotype, and abnormalities of 3q26.2
  - Any new clonal chromosomal abnormality in Ph+ cells that occurs during therapy
- Provisional response-to-TKI criteria
  - Haematological resistance (or failure to achieve a complete haematological response d) to the first TKI
  - Any haematological, cytogenetic, or molecular indications of resistance to two sequential TKIs
  - Occurrence of two or more mutations in the BCR-ABL1 fusion gene during TKI therapy

The patient is considered to be in the accelerated phase if any of the above are present. The accelerated phase is significant because it signals that the disease is progressing and transformation to blast crisis is imminent. Drug treatment often becomes less effective in the advanced stages.

==== Blast crisis ====
Blast crisis is the final phase in the evolution of CML, and behaves like an acute leukemia, with rapid progression and short survival. Blast crisis is diagnosed if any of the following are present in a patient with CML:

- >20% blasts in the blood or bone marrow
- The presence of an extramedullary proliferation of blasts

== Treatment ==
The only curative treatment for CML is a bone marrow transplant or an allogeneic stem cell transplant. Other than this there are four major mainstays of treatment in CML: treatment with tyrosine kinase inhibitors, myelosuppressive or leukapheresis therapy (to counteract the leukocytosis during early treatment), splenectomy and interferon alfa-2b treatment. Due to the high median age of patients with CML, it is relatively rare for CML to be seen in pregnant women; however, chronic myelogenous leukemia can be treated with relative safety at any time during pregnancy with the cytokine interferon-alpha.

=== Chronic phase ===
In the past, antimetabolites (e.g., cytarabine, hydroxyurea), alkylating agents, interferon alfa 2b, and steroids were used as treatments of CML in the chronic phase, but since the 2000s have been replaced by Bcr-Abl tyrosine-kinase inhibitors drugs that specifically target BCR-ABL, the constitutively activated tyrosine kinase fusion protein caused by the Philadelphia chromosome translocation. Despite the move to replace cytotoxic antineoplastics (standard anticancer drugs) with tyrosine kinase inhibitors, sometimes hydroxyurea is still used to counteract the high leukocyte counts encountered during treatment with tyrosine kinase inhibitors like imatinib; in these situations, it may be the preferred myelosuppressive agent due to its relative lack of leukemogenic effects and hence the relative lack of potential for secondary haematologic malignancies to result from treatment. IRIS, an international study that compared interferon/cytarabine combination and the first of these new drugs imatinib, with long-term follow up, demonstrated the clear superiority of tyrosine-kinase-targeted inhibition over existing treatments.

==== Imatinib ====
The first of this new class of drugs was imatinib mesylate (marketed as Gleevec or Glivec), approved by the US Food and Drug Administration (FDA) in 2001. Imatinib was found to inhibit the progression of CML in the majority of patients (65–75%) sufficiently to achieve regrowth of their normal bone marrow stem cell population (a cytogenetic response) with stable proportions of maturing white blood cells. Because some leukemic cells (as evaluated by RT-PCR) persist in nearly all patients, the treatment has to be continued indefinitely. Since the advent of imatinib, CML has become the first cancer in which a standard medical treatment may give the patient a normal life expectancy.

==== Dasatinib, nilotinib, radotinib, bosutinib, and asciminib ====
To overcome imatinib resistance and to increase responsiveness to TK inhibitors, four novel agents were later developed. The first, dasatinib, blocks several further oncogenic proteins, in addition to more potent inhibition of the BCR-ABL protein, and was approved in 2007 by the U.S. Food and Drug Administration (FDA) to treat CML in people who were either resistant to or intolerant of imatinib. A second TK inhibitor, nilotinib, was approved by the FDA for the same indication. In 2010, nilotinib and dasatinib were also approved for first-line therapy, making three drugs in this class available for the treatment of newly diagnosed CML. In 2012, radotinib joined the class of novel agents in the inhibition of the BCR-ABL protein and was approved in South Korea for people resistant to or intolerant of imatinib. Bosutinib received US FDA and EU European Medicines Agency approval on 4 September 2012 and 27 March 2013, respectively, for the treatment of adults with Philadelphia chromosome-positive (Ph+) chronic myelogenous leukemia (CML) with resistance or intolerance to prior therapy.

Asciminib (Scemblix) was approved for medical use in the United States in October 2021.

==== Treatment-resistant CML ====
While capable of producing significantly improved responses compared with the action of imatinib, neither dasatinib nor nilotinib could overcome drug resistance caused by one particular mutation found to occur in the structure of BCR-ABL1 known as the T315I mutation (in other words, where the 315th amino acid is mutated from a threonine residue to an isoleucine residue). Two approaches were developed for the treatment of CML as a result:

In 2007, Chemgenex released results of an open-label Phase 2/3 study (CGX-635-CML-202) that investigated the use of a non BCR-ABL targeted agent omacetaxine, administered subcutaneously (under the skin) in patients who had failed with imatinib and exhibited T315I kinase domain mutation. This is a study which is ongoing through 2014. In September 2012, the FDA approved omacetaxine for the treatment of CML in the case of resistance to other chemotherapeutic agents.

Independently, ARIAD Pharmaceuticals, adapting the chemical structures from first and second-generation TK inhibitors, arrived at a new pan-BCR-ABL1 inhibitor which showed (for the first time) efficacy against T315I, as well as all other known mutations of the oncoprotein. The drug, ponatinib, gained FDA approval in December 2012 for the treatment of patients with resistant or intolerant CML. Just as with second-generation TK inhibitors, early approval is being sought to also extend the use of ponatinib to newly diagnosed CML patients.

In October 2021, the Food and Drug Administration approved asciminib (Scemblix), the first TK inhibitor specifically targeting the ABL1 myristoyl pocket (STAMP) via allosteric binding, as a third-line option for patients with chronic-phase CML.

=== Vaccination ===
In 2005, encouraging but mixed results of vaccination were reported with the BCR/ABL1 p210 fusion protein in patients with stable disease, with GM-CSF as an adjuvant.

== Prognosis ==
Before the advent of tyrosine kinase inhibitors, the median survival time for CML patients had been about 3–5 years from the time of diagnosis. In the United States, 70% of people survive five years or more after diagnosis (2015–2021).

== Epidemiology ==
=== United Kingdom ===
CML accounts for 8% of all leukaemias in the UK, and around 680 people were diagnosed with the disease in 2011.

=== United States ===
The American Cancer Society estimates that in 2025, about 9,560 new cases of chronic myeloid leukemia will be diagnosed, and about 1,290 people will die of the disease. This means that about 15% of all newly diagnosed leukemia cases will be chronic myeloid leukemia. The average risk of a person getting this disease is 1 in 526. The disease is more common in men than women, and more common in whites than African-Americans. The average age at diagnosis is 64 years, and this disease is rarely seen in children.
