= Src inhibitor =

Chemical structure of tirbanibulin

Src inhibitor is a class of inhibitors that targets the Src kinase family of tyrosine kinase, which is transcribed by the Src proto-oncogene (short for "sarcoma gene") that potentially induce malignant transformations of certain cells. Because of the crucial position of the Src kinase in cells, Src inhibitors are potential antineoplastic agents for e.g. pancreatic cancer, breast cancer and stomach cancer

== Examples ==
- Tirbanibulin is an oral src inhibitor and the first clinical inhibitor with GI50 of 9–60 nM in cancer cell lines.
- Bosutinib has been developed for the treatment of chronic myelogenous leukemia by Pfizer.
- Saracatinib, the first Src inhibitor to show inhibition of the Src pathway in human tumor tissue, has anti-tumor activity alone or in combination with chemotherapeutic agents.

Chemical structure of PP1

- PP1, PP2 (kinase inhibitor) are both inhibitors of Lck and FynT.
- Dasatinib
