= Proto-oncogene tyrosine-protein kinase Src =

Mammalian protein found in humans

SRC

Identifiers
- Aliases: SRC, ASV, SRC1, c-p60-Src, SRC proto-oncogene, non-receptor tyrosine kinase, THC6
- External IDs: OMIM: 190090; MGI: 98397; GeneCards: SRC
Available structures
PDB	Ortholog search: PDBe RCSB
PDB	List of PDB id codes 1A07, 1A08, 1A09, 1A1A, 1A1B, 1A1C, 1A1E, 1FMK, 1HCS, 1HCT, 1KSW, 1O41, 1O42, 1O43, 1O44, 1O45, 1O46, 1O47, 1O48, 1O49, 1O4A, 1O4B, 1O4C, 1O4D, 1O4E, 1O4F, 1O4G, 1O4H, 1O4I, 1O4J, 1O4K, 1O4L, 1O4M, 1O4N, 1O4O, 1O4P, 1O4Q, 1O4R, 1SHD, 1Y57, 1YI6, 1YOJ, 1YOL, 1YOM, 2BDF, 2H8H, 3VRO, 3ZMP, 3ZMQ, 4F59, 4F5A, 4F5B, 4HXJ, 4K11, 4MXO, 4MXX, 4MXY, 4MXZ
Enzyme activity
EC #	BRENDA	ExPASy	KEGG	MetaCyc
2.7.10.2	↗	↗	↗	↗

Gene location (Human)
Chr.	Chromosome 20 (human)
Band	20q11.23	Start	37,344,685 bp
Band	20q11.23	End	37,406,050 bp

Gene location (Mouse)
Chr.	Chromosome 2 (mouse)
Band	2 H1|2 78.35 cM	Start	157,418,444 bp
Band	2 H1|2 78.35 cM	End	157,471,862 bp
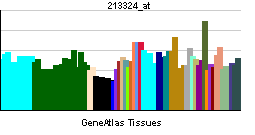

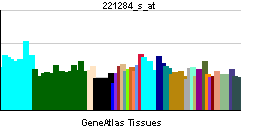
RNA expression pattern
Bgee	Human / Mouse (ortholog); Top expressed in: body of stomach; gallbladder; rectum; body of pancreas; transverse colon; ganglionic eminence; ectocervix; body of uterus; muscle layer of sigmoid colon; mucosa of transverse colon / Top expressed in: dentate gyrus of hippocampal formation granule cell; external carotid artery; superior frontal gyrus; primary visual cortex; internal carotid artery; ventricular zone; molar; aortic valve; ascending aorta; jejunum; More reference expression data
BioGPS	More reference expression data
Gene ontology
Molecular function	transmembrane transporter binding; protein domain specific binding; protein-containing complex binding; SH2 domain binding; kinase activity; signaling receptor binding; estrogen receptor binding; ATP binding; protein kinase activity; insulin receptor binding; non-membrane spanning protein tyrosine kinase activity; kinase binding; heme binding; enzyme binding; transferase activity; ephrin receptor binding; scaffold protein binding; integrin binding; protein binding; protein kinase binding; cell adhesion molecule binding; protein kinase C binding; hormone receptor binding; nucleotide binding; growth factor receptor binding; phosphoprotein binding; protein tyrosine kinase activity; protein C-terminus binding; ubiquitin protein ligase binding; cadherin binding; connexin binding; phosphatidylinositol-4,5-bisphosphate 3-kinase activity
Cellular component	cytoplasm; cytosol; membrane; extrinsic component of cytoplasmic side of plasma membrane; ruffle membrane; mitochondrion; perinuclear region of cytoplasm; caveola; neuron projection; cytoskeleton; nucleus; lysosome; extracellular exosome; late endosome; plasma membrane; actin filament; postsynaptic density; mitochondrial inner membrane; podosome; nucleoplasm; glutamatergic synapse; postsynaptic specialization, intracellular component
Biological process	response to mineralocorticoid; negative regulation of telomere maintenance via telomerase; response to interleukin-1; positive regulation of MAP kinase activity; positive regulation of canonical Wnt signaling pathway; negative regulation of telomerase activity; cellular response to progesterone stimulus; regulation of intracellular estrogen receptor signaling pathway; stress fiber assembly; positive regulation of protein serine/threonine kinase activity; platelet activation; positive regulation of smooth muscle cell migration; protein phosphorylation; regulation of vascular permeability; vascular endothelial growth factor receptor signaling pathway; positive regulation of ERK1 and ERK2 cascade; regulation of podosome assembly; cell cycle; substrate adhesion-dependent cell spreading; osteoclast development; cell population proliferation; transforming growth factor beta receptor signaling pathway; cellular response to hypoxia; cellular response to transforming growth factor beta stimulus; negative regulation of protein homooligomerization; positive regulation of protein kinase B signaling; positive regulation of lamellipodium morphogenesis; epidermal growth factor receptor signaling pathway; branching involved in mammary gland duct morphogenesis; Fc-gamma receptor signaling pathway involved in phagocytosis; negative regulation of intrinsic apoptotic signaling pathway; negative regulation of extrinsic apoptotic signaling pathway; response to mechanical stimulus; response to virus; positive regulation of epithelial cell migration; signal complex assembly; stimulatory C-type lectin receptor signaling pathway; positive regulation of platelet-derived growth factor receptor signaling pathway; oogenesis; positive regulation of transcription, DNA-templated; regulation of epithelial cell migration; response to nutrient levels; positive regulation of DNA biosynthetic process; cellular response to insulin stimulus; protein autophosphorylation; viral process; negative regulation of focal adhesion assembly; response to acidic pH; response to fatty acid; regulation of cell projection assembly; phosphorylation; immune system process; negative regulation of mitochondrial depolarization; positive regulation of integrin activation; negative regulation of apoptotic process; cellular response to platelet-derived growth factor stimulus; positive regulation of podosome assembly; positive regulation of glucose metabolic process; transcytosis; cellular response to fluid shear stress; response to electrical stimulus; positive regulation of protein transport; uterus development; protein destabilization; regulation of cell-cell adhesion; peptidyl-tyrosine autophosphorylation; integrin-mediated signaling pathway; positive regulation of insulin receptor signaling pathway; progesterone receptor signaling pathway; negative regulation of transcription, DNA-templated; adherens junction organization; negative regulation of anoikis; response to hydrogen peroxide; leukocyte migration; activation of protein kinase B activity; negative regulation of cysteine-type endopeptidase activity involved in apoptotic process; intracellular signal transduction; regulation of early endosome to late endosome transport; ephrin receptor signaling pathway; T cell costimulation; positive regulation of intracellular signal transduction; regulation of caveolin-mediated endocytosis; regulation of cell cycle; positive regulation of phosphatidylinositol 3-kinase activity; cellular response to reactive oxygen species; cellular response to peptide hormone stimulus; positive regulation of gene expression; cellular response to fatty acid; regulation of cell population proliferation; angiotensin-activated signaling pathway involved in heart process; peptidyl-serine phosphorylation; positive regulation of protein autophosphorylation; positive regulation of cyclin-dependent protein serine/threonine kinase activity; positive regulation of apoptotic process; forebrain development; regulation of protein binding; cellular response to lipopolysaccharide; regulation of bone resorption; cell migration; signal transduction; positive regulation of cell adhesion; cell adhesion; positive regulation of protein processing; innate immune response; positive regulation of peptidyl-tyrosine phosphorylation; neurotrophin TRK receptor signaling pathway; positive regulation of small GTPase mediated signal transduction; bone resorption; central nervous system development; positive regulation of protein localization to nucleus; platelet-derived growth factor receptor signaling pathway; ERBB2 signaling pathway; intracellular estrogen receptor signaling pathway; axon guidance; macroautophagy; peptidyl-tyrosine phosphorylation; entry of bacterium into host cell; cell-cell adhesion; primary ovarian follicle growth; positive regulation of ovarian follicle development; transmembrane receptor protein tyrosine kinase signaling pathway; positive regulation of phosphatidylinositol 3-kinase signaling; cell differentiation; phosphatidylinositol phosphate biosynthetic process; regulation of postsynaptic neurotransmitter receptor activity; positive regulation of non-membrane spanning protein tyrosine kinase activity; G protein-coupled receptor signaling pathway; cellular response to hydrogen peroxide; positive regulation of platelet-derived growth factor receptor-beta signaling pathway; odontogenesis
Sources:Amigo / QuickGO
Orthologs
Databases	NCBI: entry; OMA: entry
Species	Human	Mouse
Entrez	6714	20779
Ensembl	ENSG00000197122	ENSMUSG00000027646
UniProt	P12931	P05480
RefSeq (mRNA)	NM_005417; NM_198291	NM_001025395; NM_009271
RefSeq (protein)	NP_005408; NP_938033	NP_001020566; NP_033297
Location (UCSC)	Chr 20: 37.34 – 37.41 Mb	Chr 2: 157.42 – 157.47 Mb
PubMed search
- Wikidata
View/Edit Human	View/Edit Mouse

Proto-oncogene tyrosine-protein kinase Src, also known as proto-oncogene c-Src, or simply c-Src (cellular Src; pronounced "sarc", as it is short for sarcoma), is a non-receptor tyrosine kinase protein that in humans is encoded by the SRC gene. It belongs to a family of Src family kinases and is similar to the v-Src (viral Src) gene of Rous sarcoma virus. It includes an SH2 domain, an SH3 domain and a tyrosine kinase domain. Two transcript variants encoding the same protein have been found for this gene.

c-Src phosphorylates specific tyrosine residues in other tyrosine kinases. It plays a role in the regulation of embryonic development and cell growth. An elevated level of activity of c-Src is suggested to be linked to cancer progression by promoting other signals. Mutations in c-Src could be involved in the malignant progression of colon cancer. c-Src should not be confused with CSK (C-terminal Src kinase), an enzyme that phosphorylates c-Src at its C-terminus and provides negative regulation of Src's enzymatic activity.

c-Src was originally discovered by American scientists J. Michael Bishop and Harold E. Varmus, for which they were awarded the 1989 Nobel Prize in Physiology or Medicine.

== Discovery ==
In 1979, J. Michael Bishop and Harold E. Varmus discovered that normal chickens possess a gene that is structurally closely related to v-Src. The normal cellular gene was called c-src (cellular-src). This discovery changed the current thinking about cancer from a model wherein cancer is caused by a foreign substance (a viral gene) to one where a gene that is normally present in the cell can cause cancer. It is believed that at one point an ancestral virus mistakenly incorporated the c-Src gene of its cellular host. Eventually this normal gene mutated into an abnormally functioning oncogene within the Rous sarcoma virus. Once the oncogene is transfected back into a chicken, it can lead to cancer.

== Structure ==
There are nine members of the Src family kinases: c-Src, Yes, Fyn, Fgr, Yrk, Lyn, Blk, Hck, and Lck. The expression of these Src family members are not the same throughout all tissues and cell types. Src, Fyn and Yes are expressed ubiquitously in all cell types while the others are generally found in hematopoietic cells.

c-Src is made up of six functional regions: Src homology 4 domain (SH4 domain), unique region, SH3 domain, SH2 domain, catalytic domain and short regulatory tail. When Src is inactive, the phosphorylated tyrosine group at the 527 position interacts with the SH2 domain which helps the SH3 domain interact with the flexible linker domain and thereby keeps the inactive unit tightly bound. The activation of c-Src causes the dephosphorylation of the tyrosine 527. This induces long-range allostery via protein domain dynamics, causing the structure to be destabilized, resulting in the opening up of the SH3, SH2 and kinase domains and the autophosphorylation of the residue tyrosine 416.

c-Src can be activated by many transmembrane proteins that include: adhesion receptors, receptor tyrosine kinases, G-protein coupled receptors and cytokine receptors. Most studies have looked at the receptor tyrosine kinases and examples of these are platelet derived growth factor receptor (PDGFR) pathway and epidermal growth factor receptor (EGFR).

Src contains at least three flexible protein domains, which, in conjunction with myristoylation, can mediate attachment to membranes and determine subcellular localization.

== Function ==
This proto-oncogene may play a role in the regulation of embryonic development and cell growth.

When src is activated, it promotes survival, angiogenesis, proliferation and invasion pathways. It also regulates angiogenic factors and vascular permeability after focal cerebral ischemia-reperfusion, and regulates matrix metalloproteinase-9 activity after intracerebral hemorrhage.

== Role in cancer ==
The activation of the c-Src pathway has been observed in about 50% of tumors from colon, liver, lung, breast and the pancreas. Since the activation of c-Src leads to the promotion of survival, angiogenesis, proliferation and invasion pathways, the aberrant growth of tumors in cancers is observed. A common mechanism is that there are genetic mutations that result in the increased activity or the overexpression of the c-Src leading to the constant activation of the c-Src.

=== Colon cancer ===
The activity of c-Src has been best characterized in colon cancer. Researchers have shown that Src expression is 5 to 8 fold higher in premalignant polyps than normal mucosa. The elevated c-Src levels have also been shown to have a correlation with advanced stages of the tumor, size of tumor, and metastatic potential of tumors.

=== Breast cancer ===
EGFR activates c-Src while EGF also increases the activity of c-Src. In addition, overexpression of c-Src increases the response of EGFR-mediated processes. So both EGFR and c-Src enhance the effects of one another. Elevated expression levels of c-Src were found in human breast cancer tissues compared to normal tissues.

Overexpression of Human Epidermal Growth Factor Receptor 2 (HER2), also known as erbB2, is correlated with a worse prognosis for breast cancer. Thus, c-Src plays a key role in the tumor progression of breast cancers.

=== Prostate cancer ===
Members of the Src family kinases Src, Lyn and Fgr are highly expressed in malignant prostate cells compared to normal prostate cells. When the primary prostate cells are treated with KRX-123, which is an inhibitor of Lyn, the cells in vitro were reduced in proliferation, migration and invasive potential. So the use of a tyrosine kinase inhibitor is a possible way of reducing the progression of prostate cancers.

== As a drug target ==
A number of tyrosine kinase inhibitors that target c-Src tyrosine kinase (as well as related tyrosine kinases) have been developed for therapeutic use. One notable example is dasatinib which has been approved for the treatment of chronic myeloid leukemia (CML) and Philadelphia chromosome-positive (PH+) acute lymphocytic leukemia (ALL). Dasatinib is also in clinical trials for the use in non-Hodgkin’s lymphoma, metastatic breast cancer and prostate cancer. Other tyrosine kinase inhibitor drugs that are in clinical trials include bosutinib, bafetinib, Saracatinib(AZD-0530), XLl-999, KX01 and XL228. HSP90 inhibitor NVP-BEP800 has been described to affect stability of Src tyrosine kinase and growth of T-cell and B-cell acute lymphoblastic leukemias.

== Interactions ==
Src (gene) has been shown to interact with the following signaling pathways:

=== Survival ===
- PI3K
- Akt
- IKK
- NFkB
- Caspase 9

=== Angiogenesis ===
- STAT3
- p38 MAPK
- VEGF
- IL-8

=== Proliferation ===
- Shc
- Grb2/SOS
- Ras
- Raf
- MEK1 / MEK2
- Erk1/2

=== Motility ===
- FAK
- p190Rho/GAP
- Paxillin
- p130CAS
- RhoA
- JNK
- c-jun
- MLCK
- Myosin

== Additional images ==
Overview of signal transduction pathways involved in apoptosis.

Top row: Beta-strand region

Hydrogen bonded turn Helical region

site	2	2	lipid-binding
site	17	17	Phosphoserine
site	35	35	Phosphoserine
site	69	69	Phosphoserine
site	74	74	Phosphothreonine
site	75	75	Phosphoserine; by CDK5
region	87	93	Beta-strand region
region	88	143	SH3
site	88	88	swapped dimer interface [polypeptide binding]
site	93	93	peptide ligand binding site [polypeptide binding]
region	99	102	Beta-strand region
region	110	114	Beta-strand region
region	117	117	Splicing variant
region	118	126	Beta-strand region
region	127	129	Hydrogen bonded turn
region	132	136	Beta-strand region
region	137	139	Helical region
region	140	142	Beta-strand region
region	146	148	Helical region
region	147	247	SH2
region	152	154	Beta-strand region
site	158	158	autoinhibitory site [polypeptide binding]
site	158	158	phosphotyrosine binding pocket [polypeptide binding]
region	158	165	Helical region
region	167	170	Beta-strand region
region	174	179	Beta-strand region
region	176	176	Variant
region	181	183	Beta-strand region
region	187	195	Beta-strand region
site	187	187	Phosphotyrosine (By similarity)
region	196	198	Hydrogen bonded turn
region	199	209	Beta-strand region
site	205	205	hydrophobic binding pocket [polypeptide binding]
region	211	213	Beta-strand region
region	215	218	Beta-strand region
region	221	225	Beta-strand region
region	226	233	Helical region
region	237	237	Variant
region	240	242	Beta-strand region
region	256	259	Beta-strand region
region	267	269	Helical region
region	270	519	Tyrosine kinase
region	270	278	Beta-strand region
site	276	276	Active site (ATP binding)
region	283	289	Beta-strand region
site	290	290	SH3/SH2 domain interface [polypeptide binding]
region	290	292	Hydrogen bonded turn
region	293	299	Beta-strand region
site	298	298	ATP
region	302	304	Hydrogen bonded turn
region	307	319	Helical region
region	328	332	Beta-strand region
region	334	336	Beta-strand region
region	338	341	Beta-strand region
region	349	353	Helical region
region	355	358	Helical region
region	363	382	Helical region
site	389	389	Proton acceptor
region	392	394	Helical region
region	395	397	Beta-strand region
region	399	401	Helical region
region	403	405	Beta-strand region
site	406	406	activation loop (A-loop)
region	410	413	Helical region
region	417	420	Helical region
site	419	419	Phosphotyrosine; by autocatalysis; alternate
site	419	419	Phosphotyrosine; by FAK2; alternate (By similarity)
region	423	426	Hydrogen bonded turn
region	429	431	Helical region
region	434	439	Helical region
site	439	439	Phosphotyrosine
region	444	459	Helical region
region	460	462	Hydrogen bonded turn
region	471	479	Helical region
region	492	501	Helical region
site	501	501	S-nitrosocysteine (By similarity)
region	506	508	Helical region
site	511	511	Phosphothreonine
region	512	520	Helical region
region	521	523	Hydrogen bonded turn
site	522	522	Phosphotyrosine
site	530	530	Phosphotyrosine; by CSK
