= FYN-binding protein 1 =

Protein-coding gene in the species Homo sapiens

FYB1
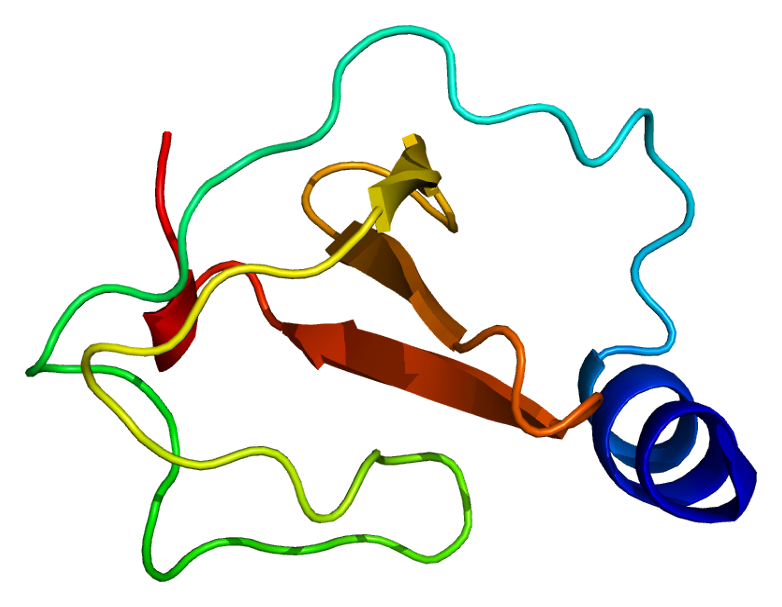

Identifiers
- Aliases: FYB1, FYN Binding Protein 1, ADAP, FYB-120/130, SLAP-130, FYB
- External IDs: OMIM: 602731; MGI: 1346327; GeneCards: FYB1
Available structures
PDB	Ortholog search: PDBe RCSB
PDB	List of PDB id codes 1RI9, 2GTJ, 2GTO

Gene location (Human)
Chr.	Chromosome 5 (human)
Band	5p13.1	Start	39,105,252 bp
Band	5p13.1	End	39,274,528 bp

Gene location (Mouse)
Chr.	Chromosome 15 (mouse)
Band	15|15 A1	Start	6,552,334 bp
Band	15|15 A1	End	6,692,794 bp

RNA expression pattern
Bgee	Human / Mouse (ortholog); Top expressed in: monocyte; blood; lymph node; bone marrow cell; trabecular bone; appendix; granulocyte; spleen; epithelium of colon; epithelium of nasopharynx / Top expressed in: granulocyte; thymus; spleen; lymph node; spermatid; mesenteric lymph nodes; blood; stroma of bone marrow; tibiofemoral joint; morula; More reference expression data
BioGPS	More reference expression data
Gene ontology
Molecular function	signaling receptor binding; protein binding; lipid binding; protein-containing complex binding
Cellular component	cytoplasm; cytosol; nucleus; actin cytoskeleton; plasma membrane; cell junction
Biological process	protein phosphorylation; intracellular signal transduction; protein localization to plasma membrane; T cell receptor signaling pathway; immune response; signal transduction; NLS-bearing protein import into nucleus; biological process; integrin-mediated signaling pathway
Sources:Amigo / QuickGO
Orthologs
Databases	NCBI: entry; OMA: entry
Species	Human	Mouse
Entrez	2533	23880
Ensembl	ENSG00000082074	ENSMUSG00000022148
UniProt	O15117	O35601
RefSeq (mRNA)	NM_001243093; NM_001465; NM_199335; NM_001349333; NM_018594	NM_001278269; NM_011815
RefSeq (protein)	NP_001230022; NP_001456; NP_955367; NP_001336262; NP_061064	NP_001265198; NP_035945
Location (UCSC)	Chr 5: 39.11 – 39.27 Mb	Chr 15: 6.55 – 6.69 Mb
PubMed search
- Wikidata
View/Edit Human	View/Edit Mouse

FYN binding protein (FYB-120/130), also known as FYB, ADAP (Adhesion and degranulation-promoting adapter protein), and SLAP-130 (SLP-76-associated phosphoprotein) is a protein that is encoded by the FYB1 gene in humans (previously FYB). The protein is expressed in T cells, monocytes, mast cells, macrophages, NK cells, but not B cells. FYB is a multifunctional protein involved in post-activation T cell signaling, lymphocyte cytokine production, cell adhesion, and actin remodeling.

== Structure ==
Two isoforms of FYB with different lengths of 120 and 130 kDa (FYB-120 and FYB-130) exist. The 130kDa version has an extra insertion of 46 amino acids and is preferentially expressed in peripheral T cells. The FYB protein has a variety of binding domains: a non-structured N-terminal region, a proline-rich region, two SH3 domains, a FPPP-motif which binds the ENA/VASP protein family, and other tyrosine-based signaling motifs.

== Function ==
FYB is critical for activation and proliferation of T-helper cells (CD4+) and required for chemokine signal transduction in T-helper cells and cytotoxic T cells (CD8+).

FYB regulates cytokine production in T cells as well as in activated NK cells through the FYN-ADAP axis. In T cells, after TCR stimulation, a unique region of FYB, pYDGI, allows phosphorylation of the protein by FYN. After being phosphorylated, ADAP can bind to Carma1, causing NF-κB translocation into the nucleus and cytokine production.

In mast cells, FYB regulates cell adhesion as well as degranulation. In T cells, FYB allows for cell adhesion and migration through blood vessels through the SLP-76-FYB-SKAP1 complex. After being phosphorylated by FYN, FYB can bind to SLP-76. This binding of FYB and SLP-76 regulates "outside-in signaling" or the transfer of signals from outside the cell to inside the cell by integrin. FYB can also bind to SKAP1, which allows SKAP1 to upregulate integrin activity through interactions with Rap1. The bacteria Yersinia can interfere with this pathway in macrophages through the secretion of YopH (Yersinia protein tyrosine phosphatase) into the macrophage, which de-phosphorylates FYB and SKAP1, leading to a decrease in integrin activity that results in an inhibition of adhesion, phagocytosis, and cytotoxicity.

FYB is also an important protein for actin remodeling of immune cells. This is thought to occur through the binding of proteins of the ENA/VASP protein family to the FPPPP-motif of the FYB protein.
