= Saracatinib =

Chemical compound

Clinical data
- Routes of administration: Oral

Legal status
- Legal status: Investigational

Identifiers
- IUPAC name: N-(5-chloro-1,3-benzodioxol-4-yl)-7-[2-(4-methyl-1-piperazinyl)ethoxy]-5-[(tetrahydro-2H-pyran-4-yl)oxy]-4-quinazolinamine
- CAS Number: 379231-04-6
- PubChem CID: 10302451
- ChemSpider: 8477917
- UNII: 9KD24QGH76
- KEGG: D09664
- ChEBI: CHEBI:47458
- CompTox Dashboard (EPA): DTXSID90191355

Chemical and physical data
- Formula: C_{27}H_{32}ClN_{5}O_{5}
- Molar mass: 542.03 g·mol^{−1}
- 3D model (JSmol): Interactive image
- SMILES: C4CN(C)CCN4CCOc(cc2ncn3)cc(OC6CCOCC6)c2c3Nc1c(Cl)ccc5OCOc15
- InChI: InChI=1S/C27H32ClN5O5/c1-32-6-8-33(9-7-32)10-13-35-19-14-21-24(23(15-19)38-18-4-11-34-12-5-18)27(30-16-29-21)31-25-20(28)2-3-22-26(25)37-17-36-22/h2-3,14-16,18H,4-13,17H2,1H3,(H,29,30,31); Key:OUKYUETWWIPKQR-UHFFFAOYSA-N

Saracatinib (AZD-0530) is an experimental drug being developed by AstraZeneca. It acts as a dual kinase inhibitor, with selective actions as a Src inhibitor and a Bcr-Abl tyrosine-kinase inhibitor.

It was originally under development for the treatment of cancer, but while it appeared promising in animal studies and was well tolerated in humans, it failed to show sufficient efficacy in cancer patients and was ultimately not developed further for this application. However, saracatinib has subsequently been researched for other applications such as Alzheimer's disease. AZD0530 is an inhibitor of Src and Abl family kinases1. It has been developed as treatment for malignancies because these kinases play a role in tumor invasion and proliferation. However, the Src family kinases (SFKs) are highly expressed in brain and have major effects on synaptic plasticity2. Moreover, the investigators have recently shown that a specific SFK, namely Fyn, is aberrantly activated by specific conformations of the Amyloid Beta (Aß) peptide from Alzheimer's disease (AD). Genetic deletion of Fyn rescues AD deficits in preclinical models. This clinical trial will test the potential benefit of AZD0530 for Alzheimer's disease modification. and schizophrenia. It has furthermore been described that Saracatinib impairs maintenance of human T-cells Acute Lymphoblastic Leukemia by targeting the LCK tyrosine kinase in cells displaying high level of lipid rafts.

== See also ==
- Bosutinib
- Dasatinib
