= Karen Beemon =

American molecular biologist

- Born: United States
- Education: University of Michigan (BS); University of California at Berkeley (PhD)
- Known for: Kinase
- Scientific career
- Fields: Biology
- Workplaces: Salk Institute for Biological Studies; Johns Hopkins University
- Thesis: The complexity of tumor virus RNA (1974)
- Doctoral advisor: Peter Duesberg
- Website: bio.jhu.edu/directory/karen-beemon/

Karen Beemon is an American molecular biologist and professor of biology at Johns Hopkins University known for her research on RNA viruses and viral oncogenesis.

== Career ==
Beemon got her B.S. (with distinction) in 1969 from the University of Michigan, and then her Ph.D. from the University of California at Berkeley, where she worked with Peter Duesberg in collaboration with Peter Vogt. As a graduate student, Beemon determined the size of retroviral genomes which led to the characterization of the Src oncogene of Rous sarcoma virus, the first tyrosine kinase, during her postdoctoral tenure (1978–1979) with Tony Hunter at the Salk Institute for Biological Studies in San Diego. The discovery of tyrosine kinase and its role in oncogenesis had far-reaching impact on the treatment of cancer, as it led to the development and widespread use of protein kinase inhibitors for treating cancer and inflammation.

In 1981, Beemon started her teaching career in the Department of Biology at Johns Hopkins University. Beemon directed the CMDB graduate program from 2003 to 2006. She served as the chair of the Biology Department from 2006 to 2009, being the first woman to chair a science department in the Zanvyl Krieger School of Arts and Sciences. Beemon subsequently chaired the Krieger School Status of Women Committee and served on the Homewood Academic Council. She has been a senior editor of the Journal of Virology since 2007 and has served on several study sections and review boards at the National Institutes of Health.

== Recognition ==
Beemon won the 2007 Retrovirology Prize for her research, which included her discovery of the role of post-transcriptional regulation in viral oncogenesis. She also received a Faculty Research Award from the American Cancer Society and a Fogarty Senior International Fellowship, and she was named a fellow of the American Academy of Microbiology.
