= CBLC =

Protein-coding gene in humans

Identifiers
- Aliases: CBLC, CBL-3, CBL-SL, RNF57, Cbl proto-oncogene C
- External IDs: OMIM: 608453; MGI: 1931457; GeneCards: CBLC
Available structures
PDB	Ortholog search: PDBe RCSB
PDB	List of PDB id codes 3OP0, 3VRN, 3VRO, 3VRP, 3VRQ, 3VRR
Enzyme activity
EC #	BRENDA	ExPASy	KEGG	MetaCyc
2.3.2.27	↗	↗	↗	↗

Gene location (Human)
Chr.	Chromosome 19 (human)
Band	19q13.32	Start	44,777,869 bp
Band	19q13.32	End	44,800,652 bp

Gene location (Mouse)
Chr.	Chromosome 7 (mouse)
Band	7|7 A3	Start	19,512,806 bp
Band	7|7 A3	End	19,530,734 bp
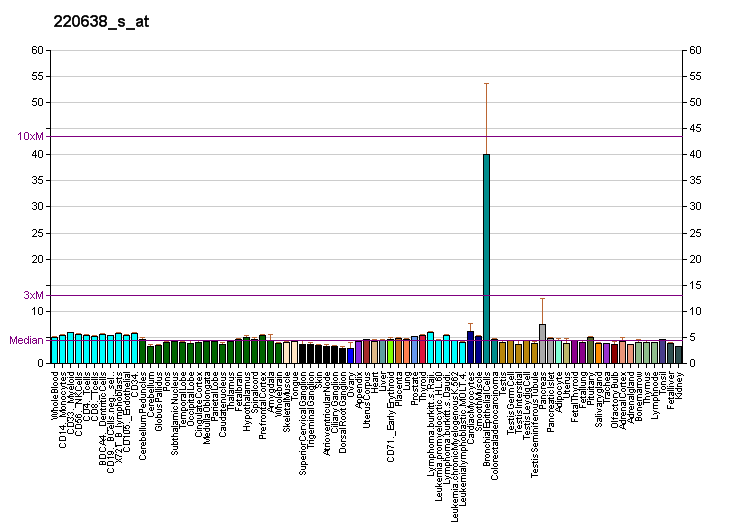
RNA expression pattern
Bgee	Human / Mouse (ortholog); Top expressed in: mucosa of transverse colon; skin of abdomen; skin of leg; duodenum; right lobe of liver; body of pancreas; jejunal mucosa; rectum; olfactory zone of nasal mucosa; minor salivary glands / Top expressed in: duodenum; intestinal villus; right kidney; epithelium of stomach; jejunum; lip; proximal tubule; colon; esophagus; lumbar spinal ganglion; More reference expression data
BioGPS	More reference expression data
Gene ontology
Molecular function	SH3 domain binding; phosphotyrosine residue binding; calcium ion binding; epidermal growth factor receptor binding; ubiquitin protein ligase activity; metal ion binding; ubiquitin-protein transferase activity; transferase activity; receptor tyrosine kinase binding; zinc ion binding; protein binding
Cellular component	plasma membrane; membrane raft
Biological process	negative regulation of epidermal growth factor-activated receptor activity; cell surface receptor signaling pathway; negative regulation of epidermal growth factor receptor signaling pathway; negative regulation of MAP kinase activity; protein ubiquitination; regulation of signaling; ubiquitin-dependent protein catabolic process; signal transduction
Sources:Amigo / QuickGO
Orthologs
Databases	NCBI: entry; OMA: entry
Species	Human	Mouse
Entrez	23624	80794
Ensembl	ENSG00000142273	ENSMUSG00000040525
UniProt	Q9ULV8	Q80XL1
RefSeq (mRNA)	NM_001130852; NM_012116	NM_001161844; NM_023224
RefSeq (protein)	NP_001124324; NP_036248	NP_001155316; NP_075713
Location (UCSC)	Chr 19: 44.78 – 44.8 Mb	Chr 7: 19.51 – 19.53 Mb
PubMed search
- Wikidata
View/Edit Human	View/Edit Mouse

Signal transduction protein CBL-C is a protein that in humans is encoded by the CBLC gene.

CBL proteins, such as CBLC, are phosphorylated upon activation of a variety of receptors that signal via protein tyrosine kinases. Through interactions with proteins containing SRC (MIM 190090) homology-2 (SH2) and SH3 domains, CBL proteins modulate downstream cell signaling (Keane et al., 1999).[supplied by OMIM]

== Interactions ==
CBLC has been shown to interact with FYN and Epidermal growth factor receptor.
