= FYN =

Protein-coding gene in humans

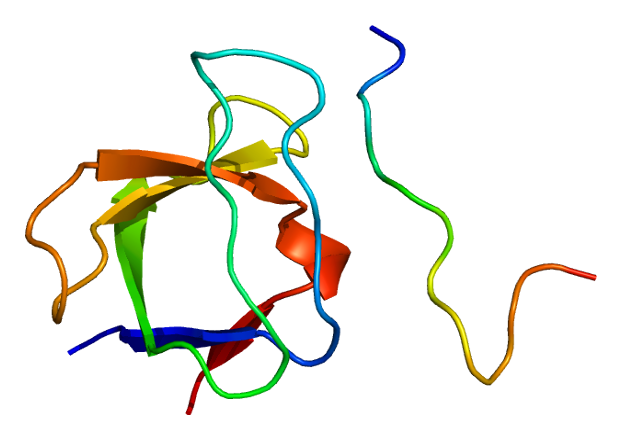

Identifiers
- Aliases: FYN, SLK, SYN, p59-FYN proto-oncogene, Src family tyrosine kinase
- External IDs: OMIM: 137025; MGI: 95602; GeneCards: FYN
Available structures
PDB	Ortholog search: PDBe RCSB
PDB	List of PDB id codes 1A0N, 1AOT, 1AOU, 1AVZ, 1AZG, 1EFN, 1FYN, 1G83, 1M27, 1NYF, 1NYG, 1SHF, 1ZBJ, 2DQ7, 3H0F, 3H0H, 3H0I, 3UA6, 3UA7, 4D8D, 4EIK, 2MQI, 2MRJ, 2MRK, 4U17, 4U1P, 4ZNX
Enzyme activity
EC #	BRENDA	ExPASy	KEGG	MetaCyc
2.7.10.2	↗	↗	↗	↗

Gene location (Human)
Chr.	Chromosome 6 (human)
Band	6q21	Start	111,660,332 bp
Band	6q21	End	111,873,452 bp

Gene location (Mouse)
Chr.	Chromosome 10 (mouse)
Band	10 B1|10 20.51 cM	Start	39,368,855 bp
Band	10 B1|10 20.51 cM	End	39,565,381 bp
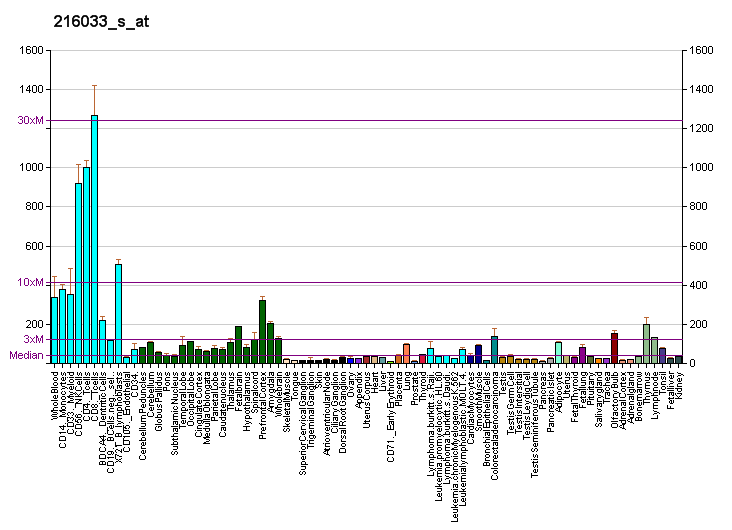

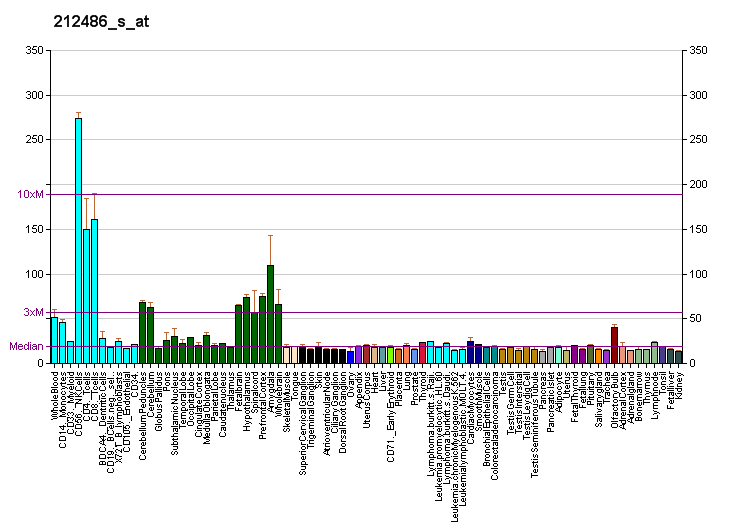

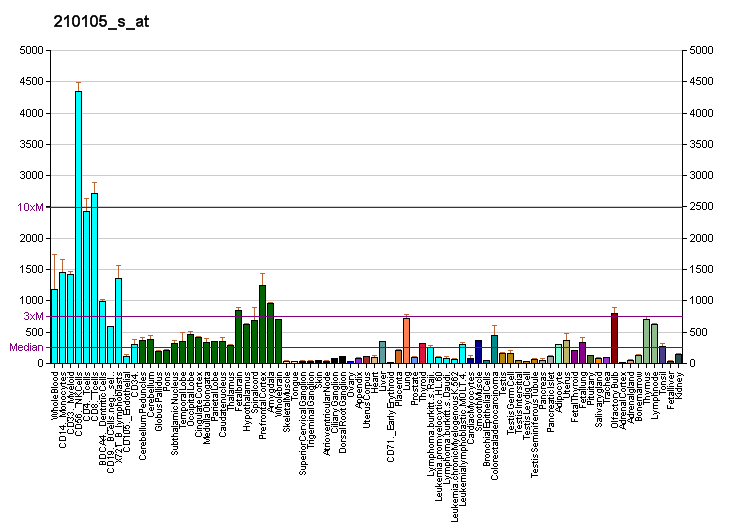
RNA expression pattern
Bgee	Human / Mouse (ortholog); Top expressed in: ganglionic eminence; corpus callosum; granulocyte; olfactory bulb; lymph node; optic nerve; right lung; ventricular zone; amygdala; dorsal motor nucleus of vagus nerve / Top expressed in: optic nerve; Rostral migratory stream; ganglionic eminence; dentate gyrus of hippocampal formation granule cell; olfactory bulb; gastrula; ventricular zone; zygote; barrel cortex; secondary oocyte; More reference expression data
BioGPS	More reference expression data
Gene ontology
Molecular function	CD4 receptor binding; transmembrane transporter binding; protein-containing complex binding; protein binding; CD8 receptor binding; kinase activity; tubulin binding; signaling receptor binding; ATP binding; protein kinase activity; metal ion binding; peptide hormone receptor binding; T cell receptor binding; transferase activity; ephrin receptor binding; nucleotide binding; growth factor receptor binding; phosphatidylinositol 3-kinase binding; G protein-coupled receptor binding; non-membrane spanning protein tyrosine kinase activity; phosphatidylinositol-4,5-bisphosphate 3-kinase activity; protein tyrosine kinase activity; enzyme binding; identical protein binding; signal transducer activity; type 5 metabotropic glutamate receptor binding; alpha-tubulin binding; tau protein binding; tau-protein kinase activity; disordered domain specific binding
Cellular component	cytoplasm; membrane; extrinsic component of cytoplasmic side of plasma membrane; mitochondrion; nucleus; membrane raft; intracellular membrane-bounded organelle; actin filament; cell periphery; endosome; plasma membrane; cytosol; postsynaptic density; dendrite; cell body; perinuclear region of cytoplasm; perinuclear endoplasmic reticulum; glial cell projection; Schaffer collateral - CA1 synapse; glutamatergic synapse; postsynaptic density, intracellular component
Biological process	negative regulation of neuron apoptotic process; adaptive immune response; learning; platelet activation; cell surface receptor signaling pathway; vascular endothelial growth factor receptor signaling pathway; feeding behavior; response to ethanol; calcium ion transport; regulation of apoptotic process; cellular response to transforming growth factor beta stimulus; Fc-gamma receptor signaling pathway involved in phagocytosis; negative regulation of protein catabolic process; transmembrane receptor protein tyrosine kinase signaling pathway; stimulatory C-type lectin receptor signaling pathway; negative regulation of gene expression; protein autophosphorylation; T cell activation; detection of mechanical stimulus involved in sensory perception of pain; cell differentiation; dendrite morphogenesis; phosphorylation; immune system process; neuron migration; cellular response to platelet-derived growth factor stimulus; regulation of cell shape; peptidyl-tyrosine autophosphorylation; phosphatidylinositol-mediated signaling; leukocyte migration; positive regulation of protein localization to nucleus; intracellular signal transduction; activated T cell proliferation; ephrin receptor signaling pathway; cellular response to growth factor stimulus; T cell costimulation; blood coagulation; mitigation of host defenses by virus; MAPK cascade; axon guidance; multicellular organism development; negative regulation of protein ubiquitination; cellular response to peptide hormone stimulus; regulation of cell population proliferation; positive regulation of neuron projection development; positive regulation of I-kappaB kinase/NF-kappaB signaling; positive regulation of phosphatidylinositol 3-kinase signaling; peptidyl-tyrosine phosphorylation; forebrain development; negative regulation of extrinsic apoptotic signaling pathway in absence of ligand; T cell receptor signaling pathway; cell migration; viral process; innate immune response; positive regulation of GTPase activity; phosphatidylinositol phosphate biosynthetic process; regulation of phosphatidylinositol 3-kinase signaling; protein phosphorylation; central nervous system development; regulation of peptidyl-tyrosine phosphorylation; positive regulation of protein targeting to membrane; positive regulation of neuron death; negative regulation of dendritic spine maintenance; response to amyloid-beta; regulation of calcium ion import across plasma membrane; response to singlet oxygen; heart process; negative regulation of hydrogen peroxide biosynthetic process; cytokine-mediated signaling pathway; positive regulation of tyrosine phosphorylation of STAT protein; response to hydrogen peroxide; modulation of chemical synaptic transmission; positive regulation of protein kinase B signaling; dendritic spine maintenance; regulation of glutamate receptor signaling pathway; negative regulation of oxidative stress-induced cell death; positive regulation of non-membrane spanning protein tyrosine kinase activity; cellular response to L-glutamate; cellular response to glycine; positive regulation of protein localization to membrane; positive regulation of cysteine-type endopeptidase activity; cellular response to amyloid-beta
Sources:Amigo / QuickGO
Orthologs
Databases	NCBI: entry; OMA: entry
Species	Human	Mouse
Entrez	2534	14360
Ensembl	ENSG00000010810	ENSMUSG00000019843
UniProt	P06241	P39688
RefSeq (mRNA)	NM_001242779; NM_002037; NM_153047; NM_153048; NM_001370529	NM_001122892; NM_001122893; NM_008054
RefSeq (protein)	NP_002028; NP_694592; NP_694593; NP_001357458	NP_001116364; NP_001116365; NP_032080
Location (UCSC)	Chr 6: 111.66 – 111.87 Mb	Chr 10: 39.37 – 39.57 Mb
PubMed search
- Wikidata
View/Edit Human	View/Edit Mouse

Proto-oncogene tyrosine-protein kinase Fyn (p59-FYN, Slk, Syn, MGC45350, Gene ID 2534) is an enzyme that in humans is encoded by the FYN gene.

Fyn is a 59-kDa member of the Src family of kinases typically associated with T-cell and neuronal signaling in development and normal cell physiology. Disruptions in these signaling pathways often have implications in the formation of a variety of cancers. By definition as a proto-oncogene, Fyn codes for proteins that help regulate cell growth. Changes in its DNA sequence transform it into an oncogene that leads to the formation of a different protein with implications for normal cell regulation.

Fyn is a member of the protein-tyrosine kinase oncogene family. It encodes a membrane-associated tyrosine kinase that has been implicated in the control of cell growth. The protein associates with the p85 subunit of phosphatidylinositol 3-kinase and interacts with the fyn-binding protein. Alternatively spliced transcript variants encoding distinct isoforms exist.

== History ==
Fyn is a member of the Src-family of kinases (SFK), the first proto-oncogene to be identified. The discovery of the Src-family in 1976 led to the Nobel prize for medicine in 1989 for J.M Bishop and E.M. Varmus. Fyn was first identified in 1986 as Syn or Slk through probes derived from v-yes and v-fgr. A common feature of SFKs is that they are commonly upregulated in cancers. Fyn is functionally distinct from its family members in that it interacts with FAK and paxillin (PXN) in the regulation of cell morphology and motility.

== Function ==
Fyn is a protein, present in the signaling pathway of integrins, which activates ras. Fyn is a tyrosine-specific phospho-transferase that is a member of the Src family of non-receptor tyrosine protein kinases. (This family also includes Abl, Src, focal adhesion kinase and Janus kinase.) Fyn is located downstream of several cell surface receptors, commonly associated with neuronal development and T-cell signaling. When fyn is activated it causes downstream activation of molecular signals that drive processes crucial to growth and motility of cells. Fyn is primarily localized to the cytoplasmic leaflet of the plasma membrane, where it phosphorylates tyrosine residues on key targets involved in a variety of different signaling pathways. Tyrosine phosphorylation of target proteins by Fyn serves to either regulate target protein activity, and/or to generate a binding site on the target protein that recruits other signaling molecules. Fyn also is a tumor suppressor. When this normal biology is compromised, the altered Fyn becomes involved in the neoplastic transformation of normal cells to cancerous ones following the pathway from pre-invasive, to invasive, and ultimately metastasis.

Fyn also appears to play an important role in fertilization including in the rapid Inositol trisphosphate-mediated calcium signaling which occurs when oocyte and sperm interact. Fyn expression levels are much higher in oocytes than even neurons and T-cells and it has been suggested to be an 'oocyte-specific kinase'. Several studies point to Fyn as being responsible for dramatic biochemical changes in the oocyte cortex during oocyte maturation. Fyn may also play an important role in proper shaping of sperm head and acrosome within the testis and possibly has an additional role in the sperm acrosome reaction.

== Role in signaling pathways ==
An understanding of the role of fyn in normal biology is crucial to the understanding of its role in cancer, as cancer is the dysregulation of these normal pathways. Knowing which pathways involve Fyn will provide key insight for the development of potential pharmacologic agents to attenuate this uncontrolled signaling.

At least three tools have been useful in discerning a requirement for Fyn function in a particular signaling system:

- cells derived from Fyn-/- mice (as well as cells derived from Fyn, Src, Yes, Fyn triple knockout mice (SYF));
- a kinase-inactive, dominant negative mutant form of Fyn (K299M);
- pharmacologic inhibitors of Src family kinases, such as PP2; note that PP2 also inhibits other tyrosine protein kinases such as Abl, PDGFR and c-Kit.

Using these tools, a requirement for Fyn has been shown for the following signaling pathways: T and B cell receptor signaling, integrin-mediated signaling, growth factor and cytokine receptor signaling, platelet activation, ion channel function, cell adhesion, axon guidance, fertilization, entry into mitosis, and differentiation of natural killer cells, oligodendrocytes and keratinocytes. Fyn also has an important role to play in TLR-mediated immune responses from T cells.

== Interactions ==
FYN has been shown to interact with:

- ADD2,
- BCAR1,
- C-Raf,
- CBLC,
- CD36,
- CD44,
- CDH1,
- CHRNA7,
- CTNND1,
- CBL,
- CSF1R,
- DLG4,
- Dystroglycan,
- EPHA8,
- FYB,
- FASLG,
- GNB2L1,
- GRIN2A,
- ITK,
- Janus kinase 2,
- KHDRBS1,
- Lck,
- LKB1,
- Nephrin,
- PAG1,
- PIK3R2,
- PRKCQ,
- PTK2B,
- PTK2,
- PTPRT
- UNC119,
- RICS,
- SH2D1A,
- SKAP1,
- Syk,
- TNK2,
- TRPC6,
- Tau protein,
- TrkB,
- TYK2,
- TUBA3C,
- WAS, and
- ZAP-70,

== Role in cancer biology ==
The Src family of kinases is commonly associated with its role in "invasion and tumor progression, epithelial-to-mesenchymal transition, angiogenesis, and development of metastasis," all hallmarks of cancer progression. Fyn's normal function in cellular growth and proliferation has the potential to be exploited in the progression and metastasis of cancer cells. Overexpression of Fyn has been found to drive morphologic transformation in normal cells and increase "anchorage-independent growth and prominent morphologic changes."

Fyn overexpression has been studied in relation to the following cancers: prostate cancer, glioblastoma multiform, squamous cell carcinoma of the head and neck, pancreatic cancer, chronic melogenic leukemia, and melanoma. This overexpression triggers a promotion of "anti-apoptotic activity of Akt" in prostate cancer, meaning that these cells have gained the ability to avoid the normal cell death pathways (a common hallmark of cancer). Additionally, in glioblastoma multiform, Src and Fyn have been found to be "effectors of oncogenic EGFR signaling" which has led to tumor invasion and cancer cell survival.

Fyn's normal role in cell migration and adhesion enables it to utilize the normal cell biology of integrin and FAK for cancer growth. Normal integrin is a cell surface receptor that interacts with the extracellular matrix to send signals influencing cell shape and motility. Normal FAK is a tyrosine kinase that gets recruited to focal adhesion sites and plays a key role in directed cell movement. These normal pathways plan a key role in "mediation of Fyn transmitted cellular events impacting shape and motility." A compromised version of this pathway would enable cancer cells to change shape and motility, increasing the possibility for advanced invasion and metastasis. Additional pathways under investigation regarding Fyn's role in cancer progression include: the Rac and Rho family of GTPases, Ras, Erk, and MAPK.

Because of this, Fyn has been a common target for anti-cancer therapeutic research. The inhibition of Fyn (like other SFKs) results in decreased cell growth. Furthermore, "expression of kinase-dead-Fyn (KD-Fyn), a specific competitor of endogenous Fyn," was found to reduce the size of primary tumors in mice. Specifically targeting the unique identifying properties of Fyn as well as inhibiting FAK and PXN has the potential to create a very effective molecularly targeted combination cancer therapy. Fyn inhibitors are also being explored as potential therapies for Alzheimer's Disease.
