= SKAP1 =

Protein-coding gene in the species Homo sapiens

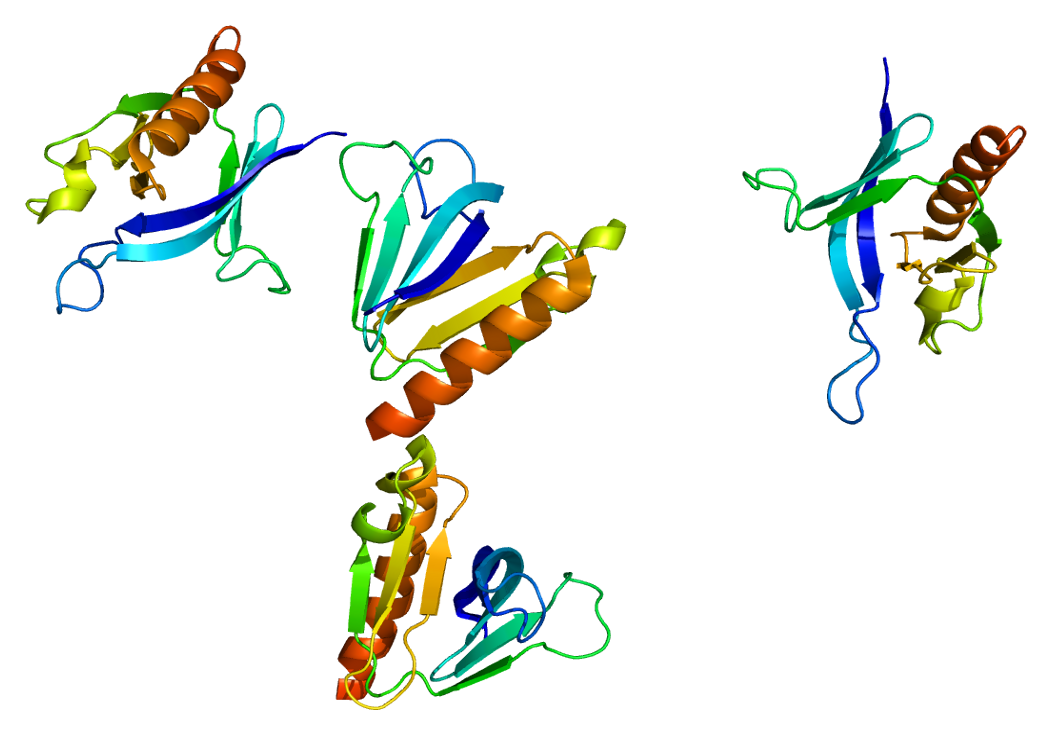

Identifiers
- Aliases: SKAP1, HEL-S-81p, SCAP1, SKAP55, src kinase associated phosphoprotein 1
- External IDs: OMIM: 604969; MGI: 1925723; GeneCards: SKAP1
Available structures
PDB	Ortholog search: PDBe RCSB
PDB	List of PDB id codes 1U5D

Gene location (Human)
Chr.	Chromosome 17 (human)
Band	17q21.32	Start	48,133,442 bp
Band	17q21.32	End	48,430,275 bp

Gene location (Mouse)
Chr.	Chromosome 11 (mouse)
Band	11|11 D	Start	96,355,419 bp
Band	11|11 D	End	96,649,956 bp
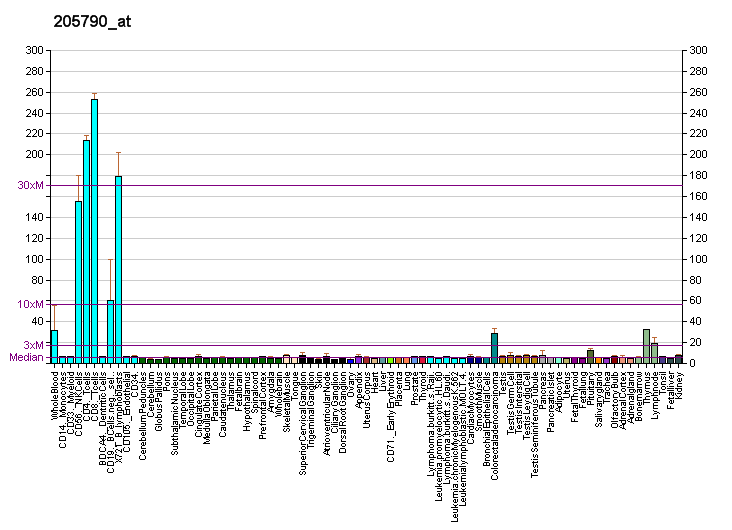
RNA expression pattern
Bgee	Human / Mouse (ortholog); Top expressed in: granulocyte; right lobe of liver; right uterine tube; lymph node; blood; pituitary gland; right testis; left testis; anterior pituitary; right adrenal cortex / Top expressed in: thymus; zygote; secondary oocyte; primary oocyte; mesenteric lymph nodes; blood; islet of Langerhans; seminal vesicula; embryo; lumbar subsegment of spinal cord; More reference expression data
BioGPS	More reference expression data
Gene ontology
Molecular function	SH3 domain binding; SH2 domain binding; protein binding; protein phosphatase binding; protein kinase binding; protein-containing complex binding; protein homodimerization activity; microtubule plus-end binding
Cellular component	cytoplasm; membrane; cell-cell junction; plasma membrane; T cell receptor complex; nucleus; cytosol; ruffle; immunological synapse; microtubule plus-end; plasma membrane raft
Biological process	adaptive immune response; immune system process; positive regulation of transcription, DNA-templated; protein localization to plasma membrane; T cell receptor signaling pathway; positive regulation of cell adhesion; positive regulation of transcription by RNA polymerase II; positive regulation of signal transduction; microtubule cytoskeleton organization; positive regulation of cell-matrix adhesion; positive regulation of adaptive immune response; cell migration; positive regulation of integrin activation; positive regulation of cell-cell adhesion mediated by integrin; positive regulation of heterotypic cell-cell adhesion; cellular response to epidermal growth factor stimulus; positive regulation of leukocyte cell-cell adhesion
Sources:Amigo / QuickGO
Orthologs
Databases	NCBI: entry; OMA: entry
Species	Human	Mouse
Entrez	8631	78473
Ensembl	ENSG00000141293	ENSMUSG00000057058
UniProt	Q86WV1	Q3UUV5
RefSeq (mRNA)	NM_001075099; NM_003726	NM_001033186; NM_001177898; NM_001177899
RefSeq (protein)	NP_001068567; NP_003717	NP_001028358; NP_001171369; NP_001171370
Location (UCSC)	Chr 17: 48.13 – 48.43 Mb	Chr 11: 96.36 – 96.65 Mb
PubMed search
- Wikidata
View/Edit Human	View/Edit Mouse

Src kinase-associated phosphoprotein 1 is an adapter protein that in humans is encoded by the SKAP1 gene.

This gene encodes a T cell adapter protein, a class of intracellular molecules with modular domains capable of recruiting additional proteins but that exhibit no intrinsic enzymatic activity. The encoded protein contains a unique N-terminal region followed by a PH domain and C-terminal SH3 domain. Along with the adhesion and degranulation-promoting adapter protein, the encoded protein plays a critical role in inside-out signaling by coupling T-cell antigen receptor stimulation to the activation of integrins.

The demonstration that SKAP1 regulates LFA-1 adhesion was made by retroviral infection and by the SKAP1 deficient mouse. Additional work has implicated SKAP1 in binding to the exchange factor RasGRP1 and in regulating ERK activation in T-cells.

== Interactions ==
SKAP1 has been shown to interact with FYN, PTPRC and FYB.
