= ADD2 =

Protein-coding gene in humans

Identifiers
- Aliases: ADD2, ADDB, adducin 2
- External IDs: OMIM: 102681; MGI: 87919; GeneCards: ADD2

Gene location (Human)
Chr.	Chromosome 2 (human)
Band	2p13.3	Start	70,607,618 bp
Band	2p13.3	End	70,768,225 bp

Gene location (Mouse)
Chr.	Chromosome 6 (mouse)
Band	6 C3- D1|6 37.55 cM	Start	86,005,663 bp
Band	6 C3- D1|6 37.55 cM	End	86,101,391 bp
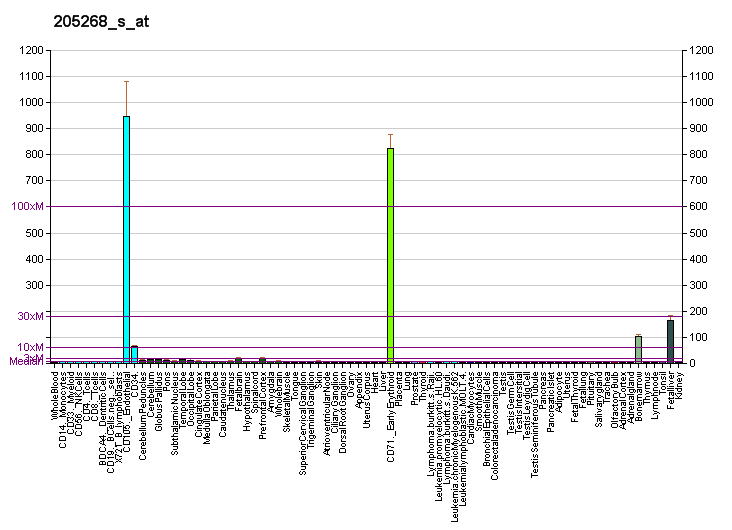
RNA expression pattern
Bgee	Human / Mouse (ortholog); Top expressed in: Brodmann area 10; middle temporal gyrus; Brodmann area 23; paraflocculus of cerebellum; frontal pole; Region I of hippocampus proper; postcentral gyrus; Brodmann area 46; entorhinal cortex; superior frontal gyrus / Top expressed in: olfactory tubercle; Region I of hippocampus proper; piriform cortex; dentate gyrus; facial motor nucleus; central gray substance of midbrain; dentate gyrus of hippocampal formation granule cell; subiculum; pontine nuclei; visual cortex; More reference expression data
BioGPS	More reference expression data
Gene ontology
Molecular function	spectrin binding; protein homodimerization activity; structural molecule activity; calmodulin binding; actin filament binding; protein heterodimerization activity; actin binding; protein kinase binding
Cellular component	F-actin capping protein complex; cytoplasm; cytosol; membrane; plasma membrane; cytoskeleton; postsynaptic density; cytoplasmic vesicle; plasma membrane raft
Biological process	barbed-end actin filament capping; actin filament bundle assembly; transmembrane transport; positive regulation of protein binding; actin cytoskeleton organization; leukocyte migration; leukocyte tethering or rolling; protein-containing complex assembly; hemopoiesis; synapse assembly
Sources:Amigo / QuickGO
Orthologs
Databases	NCBI: entry; OMA: entry
Species	Human	Mouse
Entrez	119	11519
Ensembl	ENSG00000075340	ENSMUSG00000030000
UniProt	P35612	Q9QYB8
RefSeq (mRNA)	NM_001185054; NM_001185055; NM_001617; NM_017482; NM_017483 NM_017484; NM_017485; NM_017486; NM_017487; NM_017488	NM_001271857; NM_001271858; NM_001271859; NM_001271860; NM_001271861 NM_013458
RefSeq (protein)	NP_001171983; NP_001171984; NP_001608; NP_059516; NP_059522	NP_001258786; NP_001258787; NP_001258788; NP_001258789; NP_001258790 NP_038486
Location (UCSC)	Chr 2: 70.61 – 70.77 Mb	Chr 6: 86.01 – 86.1 Mb
PubMed search
- Wikidata
View/Edit Human	View/Edit Mouse

Beta-adducin is a protein that in humans is encoded by the ADD2 gene.

== Function ==
Adducins are heteromeric proteins composed of different subunits referred to as adducin alpha, beta, and gamma. The three subunits are encoded by distinct genes and belong to a family of membrane skeletal proteins involved in the assembly of spectrin-actin network in erythrocytes and at sites of cell-cell contact in epithelial tissues.

While adducins alpha and gamma are ubiquitously expressed, the expression of adducin beta is restricted to brain and hematopoietic tissues. Adducin, originally purified from human erythrocytes, was found to be a heterodimer of adducins alpha and beta. Polymorphisms resulting in amino acid substitutions in these two subunits have been associated with the regulation of blood pressure in an animal model of hypertension. Heterodimers consisting of alpha and gamma subunits have also been described. Structurally, each subunit is composed of two distinct domains.

The amino-terminal region is protease resistant and globular in shape, while the carboxy-terminal region is protease sensitive. The latter contains multiple phosphorylation sites for protein kinase C, the binding site for calmodulin, and is required for association with spectrin and actin. Various adducin beta mRNAs, alternatively spliced at 3' end and/or internally spliced and encoding different isoforms, have been described. The functions of all the different isoforms are not known.

== Interactions ==
ADD2 has been shown to interact with FYN.
