= PP2 (kinase inhibitor) =

Names
- Preferred IUPAC name 1-tert-Butyl-3-(4-chlorophenyl)-1H-pyrazolo[3,4-d]pyrimidin-4-amine

Identifiers
CAS Number	172889-27-9
3D model (JSmol)	Interactive image
ChEBI	CHEBI:78331
ChemSpider	4712
PubChem CID	4878
UNII	PK8JPC58XB
CompTox Dashboard (EPA)	DTXSID60274447
- InChI: InChI=1S/C15H16ClN5/c1-15(2,3)21-14-11(13(17)18-8-19-14)12(20-21)9-4-6-10(16)7-5-9/h4-8H,1-3H3,(H2,17,18,19)
- SMILES: Nc2ncnc(c12)n(C(C)(C)C)nc1-c3ccc(Cl)cc3

Properties
Chemical formula	C_{15}H_{16}ClN_{5}
Molar mass	301.78 g·mol^{−1}
Appearance	White to off-white solid
Solubility in DMSO	25 mg/ml
- Except where otherwise noted, data are given for materials in their standard state (at 25 °C [77 °F], 100 kPa). verify (what is ?) Infobox references

PP2 is a substance that has frequently been used in cancer research as a "selective" inhibitor for Src-family kinases. It strongly inhibits the kinases Lck (IC_{50}=4 nM), Fyn (5 nM) and Hck (5 nM), shows weaker inhibition of epidermal growth factor receptor (480 nM) and practically no inhibition of ZAP-70 (100 μM) and JAK2 (50 μM). Despite its extensive use as a Src-selective inhibitor, recent research has shown that PP2 is non-selective and inhibits many other kinases with similar affinities.

== Structure ==
PP2A is a heterotrimeric enzyme composed of three types of subunits:

- Catalytic subunit (C subunit): performs the dephosphorylation.
- Scaffold subunit (A subunit): acts as a structural platform.
- Regulatory subunit (B subunit): confers substrate specificity and subcellular localization.

The diversity of the B subunit family allows PP2A to form multiple holoenzymes with distinct functions, enabling it to regulate numerous cellular processes with high specificity.

== Function and mechanism ==
The central mechanisms in the regulation of most cellular processes include protein phosphorylation and dephosphorylation. PP2 enzymes specifically target proteins that are phosphorylated on serine and threonine residues. The dephosphorylation reaction typically requires water molecules and is catalyzed by a conserved active site in the PP2 enzyme.

The primary function of PP2 is to reverse the actions of kinases, which add phosphate groups to proteins. By removing phosphate groups, PP2 modulates the activity, location, and interaction of the target proteins, thereby controlling various aspects of cell behavior.

== Biological significance ==
Due to its role in controlling phosphorylation status, PP2A is implicated in various physiological and pathological conditions:

- Cancer: PP2A acts as a tumor suppressor. Its inhibition or mutation is associated with multiple cancers, including prostate, breast, lung, and leukemia.
- Neurodegeneration: abnormal PP2A activity has been linked to Alzheimer's disease due to dysregulated tau protein phosphorylation.
