= Actin remodeling =

Process of remodeling actin filaments

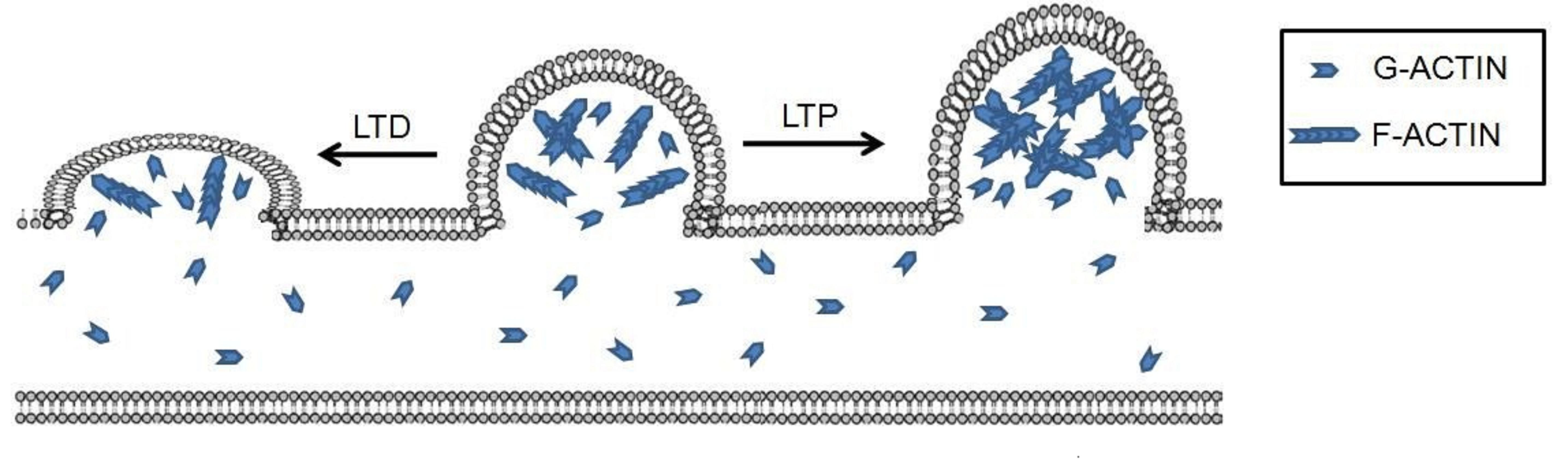
Actin Remodeling

Actin remodeling is the biochemical process that allows for the dynamic alterations of cellular organization. The remodeling of actin filaments occurs in a cyclic pattern on cell surfaces and exists as a fundamental aspect to cellular life. During the remodeling process, actin monomers polymerize in response to signaling cascades that stem from environmental cues. The cell's signaling pathways cause actin to affect intracellular organization of the cytoskeleton and often consequently, the cell membrane. Again triggered by environmental conditions, actin filaments break back down into monomers and the cycle is completed. Actin-binding proteins (ABPs) aid in the transformation of actin filaments throughout the actin remodeling process. These proteins account for the diverse structure and changes in shape of Eukaryotic cells. Despite its complexity, actin remodeling may result in complete cytoskeletal reorganization in under a minute.

== Structural composition of actin ==
Thin filament formation depicting the polymerization mechanism for converting G-actin to F-actin; note the hydrolysis of the ATP.

Actin remains one of the most abundant proteins in all of Eukarya and is an enzyme (ATPase) that gradually hydrolyzes ATP. It exists in two forms within eukaryotic cells: globular or G-actin and filament/filamentous or F-actin. Globular actin is the monomeric form of the protein while the filamentous actin is a linear polymer of globular subunits. The assembly of filamentous actin arises as a result of weak, noncovalent interactions between G-actin and appears in the arrangement of a two-stranded asymmetrical helical polymer.

The asymmetrical nature of F-actin allows for distinct binding specificities at each terminus. The terminus that presents an actin subunit with an exposed ATP binding site is commonly labeled the "(−) end". Whereas, the opposite end of the polymer that presents a cleft and lacks a free ATP binding site is referred to as the "(+) end". Additionally, the respective ends of the actin microfilament are often specified by their appearance under transmission electron microscopy during a technique known as "decoration", where the addition of myosin results in distinctive actin-myosin binding at each terminus. The terms "pointed end" and "barbed end" refer to the "(−) end" and "(+) end" respectively.

Within the cell, the concentrations of G-actin and F-actin continuously fluctuate. The assembly and disassembly of F-actin is regularly known as "actin tread-milling". In this process, G-actin subunits primarily add to the "barbed end" of the filamentous polymer. This end proves to be both more thermodynamically favored for the addition of G-actin and kinetically dynamic as well. Simultaneously, older G-actin monomers "fall off" of the pointed end of the microfilament. At the "pointed end" of the F-actin polymer, actin monomers are bound to ADP, which dissociates more readily and rapidly than ATP-bound actin, which is found at the "barbed end" of the polymer. Thus, in environments with high concentrations of free actin subunits, filamentous growth at the "barbed end" remains greater than that of the "pointed end". This "tread-milling", essentially exists as a simplified explanation of the actin remodeling process.

== Actin remodeling cycle ==
Cell surface (cortical) actin remodeling is a cyclic (9-step) process where each step is directly responsive to a cell signaling mechanism. Over the course of the cycle, actin begins as a monomer, elongates into a polymer with the help of attached actin-binding-proteins, and disassembles back into a monomer so the remodeling cycle may commence again. The dynamic function of actin remodeling is directly correlated to the immense variability of cell shape, structure, and behavior.

Cytoskeletal reorganization and cell motility in the form of actin remodeling to close a wound located on the human prostate.

Initiation

Consists of a number of different possible mechanisms that ultimately determine where and when actin filament elongation is to occur. In the mechanism that involves the uncapping of the barbed-end, diffusion-regulated actin polymerization of subunits bound to actin-monomer-sequestering proteins control initiation. Thymosin and Profilin both exist as actin-monomer-sequestering proteins that maintain the ability to limit spontaneous nucleation from occurring, thus halting the actin remodeling process and returning the cycle to its first step. Additionally, the cell utilizes polyphosphoinositides to aid in the removal of all known "barbed end" capping proteins.

Possible Mechanisms:

- De novo nucleation by the Arp2/3 complex, formins, and Spire that forms a trimer
- Barbed-end uncapping by the removal of barbed-end-capping proteins (CapZ, Hsp70, EPS8)
- Barbed-end uncapping by actin-binding-proteins that sever actin filaments

Elongation

Facilitated in vivo by polymerization promoters and barbed-end capping inhibitory proteins. The elongation phase begins when the concentration of short, F-actin polymers is significantly larger than at equilibrium. At this point, both termini accept the addition of new monomers (although primarily at the "barbed end") and the actin microfilament lengthens.

Termination

Involves the degradation of polyphosphoinositides and reactivation of "barbed end" capping proteins Hsp70 and CapZ, thereby reinitiating barbed-end capping and greatly diminishing elongation. Despite the presence of active capping proteins, certain inhibitors including profilin, formins, ENA and VASP promote elongation. These inhibitors may function in a variety of different methods, however, most employ the inhibition of subunit depolymerization and actin-depolymerizing actin-binding-proteins.

Branching amplification

Consists of the nucleation of new actin microfilaments from the existing sides of F-actin. The cell employs Arp2/3 complex to temporarily bind to existing polymers at a 70° angle. The Arp2/3 complex then elongates into a filamentous branch that proves essential for intracellular reorganization through cytoskeletal changes. This change in infrastructure may alter cell shape and behavior and is often used to transport vesicles, pathogens, or other related structures.

Actin filament crosslinking

Results in the overall stabilization of the actin filament network. The cell utilizes crosslinking proteins are various sizes to accomplish different means of stability within the binding network. Relatively small ABP's such as scruin, fimbrin, and espin function by solidifying actin filament bundles. Larger ABPs that exhibit coil-like qualities such as filament function in the promotion of orthogonal organization. As a whole, actin crosslinking provides framework for which the cell may transport signaling intermediates needed for other steps within the actin remodeling cycle.

Actin filament contraction and cargo motoring

Represents the ability for the actin filament network to react to environmental conditions and respond through various forms of vesicle and signal trafficking. Most commonly, the myosin protein exists as a "motor" that escorts cellular "cargo" throughout the cell. Myosin, primarily Myosin II, is also essential to the generation of contractile forces amongst the actin filaments.

Membrane attachment to actin network

Attachment of the actin-orthogonal network to the cell's membrane proves essential to the locomotion, shape, and mechanical function of the cell. The dynamic nature of a cell remains directly related to the actin-filament network's ability to respond to the contractile forces that result from environmental and internal cues.

Actin filament disassembly

The immobilization by interpenetration of actin filaments results from two distinct ABP families. The gelsolin protein family is believed to be the most efficient in the disruption of actin filaments and is considered a "strong severing protein". These proteins respond to an increase in Ca2+ and cap the "barbed end" of the recently severed F-actin. The increased level of Ca2+ may also destabilize the actin-filament network by interfering with the binding of crosslinking proteins. The ADF/Cofilin protein family also serves to severe actin-filament networks through the weak severing of actin networks. This form of weak severing does not tightly cap the "barbed ends" but does allow for the disassociation of actin monomers and thus the disassembly of F-actin.

Monomer sequestration that prevents spontaneous nucleation

Exists as the turnover point in the actin remodeling cycle. The proteins thymosin and profilin prevent the spontaneous nucleation of new actin trimers. The absence or inhibition of these proteins results in the cell's ability to commence the actin remodeling cycle and produce elongated F-actin.

== See also ==
- Actin
