= V-Src =

Tyrosine-protein kinase transforming protein Src

Identifiers
- Organism: Rous sarcoma virus
- Symbol: v-src
- Alt. symbols: pp60v-src
- Entrez: 1491925
- RefSeq (Prot): NP_056888.1
- UniProt: P00526

Other data
- EC number: 2.7.10.2
- Chromosome: viral: 0.01 - 0.01 Mb
Search for
- Structures: Swiss-model
- Domains: InterPro

v-Src is a gene found in Rous sarcoma virus (RSV) that encodes a tyrosine kinase that causes a type of cancer in chickens.

The src gene is oncogenic as it triggers uncontrolled growth in abnormal host cells. It was the first retroviral oncogene to be discovered. The src gene was taken up by RSV and incorporated into its genome conferring it with the advantage of being able to stimulate uncontrolled mitosis of host cells, providing abundant cells for fresh infection.

The src gene is not essential for RSV proliferation but it greatly increases virulence when present.

== Discovery ==
Francis Peyton Rous first proposed that viruses can cause cancer. He proved it in 1911 and was later awarded the Nobel prize in 1966. Chickens grow a tumor called a fibrosarcoma. Rous collected and ground up these sarcomas, and then centrifuged them to remove the solid material. Next, the remaining liquid mixture was injected into chicks. The chicks developed sarcomas. The causative agent in the liquid was a virus, this is now called the Rous sarcoma virus (RSV).

== Function ==
Further research done later on by others showed that RSV was a type of retrovirus. It was found that the v-Src gene in RSV is required for the formation of cancer.

A function for Src tyrosine kinases in normal cell growth was first demonstrated with the binding of family member p56lck to the cytoplasmic tail of the CD4 and CD8 co-receptors on T-cells. Src tyrosine kinases also transmit integrin-dependent signals central to cell movement and proliferation. Hallmarks of v-Src induced transformation are rounding of the cell and the formation of actin rich podosomes on the basal surface of the cell. These structures are correlated with increased invasiveness, a process thought to be essential for metastasis.

v-Src lacks the C-terminal inhibitory phosphorylation site (tyrosine-527), and is therefore constitutively active as opposed to normal Src (c-Src) which is only activated under certain circumstances where it is required (e.g. growth factor signaling). v-Src is therefore an instructive example of an oncogene whereas c-Src is a proto-oncogene.

The first sequence of v-Src was published in 1980 and the characterization of sites for tyrosine phosphorylation in the transforming protein of Rous sarcoma virus and its normal cellular homologue was published in 1981.

== See also ==
- c-Src
