= Chronic phase chronic myelogenous leukemia =

Stage of a blood cancer

Chronic phase chronic myelogenous leukemia is a phase of chronic myelogenous leukemia in which 5% or fewer of the cells in the blood and bone marrow are blast cells (immature blood cells). This phase may last from several months to several years, and there may be no symptoms of leukemia.
