= Bosutinib =

Chemical compound

Clinical data
- Trade names: Bosulif
- AHFS/Drugs.com: Monograph
- MedlinePlus: a613005
- License data: US DailyMed: Bosutinib
- Routes of administration: By mouth
- ATC code: L01EA04 (WHO)

Legal status
- Legal status: AU: S4 (Prescription only); UK: POM (Prescription only); US: ℞-only; EU: Rx-only

Pharmacokinetic data
- Protein binding: 94–96%
- Metabolism: By CYP3A4, to inactive metabolites
- Elimination half-life: 22.5±1.7 hours
- Excretion: Fecal (91.3%) and kidney (3%)

Identifiers
- IUPAC name: 4-[(2,4-dichloro-5-methoxyphenyl)amino]-6-methoxy-7-[3-(4-methylpiperazin-1-yl)propoxy]quinoline-3-carbonitrile
- CAS Number: 380843-75-4
- PubChem CID: 5328940
- IUPHAR/BPS: 5710
- DrugBank: DB06616
- ChemSpider: 4486102
- UNII: 5018V4AEZ0
- KEGG: D03252
- ChEBI: CHEBI:39112
- ChEMBL: ChEMBL288441
- CompTox Dashboard (EPA): DTXSID10861568
- ECHA InfoCard: 100.149.122

Chemical and physical data
- Formula: C_{26}H_{29}Cl_{2}N_{5}O_{3}
- Molar mass: 530.45 g·mol^{−1}
- 3D model (JSmol): Interactive image
- SMILES: Clc1c(OC)cc(c(Cl)c1)Nc4c(C#N)cnc3cc(OCCCN2CCN(CC2)C)c(OC)cc34
- InChI: InChI=1S/C26H29Cl2N5O3/c1-32-6-8-33(9-7-32)5-4-10-36-25-13-21-18(11-24(25)35-3)26(17(15-29)16-30-21)31-22-14-23(34-2)20(28)12-19(22)27/h11-14,16H,4-10H2,1-3H3,(H,30,31); Key:UBPYILGKFZZVDX-UHFFFAOYSA-N

Bosutinib, sold under the brand name Bosulif, is a small molecule BCR-ABL and src tyrosine kinase inhibitor used for the treatment of chronic myelogenous leukemia.

Originally synthesized by Wyeth, it is being developed by Pfizer.

Bosutinib is available as a generic medication.

== Medical uses ==
Bosutinib received US Food and Drug Administration (FDA) and EU European Medicines Agency approval in September 2012, and March 2013, respectively for the treatment of adults with Philadelphia chromosome-positive (Ph+) chronic myelogenous leukemia (CML) with resistance, or intolerance to prior therapy.

== Contraindications ==
Bosutinib has two known absolute contraindications, which are: known hypersensitivity to bosutinib and liver impairment.

== Interactions ==
Bosutinib is both a substrate and an inhibitor of P-glycoprotein (P-gp) and CYP3A4. Hence P-gp and CYP3A4 inhibitors may increase plasma levels of bosutinib. Likewise CYP3A4 inducers may reduce plasma concentrations of bosutinib. It may also alter the metabolism and uptake (into the GIT by means of its P-gp inhibitory effects) of other drugs that are substrates for P-gp and CYP3A4.

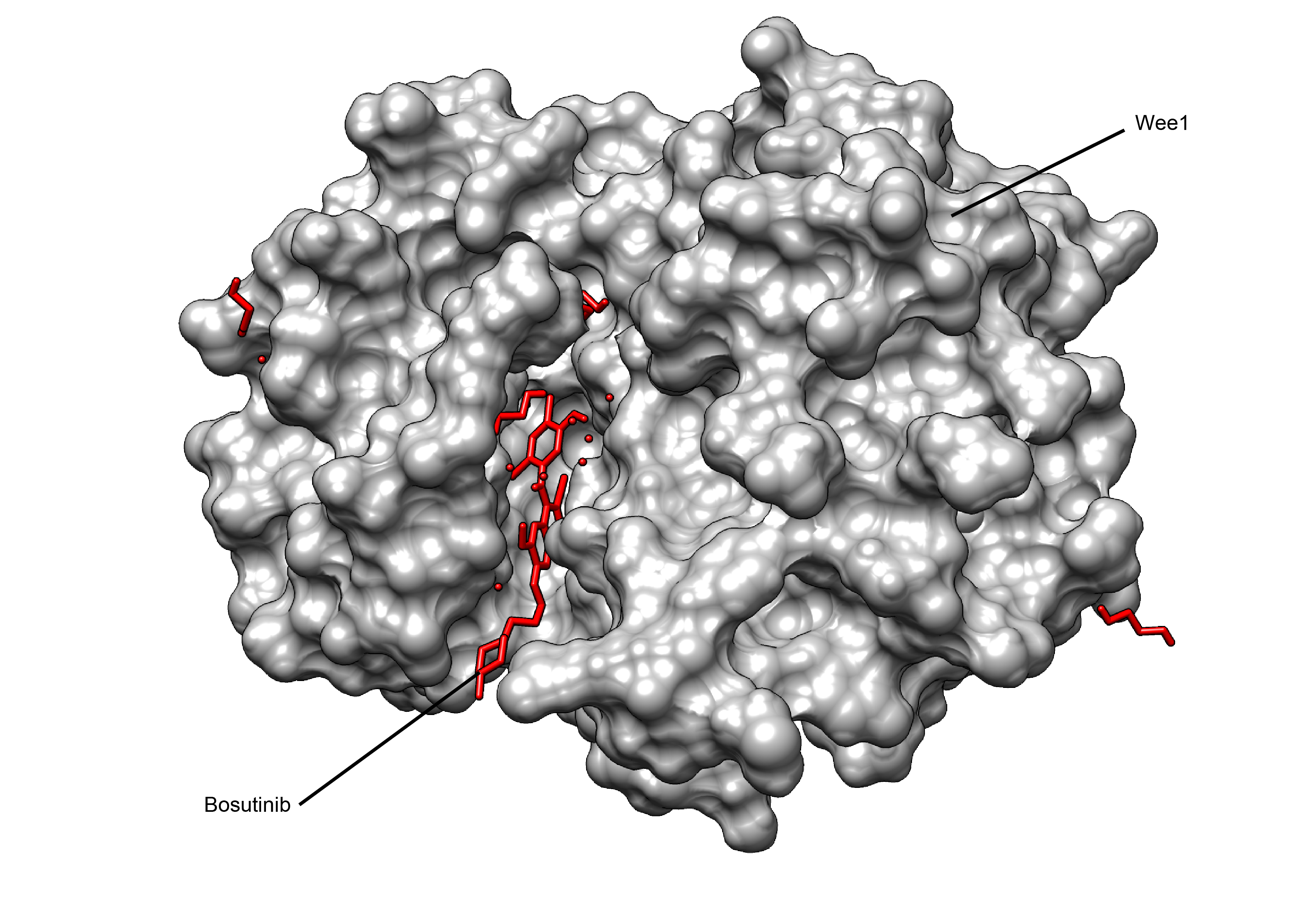
WEE1 kinase domain in complex with bosutinib.

== Mechanism ==
It is an ATP-competitive Bcr-Abl tyrosine-kinase inhibitor with an additional inhibitory effect on Src family kinases (including Src, Lyn and Hck). It has also shown activity against the receptors for platelet derived growth factor and vascular endothelial growth factor. Bosutinib inhibited 16 of 18 imatinib-resistant forms of Bcr-Abl expressed in murine myeloid cell lines, but did not inhibit T315I and V299L mutant cells.

== See also ==
- Discovery and development of Bcr-Abl tyrosine kinase inhibitors
