= Mir-19 microRNA precursor family =

Precursor microRNA family

mir-19 microRNA precursor family
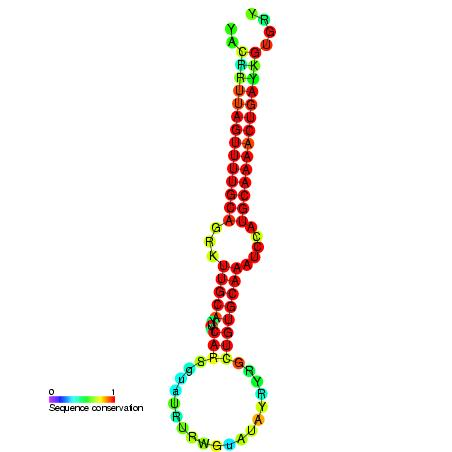
- Predicted secondary structure and sequence conservation of mir-19

Identifiers
- Symbol: mir-19
- Rfam: RF00245
- miRBase: MI0000073
- miRBase family: MIPF0000011

Other data
- RNA type: Gene; miRNA
- Domain: Eukaryota
- GO: GO:0035195 GO:0035068
- SO: SO:0001244
- PDB structures: PDBe

There are 89 known sequences today in the microRNA 19 (miR-19) family but it will change quickly. They are found in a large number of vertebrate species. The miR-19 microRNA precursor is a small non-coding RNA molecule that regulates gene expression. Within the human and mouse genome there are three copies of this microRNA that are processed from multiple predicted precursor hairpins:

- mouse:

* miR-19a on chromosome 14 (MI0000688)
* miR-19b-1 on chromosome 14 (MI0000718)
* miR-19b-2 on chromosome X (MI0000546)

- human:

* miR-19a on chromosome 13 (MI0000073)
* miR-19b-1 on chromosome 13 (MI0000074)
* miR-19b-2 on chromosome X (MI000075).

MiR-19 has now been predicted or experimentally confirmed (MIPF0000011). In this case the mature sequence is excised from the 3' arm of the hairpin precursor.

== Origins ==
MicroRNA are ubiquitous in higher eukaryotes, and show varying patterns of expression in specific cell types. MiR-19 has been identified in a diverse range of vertebrate animals including green anole (Anolis carolinensis), primates (gorilla, human, ...), cattle (Bos taurus), dog (Canis familiaris), Chinese hamster (Cricetulus griseus), zebrafish (Danio rerio), horse (Equus caballus), Takifugu rubripes, Tetraodon nigroviridis, chicken (Gallus gallus), gray short-tailed opossum (Monodelphis domestica), platypus (Ornithorhynchus anatinus), Japanese medaka (Oryzias latipes), African clawed frog (Xenopus laevis), Tasmanian devil (Sarcophilus harrisii), pig (Sus scrofa) and zebra finch (Taeniopygia guttata). In some of these species the presence of miR-19 microRNAs have been directly measured, in other species genes have been identified with sequences that are predicted to encode miR-19.

== Expression ==
MiR-17-92 cluster was identified to encode 6 single mature miRNA (miR-17, , miR-19, miR-20, miR-92, miR-106) containing the first oncogenic miRNA.

MicroRNA from miR-19 family can be expressed from:

* T-cell acute lymphoblastic leukemia
* B-cell lymphomas
* Cell lines
* Cerebellum
* Purkinje cells
* HeLa cells

Finally they have tissues-specific miRNA expression. These microRNA are considered as oncogenes which improve proliferation, inhibits apoptosis and induce tumor angiogenesis.
These miRNA are context-specific and they have different roles depending on where they are.

== miR-19a/b roles ==
=== Acute lymphoblastic leukemia ===
Ectopic expression of miR-19 represses CYLD expression, while miR-19 inhibitor treatment induces CYLD protein expression and decreases NF-kB expression in the downstream signaling pathway. Thus, miR-19, CYLD and NF-kB form a regulatory feedforward loop, which provides new clues for sustained activation of NF-kB in T-cell acute lymphoblastic leukemia.
MiR-19 is sufficient to induce T-cell lymphoblastic leukemia activating Notch1 and accelerate the disease. Its targets are:

* Bim (Bcl2L11) gene
* AMP-activated kinase (Prkaa1) gene
* E2F1 gene
* the tumour suppressor phosphatases PTEN
* PP2A (Ppp2r5e) gene
* Dock5 protein

MiR-19b coordinates a PI3K pathway acting on cell survival in lymphocytes contributing to leukaemogenesis.

This pathway is activated through PTEN loss and can contribute to reduce sensitivity to chemotherapy and (in T-ALL) may impact the effectiveness of therapeutic gamma-secretase inhibitors.

=== Primary central nervous system lymphoma ===
Baraniskin and al. study show that miR-21, miR-19, and miR-92a levels in cerebrospinal fluid (CSF) seems to be good biomarkers to diagnose a Primary central nervous system lymphoma (PCNSL). They also demonstrate that miRNAs in plasma are in a resistant form to intrinsic RNase activity, and there is a low RNase activity in the CSF.

=== B-cell lymphomas ===
MiR-19 has been identified as a key responsible for the oncogenic activity, reducing the tumor suppressor gene PTEN expression and activating AKT/mTOR pathway. This cluster might be important regulator on cancer and aging.
Mu and al. demonstrated that the expression of endogenous miR-17-92 is required to suppress apoptosis in Myc-driven B-cell lymphomas. More specifically, miR-19a and miR-19b are required and sufficient to recapitulate the oncogenic properties of the entire cluster. Using prediction algorithms, they found miR-19 targets to the pro-survival functions:

* PTEN tumor suppressor gene
* PTEN mRNA
* Sbf2 gene
* Bcl7a gene
* Rnf44 gene

=== Keratinocytes ===
In the cell response to stress, the most important is the post-transcriptional control of the important gene expression to cell survival and apoptosis. MiR-19 regulates the Ras homolog B (RhoB) expression in keratinocytes after ultraviolet (UV) radiation exposition. This phenomenon needs the binding of human antigen R (HuR) to the rhoB mRNA 3'-untranslated region. In this case, HuR acts positively on miRNA action. The interaction between HuR and miR-19 with rhoB is lost under UV treatment. Here, miR-19, linked to RhoB, acts like a protector against keratinocyte apoptosis. A 52-nucleotide-long sequence of the rhoB 3'-UTR spanning bases 818–870, containing the miR-19 and the HuR binding site was sufficient for UV regulation. This event is UV dependent!

=== Multiple myeloma ===
One study on multiple myeloma patients permitted to identified a selective up-regulation of miR-32 and the miR-17-92 cluster. MiR-19a and miR-19b were shown to down regulate SOCS-1 expression (a specific gene that inhibits IL-6 growth signaling). Therefore, miR-17-92 with miR-21, inhibits apoptosis and promotes cell survival.

=== Retinoblastoma ===
In this case, miR-17-92 cluster promotes retinoblastoma due to loss of Rb family members. The mouse retinal development need miR-17-92 over-expression with Rb and p107 deletion, but it occurred frequent emergence of retinoblastoma and metastasis to the brain.
Here, the cluster oncogenic function is not mediated by a miR-19/PTEN axis toward apoptosis suppression like in lymphoma or in leukemia models. MiR-17-92 increase the proliferative capacity of Rb/p107-deficient in retinal cells.
Moreover, the Rb family members deletion led to compensatory up-regulation of the cyclin-dependent kinase inhibitor p21Cip1.
Finally, the cluster over-expression counteracted p21Cip1 up-regulation, promotes proliferation and drove retinoblastoma formation.

=== Role in normal development of heart, lungs and immune system ===
Scientists observed that the loss of function of the miR-17-92 cluster is induced in smaller embryos and postnatal deaths. The specific role of this cluster in heart and lung development remains unclear, but the observations described above show that these miRNAs are normally highly expressed in embryonic lung and decrease with maturity. Moreover, transgenic expression of these miRNAs specifically in lung epithelium results in severe developmental defects with enhanced proliferation and inhibition of differentiation of epithelial cells.
Furthermore, mouse hematopoiesis occurring in the absence of miR-17-92 leads to an isolated defect in B cell development.

=== Role in the endothelial differentiation of stem cells ===
The miR-17-92 cluster containing miR-19 miRNA family is also involved into control endothelial cell functions and neo-vascularization. MiRNA cluster (miR-17, miR-18, miR-19 and miR-20) increased during the induction of endothelial cell differentiation in embryonic stem cells (tested on murine) or induce pluripotent stem cells. Even though this cluster regulates vascular integrity and angiogenesis, none of each members has a significant impact on the endothelial differentiation of pluripotent stem cells.

== miR-19a roles ==
=== Spinocerebellar ataxia type 1 ===
It has been showing that the 3' UTR of the ATXN1 gene contains 3 target sites for miR-19, and this microRNA shows moderate down regulation of reporter genes containing the ATXN1 3' UTR. Furthermore, it directly binds to the ATXN1 3´UTR to suppress the translation of ATXN1. ATXN1 is also regulated by miR-101, and miR-130.

=== Breast cancer ===
MiR-19 regulates tissue factor expression at a post-transcriptional level in breast cancer cells, providing a molecular basis for the selective expression of the tissue factor gene. Thanks to bioinformatics analyses, scientists predicted microRNA-Binding sites for miR-19, miR-20 and miR-106b in the 3'-UTR tissue factor transcript. Experiments confirmed that it negatively regulates gene expression in MCF-7 cells, and over-expression of miR-19 downregulates tissue factor expression in MDA-MB-231 cells (human breast cancer cell lines). The main action of miR-19 seems to inhibit protein translation of the tissue factor gene in less invasive breast cancer cells.

== miR-19b roles ==
=== Rheumatoid arthritis ===
MiR-19 also takes part in inflammatory responses enhancing or repressing pro-inflammatory mediators expression. It positively regulates Toll-like receptor signaling with Dicer1 deletion and miRNA depletion. MiR-19b is an important protagonist in this phenomenon, regulating positively NF-kB activity. MiRNA depletion inhibits cytokines production by NF-kB. This indicates that miRNA control of NF-kB signaling repressors thanks to its relief. Some important regulators of NF-kB signaling (like A20 (Tnfaip3), Cyld, and Cézanne (Otud7b)) is targeted by the miR-17-92 cluster.
Moreover, mir-19 targets some members of the Tnfaip3-ubiquitin editing complex (Tnfaip3/Itch/Tnip1/Rnf11). MiR-19 directly involved in the modulation of several NF-kB signaling negative regulators expression, indicating an important role for Rnf11 in the effect of miR-19b on NF-kB signaling.
Finally, miR-19b exacerbates the cells crucial inflammatory activation in rheumatoid arthritis disease.
