= Oncomir =

Family of oncogenic microRNAs

An oncomir (also oncomiR) is a microRNA (miRNA) that is associated with cancer. MicroRNAs are short RNA molecules about 22 nucleotides in length. Essentially, miRNAs specifically target certain messenger RNAs (mRNAs) to prevent them from coding for a specific protein. The dysregulation of certain microRNAs (oncomirs) has been associated with specific cancer forming (oncogenic) events. Many different oncomirs have been identified in numerous types of human cancers.

Oncomirs are associated with carcinogenesis, malignant transformation, and metastasis. Some oncomir genes are oncogenes, in that overexpression of the gene leads to cancerous growth. Other oncomir genes are tumor suppressors in a normal cell, so that underexpression of the gene leads to cancerous growth.

== General mechanism ==
Oncomirs cause cancer by down-regulating genes by both translational repression and mRNA destabilization mechanisms. These down-regulated genes may code for proteins that regulate the cell's life cycle.

Oncomirs may be at increased or decreased levels within cancerous tissue. In the case of increased oncomir activity, the oncomir is likely suppressing a tumor suppressor gene. In cases of underexpressed oncomirs, regulation is attenuated, allowing the cell to proliferate freely.

Viruses have also been found to have miRNA that mimic parts of natural regulatory human miRNA's. One example is the Epstein–Barr virus (EBV) which is associated with various types of cancer.

== History ==
The first link between miRNA and the growth of cancer was reported in 2002 when researchers observed a down-regulation of miR-15a and miR-16-1 in B-cell chronic lymphocytic leukemia patients. The term is a portmanteau, derived from "oncogenic" + "miRNA", coined by Scott M. Hammond in a 2006 paper characterizing OncomiR-1.

== Oncomir addiction ==
Certain tumors may be "addicted" to oncomirs, meaning that in order to remain tumors, a constant concentration of oncomirs must be present. This is demonstrated by inactivation of the oncomir miR-21. Mice expressing miR-21 contracted pre-B malignant lymphoid-like phenotype tumors. After inactivation of miR-21, the tumors completely regressed. This addiction is part of a more general phenomenon involving oncogenes, called oncogene addiction.

== Potential clinical uses of miRNA ==
Studies have been performed to evaluate the effectiveness of miRNAs as potential markers for cancers. MicroRNAs have shown promise in this area due to their stability and specificity to cells and tumors. A recent study investigated the use of miRNA as a biomarker in pancreatic ductal adenocarcinoma, a form of pancreatic cancer. The study analyzed RNA from biopsied pancreatic cysts to identify deviations in expression of miRNAs. The study found that 228 miRNAs were expressed differently relative to normal pancreatic cells. Included in the findings was an association between hepatocellular carcinoma and the upregulation of miR-92a, a member of OncomiR-1.

Extracellular microRNAs (exRNAs) may also be useful in clinical cancer detection. For example, in a study of cancer patients with a type of lymphoma called diffuse large B-cell lymphoma (DLBCL), serum levels of three miRNA's, miR-21, miR-155 and miR-210, were higher in cancer patients than in healthy controls. In particular, patients with high expression of miR-21 were more apt to have a relapse-free survival. (A table listing cancer type and the associated exRNA biomarker candidates can be found in Kosaka et al..)

== Identified oncomirs ==
=== The OncomiR-1 line ===
The OncomiR-1 cluster of miRNA's is one of the best characterized set of mammalian miRNA oncogenes. The oncomir-1 gene, also known as mir-17-92, encodes a single mRNA transcript that folds into six stem loops. Several cancer-associated oncomirs are generated from these stem loops, including miR-17, miR-18, miR-19a, miR-20, miR-19b, and miR-92. It has been shown that miRNA's from the OncomiR-1 line inhibit cell death, thus increased expression of oncomir-1 leads to the development of tumors. The oncomir-1 products inhibit expression of the transcription factor E2F1, which may impact apoptosis via the ARF-p53 pathway. It is predicted that there are several hundred target mRNAs for each miRNA, and therefore likely many additional targets for the OncomiR-1 line

=== OncomiR Resources and Databases ===
There are a few online resources and databases for collecting and annotating the oncogenic and tumor-suppressive miRNAs:

OncoMir Cancer Database Online database to access TCGA miRNA sequencing based expression data from over 10,000 tumor and normal tissues. OncomiRDB: a database for the experimentally verified oncogenic and tumor-suppressive microRNAs.

miRCancer: microRNA Cancer Association Database

HMDD: Human microRNA Disease Database

PhenomiR: a knowledgebase for microRNA expression in diseases and biological processes

Oncomir A collection of microRNA expression databases

=== Characteristics and mechanisms of some well defined oncomirs ===
==== miR-17 ====
MicroRNA-17, or miR-17, is a member of the OncomiR-1 family and one of the first miRNA to be identified as an oncogene. miR-17 has been confirmed to target the cell cycle transcription factor E2F1, a protein that not only promotes cell growth but also death.

==== miR-19 ====
MicroRNA-19, or miR-19, is a member of the OncomiR-1 family, and consists of three sub classifications in both humans and mice: mir-19a, mir-19b1 and miR-19b2. miR-19 has been shown to downregulate phosphatase and tensin homolog (PTEN) effectively increasing activity of the cellular survival-promoting signal pathway PI3K-Akt.

==== miR-21 ====
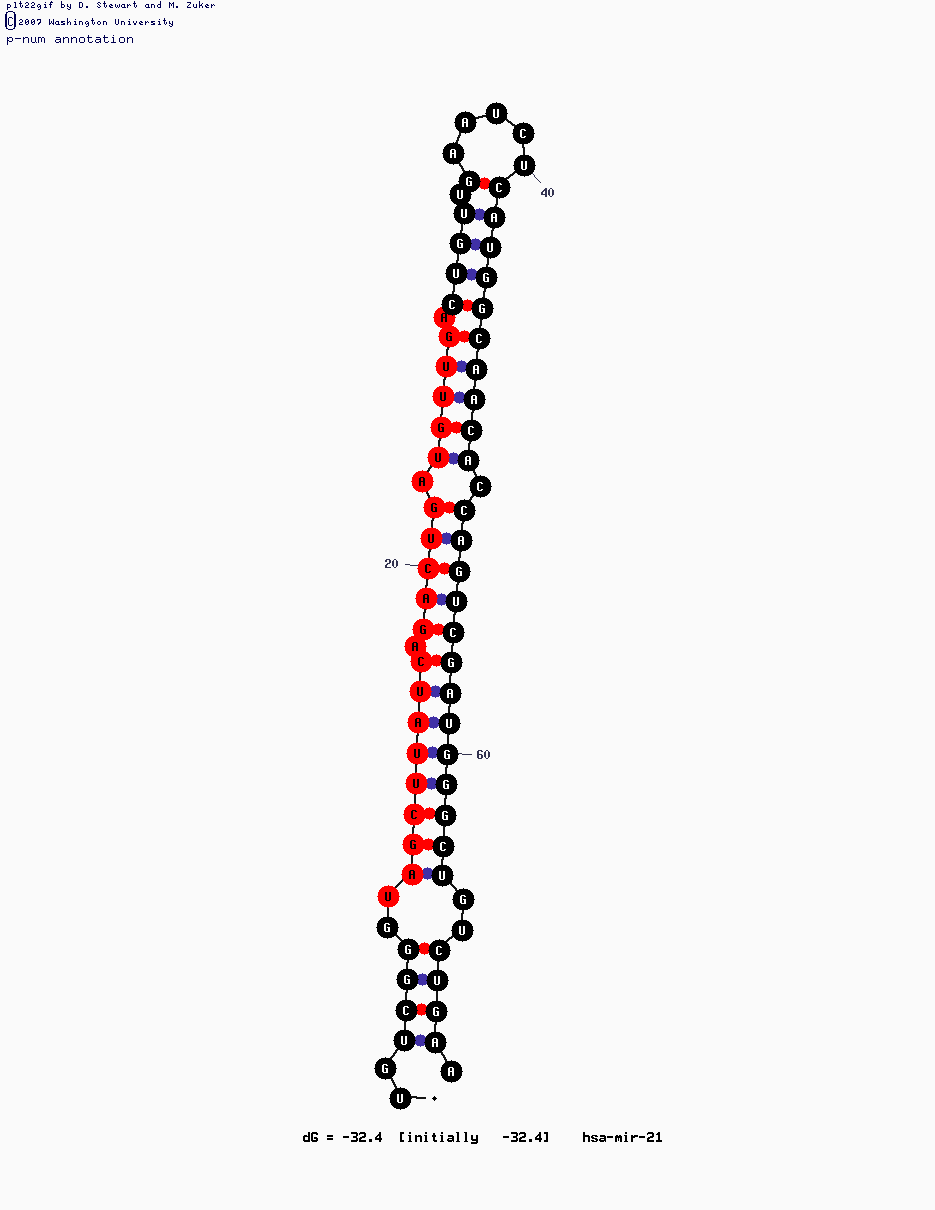
miR-21 Structure.

MicroRNA-21, or miR-21, a specific oncomir, becomes more abundant in human cancer. MicroRNA-21 elevation has been found in a wide variety of cancers, including glioblastoma, breast, colorectal, lung, pancreas, skin, liver, gastric, cervical, thyroid, and various lymphatic and hematopoietic cancers. It has been found to down-regulate the tumor suppressor PDCD4, thus aiding in the cancer's invasion, intravasation and metastasis.

==== miR-155 ====
MicroRNA-155, or miR-155, is a commonly over-expressed oncomir in human cancers. In human breast cancer, it has been identified to target the gene which encodes for a protein called suppressor of cytokine signaling 1 (SOCS1). Recent research suggests that miR-155 negatively regulates SOCS1, but may be a feasible target in breast cancer therapy.

==== miR-569 ====
Over expression of miR-569 in breast epithelial cells leads to downregulation of a tumor suppressor gene. Cell growth increases.

A strong association has been identified between miR-569 and 3q26.2, a chromosomal locus that is amplified in some breast cancers. Altered expression of the miR-569 gene has been demonstrated to affect growth and proliferation of breast epithelial cells. Ectopic expression of miR-569 resulted in tumor cell proliferation and metastasis. This occurs through miR-569 inhibition of TP53INP1, a tumor suppressor gene. In comparison to normal tissues and less malignant tumors, TP53INP1 occurs at lower levels in more invasive cancers, presumably in part due to the role played by miR-569.

=== List of identified oncomirs ===
- miR-15
- miR-16
- miR-17
- miR-18
- miR-19a
- miR-19b
- miR-20
- miR-21
- miR-92
- miR-125b
- miR-155
- miR-569
- miR-196b

== Anti-oncomirs ==
Anti-oncomirs are a class of miRNAs that negatively regulate oncogenes. Let-7 is the first identified anti-oncomir that functions as a "post-transcriptional-gatekeeper" of certain genes that control cell growth. For example, in lung cancer some oncogenes are down-regulated by Let-7, which functions to maintain normal cell progression. Other anti-oncomirs, including miR-143 and miR-145, have been shown to down-regulate a wide range of human cancer cell lines. Tumor formation has been observed when miR-143 and miR-145 are down-regulated, particularly in colon and gastric cancer cells. When expressed in colon cancer cells, miR-143 and miR-145 are able to slow growth at the translational level by interfering with MAPK7, an enzyme responsible for cell growth. As an avenue of therapeutic research, chemical devitalization (i.e., artificial modification) of miR-143 and miR-145 may prove to be more effective version of their natural counterparts. Specifically, modified miRNAs may be imparted with increased resistance to nucleases that would otherwise break down the miRNAs.

== See also ==
- Cancer
- Carcinogenesis
- Extracellular RNA (exRNA)
- microRNA (miRNA)
