= Mir-504 microRNA precursor family =

mir-504

Identifiers
- Symbol: mir-504
- Rfam: RF00939
- miRBase family: MIPF0000437

Other data
- RNA type: microRNA
- Domain: Eukaryota;
- PDB structures: PDBe

In molecular biology mir-504 microRNA is a short RNA molecule. MicroRNAs function to regulate the expression levels of other genes by several mechanisms.

== See also ==
- MicroRNA
