= Mir-361 microRNA precursor family =

mir-361

Identifiers
- Symbol: mir-361
- Rfam: RF00744
- miRBase family: MIPF0000172

Other data
- RNA type: microRNA
- Domain(s): Eukaryota;
- PDB structures: PDBe

In molecular biology mir-361 microRNA is a short RNA molecule. MicroRNAs function to regulate the expression levels of other genes by several mechanisms. For example, miR-361-5p might act as a suppressor in triple-negative breast cancer (TNBC) by targeting RQCD1 to inhibit the EGFR/PI3K/Akt signaling pathway.

== See also ==
- MicroRNA
