= Mir-363 microRNA precursor family =

mir-363

Identifiers
- Symbol: mir-363
- Rfam: RF01898
- miRBase family: MIPF0000138

Other data
- RNA type: microRNA
- Domain: Eukaryota;
- PDB structures: PDBe

In molecular biology mir-363 microRNA is a short RNA molecule. MicroRNAs function to regulate the expression levels of other genes by several mechanisms.

== See also ==
- MicroRNA
