= Mir-489 microRNA precursor family =

Short RNA molecule

mir-489

Identifiers
- Symbol: mir-489
- Rfam: RF00698
- miRBase family: MIPF0000111

Other data
- RNA type: microRNA
- Domain: Eukaryota;
- PDB structures: PDBe

In molecular biology mir-489 microRNA is a short RNA molecule, encoded by the MIR489 gene. MicroRNAs function is to regulate the expression levels of other genes by several mechanisms.

== Function ==
microRNAs (miRNAs) are short (20-24 nt) non-coding RNAs that are involved in post-transcriptional regulation of gene expression in multicellular organisms by affecting both the stability and translation of mRNAs. miRNAs are transcribed by RNA polymerase II as part of capped and polyadenylated primary transcripts (pri-miRNAs) that can be either protein-coding or non-coding. The primary transcript is cleaved by the Drosha ribonuclease III enzyme to produce an approximately 70-nt stem-loop precursor miRNA (pre-miRNA), which is further cleaved by the cytoplasmic Dicer ribonuclease to generate the mature miRNA and antisense miRNA star (miRNA*) products. The mature miRNA is incorporated into an RNA-induced silencing complex (RISC), which recognizes target mRNAs through imperfect base pairing with the miRNA and most commonly results in translational inhibition or destabilization of the target mRNA. The RefSeq represents the predicted microRNA stem-loop. miR-489 acts as tumor suppressor miRNA in breast cancer by inhibiting various oncogenic signaling pathway. It has been demonstrated miR-489 target HER2 and LAPTM4b by directly binding to their 3'UTR. Role of miR-489 has been studied in autochatothus MMTV-Her2 mouse model.

== See also ==
- MicroRNA
