= Mir-786 microRNA precursor family =

RNA molecule

mir-786

Identifiers
- Symbol: mir-786
- Rfam: RF00895
- miRBase family: MIPF0000363

Other data
- RNA type: microRNA
- Domain: Eukaryota;
- PDB structures: PDBe

In molecular biology, mir-786 microRNA is a short RNA molecule. MicroRNAs function to regulate the expression levels of other genes by several mechanisms.

== Regulation of defecation ==
miR-786 is involved in control of the defecation motor programme, together with miR-240. These two miRNAs are necessary for normal defecation programme rhythmicity, and average cycle time has been found to be increased in miR-24/786 C. elegans. Decreased cycle times have conversely been observed with miR-52 knockout in C. elegans.

== See also ==
- MicroRNA
