= Mir-193 microRNA precursor family =

mir-193

Identifiers
- Symbol: mir-193
- Rfam: RF01895
- miRBase family: 6

Other data
- RNA type: microRNA
- Domain: Eukaryota;
- PDB structures: PDBe

In molecular biology mir-193 microRNA is a short RNA molecule. MicroRNAs function to regulate the expression levels of other genes by several mechanisms.

== See also ==
- MicroRNA
