= Mir-135 microRNA precursor family =

mir-135 microRNA precursor family
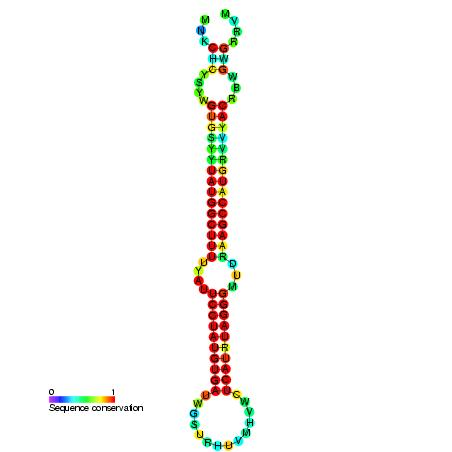
- Predicted secondary structure and sequence conservation of mir-135

Identifiers
- Symbol: mir-135
- Rfam: RF00246
- miRBase: MI0000452
- miRBase family: MIPF0000028

Other data
- RNA type: Gene; miRNA
- Domain(s): Eukaryota
- GO: GO:0035195 GO:0035068
- SO: SO:0001244
- PDB structures: PDBe

The miR-135 microRNA precursor is a small non-coding RNA that is involved in regulating gene expression. It has been shown to be expressed in human, mouse and rat. miR-135 has now been predicted or experimentally confirmed in a wide range of vertebrate species (MIPF0000028). Precursor microRNAs are ~70 nucleotides in length and are processed by the Dicer enzyme to produce the shorter 21-24 nucleotide mature sequence. In this case the mature sequence is excised from the 5' arm of the hairpin.

== Targets of miR-135 ==
- Nagel et al.. showed that miR-135a and b target the 3' untranslated region of the APC gene.
