= Mir-455 microRNA precursor family =

mir-455

Identifiers
- Symbol: mir-455
- Rfam: RF00709
- miRBase family: MIPF0000129

Other data
- RNA type: microRNA
- Domain: Eukaryota;
- PDB structures: PDBe

In molecular biology mir-455 microRNA is a short RNA molecule. MicroRNAs function to regulate the expression levels of other genes by several mechanisms.

== See also ==
- MicroRNA
