= Mir-330 microRNA precursor family =

RNA molecule

mir-330

Identifiers
- Symbol: mir-330
- Rfam: RF00770
- miRBase family: MIPF0000200

Other data
- RNA type: microRNA
- Domain(s): Eukaryota;
- PDB structures: PDBe

In molecular biology mir-330 microRNA is a short RNA molecule. MicroRNAs function to regulate the expression levels of other genes by several mechanisms.

== See also ==
- MicroRNA
