= Mir-339 microRNA precursor family =

mir-339

Identifiers
- Symbol: mir-339
- Rfam: RF00763
- miRBase family: MIPF0000193

Other data
- RNA type: microRNA
- Domain: Eukaryota;
- PDB structures: PDBe

In molecular biology mir-339 microRNA is a short RNA molecule. MicroRNAs function to regulate the expression levels of other genes by several mechanisms. miR-339-5p expression was associated with overall survival in breast cancer.

== See also ==
- MicroRNA
