= Mir-584 microRNA precursor family =

RNA molecule

mir-584

Identifiers
- Symbol: mir-584
- Rfam: RF01016
- miRBase family: MIPF0000533

Other data
- RNA type: microRNA
- Domain(s): Eukaryota;
- PDB structures: PDBe

In molecular biology mir-584 microRNA is a short RNA molecule. MicroRNAs function to regulate the expression levels of other genes by several mechanisms.

== See also ==
- MicroRNA
