= Mir-558 microRNA precursor family =

mir-558

Identifiers
- Symbol: mir-558
- Rfam: RF01021
- miRBase family: MIPF0000538

Other data
- RNA type: microRNA
- Domain(s): Eukaryota;
- PDB structures: PDBe

In molecular biology mir-558 microRNA is a short RNA molecule. MicroRNAs function to regulate the expression levels of other genes by several mechanisms.

== See also ==
- MicroRNA
