= Mir-BART1 microRNA precursor family =

mir-BART1 microRNA precursor family
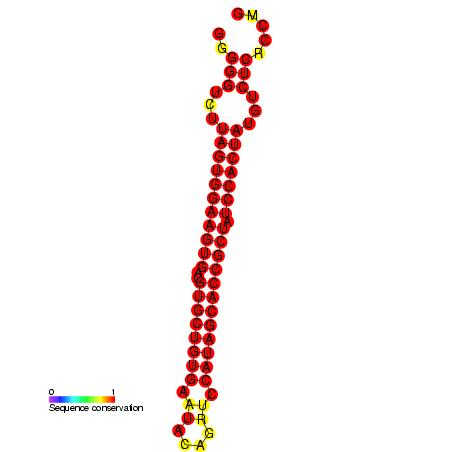
- Predicted secondary structure and sequence conservation of mir-BART1

Identifiers
- Symbol: mir-BART1
- Rfam: RF00363
- miRBase: MI0001067
- miRBase family: MIPF0000325

Other data
- RNA type: Gene; miRNA
- Domain: Viruses
- GO: GO:0035195 GO:0035068
- SO: SO:0001244
- PDB structures: PDBe

The mir-BART1 microRNA precursor is found in Human herpesvirus 4 (Epstein–Barr virus) and Cercopithicine herpesvirus 15. mir-BART1 is found in all stages of infection but expression is significantly elevated in the lytic stage. In Epstein-Barr virus, mir-BART1 is found in the intronic regions of the BART (Bam HI-A region rightward transcript) gene whose function is unknown. The mature sequence is excised from the 5' arm of the hairpin.
