= MiR160 microRNA precursor family =

miR160 microRNA precursor family
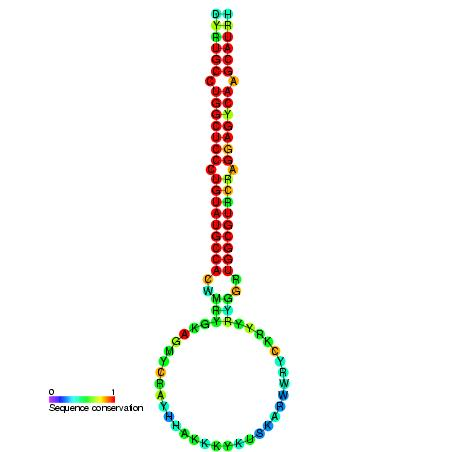
- Predicted secondary structure and sequence conservation of miR160

Identifiers
- Symbol: miR160
- Rfam: RF00247
- miRBase: MI0000190
- miRBase family: MIPF0000032

Other data
- RNA type: Gene; miRNA
- Domain: Eukaryota
- GO: GO:0035195 GO:0035068
- SO: SO:0001244
- PDB structures: PDBe

In molecular biology, miR160 is a microRNA that has been predicted or experimentally confirmed in a range of plant species including Arabidopsis thaliana (mouse-ear cress) and Oryza sativa (rice). miR-160 is predicted to bind complementary sites in the untranslated regions of auxin response factor genes to regulate their expression. The hairpin precursors (represented here) are predicted based on base pairing and cross-species conservation; their extents are not known. In this case, the mature sequence is excised from the 5' arm of the hairpin.

Specifically, three of the 23 Arabidopsis thaliana AUXIN RESPONSE FACTOR (ARF) genes—ARF10, ARF16, and ARF17—are post-transcriptionally regulated by miR160. Experimental evidence demonstrates that miR160-mediated regulation of these transcription factors is required for normal plant development.

When ARF17 is engineered to be resistant to miR160-mediated cleavage, plants exhibit multiple developmental defects, demonstrating the importance of miR160 regulation of auxin response pathways. Similar experiments with another target, ARF10, showed that repression by miR160 is required for proper seed germination and post-embryonic development.
