= Mir-500 microRNA precursor family =

Type of RNA molecule

mir-500

Identifiers
- Symbol: mir-500
- Rfam: RF01903
- miRBase family: MIPF0000139

Other data
- RNA type: microRNA
- Domain: Eukaryota;
- PDB structures: PDBe

In molecular biology mir-500 microRNA is a short RNA molecule. MicroRNAs function to regulate the expression levels of other genes by several mechanisms.

== See also ==
- MicroRNA
