= Mir-542 microRNA precursor family =

mir-542

Identifiers
- Symbol: mir-542
- Rfam: RF00755
- miRBase family: MIPF0000185

Other data
- RNA type: microRNA
- Domain: Eukaryota;
- PDB structures: PDBe

In molecular biology mir-542 microRNA is a short RNA molecule. MicroRNAs function to regulate the expression levels of other genes by several mechanisms.

== See also ==
- MicroRNA
