= Mir-503 microRNA precursor family =

mir-503

Identifiers
- Symbol: mir-503
- Rfam: RF00753
- miRBase family: MIPF0000183

Other data
- RNA type: microRNA
- Domain: Eukaryota;
- PDB structures: PDBe

In molecular biology mir-503 microRNA is a short RNA molecule. MicroRNAs function to regulate the expression levels of other genes by several mechanisms.

== See also ==
- MicroRNA
