= Mir-491 microRNA precursor family =

mir-491

Identifiers
- Symbol: mir-491
- Rfam: RF00862
- miRBase family: MIPF0000319

Other data
- RNA type: microRNA
- Domain(s): Eukaryota;
- PDB structures: PDBe

In molecular biology mir-491 microRNA is a short RNA molecule. MicroRNAs function to regulate the expression levels of other genes by several mechanisms.

== See also ==
- MicroRNA
