= Mir-448 microRNA precursor family =

Biological molecule

mir-448

Identifiers
- Symbol: mir-448
- Rfam: RF00723
- miRBase family: MIPF0000149

Other data
- RNA type: microRNA
- Domain(s): Eukaryota;
- PDB structures: PDBe

In molecular biology mir-448 microRNA is a short RNA molecule. MicroRNAs function to regulate the expression levels of other genes by several mechanisms.

== See also ==
- MicroRNA
