= B-cell CLL/lymphoma =

Family of genes

B-cell CLL/lymphoma refers to a family of cancers associated with certain types of lymphoma and leukemia.

Although named for B-cell chronic lymphocytic leukemia, they can be associated with other malignancies.

Members include:

- CCND1 (also known as "BCL1")
- BCL2
- BCL3
- BCL5
- BCL6
- BCL6B
- BCL7A
- BCL7B
- BCL7C
- BCL8
- BCL9
- BCL10
- BCL11A
- BCL11B

== See also ==
- Bcl-2 family
