= Mir-23 microRNA precursor family =

Precursor microRNA family

mir-23

Identifiers
- Symbol: mir-23
- Rfam: RF00642
- miRBase family: 22

Other data
- RNA type: microRNA
- Domain: Eukaryota;
- PDB structures: PDBe

In molecular biology mir-23 microRNA is a short RNA molecule. MicroRNAs function to regulate the expression levels of other genes by several mechanisms.

== See also ==
- MicroRNA
