= MiR399 microRNA precursor family =

Short, regulatory miRNA molecule

miR399 microRNA precursor family
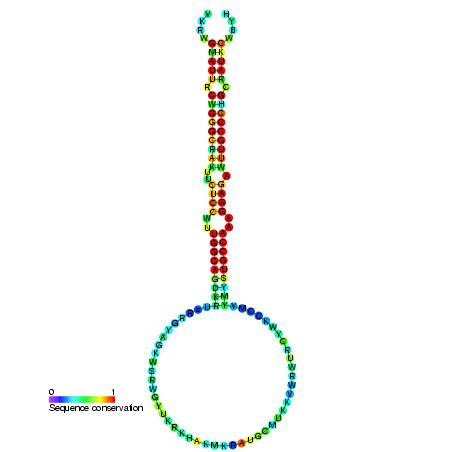
- Predicted secondary structure and sequence conservation of miR399

Identifiers
- Symbol: miR399
- Rfam: RF00445
- miRBase: MI0001020
- miRBase family: MIPF0000015

Other data
- RNA type: microRNA
- Domain: Viridiplantae
- GO: GO:0035195 GO:0035068
- SO: SO:0001244
- PDB structures: PDBe

miR399 is a conserved plant microRNA that plays a central role in the regulation of phosphate homeostasis. The miR399 regulatory pathway is strongly induced during phosphate starvation and functions primarily by repressing the expression of the ubiquitin-conjugating enzyme gene PHO2 (also known as UBC24), thereby modulating phosphate uptake and distribution in plants.

== Function ==
miR399 is strongly induced in plants exposed to low phosphate conditions. The mature miRNA targets multiple binding sites located in the 5′ untranslated region of the PHO2 transcript, promoting its degradation and thereby altering phosphate transport and accumulation.

Genetic and molecular studies established that the transcription factor PHR1 acts upstream of miR399 in the phosphate starvation signaling network. In Arabidopsis thaliana, miR399 expression is strongly reduced in phr1 mutants, placing the miR399–PHO2 regulatory module downstream of PHR1 in the phosphate-signaling pathway.

== Long-distance signaling ==
miR399 also functions as a systemic signal that coordinates phosphate status between plant organs. Under phosphate starvation, miR399 accumulates in the shoot and is transported through the phloem to the root, where it represses PHO2 expression and enhances phosphate uptake. Grafting experiments demonstrated that miR399 produced in shoots can move into roots and retain biological activity, establishing miR399 as a phloem-mobile regulatory RNA.

== Target mimicry ==
The activity of miR399 is regulated by a non-coding RNA named IPS1 (INDUCED BY PHOSPHATE STARVATION 1). IPS1 contains sequence complementarity to miR399 but includes a mismatched loop at the predicted cleavage site. This prevents RNA cleavage and instead allows IPS1 transcripts to bind and sequester miR399 molecules. This mechanism, termed target mimicry, inhibits miR399 activity and modulates phosphate homeostasis.

== Evolution and conservation ==
The miR399–PHO2 regulatory module is conserved across many plant species. Orthologs of PHO2 containing multiple miR399 target sites have been identified in diverse flowering plants, indicating that miR399-mediated regulation of phosphate homeostasis represents an ancient and conserved signaling mechanism.

Recent studies in crop species such as maize have shown that the miR399–PHO2 pathway interacts with developmental regulators to coordinate phosphate availability with plant growth and reproductive development.

== See also ==
- MicroRNA
