= Mir-14 microRNA precursor family =

Precursor microRNA family

mir-14

Identifiers
- Symbol: mir-14
- Rfam: RF00752
- miRBase family: 7

Other data
- RNA type: microRNA
- Domain(s): Eukaryota;
- PDB structures: PDBe

In molecular biology mir-14 microRNA is a short RNA molecule. MicroRNAs function to regulate the expression levels of other genes by several mechanisms.

== See also ==
- MicroRNA
