= Mir-275 microRNA precursor family =

mir-275

Identifiers
- Symbol: mir-275
- Rfam: RF00757
- miRBase family: 3

Other data
- RNA type: microRNA
- Domain(s): Eukaryota;
- PDB structures: PDBe

In molecular biology mir-275 microRNA is a short RNA molecule. MicroRNAs function to regulate the expression levels of other genes by several mechanisms.

== See also ==
- MicroRNA
