= Mir-340 microRNA precursor family =

mir-340

Identifiers
- Symbol: mir-340
- Rfam: RF00761
- miRBase family: MIPF0000191

Other data
- RNA type: microRNA
- Domain(s): Eukaryota;
- PDB structures: PDBe

In molecular biology mir-340 microRNA is a short RNA molecule. MicroRNAs function to regulate the expression levels of other genes by several mechanisms.

== See also ==
- MicroRNA
