= Mir-71 microRNA precursor family =

mir-71

Identifiers
- Symbol: mir-71
- Rfam: RF00832
- miRBase family: 7

Other data
- RNA type: microRNA
- Domain: Eukaryota;
- PDB structures: PDBe

In molecular biology mir-71 microRNA is a short RNA molecule. MicroRNAs function to regulate the expression levels of other genes by several mechanisms.

== See also ==
- MicroRNA
