= Mir-337 microRNA precursor family =

mir-337

Identifiers
- Symbol: mir-337
- Rfam: RF00765
- miRBase family: MIPF0000195

Other data
- RNA type: microRNA
- Domain(s): Eukaryota;
- PDB structures: PDBe

In molecular biology, mir-337 microRNA is a short RNA molecule, called MicroRNA. It is used to suppress the invasion and migration of breast cancer cells.

== See also ==
- MicroRNA
