= Mir-612 microRNA precursor family =

Short non-coding RNA molecule

mir-612

Identifiers
- Symbol: mir-612
- Rfam: RF00959
- miRBase family: MIPF0000464

Other data
- RNA type: microRNA
- Domain(s): Eukaryota
- PDB structures: PDBe

mir-612 microRNA is a short non-coding RNA molecule belonging both to the family of microRNAs and to that of small interfering RNAs (siRNAs). MicroRNAs function to regulate the expression levels of other genes by several mechanisms, whilst siRNAs are involved primarily with the RNA interference (RNAi) pathway. siRNAs have been linked through some members to the regulation of cancer cell growth, specifically in prostate adenocarcinoma.

== miR-612 and p53 ==
The microRNA miR-2185 has a strong inhibitory effect on the tumour suppressor protein p53, acting through targeting its 3'UTR. MiR-612 is of the same seed sequence as miR-2185 but, despite this, is yet to be identified as a p53 inhibitor.

== See also ==
- MicroRNA
