= Mir-423 microRNA precursor family =

Short RNA molecule

mir-423

Identifiers
- Symbol: mir-423
- Rfam: RF00870
- miRBase family: MIPF0000329

Other data
- RNA type: microRNA
- Domain: Eukaryota;
- PDB structures: PDBe

Mir-423 microRNA is a short RNA molecule. MicroRNAs function to regulate the expression levels of other genes by several mechanisms.

== See also ==
- MicroRNA
