= Mir-46/mir-47/mir-281 microRNA precursor family =

MRNA precuror family

mir-46/mir-47/mir-281 microRNA precursor family
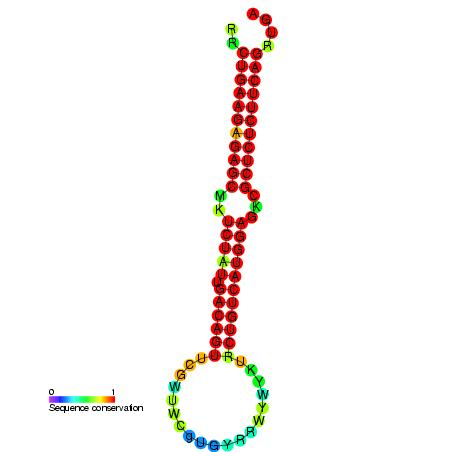
- Predicted secondary structure and sequence conservation of mir-46

Identifiers
- Symbol: mir-46
- Rfam: RF00249
- miRBase: MI0000017
- miRBase family: MIPF0000087

Other data
- RNA type: Gene; miRNA
- Domain: Eukaryota
- GO: GO:0035195 GO:0035068
- SO: SO:0001244
- PDB structures: PDBe

In molecular biology, mir-46 (MI0000017) and mir-47 (MI0000018) are microRNA expressed in C. elegans from related hairpin precursor sequences. The predicted hairpin precursor sequences for Drosophila mir-281 (MI0000366, MI0000370) are also related and, hence, belong to this family. The hairpin precursors (represented here) are predicted based on base pairing and cross-species conservation; their extents are not known. In this case, the mature sequences are expressed from the 3' arms of the hairpin precursors.
