= Mir-305 microRNA precursor family =

Short RNA molecule

mir-305

Identifiers
- Symbol: mir-305
- Rfam: RF00732
- miRBase family: MIPF0000158

Other data
- RNA type: microRNA
- Domain(s): Eukaryota;
- PDB structures: PDBe

In molecular biology mir-305 microRNA is a short RNA molecule. MicroRNAs function to regulate the expression levels of other genes by several mechanisms.

== See also ==
- MicroRNA
