= Mir-52 microRNA precursor family =

Micro RNA precuror family

mir-52

Identifiers
- Symbol: mir-52
- Rfam: RF00734
- miRBase family: MIPF0000160

Other data
- RNA type: microRNA
- Domain: Eukaryota;
- PDB structures: PDBe

In molecular biology mir-52 microRNA is a short RNA molecule. MicroRNAs function to regulate the expression levels of other genes by several mechanisms.

== See also ==
- MicroRNA
