= Mir-484 microRNA precursor family =

mir-484

Identifiers
- Symbol: mir-484
- Rfam: RF00783
- miRBase family: MIPF0000219

Other data
- RNA type: microRNA
- Domain(s): Eukaryota;
- PDB structures: PDBe

In molecular biology mir-484 microRNA is a short RNA molecule. MicroRNAs function to regulate the expression levels of other genes by several mechanisms. The precursor hairpin of miR-484 is transcribed directly and contains a 7-methylguanylated cap. The biogenesis of miR-484 is independent of Drosha.

== See also ==
- MicroRNA
