= Mir-154 microRNA precursor family =

Short RNA molecule

mir-154

Identifiers
- Symbol: mir-154
- Rfam: RF00641
- miRBase family: 10

Other data
- RNA type: microRNA
- Domain: Eukaryota;
- PDB structures: PDBe

In molecular biology mir-154 microRNA is a short RNA molecule. MicroRNAs function to regulate the expression levels of other genes by several mechanisms.

== See also ==
- MicroRNA
