= Mir-351 microRNA precursor family =

mir-351

Identifiers
- Symbol: mir-351
- Rfam: RF00805
- miRBase family: MIPF0000244

Other data
- RNA type: microRNA
- Domain: Eukaryota;
- PDB structures: PDBe

In molecular biology mir-351 microRNA is a short RNA molecule. MicroRNAs function to regulate the expression levels of other genes by several mechanisms.

== See also ==
- MicroRNA
