= Mir-345 microRNA precursor family =

mir-345

Identifiers
- Symbol: mir-345
- Rfam: RF01044
- miRBase family: MIPF0000189

Other data
- RNA type: microRNA
- Domain(s): Eukaryota;
- PDB structures: PDBe

In molecular biology mir-345 microRNA is a short RNA molecule. MicroRNAs function to regulate the expression levels of other genes by several mechanisms.

== See also ==
- MicroRNA
