= Mir-549 microRNA precursor family =

mir-549

Identifiers
- Symbol: mir-549
- Rfam: RF00965
- miRBase family: MIPF0000470

Other data
- RNA type: microRNA
- Domain: Eukaryota;
- PDB structures: PDBe

In molecular biology mir-549 microRNA is a microRNA, i.e. a short RNA molecule. The function of microRNAs is to regulate the expression levels of other genes by several mechanisms.
