= Tensin =

Family of proteins

Tensins are a family of proteins. Tensin-1 (then called tensin) was first identified as a 220 kDa multi-domain protein localized to the specialized regions of plasma membrane called integrin-mediated focal adhesions (which are formed around a transmembrane core of an αβ integrin heterodimer). Genome sequencing and comparison have revealed the existence of four tensin-encoding genes in humans. These genes appear to be related by ancient instances of gene duplication.

Tensin binds to actin filaments and contains a phosphotyrosine-binding (PTB) domain at the C-terminus, which interacts with the cytoplasmic tail of β integrins. These interactions allow tensin to link actin filaments to integrin receptors. Several factors induce tyrosine phosphorylation of tensin. Thus, tensin functions as a platform for assembly and disassembly of signaling complexes at focal adhesions by recruiting tyrosine-phosphorylated signaling molecules, and also by providing interaction sites for other proteins. Haynie, by contrast, argues in a review of tensin structure and function that experimental evidence for the specific association of tensin with actin filaments is inconclusive at best. Recent work has also demonstrated TNS3 and TNS4 to exhibit force-dependent recruitment to keratin network in epithelial cells, highlighting its novel role in mechanotransduction. It is beyond reasonable doubt, however, that tensin 1, tensin 2 and tensin 3 each contains a protein tyrosine phosphatase (PTP) domain near the N-terminus. The PTP domain is unlikely to be active in tensin 1, owing to mutation of the essential nucleophilic cysteine in the signature motif to asparagine. Nevertheless, phosphatidylinositol-3,4,5-trisphosphate 3-phosphatase, the well-studied tumor suppressor that is better known as PTEN, gets its name from homology with PTPs and tensin 1. More detailed structure comparisons have revealed that tensins 1-3, PTEN, auxilin and other proteins in animals, plants and fungi comprise a PTP-C2 superdomain. An integrated PTP domain and C2 domain, the PTP-C2 superdomain came into existence over 1 billion years ago and has functioned as a single heritable unit since then.

The first tensin cDNA sequence was isolated from chicken. Analysis of knockout mice has demonstrated critical roles of tensin in renal function, muscle regeneration, and cell migration. Evidence is now emerging to suggest tensin is an important component linking the ECM, the actin cytoskeleton, and signal transduction. Therefore, tensin and its downstream signaling molecules may be targets for therapeutic interventions in renal disease, wound healing and cancer.
