= Mir-326 microRNA precursor family =

mir-326

Identifiers
- Symbol: mir-326
- Rfam: RF00719
- miRBase family: MIPF0000143

Other data
- RNA type: microRNA
- Domain: Eukaryota;
- PDB structures: PDBe

In molecular biology mir-326 microRNA is a short RNA molecule. MicroRNAs function to regulate the expression levels of other genes by several mechanisms.

== See also ==
- MicroRNA
