= Mir-449 microRNA precursor family =

miR-449

Identifiers
- Symbol: miR-449
- Rfam: RF00711
- miRBase family: MIPF0000133

Other data
- RNA type: microRNA
- Domain: Eukaryota;
- PDB structures: PDBe

In molecular biology, microRNAs function to regulate the expression levels of other genes by several mechanisms. The miR-449 microRNA family encompasses three homologous small RNA molecules (miR-449a/b/c). This miR-449 cluster is located in the second intron of the CDC20B gene which both are co-transcribed. This miR-449 family belongs to the miR-34/miR-449 superfamily of microRNAs that is composed of six homologous miRNAs, named miR-34a/b/c and miR-449a/b/c. They are grouped together in the same superfamily, as their seed region and their adjacent nucleotide sequences are largely conserved. The miR-449 miRNAs control the differentiation of multiciliated cells in vertebrates.

== See also ==
- MicroRNA
