= Mir-92 microRNA precursor family =

Family of short non-coding RNA fragments

mir-92 microRNA precursor family
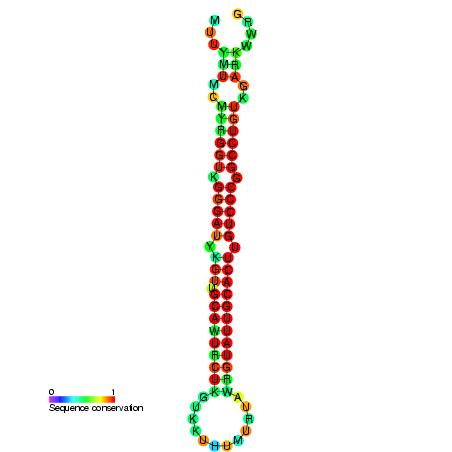
- Predicted secondary structure and sequence conservation of mir-92

Identifiers
- Symbol: mir-92
- Rfam: RF00464
- miRBase: MI0000093
- miRBase family: MIPF0000013

Other data
- RNA type: Gene; miRNA
- Domain: Eukaryota
- GO: GO:0035195 GO:0035068
- SO: SO:0001244
- PDB structures: PDBe

The miR-92 microRNAs are short single stranded non-protein coding RNA fragments initially discovered incorporated into an RNP complex with a proposed role of processing RNA molecules and further RNP assembly. Mir-92 has been mapped to the human genome as part of a larger cluster at chromosome 13q31.3, where it is 22 nucleotides in length but exists in the genome as part of a longer precursor sequence. There is an exact replica of the mir-92 precursor on the X chromosome. MicroRNAs are endogenous triggers of the RNAi pathway which involves several ribonucleic proteins (RNPs) dedicated to repressing mRNA molecules via translation inhibition and/or induction of mRNA cleavage. miRNAs are themselves matured from their long RNA precursors by ribonucleic proteins as part of a 2 step biogenesis mechanism involving RNA polymerase 2.

Most miRNAs are grouped into clusters in the human genome or within families that share functions, expression profiles, promoters, or are incorporated into the same ribonucleic protein. The purpose of having a variety of miRNAs in a single piece of RNA processing machinery is to act as complementary strands to the recognition elements of a variety of target RNA molecules.

The recognition elements of target mRNAs are typically within the 3' untranslated regions and with 678 human miRNAs and 472 mouse miRNAs confidently identified so far (miRBASE) there are extensive efforts taking place using bioinformatics tools to scan genomes for potential recognition elements for families of miRNAs in order to identify potential target genes.

Mir-92 is no exception and currently identified gene targets have been among those involved in cell cycle regulation and cell signalling, and thus necessary during all stages of mammalian development and essential for the proliferation of cells. miRNAs can be oncogenes or tumor suppressor genes depending on their targets while mir-92 has been implicated as the former in leukaemia forms AML and ALL, Hepatocellular carcinoma (HCC) and several other cancers.

The search for noninvasive tools for diagnosis and management of cancer is extremely important for reducing the worldwide health burden of cancer. miRNAs show potential as biomarkers and can even be found circulating in the serum. Some circulating miRNAs are specific to tumour patients, while miR-92 on the other-hand is present in healthy individuals in the serum, but levels are variable and appear to change in response to the onset of some cancers.

== Family ==
miR-92 is part of a large precursor sequence that forms a stem loop once transcribed into RNA. This long precursor sequence is a component of the mir-17-92 cluster which contains 5 additional mir precursor sequences: mir-17, mir-18a, mir-19a, mir-20a and mir19b-1. The components have related functions and also exist in their mature form as part of RNP complexes. The cluster is called Oncomir-1 because all members have been connected with inducing enhanced cell proliferation and suppression of apoptosis. Oncomir-1 has 2 paralogs, miR-106a-363 and mir-106b-25. These are located on different chromosomes and contain individual miRNAs that are highly similar to those encoded by the mir-17-92 cluster. Mir-92-1 for example, appears on the mir-17-92 cluster and mir-92-2 appears on the mir-106a-363 cluster. Because they have identical sequences in their mature form it is not always possible to establish which is prominent in a sample simply by sequencing the small RNA content. The miRNAs of oncomir-1 and its paralogs are likely contribute to tumorigenesis by dysregulating critical target genes such as ones involved in apoptosis, proliferation and blocking differentiation or cell cycle exit.

The miR-17-92 Cluster has been implicated in Medulloblastoma (MB) which is the most common paediatric malignant brain tumour. It arises when cerebellar granule neurone progenitor (GNP) cells fail to properly migrate and differentiate. MB can be induced by 2 inherited cancer syndromes, one of which is called the Gorlin syndrome and is caused by a mutated PATCHED(PTCH) gene. PTCH is the receptor for Sonic hedgehog (SHH). This SHH signalling pathway is crucial during early development and SSH is the major mitogen for GNP proliferation. Turcots's syndrome can give rise to MB as well, resulting from a mutated adenomatous polyposis coli (APC) gene (a member of the wingless (WNT signalling pathway). But only Gorlin syndrome and the SHH pathway is thought to incorporate the mode of action of the miR-17-92 cluster.

== Expression patterns ==
Expression patterns of many miRNAs are timing and organ specific, especially those involved in the regulation of development. miRNA libraries constructed from cloning and sequencing short RNAs derived from cultures of mouse embryonic stem cells have shown miR-92 to be expressed. These totipotent cells represent the earliest stages of mammalian development (they are derived from the inner cells of the blastocyst ). However, mir-92 was also present in libraries constructed from four-day-old fully differentiated cells, as well as libraries constructed from adult tissues. An miRNA that remains constant in its expression through these stages is proposed to have a role in regulating general aspects of cell physiology. Thus it was becoming evident in 2003 shortly after its discovery, that the mir-92 miRNA and associated family members are providing functional roles to the cell cycle and to cell signalling, and to general cell physiology.

As there is a relatively small number of miRNAs encoded in the human genome compared with the number of protein coding genes, miRNAs are becoming the biomarkers of choice to characterise the state of a tissue or cell sample. Also there are no mRNA markers that show consistent differential expression between tumours and normal tissues but profiling all of the miRNAs has proved much more informative with respect to cancer diagnosis and its developmental origins. The extent of differential expression of miRNAs is even high enough that hierarchical clustering has enabled petitioning of samples within a single developmental lineage reflecting mechanisms of transformation and providing miRNA finger prints that encode the development of typical human cancers. As mir-92 is expressed in the majority of cells at all times, its expression profiles will form a reliable part of diagnosis and detection of disease. miR-92a is also present in the blood plasma of humans along with 91 other miRNAs.

The level of miR-92a in the circulation has been shown to reflect the onset of certain types of leukaemia (see experimental evidence section).

== Gene targets ==
As miR recognition elements are typically found in the 3' UTR of the target gene mRNA, bioinformatics alone can identify putative miR-92 targets using resources such as miRGen database. In one report, miRanda software found 300 different genes that have putative miR-92a binding sites conserved among Homo sapiens, Mus musculus, and Rattus norvegicus at the 3' UTR regions of their transcripts. Two genes brought into the limelight by such means were ERβ and MUC16. Down regulation of oestrogen receptors β1 and α have been associated with various forms of breast cancer. While the mode of action of ERα is not well established there is strong evidence supporting a role for miR-92 within the regulatory pathway of ERβ1. Profiling different breast cancer cell lines against non cancerous control cell lines demonstrated a significant inverse relationship between expression of ERβ1 and miR-92. Specifically, MCF-7 breast cancer cell lines transfected with anti-miR-92 showed an increase in ERβ1 whereas transfection with pre-miR-92 resulted in down regulation of ERβ1. Similarly, and as a side experiment, the knock down of miR-92 had equivalent action of restoring MUC16 expression in the same cell type. Further evidence came when transfecting MCF-7 cells with a GFP reporter cloned to contain the ERβ1 3' UTR region. Flow cytometry revealed significant increase in green fluorescence upon transfection with anti-miR-92. This evidence suggests that miR-92 targets both ERβ1 and MUC16 mRNA and in doing so suppresses their expression.

== Experimental evidence ==
=== First clues for the function of mir-17-92 ===
miR-92 miRNA was first isolated from Hela cell lysate from a ~15S sediment particle. It was one member of a group of 40 other miRNAs and two key proteins that make up a ribonucleic protein analogous to the SMN protein complex. SWN has a role in assembly and processing of further RNPs. Deletions and loss of function to the SMN complex has been correlated with the neurodegenerative disease spinal muscular atrophy. Also present in the same cosediment peak was the eIF2C2 protein belonging to the family Argonaute. The Argonautes are involved in regulating gene expression via RNA interference.

=== miR-92 as a biomarker for Leukaemia ===
As discussed, there is evidence supporting plasma miR-92 as a biomarker for leukaemia detection. This was concluded after microarray screening of blood plasma from leukaemia patients against healthy samples. Although the over-all expression profiles were not significantly different the rank order of intensity of a few key small RNAs changed drastically enough to encourage attention and specific analysis. MiR-92 was one of these. RT-PCR confirmed a down regulation of miR-92a in patients of acute myeloid leukaemia and acute lymphoblastic leukaemia. MiR-92a is strongly expressed in the leukaemia cells themselves with no expression detected in normal blasts (in situ hybridisation). This appears counter-intuitive firstly because there is no obvious source for miRNA production or maintenance in blood plasma, and secondly because there seems to be an inverse relationship between leukaemia cell miR-92 levels and blood plasma miR-92 levels in patients with the disease. 91 miRNAs are present in human plasma and it has been proposed that miR-92a along with other serum-typical miRs such as miR-638, are packaged inside exosomes that are secreted from cells. For miRNAs to exist in plasma they need to be in a form that is resistant to RNase activity and this could be achieved from within exosomes. Since we have established that miR-92 is such a prominent feature in many cancers it is tempting to conclude that cancer cells may take in the exosomes to supplement the amount of locally expressed miR-92a. The result of this action would be a corresponding decrease of miR-92a in blood plasma.

=== Role of miR-92 in Hepatocellular Cancer ===
Evidence supporting a role for miR-92 in hepatocellular cancer (HCC) was derived from in situ hybridisation experiments of tumours. Over expression of miR-92 was well pronounced across sex, age, virus type, clinical stage, and tumour differentiation stage, making miR-92 a potential robust biomarker for HCC. Transfection of human HCC cell lines with anti-miR-92a antagomir (complementary RNA strand that triggers depletion of target miRNA) reduced the proliferation rate of the cell line versus transfection with a control oligonucleotide. Following a similar principle to the proposed miR-92 uptake by leukaemia cells (see above), transfection with additional miR-92a increased the proliferation rate of 2 out of 3 of the already-proliferating cancerous cell lines.

=== miR-92 acts through the Sonic Hedgehog Pathway to Induce Tumorigenesis and MB ===
As discussed, the mir-17-92 cluster has been proposed to have a functional relationship with Patched signalling. An abnormal functioning of which can induce the GNP tumours typical of Medulloblastoma. This hypothesis was arrived at by taking miRNA expression profiles of GNP-like tumour cells from mouse mutants. There are various mouse knock out mutants that show a spontaneous development of MB within 5 months of life. They form a classic group for the study of medulloblastoma and other cancers and include mice lines that are KO for p53, Ptch1, and Ink4c. Of the 26 miRNAs showing higher expression levels (in one of the mutant groups) against wild type mice, 9 of them were from the mir-17-92 cluster and its 2 paralogs. Overall signature changes across mutant groups and control groups were largely insignificant and the mir-17-92 cluster was only implicated in mutant mice that had an active SHH pathway. These observations merited further focus on the cluster and QRT-PCR was used to measure the expression of the oncogenic cluster in samples of MB tumours more accurately. Over expression was particularly pronounced for miR-92 and miR20a. Similarly, these trends were only present in tumours whose expression profiles revealed an activated SHH pathway.

The implication is that miR-92 and other miRNAs from mir-17-92 drive the formation of human MB by acting upon the SHH/PTCH pathway. In further studies with mice, an inhibitor of the SHH pathway (cyclopamine drug) was sufficient to reduce proliferation of tumour cells that had been infected with a retro virus encoding mir-17-92 (plus a GFP reporter). The level of reduction in proliferation was towards background levels of normal MB tumours: as in those uninfected with the retro virus. Once again, an aberrant SHH/PTCH pathway was necessary for these observations.

=== Role of miR-92 ortholog in Caenorhabditis elegans ===
The miR-92 family is evolutionally conserved microRNAs, and has an ortholog in Caenorhabditis elegans, which has been extensively used as a model organism in the area of developmental biology. mir-235, the miR-92 ortholog in C. elegans, acts in the hypodermis and glial cells to maintain the quiescent state in both neuroblasts and mesoblasts until nutritional state becomes favorable, meaning that mir-235 couples stem cell behaviors to nutritional condition. Furthermore, mir-235 directly represses the expression of nhr-91, which is an ortholog of mammalian germ cell nuclear factor (GCNF), to keep stem cell quiescent. The expression of mir-235 is regulated by the insulin/insulin-like growth factor (IGF) signalling (IIS) pathway in respond to nutritional state. Once nutritional conditions becomes favorable, the expression of mir-235 is downregulated by IIS pathway, and stem cells leave from quiescent state and resume the developmental program, such as self-renewal, migration and differentiation.

In C. elegans, mir-235 is a sole ortholog of miR-92 family. However, mir-235 does not form the cluster structure and is not clear whether the biological functions have been conserved between human and C. elegans.

== Clinical implications ==
From the investigations that have been reviewed in this article we can draw some direction as to how miR-92 could have important clinical implications. Thanks to the level of diversity in miRNA expression across cancers, using them as a diagnosis and classification tool has serious potential. The modest number of miRNAs present in the genome and in specific profiling experiments allow for highly resolved patterns without overly complex data sets. As an example, a set of miRNA profiles of well differentiated cancers was used to train a decision algorithm for application on another set of poorly differentiated tumours (for which clinical diagnosis is normally established by anatomical means). Successful diagnosis of the test set was significantly increased.

Apart from diagnosis and characterisation of cancers, there is also therapeutic value to the discovery of miR-92s involvement in essential cell physiology and in promoting cancer. Returning to our review of breast cancer, the isoform ERβ1 is well studied as having anti-proliferative effects and pro-apoptotic effects. We discussed that miR-92 targets and down regulates ERβ1, and evidence suggests that miR-92 is regulated by oestrogen which is upstream of the ERβ1. Evidence for this was demonstrated by growing MCF-7 cells in oestrogen depleted conditions and adding antagonists to the oestrogen receptors: Tamoxifen and E2. miR-92 was upregulated in response, suggesting that the likely oncogenic role for miR-92 in this context is inhibition of ERβ1 expression in the presence of oestrogen. Thus, a therapeutic strategy against breast cancer could be aimed at re-activating expression of ERβ1 through manipulation of miR-92 expression.

For HCC patients (discussed in the previous section), quantitative real time PCR (qRT-PCR) demonstrated a reduction of miR-92a in the plasma against healthy blood samples. Similarly, the over-expression of miR-92a can also be detected in human faeces in colorectal cancer patients. This bears similarities to the discoveries made by profiling leukaemia patients (also discussed in the previous section). The expression differences in both cases was relative to miR-638 levels. miR-638 is an miRNA that seems to have a consistent presence in human blood plasma and may be physiologically necessary. This demonstrates that a decrease in the miR-92a:miR-638 ratio in human plasma may serve as a valuable diagnostic marker not only for leukaemia but also for solid tumours such as HCC.

In respect to the Medullablastoma studies, therapeutic strategy could include using antigomirs against the oncomir-1 cluster in patients harbouring an aberrant SHH/PATCHED pathway.
