= Mir-633 microRNA precursor family =

mir-633

Identifiers
- Symbol: mir-633
- Rfam: RF01028
- miRBase family: MIPF0000546

Other data
- RNA type: microRNA
- Domain(s): Eukaryota;
- PDB structures: PDBe

In molecular biology mir-633 microRNA is a short RNA molecule. MicroRNAs function to regulate the expression levels of other genes by several mechanisms.

== miR-633 in Leukaemia ==
miR-633 has been linked to acute lymphoblastic leukaemia (ALL) and as having a potential role in the development of leukaemia, due to abnormal expression in ALL subjects. It may be of use for prediction of relapse potential and in development of personalised leukaemia treatments.

== Progesterone regulation ==
miR-633 expression in endometrial carcinoma cells upon treatment with progesterone saw a 50% decrease in expression levels. These point towards a possible critical role of miR-633, alongside other miRNAs, in the regulation of posttranscriptional gene expression on progesterone treatment.

== See also ==
- MicroRNA
