= Mir-58 microRNA precursor family =

Micro RNA precuror family

mir-58

Identifiers
- Symbol: mir-58
- Rfam: RF00835
- miRBase family: 4

Other data
- RNA type: microRNA
- Domain: Eukaryota;
- PDB structures: PDBe

In molecular biology mir-58 microRNA is a short RNA molecule. MicroRNAs function to regulate the expression levels of other genes by several mechanisms.

== See also ==
- MicroRNA
