= Mir-346 microRNA precursor family =

mir-346

Identifiers
- Symbol: mir-346
- Rfam: RF00758
- miRBase family: MIPF0000188

Other data
- RNA type: microRNA
- Domain: Eukaryota;
- PDB structures: PDBe

In molecular biology mir-346 microRNA is a short RNA molecule. MicroRNAs function to regulate the expression levels of other genes by several mechanisms.

== See also ==
- MicroRNA
