= MiR-224 =

Family of microRNA precursors found in mammals, including humans

miR-224
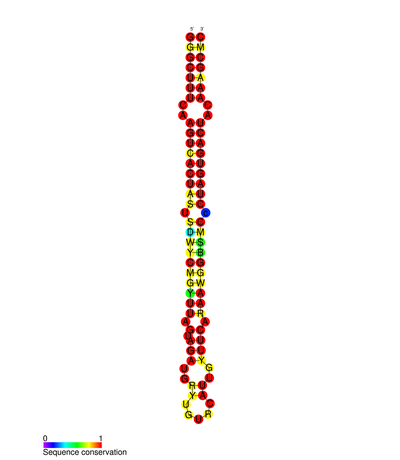
- Conserved secondary structure of miR-224 microRNA precursor

Identifiers
- Symbol: miR-224
- Alt. Symbols: MIR224
- Rfam: RF00680
- miRBase: MI0000301
- miRBase family: MIPF0000088
- NCBI Gene: 407009
- HGNC: 31604
- OMIM: 300769
- RefSeq: NR_029638

Other data
- RNA type: miRNA
- Domain(s): Mammalia
- GO: 0035195
- SO: 0001244
- Locus: Chr. X q28
- PDB structures: PDBe

miR-224 is a family of microRNA precursors found in mammals, including humans. The ~22 nucleotide mature miRNA sequence is excised from the precursor hairpin by the enzyme Dicer.

== Function ==
miR-224, being located on the X-chromosome, is thought to be active in mammalian ovaries, and possibly responds to TGF beta 1. A target of miR-224 has been predicted to be SMAD4. Experimental evidence has shown that while the SMAD4 mRNA level is unchanged, increased miR-224 expression decreases concentration of SMDA4 protein in murine granulosa cells. This is consistent with post-transcriptional miRNA regulation.

== Role in cancer ==
miR-224 has been noted as the most upregulated microRNA in hepatocellular carcinoma. The same study identified a target of mir-224 as apoptosis-inhibitor 5 (API-5).

miR-224 has also been linked with pancreatic ductal carcinoma, where it is thought to repress CD40 expression in cancer cells.
