= MiR396 microRNA precursor family =

Short, regulatory miRNA molecule

miR396

Identifiers
- Symbol: miR396
- Rfam: RF00648
- miRBase family: MIPF0000047

Other data
- RNA type: microRNA
- Domain: Viridiplantae
- PDB structures: PDBe

In molecular biology, miR396 is a conserved plant microRNA that regulates gene expression by targeting transcripts encoding Growth-regulating factor (GRF) transcription factors. The miR396–GRF regulatory module is widely conserved among flowering plants and plays important roles in organ growth, developmental patterning, and responses to environmental cues.

== Function ==
miR396 regulates plant development primarily by repressing members of the GRF transcription factor family. In Arabidopsis thaliana, miR396 targets multiple GRF genes whose products promote cell proliferation in developing organs. Increasing miR396 levels reduces GRF expression and limits cell division during organ development.

miR396 accumulates progressively during leaf development and restricts GRF expression to specific regions of the organ. This spatial regulation helps determine the number of dividing cells and therefore contributes to the control of final leaf size and morphology.

== Roles in development ==
The miR396–GRF regulatory module controls multiple developmental processes in plants. Overexpression of miR396 in Arabidopsis results in narrow leaves with reduced cell numbers, demonstrating its role in limiting cell proliferation during organ growth.

miR396 also regulates reproductive development. In flowers, repression of GRF genes by miR396 influences pistil development and carpel formation through modulation of the GRF/GIF transcriptional complex.

In roots, miR396 contributes to the regulation of stem cell activity and the transition between stem cells and rapidly dividing transit-amplifying cells. This regulation involves interactions between GRF transcription factors and other developmental regulators such as PLETHORA proteins.

== Roles in regeneration ==
The miR396–GRF regulatory pathway also contributes to regeneration processes in plants. During root tip regeneration, miR396 promotes stem cell competence by restricting GRF expression in the stem cell region, while GRF proteins promote cell proliferation in surrounding tissues. This balance between miR396 and GRF activity influences both regeneration speed and the re-establishment of the stem cell niche.

== Evolution and conservation ==
Members of the miR396 family are conserved across many plant species and regulate GRF transcription factors through complementary target sites in GRF transcripts. This conserved interaction forms an important developmental module controlling organ growth and tissue patterning in plants.

== See also ==
- MicroRNA
