= Mir-497 microRNA precursor family =

mir-497

Identifiers
- Symbol: mir-497
- Rfam: RF00793
- miRBase family: MIPF0000231

Other data
- RNA type: microRNA
- Domain: Eukaryota;
- PDB structures: PDBe

In molecular biology mir-497 microRNA is a short RNA molecule. MicroRNAs function to regulate the expression levels of other genes by several mechanisms.

== See also ==
- MicroRNA
