= Mir-370 microRNA precursor family =

mir-370

Identifiers
- Symbol: mir-370
- Rfam: RF00740
- miRBase family: MIPF0000167

Other data
- RNA type: microRNA
- Domain: Eukaryota;
- PDB structures: PDBe

In molecular biology mir-370 microRNA is a short RNA molecule. MicroRNAs function to regulate the expression levels of other genes by several mechanisms. This microRNA, mir-370-3p, has been shown to play a role in heart failure. The upregulation of mir-370-3p in the sinus node leads to downregulation of the pacemaker ion channel, HCN4, and thus downregulation of the corresponding ionic current, which causes sinus bradycardia.

== See also ==
- MicroRNA
