= Mir-344 microRNA precursor family =

mir-344

Identifiers
- Symbol: mir-344
- Rfam: RF00825
- miRBase family: MIPF0000267

Other data
- RNA type: microRNA
- Domain(s): Eukaryota;
- PDB structures: PDBe

In molecular biology, mir-344 microRNA is a short RNA molecule. MicroRNAs function to regulate the expression levels of other genes by several mechanisms. The pre-miR-344 is transcribed directly as a precursor microRNA hairpin and thus contains a 5' m7G-cap.

== See also ==
- MicroRNA
