= Mir-25 microRNA precursor family =

Precursor microRNA family

mir-25

Identifiers
- Symbol: mir-25
- Rfam: RF02020
- miRBase family: 25

Other data
- RNA type: microRNA
- Domain: Eukaryota;
- PDB structures: PDBe

In molecular biology mir-25 microRNA is a short RNA molecule. MicroRNAs function to regulate the expression levels of other genes by several mechanisms. mir-25 levels increase in human heart failure, and treatment with an anti-sense RNA molecule (antagomiR) was recently reported to halt disease progression and improves cardiac function in a mouse heart failure model.

== See also ==
- MicroRNA
