= Mir-636 microRNA precursor family =

mir-636

Identifiers
- Symbol: mir-636
- Rfam: RF01008
- miRBase family: MIPF0000524

Other data
- RNA type: microRNA
- Domain(s): Eukaryota;
- PDB structures: PDBe

In molecular biology mir-636 microRNA is a short RNA molecule. MicroRNAs function to regulate the expression levels of other genes by several mechanisms.

== miR-636 and MDS ==
miR-636 has been identified as one of three key miRNAs associated with the anti-ageing myelodysplastic syndromes (MDS). Its levels correspond to high discrimination between MDS and normal controls, and expression is decreased in MDS. In this way it can be used as a potential diagnostic marker for MDS.

== Glucocorticoid resistance ==
Resistance to glucocorticoids (GC) used in the treatment of blood-related malignancies greatly impairs their clinical utility. The active glucocorticoid receptor GR-α is required for an effective response to GCs, but this is significantly downregulated in GC-resistant cell lines MM.1Re and MM.1RL. miR-636 has been found to be differentially expressed between GC-sensitive and GC-resistant MM.1 cell lines. It has therefore been identified as a possible candidate responsible for postranscriptional silencing of GR-α in GC-resistant cells.

== See also ==
- MicroRNA
