= Mir-384 microRNA precursor family =

mir-384

Identifiers
- Symbol: mir-384
- Rfam: RF00841
- miRBase family: MIPF0000289

Other data
- RNA type: microRNA
- Domain(s): Eukaryota;
- PDB structures: PDBe

In molecular biology mir-384 microRNA is a short RNA molecule. MicroRNAs function to regulate the expression levels of other genes by several mechanisms.

== See also ==
- MicroRNA
