= Mir-580 microRNA precursor family =

Short RNA molecule

mir-580

Identifiers
- Symbol: mir-580
- Rfam: RF01000
- miRBase family: MIPF0000515

Other data
- RNA type: microRNA
- Domain(s): Eukaryota;
- PDB structures: PDBe

In molecular biology mir-580 microRNA is a short RNA molecule. MicroRNAs function to regulate the expression levels of other genes by several mechanisms.

== See also ==
- MicroRNA
