= Mir-277 microRNA precursor family =

mir-277

Identifiers
- Symbol: mir-277
- Rfam: RF00730
- miRBase family: 5

Other data
- RNA type: microRNA
- Domain: Eukaryota;
- PDB structures: PDBe

In molecular biology mir-277 microRNA is a short RNA molecule. MicroRNAs function to regulate the expression levels of other genes by several mechanisms.

== See also ==
- MicroRNA
