= Mir-541 microRNA precursor family =

Short RNA molecule

mir-541

Identifiers
- Symbol: mir-541
- Rfam: RF00777
- miRBase family: MIPF0000213

Other data
- RNA type: microRNA
- Domain(s): Eukaryota;
- PDB structures: PDBe

In molecular biology mir-541 microRNA is a short RNA molecule. MicroRNAs function to regulate the expression levels of other genes by several mechanisms.

== See also ==
- MicroRNA
