= Mir-202 microRNA precursor family =

mir-202

Identifiers
- Symbol: mir-202
- Rfam: RF00705
- miRBase family: 6

Other data
- RNA type: microRNA
- Domain: Eukaryota;
- PDB structures: PDBe

In molecular biology mir-202 microRNA is a short RNA molecule. MicroRNAs function to regulate the expression levels of other genes by several mechanisms. The pre-miR-202 in the mouse genome is located fully within an exon, whereas in human it lies across a splice junction. This implies that human miR-202 is exposed to a negative regulation by splicing, whereas murine miR-202 is not.

== See also ==
- MicroRNA
