= Mir-592 microRNA precursor family =

mir-592

Identifiers
- Symbol: mir-592
- Rfam: RF00877
- miRBase family: MIPF0000340

Other data
- RNA type: microRNA
- Domain: Eukaryota;
- PDB structures: PDBe

In molecular biology mir-592 microRNA is a short RNA molecule. MicroRNAs function to regulate the expression levels of other genes by several mechanisms.

== Expression in cancers ==
Significantly altered expression of miR-592 has been observed between tumours deficient and proficient for mismatch repair in colon cancer. Expression levels are lower in the proficient form compared to the deficient, with a more than two-fold change. This altered expression has been proposed to reflect a reversion to regulatory programs seen in earlier undifferentiated and proliferative developmental states.

miR-592 expression is also altered in hepatocellular carcinoma; it has been shown to be downregulated along with nine other microRNAs.

== See also ==
- MicroRNA
