= Mir-322 microRNA precursor family =

DNA-like molecule in the human body

mir-322

Identifiers
- Symbol: mir-322
- Rfam: RF00737
- miRBase family: MIPF0000164

Other data
- RNA type: microRNA
- Domain: Eukaryota;
- PDB structures: PDBe

In molecular biology mir-322 microRNA is a short RNA molecule. MicroRNAs function to regulate the expression levels of other genes by several mechanisms.
