= Mir-62 microRNA precursor family =

mir-62

Identifiers
- Symbol: mir-62
- Rfam: RF00847
- miRBase family: MIPF0000296

Other data
- RNA type: microRNA
- Domain: Eukaryota;
- PDB structures: PDBe

In molecular biology mir-62 microRNA is a short RNA molecule. MicroRNAs function to regulate the expression levels of other genes by several mechanisms.

== See also ==
- MicroRNA
