= MiR-218 microRNA precursor family =

Non-coding RNA

mir-218 microRNA precursor family
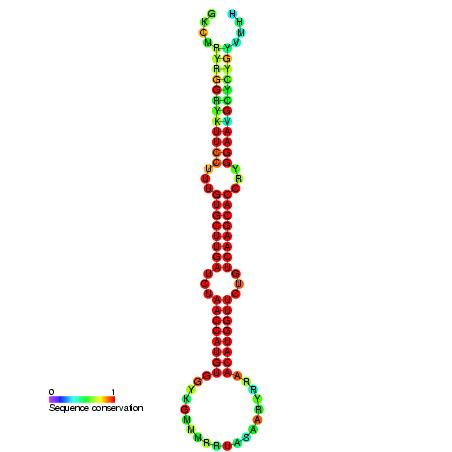
- Predicted secondary structure and sequence conservation of mir-218

Identifiers
- Symbol: mir-218
- Rfam: RF00255
- miRBase: MI0000294
- miRBase family: MIPF0000026

Other data
- RNA type: Gene; miRNA
- Domain: Eukaryota
- GO: GO:0035195 GO:0035068
- SO: SO:0001244
- PDB structures: PDBe

miR-218 microRNA precursor is a small non-coding RNA that regulates gene expression by antisense binding.

miR-218 appears to be a vertebrate specific microRNA and has now been predicted and experimentally confirmed in a wide range of vertebrate species. The extents of the hairpin precursors are not known. In this case the mature sequence in excised from the 5'arm of the hairpin.

miR-218 is specifically expressed by mammalian motor neurons during embryonic development into adulthood, and motor neurons lacking expression of miR-218 exhibit hyperexcitability, neuromuscular junction failure, and neurodegeneration, as demonstrated by knockout mouse models.

The involvement of miR-218 in cancer has also been investigated. miR-218, along with miR-585, has been found to be silenced by DNA methylation in oral squamous cell carcinoma. It is also downregulated in Nasopharyngeal carcinoma, with artificially-induced expression serving to slow tumour growth. miR-218 has also been found to have tumour suppressing qualities in bladder cancer cells. miR-218 expression was associated with overall survival in breast cancer datasets.
