= Mir-572 microRNA precursor family =

Short RNA molecule

mir-572

Identifiers
- Symbol: mir-572
- Rfam: RF01020
- miRBase family: MIPF0000537

Other data
- RNA type: microRNA
- Domain: Eukaryota;
- PDB structures: PDBe

In molecular biology mir-572 microRNA is a short RNA molecule. MicroRNAs function to regulate the expression levels of other genes by several mechanisms.

== See also ==
- MicroRNA
