= Mir-552 microRNA precursor family =

mir-552

Identifiers
- Symbol: mir-552
- Rfam: RF00990
- miRBase family: MIPF0000501

Other data
- RNA type: microRNA
- Domain: Eukaryota;
- PDB structures: PDBe

In molecular biology mir-552 microRNA is a short RNA molecule. MicroRNAs function to regulate the expression levels of other genes by several mechanisms. Researchers have detected elevated levels of mir-522 expression in colorectal cancer metastases.

== See also ==
- MicroRNA
