= Mir-431 microRNA precursor family =

mir-431

Identifiers
- Symbol: mir-431
- Rfam: RF00718
- miRBase family: MIPF0000142

Other data
- RNA type: microRNA
- Domain(s): Eukaryota;
- PDB structures: PDBe

In molecular biology mir-431 microRNA is a short RNA molecule. MicroRNAs function to regulate the expression levels of other genes by several mechanisms.
