= MiR398 microRNA precursor family =

miR398

Identifiers
- Symbol: miR398
- Rfam: RF00695
- miRBase family: MIPF0000107

Other data
- RNA type: microRNA
- Domain: Viridiplantae
- PDB structures: PDBe

In molecular biology, miR398 is a conserved microRNA found in plants that regulates genes involved in copper homeostasis and oxidative stress responses. Like other plant microRNAs, miR398 regulates gene expression primarily through sequence-directed cleavage of target mRNAs.

In Arabidopsis thaliana, miR398 targets transcripts encoding the copper/zinc superoxide dismutases CSD1 and CSD2, as well as the copper chaperone for superoxide dismutase (CCS). Expression of miR398 is dynamically regulated by environmental conditions, including oxidative stress, sucrose signaling, and copper availability.

Under copper deficiency, transcription factors such as SPL7 coordinate the induction of miR398 and related regulatory pathways to prioritize copper allocation to essential proteins. Through this regulatory network, miR398 contributes to plant adaptation to oxidative and nutrient stress conditions.

== See also ==
- MicroRNA
