= Mir-42 microRNA precursor family =

MicroRNA precuror family

mir-42

Identifiers
- Symbol: mir-42
- Rfam: RF00794
- miRBase family: 321

Other data
- RNA type: microRNA
- Domain(s): Eukaryota;
- PDB structures: PDBe

In molecular biology, mir-42 microRNA is a short RNA molecule. MicroRNAs function to regulate the expression levels of other genes by several mechanisms.

== See also ==
- MicroRNA
