= Mir-130 microRNA precursor family =

mir-130 microRNA precursor family
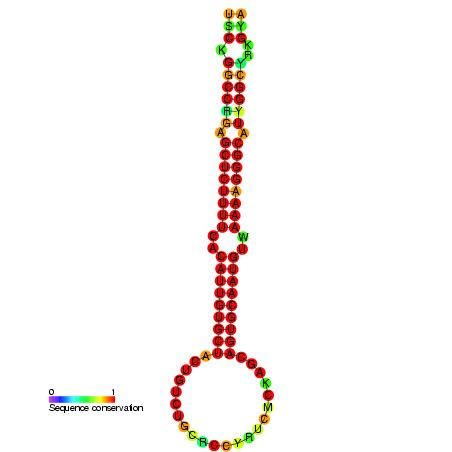
- Predicted secondary structure and sequence conservation of mir-130

Identifiers
- Symbol: mir-130
- Rfam: RF00258
- miRBase: MI0000448
- miRBase family: MIPF0000034

Other data
- RNA type: Gene; miRNA
- Domain: Eukaryota
- GO: GO:0035195 GO:0035068
- SO: SO:0001244
- PDB structures: PDBe

In molecular biology, miR-130 microRNA precursor is a small non-coding RNA that regulates gene expression. This microRNA has been identified in mouse (MI0000156, MI0000408), and in human (MI0000448, MI0000748). miR-130 appears to be vertebrate-specific miRNA and has now been predicted or experimentally confirmed in a range of vertebrate species (MIPF0000034). Mature microRNAs are processed from the precursor stem-loop by the Dicer enzyme. In this case, the mature sequence is excised from the 3' arm of the hairpin. It has been found that miR-130 is upregulated in a type of cancer called hepatocellular carcinoma. It has been shown that miR-130a is expressed in the hematopoietic stem/progenitor cell compartment but not in mature blood cells.
