= MAGI3 =

Protein-coding gene in humans

Identifiers
- Aliases: MAGI3, MAGI-3, dJ730K3.2, membrane associated guanylate kinase, WW and PDZ domain containing 3
- External IDs: OMIM: 615943; MGI: 1923484; GeneCards: MAGI3
Available structures
PDB	Ortholog search: PDBe RCSB
PDB	List of PDB id codes 3SOE

Gene location (Human)
Chr.	Chromosome 1 (human)
Band	1p13.2	Start	113,390,515 bp
Band	1p13.2	End	113,685,923 bp

Gene location (Mouse)
Chr.	Chromosome 3 (mouse)
Band	3 F2.2|3 45.52 cM	Start	103,920,575 bp
Band	3 F2.2|3 45.52 cM	End	104,127,690 bp
RNA expression pattern
Bgee	Human / Mouse (ortholog); Top expressed in: lower lobe of lung; nasal epithelium; mucosa of ileum; jejunal mucosa; mucosa of colon; palpebral conjunctiva; mucosa of sigmoid colon; corpus epididymis; pars compacta; mucosa of pharynx / Top expressed in: atrioventricular valve; globus pallidus; habenula; superior colliculus; dorsal tegmental nucleus; left lung lobe; medial vestibular nucleus; ventral tegmental area; ciliary body; piriform cortex; More reference expression data
BioGPS	n/a
Gene ontology
Molecular function	molecular adaptor activity; nucleotide binding; guanylate kinase activity; protein binding; ATP binding
Cellular component	plasma membrane; membrane; nucleus; cell-cell junction; bicellular tight junction; cell junction; cytoplasm
Biological process	regulation of JNK cascade; intracellular signal transduction; viral process; signal transduction; apoptotic process; GDP metabolic process; GMP metabolic process
Sources:Amigo / QuickGO
Orthologs
Databases	NCBI: entry; OMA: entry
Species	Human	Mouse
Entrez	260425	99470
Ensembl	ENSG00000081026	ENSMUSG00000052539
UniProt	Q5TCQ9	Q9EQJ9
RefSeq (mRNA)	NM_001142782; NM_020965; NM_152900	NM_001159354; NM_133853
RefSeq (protein)	NP_001136254; NP_690864; NP_690864.2	NP_001152826; NP_598614
Location (UCSC)	Chr 1: 113.39 – 113.69 Mb	Chr 3: 103.92 – 104.13 Mb
PubMed search
- Wikidata
View/Edit Human	View/Edit Mouse

Membrane-associated guanylate kinase, WW and PDZ domain-containing protein 3 is an enzyme that in humans is encoded by the MAGI3 gene.

== Interactions ==
MAGI3 has been shown to interact with PTPRB and PTEN.
