= Mir-569 microRNA precursor family =

mir-569

Identifiers
- Symbol: mir-569
- Rfam: RF01018
- miRBase family: MIPF0000535

Other data
- RNA type: microRNA
- Domain(s): Eukaryota;
- PDB structures: PDBe

In molecular biology mir-569 microRNA is a short RNA molecule. MicroRNAs function to regulate the expression levels of other genes by several mechanisms.

== See also ==
- MicroRNA
