= MIRN21 =

Non-coding RNA in the species Homo sapiens

MIR21

Identifiers
- Aliases: MIR21, MIRN21, hsa-mir-21, miR-21, miRNA21, microRNA 21, MIRN21 microRNA, human
- External IDs: OMIM: 611020; GeneCards: MIR21

Gene location (Human)
Chr.	Chromosome 17 (human)
Band	17q23.1	Start	59,841,266 bp
Band	17q23.1	End	59,841,337 bp
RNA expression pattern
Bgee	Human / Mouse (ortholog); Top expressed in: kidney; epithelium; glomerulus; prostate; spleen; reproductive organ; pituitary gland; uterus; epididymis; islet of Langerhans / n/a; More reference expression data
BioGPS	n/a
Orthologs
Databases	NCBI: entry; OMA: entry
Species	Human	Mouse
Entrez	406991	n/a
Ensembl	ENSG00000284190	n/a
UniProt	n a	n/a
RefSeq (mRNA)	n/a	n/a
RefSeq (protein)	n/a	n/a
Location (UCSC)	Chr 17: 59.84 – 59.84 Mb	n/a
PubMed search		n/a
- Wikidata
View/Edit Human

microRNA 21 also known as hsa-mir-21 or miRNA21 is a mammalian microRNA that is encoded by the MIR21 gene.

== Gene ==
MIRN21 was one of the first mammalian microRNAs identified. The human microRNA-21 gene is located on the plus strand of chromosome 17q23.2 (55273409–55273480), within the coding gene TMEM49 (also known as vacuole membrane protein). Although it resides within the intronic region of this gene and shares the same direction of transcription, miR-21 has its own promoter regions and is independently transcribed. Its primary transcript (pri-miR-21) is approximately 3433 nucleotides in length. The precursor stem–loop structure of miR-21 (pre-miR-21) is located between nucleotides 2445 and 2516 of pri-miR-21.

== Structure ==
Pri-miR-21 is initially processed in the nucleus by the endonuclease Drosha, which cleaves it into the precursor form, pre-miR-21. This precursor is then exported into the cytosol, where it is further cleaved by the enzyme Dicer into a short RNA duplex. Although both strands are transcribed in equal abundance, only one strand—designated as mature miR-21—is selectively incorporated into the RNA-induced silencing complex (RISC), based on the thermodynamic stability of the duplex ends. The other strand, labeled miR-21*, is typically degraded. The mature miRNA then guides the RISC complex to target mRNAs, usually binding near-perfectly to sequences within the 3'UTR.

== Function ==
MicroRNA-21 is a highly conserved small noncoding RNA that plays a central role in regulating gene expression across a broad range of biological processes, including development, immune response, and cellular homeostasis. It modulates immune system activity by regulating T cell effector functions and maintaining the balance between Th1 and Th2 responses.

== Targets ==
A number of targets for microRNA-21 have been experimentally validated and most of them are tumor suppressors, Notable targets include:

- ANP32A,
- BTG2,
- Bcl2,
- P12/CDK2AP1,
- HNRPK,
- IL-12p35,
- JAG1,
- MEF2C,
- hMSH2,
- PDCD4,
- PTEN,
- RECK,
- RhoB,
- SMARCA4,
- TGFBRII,
- SPRY1,
- SPRY2,
- TP63, and
- Tropomyosin.

== Clinical significance ==
=== Cancer ===
miR-21 is frequently overexpressed in a wide variety of human cancers and is classified as a prototypical onco-miR. It promotes tumorigenesis, metastasis, and resistance to therapy by targeting a range of tumor suppressor genes and signaling pathways. Dysregulation of miR-21 is also implicated in various non-cancerous diseases, including cardiovascular and inflammatory conditions, underscoring its broad role in human pathology.

miR-21 is one of the most frequently upregulated miRNAs in solid tumours, and its high levels were first described in B cell lymphomas. Overall, miR-21 is considered to be a typical 'onco-miR', which acts by inhibiting the expression of phosphatases, which limit the activity of signalling pathways such as AKT and MAPK. As most of the targets of miR-21 are tumor suppressors, miR-21 is associated with a wide variety of cancers including that of lymphoma, breast, ovaries, cervix, colon, lung, liver, brain, esophagus, prostate, pancreas, and thyroid. In 2010, it was develop the first-in class in vivo model where a non-coding RNA (including a microRNA) is able to create and maintain a tumor in the first described onco-miRNA addiction. A 2014 meta-analysis of 36 studies evaluated circulating miR-21 as a biomarker of various carcinomas, finding it has potential as a tool for early diagnosis. miR-21 expression was associated with survival in 53 triple negative breast cancer patients. miR-21 can also be detected in human faeces from colorectal cancer patients. Additionally, it has been demonstrated as an independent prognostic factor in patients with pancreatic neuroendocrine neoplasms.

=== Cardiac disease ===
miR-21 has been shown to play important role in development of heart disease. It is one of the microRNAs whose expression is increased in failing murine and human hearts. Further, inhibition of microRNAs in mice using chemically modified and cholesterol-conjugated miRNA inhibitors (antagomirs) was shown to inhibit interstitial fibrosis and improve cardiac function in a pressure- overload cardiac disease mice model. Surprisingly, miR-21 global knock-out mice did not show any overt phenotype when compared with wild type mice with respect to cardiac stress response. Similarly, short (8-nt) oligonucleotides designed to inhibit miR-21 could not inhibit cardiac hypertrophy or fibrosis. In another study with a mouse model of acute myocardial infarction, miR-21 expression was found to be significantly lower in infarcted areas and overexpression of miR-21 in those mice via adenovirus-mediated gene transfer decreased myocardial infarct size. miR-21 has been hypothesized to be an intermediary in the effects of air pollution that lead to endothelial dysfunction and eventually to cardiac disease. Expression of miR-21 is negatively associated with exposure to PM10 air pollution and may mediate its effect on small blood vessels.
