= RECK =

Protein-coding gene in the species Homo sapiens

Identifiers
- Aliases: RECK, ST15, reversion inducing cysteine rich protein with kazal motifs
- External IDs: OMIM: 605227; MGI: 1855698; HomoloGene: 9622; GeneCards: RECK; OMA:RECK - orthologs

Gene location (Human)
Chr.	Chromosome 9 (human)
Band	9p13.3	Start	36,036,913 bp
Band	9p13.3	End	36,124,455 bp

Gene location (Mouse)
Chr.	Chromosome 4 (mouse)
Band	4|4 B1	Start	43,875,530 bp
Band	4|4 B1	End	43,944,806 bp
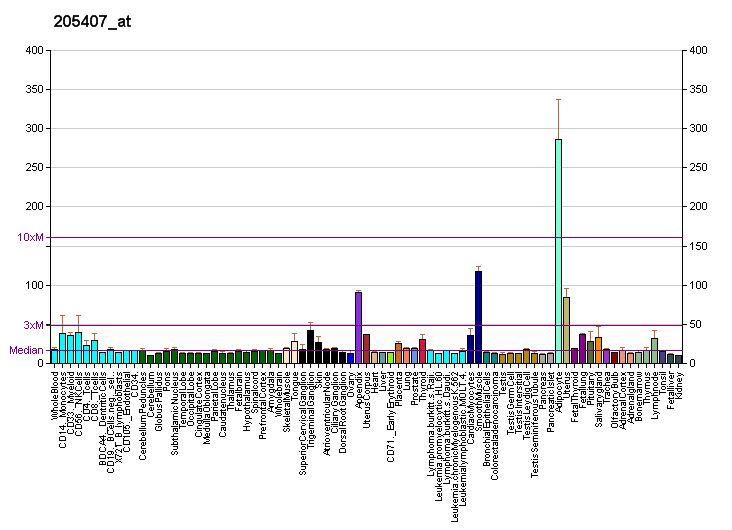
RNA expression pattern
Bgee	Human / Mouse (ortholog); Top expressed in: skin of hip; parietal pleura; skin of thigh; germinal epithelium; tibia; stromal cell of endometrium; visceral pleura; lactiferous duct; synovial joint; Achilles tendon / Top expressed in: iris; dermis; calvaria; left lung lobe; vas deferens; efferent ductule; sciatic nerve; skin of external ear; ciliary body; umbilical cord; More reference expression data
BioGPS	More reference expression data
Gene ontology
Molecular function	protein binding; metalloendopeptidase inhibitor activity; peptidase inhibitor activity; endopeptidase inhibitor activity; serine-type endopeptidase inhibitor activity; Wnt-protein binding; coreceptor activity involved in canonical Wnt signaling pathway
Cellular component	anchored component of membrane; membrane; extracellular region; plasma membrane; Wnt signalosome
Biological process	vasculature development; regulation of canonical Wnt signaling pathway; negative regulation of metalloendopeptidase activity; negative regulation of peptidase activity; negative regulation of cell migration; embryonic forelimb morphogenesis; embryo implantation; blood vessel maturation; extracellular matrix organization; sprouting angiogenesis; Wnt signaling pathway; regulation of angiogenesis; canonical Wnt signaling pathway; regulation of establishment of blood-brain barrier; positive regulation of canonical Wnt signaling pathway
Sources:Amigo / QuickGO
Orthologs
Species	Human	Mouse
Entrez	8434	53614
Ensembl	ENSG00000122707	ENSMUSG00000028476
UniProt	O95980	Q9Z0J1
RefSeq (mRNA)	NM_001316345; NM_001316346; NM_001316347; NM_001316348; NM_021111	NM_016678
RefSeq (protein)	NP_001303275.1; NP_001303276.1; NP_001303277.1; NP_001303274; NP_001303275 NP_001303276; NP_001303277; NP_066934	NP_057887
Location (UCSC)	Chr 9: 36.04 – 36.12 Mb	Chr 4: 43.88 – 43.94 Mb
PubMed search
- Wikidata
View/Edit Human	View/Edit Mouse

Reversion-inducing-cysteine-rich protein with kazal motifs, also known as RECK, is a human gene, thought to be a metastasis suppressor.

The protein encoded by this gene is a cysteine-rich, extracellular protein with protease inhibitor-like domains whose expression is suppressed strongly in many tumors and cells transformed by various kinds of oncogenes. In normal cells, this membrane-anchored glycoprotein may serve as a negative regulator for matrix metalloproteinase-9, a key enzyme involved in tumor invasion and metastasis. It is one of the targets of an oncomiR, MIRN21.
