= PTEN (gene) =

Tumor suppressor gene

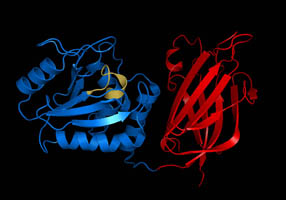

Identifiers
- Aliases: PTEN, 10q23del, BZS, CWS1, DEC, GLM2, MHAM, MMAC1, PTEN1, TEP1, phosphatase and tensin homolog, Phosphatase and tensin homolog, PTENbeta
- External IDs: OMIM: 601728; MGI: 109583; GeneCards: PTEN
Available structures
PDB	Ortholog search: PDBe RCSB
PDB	List of PDB id codes 4O1V, 1D5R, 2KYL, 5BZX, 5BUG, 5BZZ
Enzyme activity
EC #	BRENDA	ExPASy	KEGG	MetaCyc
3.1.3.16	↗	↗	↗	↗
3.1.3.48	↗	↗	↗	↗
3.1.3.67	↗	↗	↗	↗

Gene location (Human)
Chr.	Chromosome 10 (human)
Band	10q23.31	Start	87,862,638 bp
Band	10q23.31	End	87,971,930 bp

Gene location (Mouse)
Chr.	Chromosome 19 (mouse)
Band	19 C1|19 28.14 cM	Start	32,734,897 bp
Band	19 C1|19 28.14 cM	End	32,803,560 bp
RNA expression pattern
Bgee	Human / Mouse (ortholog); Top expressed in: sperm; endothelial cell; Achilles tendon; skin of arm; pancreatic epithelial cell; middle temporal gyrus; parietal pleura; mucosa of ileum; cardiac muscle tissue of right atrium; visceral pleura / Top expressed in: arcuate nucleus; intercostal muscle; median eminence; olfactory tubercle; granulocyte; human fetus; Rostral migratory stream; ankle; calvaria; subcutaneous adipose tissue; More reference expression data
BioGPS	n/a
Gene ontology
Molecular function	phosphoprotein phosphatase activity; phosphatidylinositol-3,4,5-trisphosphate 3-phosphatase activity; phosphatidylinositol-3-phosphatase activity; protein serine/threonine phosphatase activity; protein tyrosine phosphatase activity; protein tyrosine/serine/threonine phosphatase activity; enzyme binding; platelet-derived growth factor receptor binding; protein binding; protein kinase binding; phosphatidylinositol-3,4-bisphosphate 3-phosphatase activity; anaphase-promoting complex binding; identical protein binding; hydrolase activity; lipid binding; ubiquitin-specific protease binding; ionotropic glutamate receptor binding; protein tyrosine kinase binding; inositol-1,3,4,5-tetrakisphosphate 3-phosphatase activity; PDZ domain binding
Cellular component	cytoplasm; postsynaptic membrane; extracellular region; mitochondrion; neuron projection; cytoplasmic side of plasma membrane; nucleus; cell projection; dendritic spine; myelin sheath adaxonal region; Schmidt-Lanterman incisure; apical plasma membrane; plasma membrane; PML body; nucleoplasm; cytosol; postsynaptic cytosol
Biological process	multicellular organismal response to stress; regulation of neuron projection development; response to zinc ion; positive regulation of TRAIL-activated apoptotic signaling pathway; response to organic substance; negative regulation of G1/S transition of mitotic cell cycle; regulation of B cell apoptotic process; angiogenesis; positive regulation of ERK1 and ERK2 cascade; negative regulation of epithelial cell proliferation; long-term depression; positive regulation of excitatory postsynaptic potential; cell population proliferation; response to ethanol; neuron projection development; cellular response to hypoxia; negative regulation of cell size; negative regulation of cell population proliferation; prepulse inhibition; regulation of myeloid cell apoptotic process; male mating behavior; locomotory behavior; dentate gyrus development; positive regulation of apoptotic signaling pathway; inositol phosphate metabolic process; response to arsenic-containing substance; memory; forebrain morphogenesis; dendritic spine morphogenesis; development of the heart; central nervous system development; negative regulation of axonogenesis; regulation of cellular localization; synapse maturation; learning or memory; social behavior; synapse assembly; cellular response to decreased oxygen levels; prostate gland growth; platelet-derived growth factor receptor signaling pathway; negative regulation of dendritic spine morphogenesis; brain morphogenesis; negative regulation of protein phosphorylation; regulation of cyclin-dependent protein serine/threonine kinase activity; regulation of cellular component size; response to nutrient; negative regulation of synaptic vesicle clustering; postsynaptic density assembly; protein dephosphorylation; protein stabilization; positive regulation of DNA-binding transcription factor activity; negative regulation of apoptotic process; response to glucose; nervous system development; adult behavior; phosphatidylinositol dephosphorylation; positive regulation of ubiquitin-dependent protein catabolic process; response to inorganic substance; canonical Wnt signaling pathway; phosphatidylinositol biosynthetic process; negative regulation of organ growth; negative regulation of ribosome biogenesis; dephosphorylation; locomotor rhythm; central nervous system myelin maintenance; regulation of axon regeneration; response to estradiol; response to ATP; negative regulation of phagocytosis; response to organic cyclic compound; protein kinase B signaling; cardiac muscle tissue development; lipid metabolism; ageing; neuron-neuron synaptic transmission; negative regulation of excitatory postsynaptic potential; presynaptic membrane assembly; regulation of cell cycle; Maternal behavior; rhythmic synaptic transmission; positive regulation of cell population proliferation; positive regulation of apoptotic process; negative regulation of ERK1 and ERK2 cascade; cell migration; negative regulation of myelination; inositol phosphate dephosphorylation; regulation of synaptic transmission, GABAergic; endothelial cell migration; central nervous system neuron axonogenesis; long-term potentiation; peptidyl-tyrosine dephosphorylation; negative regulation of axon regeneration; negative regulation of cardiac muscle cell proliferation; positive regulation of ubiquitin protein ligase activity; protein deubiquitination; negative regulation of epithelial to mesenchymal transition; negative regulation of keratinocyte migration; cellular response to electrical stimulus; negative regulation of wound healing, spreading of epidermal cells; negative regulation of phosphatidylinositol 3-kinase signaling; positive regulation of gene expression; positive regulation of cardiac muscle cell apoptotic process; response to activity; cellular response to insulin stimulus; cellular response to leptin stimulus; positive regulation of neuron differentiation; cellular response to ethanol; negative regulation of potassium ion transmembrane transporter activity; cellular response to nerve growth factor stimulus; cellular response to insulin-like growth factor stimulus; negative regulation of signaling receptor activity; negative regulation of protein kinase B signaling; apoptotic process; negative regulation of cell migration; regulation of protein stability; negative regulation of focal adhesion assembly; negative regulation of vascular associated smooth muscle cell proliferation; transcription initiation from RNA polymerase II promoter; negative regulation of cyclin-dependent protein serine/threonine kinase activity; negative regulation of neuron projection development
Sources:Amigo / QuickGO
Orthologs
Databases	NCBI: entry; OMA: entry
Species	Human	Mouse
Entrez	5728	19211
Ensembl	ENSG00000171862; ENSG00000284792	ENSMUSG00000013663
UniProt	P60484	O08586
RefSeq (mRNA)	NM_000314; NM_001304717; NM_001304718	NM_008960; NM_177096
RefSeq (protein)	NP_000305; NP_001291646; NP_001291647; NP_000305.3	NP_032986
Location (UCSC)	Chr 10: 87.86 – 87.97 Mb	Chr 19: 32.73 – 32.8 Mb
PubMed search
- Wikidata
View/Edit Human	View/Edit Mouse

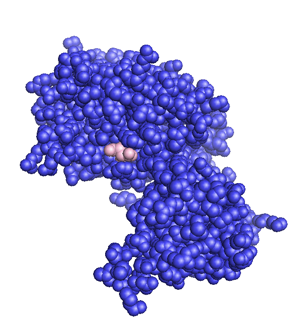
Space-filling model of the PTEN protein (blue) complexed with tartaric acid (brown)

PTEN (phosphatase and tensin homolog) is a gene found in humans which encodes for the protein PTEN, also known as phosphatidylinositol-3,4,5-trisphosphate 3-phosphatase. PTEN acts as a tumor suppressor gene through the action of its phosphatase protein product. Mutations of this gene are linked to many cancers, specifically glioblastoma, lung cancer, breast cancer, and prostate cancer. Genes corresponding to PTEN (orthologs) have been identified in most mammals for which complete genome data are available.

The PTEN protein contains both a tensin-like domain and a catalytic domain similar to that of the dual specificity phosphatases. Unlike most protein tyrosine phosphatases, the PTEN protein preferentially dephosphorylates phosphoinositide substrates. Specifically, it catalyzes the conversion of phosphatidylinositol-3,4,5-trisphosphate (PIP_{3}) to phosphatidylinositol 4,5-bisphosphate (PIP_{2}). Decreased PIP_{3} levels, in turn, lead to decreased activation of the Akt/PKB signaling pathway, an important pathway in cell growth, survival, and proliferation.

== Function ==
PTEN protein is primarily a lipid phosphatase, which dephosphorylates phosphatidylinositol (3,4,5)-trisphosphate (PtdIns (3,4,5)P_{3} or PIP_{3}) into the biphosphate product phosphatidylinositol 4,5-bisphosphate (PtdIns(4,5)P2 or PIP_{2}). PTEN specifically catalyses the dephosphorylation of the 3` phosphate of the inositol ring in PIP_{3}. This dephosphorylation results in inhibition of the Akt signaling pathway, which plays an important role in regulating cellular behaviors such as cell growth, survival, and migration.

PTEN also has weak protein phosphatase activity, which is also crucial for its role as a tumor suppressor. PTEN's protein phosphatase activity may be involved in the regulation of the cell cycle, preventing cells from growing and dividing too rapidly. There have been numerous reported protein substrates for PTEN, including IRS1 and Dishevelled.

PTEN appears to play a critical role in the DNA damage response and the repair of DNA damage, particularly in double-strand break repair and nucleotide excision repair.

== Protein structure ==
The structure of the core of PTEN (solved by X-ray crystallography, see figure) reveals that it consists primarily of a phosphatase domain and a C2 domain. The phosphatase domain contains the active site, which carries out the enzymatic function of the protein, while the C2 domain binds the phospholipid membrane. Thus PTEN binds the membrane through both its phosphatase and C2 domains, bringing the active site to the membrane-bound PIP_{3} to dephosphorylate it.

The two domains of PTEN, a protein tyrosine phosphatase domain and a C2 domain, are inherited together as a single unit and thus constitute a superdomain, not only in PTEN but also in various other proteins in fungi, plants and animals, for example, tensin proteins and auxilin.

The active site of PTEN consists of three loops, the TI Loop, the P Loop, and the WPD Loop, all named following the PTPB1 nomenclature. Together they form an unusually deep and wide pocket which allows PTEN to accommodate the bulky phosphatidylinositol 3,4,5-trisphosphate substrate. The dephosphorylation reaction mechanism of PTEN is thought to proceed through a phosphoenzyme intermediate, with the formation of a phosphodiester bond on the active site cysteine, C124.

Not present in the crystal structure of PTEN is a short 10-amino-acid unstructured region N-terminal of the phosphatase domain (from residues 6 to 15), known variously as the PIP_{2} Binding Domain (PBD) or PIP_{2} Binding Motif (PBM). This region increases PTEN's affinity for the plasma membrane by binding to phosphatidylinositol 4,5-bisphosphate, or possibly any anionic lipid.

Also not present in the crystal structure is the intrinsically disordered C-terminal region (CTR) (spanning residues 353–403). The CTR is constitutively phosphorylated at various positions that effect various aspects of PTEN, including its ability to bind to lipid membranes, and also act as either a protein or lipid phosphatase.

Additionally, PTEN can also be expressed as PTEN-L (known as PTEN-Long, or PTEN-α), a leucine initiator alternative start site variant, which adds an additional 173 amino acids to the N-terminus of PTEN. The exact role of this 173-amino acid extension is not yet known, either causing PTEN to be secreted from the cell, or to interact with the mitochondria. The N-terminal extension has been predicted to be largely disordered, although there is evidence that there is some structure in the last twenty amino acids of the extension (most proximal to the start methionine of PTEN).

== Clinical significance ==
=== Cancer ===
PTEN is one of the most commonly lost tumor suppressors in human cancer; up to 70% of men with prostate cancer are estimated to have lost a copy of the PTEN gene at the time of diagnosis. A number of studies have found increased frequency of PTEN loss in tumours which are more highly visible on diagnostic scans such as mpMRI, potentially reflecting increased proliferation and cell density in these tumours.

During tumor development, mutations and deletions of PTEN occur that inactivate its enzymatic activity leading to increased cell proliferation and reduced cell death. Frequent genetic inactivation of PTEN occurs in glioblastoma, endometrial cancer, and prostate cancer; and reduced expression is found in many other tumor types such as lung and breast cancer. Furthermore, PTEN mutation also causes a variety of inherited predispositions to cancer.

=== Non-cancerous neoplasia ===
Researchers have identified more than 70 mutations in the PTEN gene in people with Cowden syndrome. These mutations can be changes in a small number of base pairs or, in some cases, deletions of a large number of base pairs. Most of these mutations cause the PTEN gene to make a protein that does not function properly or does not work at all. The defective protein is unable to stop cell division or signal abnormal cells to die, which can lead to tumor growth, particularly in the breast, thyroid, or uterus.

Mutations in the PTEN gene cause several other disorders that, like Cowden syndrome, are characterized by the development of non-cancerous tumors called hamartomas. These disorders include Bannayan–Riley–Ruvalcaba syndrome and Proteus-like syndrome. Together, the disorders caused by PTEN mutations are called PTEN hamartoma tumor syndromes, or PHTS. Mutations responsible for these syndromes cause the resulting protein to be non-functional or absent. The defective protein allows the cell to divide in an uncontrolled way and prevents damaged cells from dying, which can lead to the growth of tumors.

=== Brain function and autism ===
Defects of the PTEN gene have been cited to be a potential cause of autism spectrum disorders.

When defective, PTEN protein interacts with the protein of a second gene known as Tp53 to dampen energy production in neurons. This severe stress leads to a spike in harmful mitochondrial DNA changes and abnormal levels of energy production in the cerebellum and hippocampus, brain regions critical for social behavior and cognition. When PTEN protein is insufficient, its interaction with p53 triggers deficiencies and defects in other proteins that also have been found in patients with learning disabilities including autism. People with autism and PTEN mutations may have macrocephaly (unusually large heads).

Patients with defective PTEN can develop cerebellar mass lesions called dysplastic gangliocytomas or Lhermitte–Duclos disease.

=== Cell regeneration ===
PTEN's strong link to cell growth inhibition is being studied as a possible therapeutic target in tissues that do not traditionally regenerate in mature animals, such as central neurons. PTEN deletion has been shown to promote nerve regeneration in mice.

== As a drug target ==
=== PTEN inhibitors ===
Bisperoxovanadium compounds may have a neuroprotective effect after CNS injury. PTEN is inhibited by sarcopoterium.

PTEN is one of the targets of the oncomiR, MIRN21.

== Cell lines ==
Cell lines with known PTEN mutations include:

- prostate: LNCaP, PC-3
- kidney: 786-O
- glioblastoma: U87MG
- breast : MB-MDA-468, BT549
- bladder: J82, UMUC-3
- endometrium: MFE-296 https://www.cellosaurus.org/CVCL_1406

== Interactions ==
PTEN has been shown to interact with:

- CSNK2A2,
- CSNK2A1,
- MAGI3
- MVP,
- NEDD4,
- NR3C4,
- P53, and
- PTK2.

== See also ==
- Multiple hamartoma syndrome
