= Mir-32 microRNA precursor family =

Precursor microRNA family

mir-32

Identifiers
- Symbol: mir-32
- Rfam: RF00666
- miRBase family: MIPF0000069

Other data
- RNA type: microRNA
- Domain: Eukaryota;
- PDB structures: PDBe

In molecular biology mir-32 microRNA is a short RNA molecule. MicroRNAs function to regulate the expression levels of other genes by several mechanisms.

== See also ==
- MicroRNA
