= VMP1 =

Protein-coding gene in the species Homo sapiens

Identifiers
- Aliases: VMP1, EPG3, TANGO5, TMEM49, vacuole membrane protein 1
- External IDs: OMIM: 611753; MGI: 1923159; GeneCards: VMP1

Gene location (Human)
Chr.	Chromosome 17 (human)
Band	17q23.1	Start	59,707,192 bp
Band	17q23.1	End	59,842,255 bp

Gene location (Mouse)
Chr.	Chromosome 11 (mouse)
Band	11|11 C	Start	86,474,691 bp
Band	11|11 C	End	86,574,662 bp
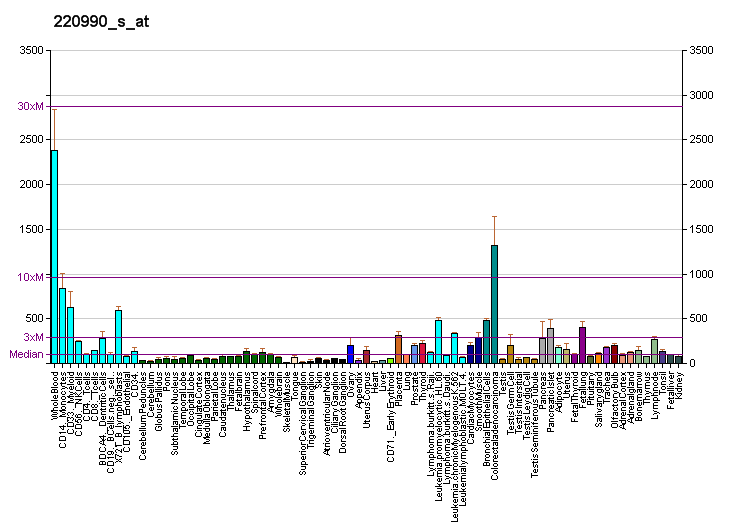
RNA expression pattern
Bgee	Human / Mouse (ortholog); Top expressed in: blood; monocyte; epithelium of colon; gallbladder; rectum; mucosa of urinary bladder; islet of Langerhans; pericardium; upper lobe of left lung; appendix / Top expressed in: epithelium of small intestine; stroma of bone marrow; gastrula; lobe of prostate; jejunum; yolk sac; ileum; duodenum; decidua; lacrimal gland; More reference expression data
BioGPS	More reference expression data
Gene ontology
Molecular function	protein binding
Cellular component	vacuolar membrane; integral component of membrane; vacuole; plasma membrane; autophagosome membrane; nucleolus; endoplasmic reticulum; membrane; phagophore assembly site; endoplasmic reticulum-Golgi intermediate compartment membrane
Biological process	autophagy; cell adhesion; Golgi organization; embryo implantation; endoplasmic reticulum organization; exocytosis; cell junction assembly; cell-cell adhesion; autophagosome assembly
Sources:Amigo / QuickGO
Orthologs
Databases	NCBI: entry; OMA: entry
Species	Human	Mouse
Entrez	81671	75909
Ensembl	ENSG00000062716	ENSMUSG00000018171
UniProt	Q96GC9	Q99KU0
RefSeq (mRNA)	NM_001329394; NM_001329395; NM_001329396; NM_001329397; NM_001329398 NM_001329399; NM_001329400; NM_001329401; NM_001329402; NM_030938	NM_029478; NM_001356531; NM_001379040; NM_001379041
RefSeq (protein)	NP_001316323; NP_001316324; NP_001316325; NP_001316326; NP_001316327 NP_001316328; NP_001316329; NP_001316330; NP_001316331; NP_112200	NP_083754; NP_001343460; NP_001365969; NP_001365970
Location (UCSC)	Chr 17: 59.71 – 59.84 Mb	Chr 11: 86.47 – 86.57 Mb
PubMed search
- Wikidata
View/Edit Human	View/Edit Mouse

Vacuole membrane protein 1 is a protein that in humans is encoded by the VMP1 gene.
