= PPP2R5E =

Protein-coding gene in the species Homo sapiens

Identifiers
- Aliases: PPP2R5E, protein phosphatase 2 regulatory subunit B'epsilon, B56epsilon, B56E
- External IDs: OMIM: 601647; MGI: 1349473; GeneCards: PPP2R5E

Gene location (Human)
Chr.	Chromosome 14 (human)
Band	14q23.2	Start	63,371,364 bp
Band	14q23.2	End	63,543,377 bp

Gene location (Mouse)
Chr.	Chromosome 12 (mouse)
Band	12|12 C3	Start	75,497,655 bp
Band	12|12 C3	End	75,643,019 bp
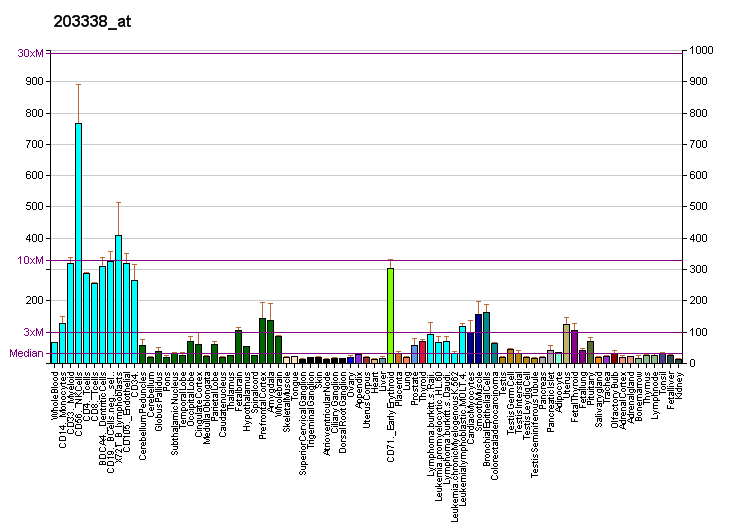
RNA expression pattern
Bgee	Human / Mouse (ortholog); Top expressed in: pancreatic ductal cell; mucosa of ileum; tibialis anterior muscle; ganglionic eminence; buccal mucosa cell; endothelial cell; deltoid muscle; pericardium; ventricular zone; Brodmann area 23 / Top expressed in: Rostral migratory stream; retinal pigment epithelium; facial motor nucleus; ciliary body; human fetus; hand; ventromedial nucleus; medial ganglionic eminence; left lung lobe; nucleus accumbens; More reference expression data
BioGPS	More reference expression data
Gene ontology
Molecular function	protein binding; protein phosphatase regulator activity; protein phosphatase activator activity
Cellular component	protein phosphatase type 2A complex; cytoplasm; cytosol; nucleus
Biological process	signal transduction; regulation of phosphoprotein phosphatase activity; regulation of protein autophosphorylation; protein dephosphorylation
Sources:Amigo / QuickGO
Orthologs
Databases	NCBI: entry; OMA: entry
Species	Human	Mouse
Entrez	5529	26932
Ensembl	ENSG00000154001	ENSMUSG00000021051
UniProt	Q16537	Q61151
RefSeq (mRNA)	NM_001282179; NM_001282180; NM_001282181; NM_001282182; NM_006246 NM_001354926	NM_012024
RefSeq (protein)	NP_001269108; NP_001269109; NP_001269110; NP_001269111; NP_006237 NP_001341855	NP_036154
Location (UCSC)	Chr 14: 63.37 – 63.54 Mb	Chr 12: 75.5 – 75.64 Mb
PubMed search
- Wikidata
View/Edit Human	View/Edit Mouse

Serine/threonine-protein phosphatase 2A 56 kDa regulatory subunit epsilon isoform is an enzyme that in humans is encoded by the PPP2R5E gene.

== Function ==
The product of this gene belongs to the phosphatase 2A regulatory subunit B family. Protein phosphatase 2A is one of the four major Ser/Thr phosphatases, and it is implicated in the negative control of cell growth and division. It consists of a common heteromeric core enzyme, which is composed of a catalytic subunit and a constant regulatory subunit, that associates with a variety of regulatory subunits. The B regulatory subunit might modulate substrate selectivity and catalytic activity. This gene encodes an epsilon isoform of the regulatory subunit B56 subfamily.

== Interactions ==
PPP2R5E has been shown to interact with PPP2R1B and PPP2CA.
