= Phosphatidylinositol-3,4,5-trisphosphate 3-phosphatase =

Class of enzymes

phosphatidylinositol-3,4,5-trisphosphate 3-phosphatase

Identifiers
- EC no.: 3.1.3.67

Databases
- IntEnz: IntEnz view
- BRENDA: BRENDA entry
- ExPASy: NiceZyme view
- KEGG: KEGG entry
- MetaCyc: metabolic pathway
- PRIAM: profile
- PDB structures: RCSB PDB PDBe PDBsum
- Gene Ontology: AmiGO / QuickGO
Search
- PMC: articles
- PubMed: articles
- NCBI: proteins

The enzyme phosphatidylinositol-3,4,5-trisphosphate 3-phosphatase (EC 3.1.3.67) catalyzes the chemical reaction

1-phosphatidyl-1D-myo-inositol 3,4,5-trisphosphate + H_{2}O = 1-phosphatidyl-1D-myoinositol 4,5-bisphosphate + phosphate

This enzyme class belongs to the family of hydrolases, specifically those acting on phosphoric monoester bonds. The systematic name is 1-phosphatidyl-D-myoinositol-3,4,5-trisphosphate 3-phosphohydrolase. Other names in common use include PTEN, MMAC1, and phosphatidylinositol-3,4,5-trisphosphate 3-phosphohydrolase. PTEN also refers to a member of the class, phosphatase and tensin homolog. This enzyme participates in 10 metabolic pathways: inositol phosphate metabolism, phosphatidylinositol signaling system, p53 signaling pathway, focal adhesion, tight junction, endometrial cancer, glioma, prostate cancer, melanoma, and small cell lung cancer. It employs one cofactor, magnesium.
