= Mir-17 microRNA precursor family =

Precursor microRNA family

mir-17 microRNA precursor family
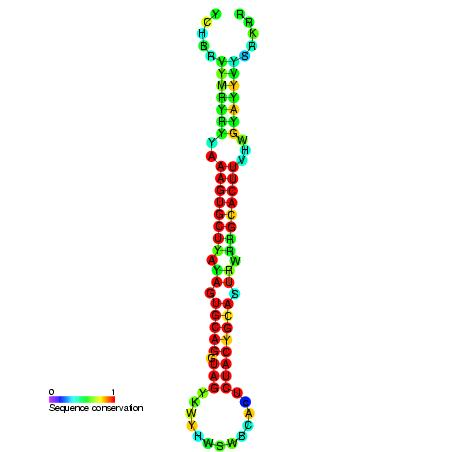
- Predicted secondary structure and sequence conservation of mir-17

Identifiers
- Symbol: mir-17
- Rfam: RF00051
- miRBase: MI0000071
- miRBase family: MIPF0000001

Other data
- RNA type: Gene; miRNA
- Domain: Eukaryota
- GO: GO:0035195 GO:0035068
- SO: SO:0001244
- PDB structures: PDBe

The miR-17 microRNA precursor family are a group of related small non-coding RNA genes called microRNAs that regulate gene expression. The microRNA precursor miR-17 family, includes miR-20a/b, miR-93, and miR-106a/b. With the exception of miR-93, these microRNAs are produced from several microRNA gene clusters, which apparently arose from a series of ancient evolutionary genetic duplication events, and also include members of the miR-19, and miR-25 families. These clusters are transcribed as long non-coding RNA transcripts that are processed to form ~70 nucleotide microRNA precursors, that are subsequently processed by the Dicer enzyme to give a ~22 nucleotide products. The mature microRNA products are thought to regulate expression levels of other genes through complementarity to the 3' UTR of specific target messenger RNA.

The paralogous miRNA gene clusters that give rise to miR-17 family microRNAs (miR-17~92, miR-106a~363, and miR-106b~25) have been implicated in a wide variety of malignancies and are sometimes referred to as oncomirs. The oncogenic potential of these non-protein encoding genes was first identified in mouse viral tumorigenesis screens. In humans, the activating mutations of miR-17~92 have been identified in non-Hodgkin's lymphoma, whereas the miRNA constituents of the clusters are overexpressed in a multiple cancer types. High level expression of miR-17 family members induces cell proliferation, whereas deletion of the miR-17~92 cluster, in mice, is lethal and causes lung and lymphoid cell developmental defects. In addition, in the nasopharyngeal carcinoma cell line, miR-20a and miR-20b has been shown to target the 3' UTR of vascular endothelial growth factor (VEGF) and repress the expression of VEGF, which is an important angiogenic factor. miR-20a detection in human faeces could be a non-invasive screening marker for colorectal cancer.
