= BCL7A =

Protein-coding gene in humans

Identifiers
- Aliases: BCL7A, BCL7, B-cell CLL/lymphoma 7A, BCL tumor suppressor 7A, BAF complex component, BAF chromatin remodeling complex subunit SMARCJ1
- External IDs: OMIM: 601406; MGI: 1924295; GeneCards: BCL7A

Gene location (Human)
Chr.	Chromosome 12 (human)
Band	12q24.31	Start	122,019,422 bp
Band	12q24.31	End	122,062,044 bp

Gene location (Mouse)
Chr.	Chromosome 5 (mouse)
Band	5|5 F	Start	123,481,897 bp
Band	5|5 F	End	123,513,055 bp
RNA expression pattern
Bgee	Human / Mouse (ortholog); Top expressed in: ganglionic eminence; ventricular zone; prefrontal cortex; superior frontal gyrus; Brodmann area 9; cerebellum; cerebellar cortex; cerebellar hemisphere; right hemisphere of cerebellum; primary visual cortex / Top expressed in: hand; ganglionic eminence; superior cervical ganglion; utricle; ventricular zone; olfactory system; olfactory epithelium; prefrontal cortex; piriform cortex; primary motor cortex; More reference expression data
BioGPS	n/a
Gene ontology
Molecular function	protein binding; molecular function
Cellular component	cellular component
Biological process	negative regulation of transcription, DNA-templated
Sources:Amigo / QuickGO
Orthologs
Databases	NCBI: entry; OMA: entry
Species	Human	Mouse
Entrez	605	77045
Ensembl	ENSG00000282873; ENSG00000110987	ENSMUSG00000029438
UniProt	Q4VC05	Q9CXE2
RefSeq (mRNA)	NM_020993; NM_001024808	NM_029850
RefSeq (protein)	NP_001019979; NP_066273	NP_084126
Location (UCSC)	Chr 12: 122.02 – 122.06 Mb	Chr 5: 123.48 – 123.51 Mb
PubMed search
- Wikidata
View/Edit Human	View/Edit Mouse

B-cell CLL/lymphoma 7 protein family member A is a protein that in humans is encoded by the BCL7A gene located in the chromosome 12 (Cytogenetic band: 12q24.31).

== Function ==
This gene codifies for a protein that belongs to the SWI/SNF chromatin remodelling complex, a complex that is able to modify the interactions between DNA and histones using the energy of the ATP hydrolysis. It has found recurrently mutated in lymphomas and silenced by promoter hypermetylation in haematological malignancies.

== See also ==
- B-cell lymphoma
