= OTUD7B =

Protein-coding gene in humans

Identifiers
- Aliases: OTUD7B, CEZANNE, ZA20D1, OTU deubiquitinase 7B
- External IDs: OMIM: 611748; MGI: 2654703; GeneCards: OTUD7B
Enzyme activity
EC #	BRENDA	ExPASy	KEGG	MetaCyc
3.4.19.12	↗	↗	↗	↗

Gene location (Human)
Chr.	Chromosome 1 (human)
Band	1q21.2	Start	149,937,812 bp
Band	1q21.2	End	150,010,726 bp

Gene location (Mouse)
Chr.	Chromosome 3 (mouse)
Band	3|3 F2.1	Start	96,011,839 bp
Band	3|3 F2.1	End	96,068,446 bp
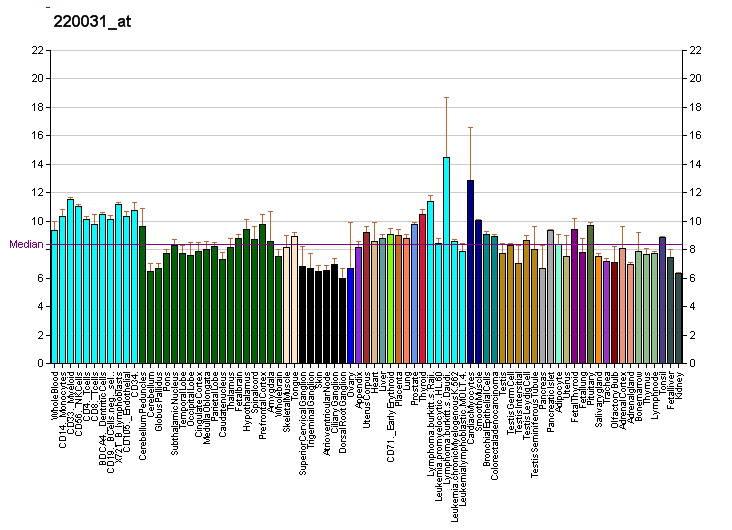
RNA expression pattern
Bgee	Human / Mouse (ortholog); Top expressed in: buccal mucosa cell; internal globus pallidus; sural nerve; secondary oocyte; tendon of biceps brachii; corpus callosum; inferior ganglion of vagus nerve; C1 segment; Skeletal muscle tissue of biceps brachii; epithelium of colon / Top expressed in: blood; retinal pigment epithelium; sciatic nerve; right lung lobe; neural layer of retina; spermatid; lumbar subsegment of spinal cord; spermatocyte; triceps brachii muscle; muscle of thigh; More reference expression data
BioGPS	More reference expression data
Gene ontology
Molecular function	DNA binding; cysteine-type peptidase activity; zinc ion binding; metal ion binding; peptidase activity; K63-linked polyubiquitin modification-dependent protein binding; protein binding; thiol-dependent deubiquitinase; hydrolase activity; Lys48-specific deubiquitinase activity
Cellular component	cytoplasm; nucleus; cytosol
Biological process	mucosal immune response; negative regulation of protein localization to nucleus; protein K48-linked deubiquitination; protein deubiquitination involved in ubiquitin-dependent protein catabolic process; immune system process; negative regulation of transcription by RNA polymerase II; negative regulation of I-kappaB kinase/NF-kappaB signaling; proteolysis; negative regulation of interleukin-8 production; protein K63-linked deubiquitination; immune response; protein deubiquitination; protein K11-linked deubiquitination; adaptive immune response
Sources:Amigo / QuickGO
Orthologs
Databases	NCBI: entry; OMA: entry
Species	Human	Mouse
Entrez	56957	229603
Ensembl	ENSG00000264522	ENSMUSG00000038495
UniProt	Q6GQQ9	B2RUR8
RefSeq (mRNA)	NM_020205	NM_001025613; NM_001025614
RefSeq (protein)	NP_064590	NP_001020784; NP_001020785
Location (UCSC)	Chr 1: 149.94 – 150.01 Mb	Chr 3: 96.01 – 96.07 Mb
PubMed search
- Wikidata
View/Edit Human	View/Edit Mouse

OTU domain-containing protein 7B is a protein that in humans is encoded by the OTUD7B gene.
