= BCL6B =

Protein-coding gene in the species Homo sapiens

Identifiers
- Aliases: BCL6B, BAZF, ZBTB28, ZNF62, B-cell CLL/lymphoma 6B, B cell CLL/lymphoma 6B, transcription repressor, BCL6B transcription repressor
- External IDs: OMIM: 608992; MGI: 1278332; GeneCards: BCL6B

Gene location (Human)
| Chr. | Chromosome 17 (human) |
| Band | 17p13.1 | Start | 7,023,050 bp |
| Band | 17p13.1 | End | 7,030,290 bp |

Gene location (Mouse)
| Chr. | Chromosome 11 (mouse) |
| Band | 11|11 B3 | Start | 70,114,954 bp |
| Band | 11|11 B3 | End | 70,120,624 bp |
RNA expression pattern
| Bgee | Human / Mouse (ortholog); Top expressed in: upper lobe of left lung; apex of heart; right lung; gonad; gallbladder; subcutaneous adipose tissue; tendon of biceps brachii; left ventricle; lower lobe of lung; left lobe of thyroid gland / Top expressed in: glomerulus; left lung lobe; atrium; renal vein; glomerular capillary; aortic valve; ascending aorta; endocardial cushion; vasa recta; endothelial cell of lymphatic vessel; More reference expression data |
| BioGPS | n/a |
Gene ontology
| Molecular function | DNA binding; RNA polymerase II transcription regulatory region sequence-specific DNA binding; DNA-binding transcription repressor activity, RNA polymerase II-specific; metal ion binding; nucleic acid binding; DNA-binding transcription factor activity, RNA polymerase II-specific; protein binding |
| Cellular component | nucleus |
| Biological process | negative regulation of transcription by RNA polymerase II; type 2 immune response; regulation of cell population proliferation; regulation of inflammatory response; regulation of cell differentiation |
Sources:Amigo / QuickGO
Orthologs
| Databases | NCBI: entry; OMA: entry |
| Species | Human | Mouse |
| Entrez | 255877 | 12029 |
| Ensembl | ENSG00000161940 | ENSMUSG00000000317 |
| UniProt | Q8N143 | O88282 |
| RefSeq (mRNA) | NM_181844 | NM_007528 |
| RefSeq (protein) | NP_862827; NP_862827.1 | NP_031554 |
| Location (UCSC) | Chr 17: 7.02 – 7.03 Mb | Chr 11: 70.11 – 70.12 Mb |
| PubMed search |
- Wikidata
| View/Edit Human | View/Edit Mouse |

B-cell CLL/lymphoma 6 member B protein is a protein that in humans is encoded by the BCL6B gene.
