= MiRBase =

Biological database

miRBase

Content
- Description: microRNA database

Contact
- Research center: University of Manchester
- Authors: Ana Kozomara
- Primary citation: Kozomara & al. (2011)
- Release date: 2010

Access
- Website: www.mirbase.org

In bioinformatics, miRBase is a biological database that acts as an archive of microRNA sequences and annotations. As of September 2010 it contained information about 15,172 microRNAs. This number has risen to 38,589 by March 2018. The miRBase registry provides a centralised system for assigning new names to microRNA genes.

miRBase grew from the microRNA registry resource set up by Sam Griffiths-Jones in 2003.

According to Ana Kozomara and Sam Griffiths-Jones miRBase has five aims:

1. To provide a consistent naming system for microRNAs
2. To provide a central place collecting all known microRNA sequences
3. To provide human and computer readable information for each microRNA
4. To provide primary evidence for each microRNA
5. To aggregate and link to microRNA target information

MiRBase contains miRNAs belonging of various species belonging to Alveolata, Chromalveolata, Metazoa, Mycetozoa, Viridiplantae and Viruses. For the Viridiplantae, in release 21 (2014) data is available for 73 species. This includes 4800 unique mature miRNAs and 8480 precursor sequences.

The current version of MiRBase is release 22 (March 2018).
