= PI4KB =

Protein-coding gene in humans

Identifiers
- Aliases: PI4KB, NPIK, PI4K-BETA, PI4K92, PI4KBETA, PI4KIIIBETA, PIK4CB, phosphatidylinositol 4-kinase beta, PI4KIII
- External IDs: OMIM: 602758; MGI: 1334433; GeneCards: PI4KB
Available structures
PDB	Ortholog search: PDBe RCSB
PDB	List of PDB id codes 4D0L, 4D0M, 4WAE, 4WAG, 5C4G, 5C46, 5EUQ
Enzyme activity
EC #	BRENDA	ExPASy	KEGG	MetaCyc
2.7.1.67	↗	↗	↗	↗

Gene location (Human)
Chr.	Chromosome 1 (human)
Band	1q21.3	Start	151,291,797 bp
Band	1q21.3	End	151,327,715 bp

Gene location (Mouse)
Chr.	Chromosome 3 (mouse)
Band	3|3 F2.1	Start	94,882,042 bp
Band	3|3 F2.1	End	94,914,154 bp
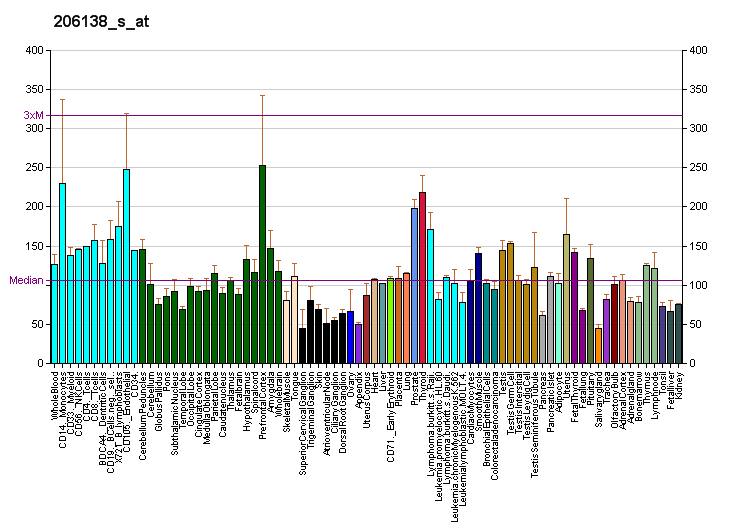

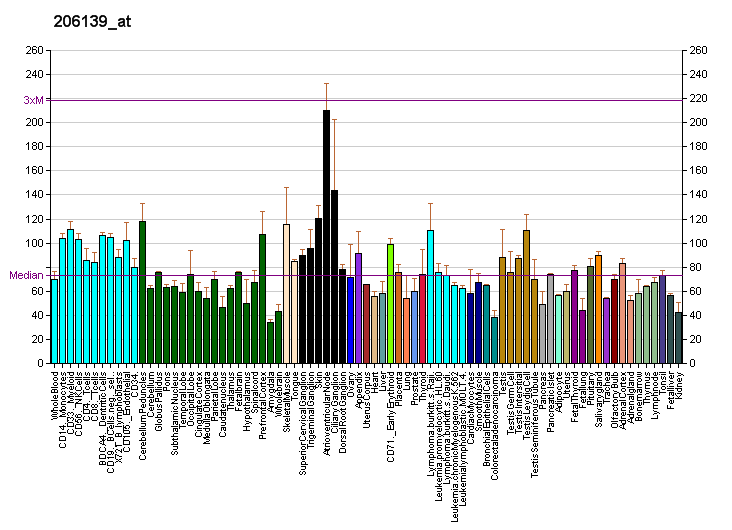

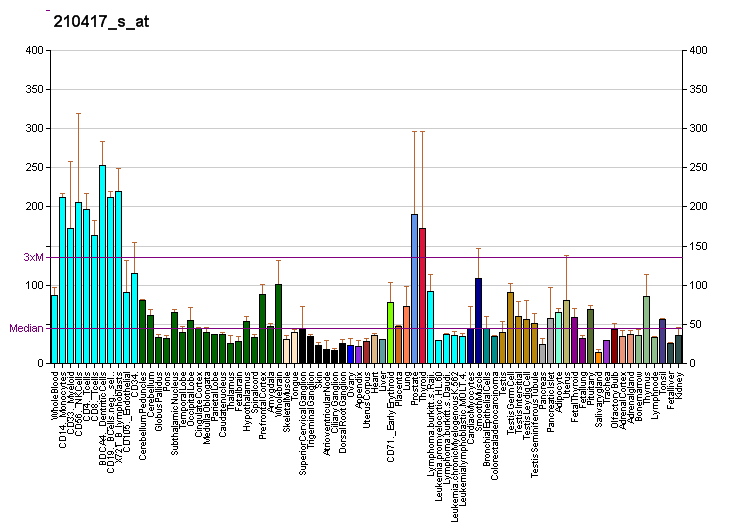
RNA expression pattern
Bgee	Human / Mouse (ortholog); Top expressed in: right lobe of thyroid gland; tibial nerve; left lobe of thyroid gland; right uterine tube; body of uterus; secondary oocyte; canal of the cervix; right ovary; left ovary; ectocervix / Top expressed in: dentate gyrus of hippocampal formation granule cell; granulocyte; primary visual cortex; neural layer of retina; superior frontal gyrus; decidua; ventricular zone; muscle of thigh; esophagus; spermatocyte; More reference expression data
BioGPS	More reference expression data
Gene ontology
Molecular function	ATP binding; protein binding; kinase activity; nucleotide binding; transferase activity; 14-3-3 protein binding; 1-phosphatidylinositol 4-kinase activity
Cellular component	endomembrane system; mitochondrial outer membrane; rough endoplasmic reticulum membrane; endosome; perinuclear region of cytoplasm; cytosol; endoplasmic reticulum; cytoplasm; Golgi apparatus; mitochondrion; membrane; Golgi membrane; intracellular anatomical structure
Biological process	phosphatidylinositol biosynthetic process; phosphatidylinositol phosphate biosynthetic process; receptor-mediated endocytosis; phosphorylation; signal transduction; phosphatidylinositol-mediated signaling
Sources:Amigo / QuickGO
Orthologs
Databases	NCBI: entry; OMA: entry
Species	Human	Mouse
Entrez	5298	107650
Ensembl	ENSG00000143393	ENSMUSG00000038861
UniProt	Q9UBF8	Q8BKC8
RefSeq (mRNA)	NM_001198773; NM_001198774; NM_001198775; NM_002651; NM_001330721 NM_001369623; NM_001369624; NM_001369625; NM_001369626; NM_001369628; NM_001369629	NM_001293715; NM_001293716; NM_175356
RefSeq (protein)	NP_001185702; NP_001185703; NP_001185704; NP_001317650; NP_002642 NP_001356552; NP_001356553; NP_001356554; NP_001356555; NP_001356557; NP_001356558	NP_001280644; NP_001280645; NP_780565
Location (UCSC)	Chr 1: 151.29 – 151.33 Mb	Chr 3: 94.88 – 94.91 Mb
PubMed search
- Wikidata
View/Edit Human	View/Edit Mouse

Phosphatidylinositol 4-kinase beta is an enzyme that in humans is encoded by the PI4KB gene.

== Classification ==
This gene encodes a phosphatidylinositol 4-kinase which catalyzes phosphorylation of phosphatidylinositol at the D-4 position, yielding phosphatidylinositol 4-phosphate (PI4P). Besides the fact, that PI4P serves as a precursor for other important phosphoinositides, such as phosphatidylinositol 4,5-bisphosphate, PI4P is an essential molecule in the cellular signaling and trafficking especially in the Golgi apparatus and the trans Golgi network.

Phosphatidylinositol 4-kinases are evolutionary conserved among eukaryotes and include four human isoforms

- phosphatidylinositol 4-kinase alpha (PI4KA)
- phosphatidylinositol 4-kinase beta (PI4KB)
- phosphatidylinositol 4-kinase 2-alpha (PI4K2A)
- phosphatidylinositol 4-kinase 2-beta (PI4K2B)

== Function ==
Phosphatidylinositol 4-kinase beta (PI4KB) is a soluble protein shuttling between the cytoplasm and the nucleus, and can be recruited to the membranes of the Golgi system via protein-protein interactions, e.g. with small GTP binding proteins Arf1 and Rab11, or a Golgi adaptor protein ACBD3. PI4KB can be phosphorylated by the protein kinase D, which promotes the interaction with 14-3-3 proteins and stabilization of the protein in its active conformation. In cytoplasm PI4KB regulates the trafficking from the Golgi system to the plasma membrane, nevertheless, its nuclear function remains to be determined.

== Clinical significance ==
A wide range of positive-sense single-stranded RNA viruses (e.g. picornaviruses) including many important human pathogens hijack human PI4KB kinase to generate specific PI4P-enriched organelles called membranous webs. These organelles are then used as specific platforms for the effective viral replication within the host cell.

Furthermore, PI4KB homologue from the protozoan parasite Plasmodium falciparum has been identified as a target of imidopyrazines, an antimalarial compound class.

== Structure ==
PI4KB is composed of a proline-rich N-terminal region, a central helical domain, and a kinase domain located C-terminally. The N-terminal region contains a physiologically important binding site for a Golgi adaptor protein ACBD3, but is likely disordered and dispensable for the kinase activity. The central helical domain is responsible for the interaction with a small guanosine triphosphatase Rab11. The kinase domain can be divided into N-terminal and C-terminal lobes with the ATP binding groove and putative phosphatidylinositol binding pocket in a cleft between the lobes. In addition, an ALPS motif has been identified in the extreme C-terminal region of PI4KB, which favors its association with unsaturated or loosely packed membranes regions.

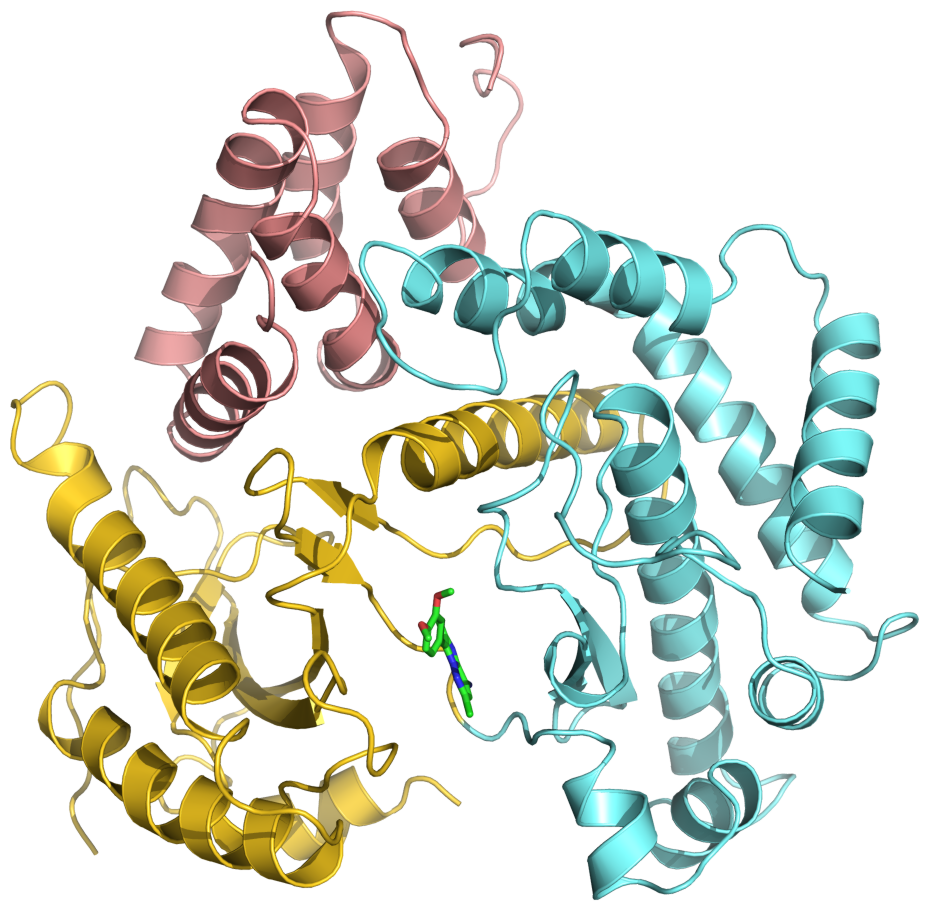
Cartoon representation of the helical and kinase domains of the phosphatidylinositol 4-kinase beta with a nucleoside analogue. Helical domain is colored in salmon, N-lobe of the kinase domain in gold, C-lobe in aquamarine, a specific inhibitor bound in the active site between the lobes in the stick representation. PDB code: 4WAG.
