= PI4K2A =

Protein-coding gene in the species Homo sapiens

Identifiers
- Aliases: PI4K2A, PI4KII, PIK42A, phosphatidylinositol 4-kinase type 2 alpha
- External IDs: OMIM: 609763; MGI: 1934031; GeneCards: PI4K2A
Available structures
PDB	Ortholog search: PDBe RCSB
PDB	List of PDB id codes 4HND, 4HNE, 4PLA, 4YC4, 5EUT, 5I0N
Enzyme activity
EC #	BRENDA	ExPASy	KEGG	MetaCyc
2.7.1.67	↗	↗	↗	↗

Gene location (Human)
Chr.	Chromosome 10 (human)
Band	10q24.2	Start	97,640,686 bp
Band	10q24.2	End	97,676,434 bp

Gene location (Mouse)
Chr.	Chromosome 19 (mouse)
Band	19 C3|19 35.74 cM	Start	42,078,909 bp
Band	19 C3|19 35.74 cM	End	42,110,526 bp
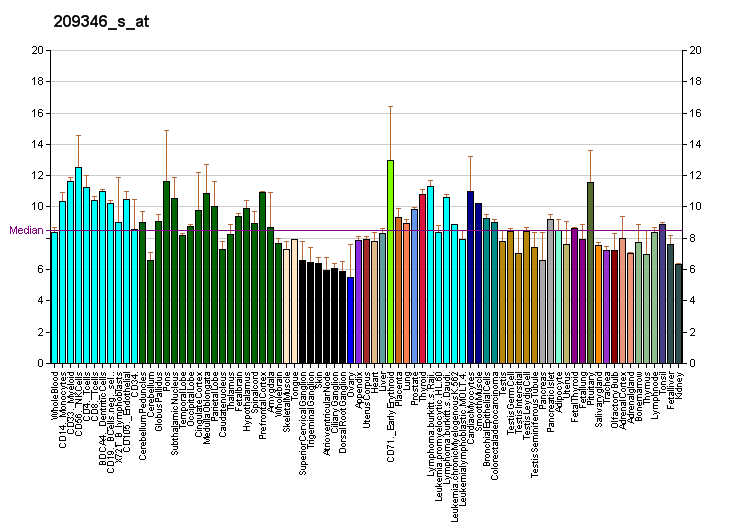

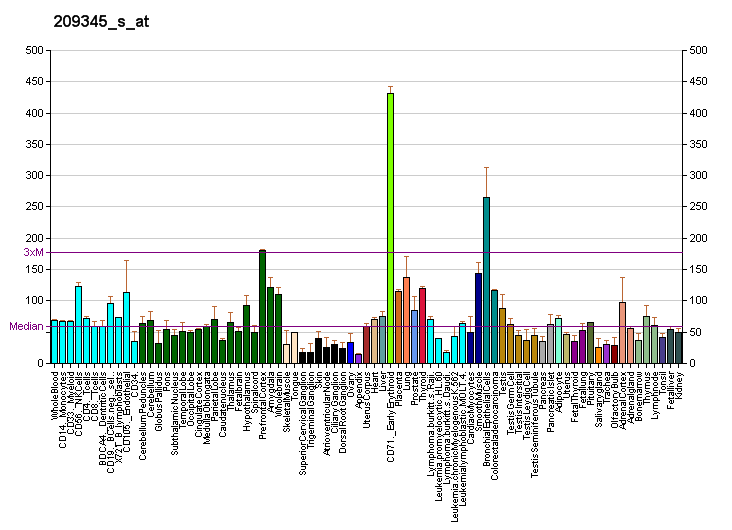

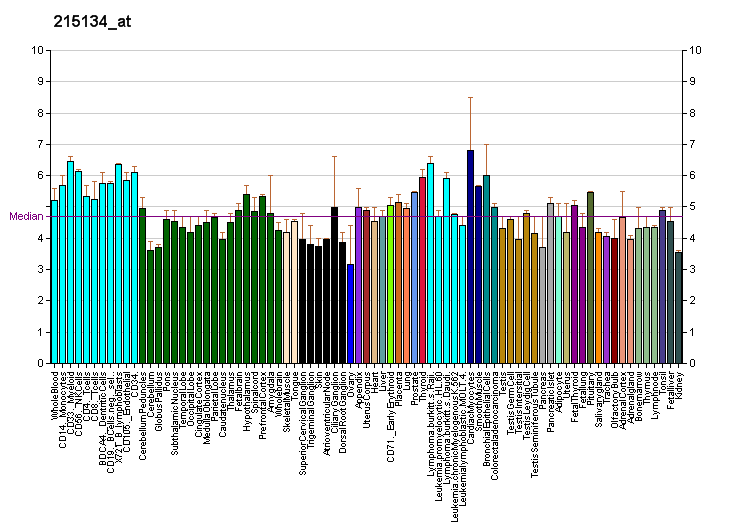
RNA expression pattern
Bgee	Human / Mouse (ortholog); Top expressed in: right adrenal cortex; left adrenal gland; decidua; stromal cell of endometrium; left adrenal cortex; right frontal lobe; retinal pigment epithelium; prefrontal cortex; amniotic fluid; gonad / Top expressed in: pontine nuclei; left lobe of liver; facial motor nucleus; dorsal tegmental nucleus; medulla oblongata; subiculum; right kidney; medial vestibular nucleus; inferior colliculi; deep cerebellar nuclei; More reference expression data
BioGPS	More reference expression data
Gene ontology
Molecular function	transferase activity; nucleotide binding; kinase activity; protein binding; AP-3 adaptor complex binding; ATP binding; magnesium ion binding; 1-phosphatidylinositol 4-kinase activity; protein-containing complex binding
Cellular component	cytosol; Golgi apparatus; cell projection; membrane; BLOC-1 complex; synapse; integral component of plasma membrane; lysosomal membrane; cell junction; dendrite; mitochondrion; neuron projection; intrinsic component of membrane; membrane raft; cytoplasmic vesicle; presynaptic membrane; endosome; trans-Golgi network; plasma membrane; growing cell tip; soma; host cell presynaptic membrane; synaptic vesicle membrane; early endosome membrane; protein-containing complex; perikaryon; intracellular membrane-bounded organelle; exocytic vesicle
Biological process	phosphorylation; phosphatidylinositol biosynthetic process; phosphatidylinositol phosphate biosynthetic process; Golgi organization; endosome organization; basophil degranulation
Sources:Amigo / QuickGO
Orthologs
Databases	NCBI: entry; OMA: entry
Species	Human	Mouse
Entrez	55361	84095
Ensembl	ENSG00000155252	ENSMUSG00000025178
UniProt	Q9BTU6	Q2TBE6
RefSeq (mRNA)	NM_018425	NM_145501
RefSeq (protein)	NP_060895	NP_663476
Location (UCSC)	Chr 10: 97.64 – 97.68 Mb	Chr 19: 42.08 – 42.11 Mb
PubMed search
- Wikidata
View/Edit Human	View/Edit Mouse

Phosphatidylinositol 4-kinase 2-alpha is an enzyme that in humans is encoded by the PI4K2A gene.

== Classification ==
This gene encodes a phosphatidylinositol 4-kinase which catalyzes phosphorylation of phosphatidylinositol at the D-4 position, yielding phosphatidylinositol 4-phosphate (PI4P). Besides the fact, that PI4P serves as a precursor for other important phosphoinositides, such as phosphatidylinositol 4,5-bisphosphate, PI4P is an essential molecule in the cellular signaling and trafficking especially in the Golgi apparatus and the trans Golgi network.

Phosphatidylinositol 4-kinases are evolutionary conserved among eukaryotes and include four human isoforms

- phosphatidylinositol 4-kinase alpha (PI4KA)
- phosphatidylinositol 4-kinase beta (PI4KB)
- phosphatidylinositol 4-kinase 2-alpha (PI4K2A)
- phosphatidylinositol 4-kinase 2-beta (PI4K2B)

== Structure ==
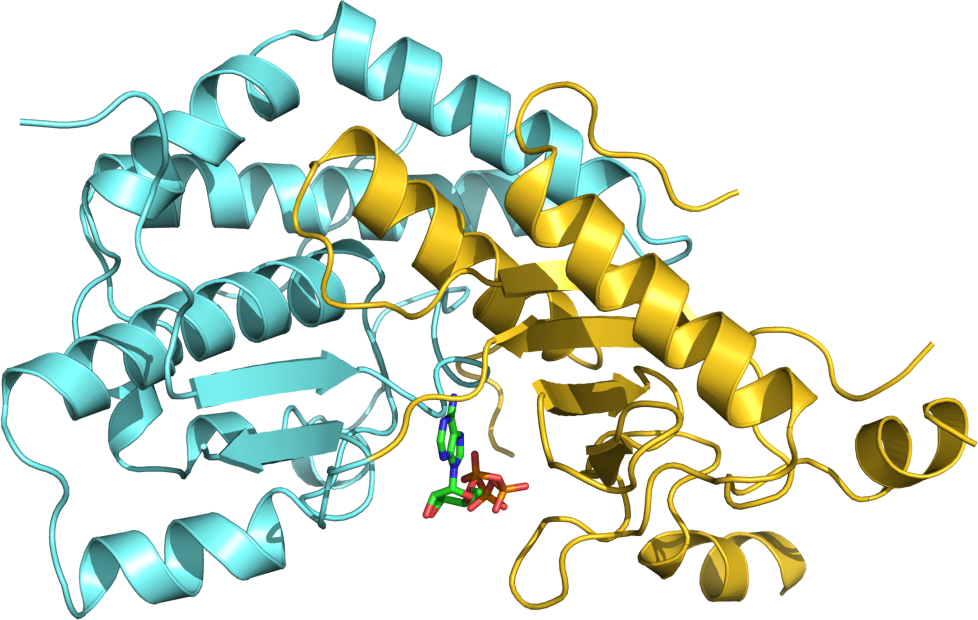
Cartoon representation of the kinase domain of the phosphatidylinositol 4-kinase 2-alpha. N-lobe is colored in gold, C-lobe in aquamarine, ATP in the active site between the lobes in the stick representation. PDB code: 4PLA.

PI4K2A is composed of a proline-rich N-terminal region and a kinase domain located C-terminally. The proline-rich N-terminal region contains physiologically important binding sites for a ubiquitin ligase Itch and clathrin adaptor complex 3, but is likely disordered and dispensable for the kinase activity. The kinase domain can be divided into N-terminal and C-terminal lobes with the ATP binding groove and putative phosphatidylinositol binding pocket in between. The C-lobe of the kinase domain contains an additional lateral hydrophobic pocket with no distinct function assigned yet.

== Function ==
Phosphatidylinositol 4-kinase 2-alpha (PI4K2A) is the most abundant phosphatidylinositol 4-kinase in human cells and is responsible for the synthesis of approximately 50% of the total PI4P within the cell. PI4K2A is associated mainly with the membranes of the trans Golgi network and early and late endosomes; its membrane association is achieved by a heavy palmitoylation within a specific cysteine-rich motif. Besides the synthesis of phosphatidylinositol 4,5-bisphosphate, PI4K2A is involved in various cell processes including membrane trafficking, regulation of endosomal sorting promoting target protein recruitment to endosomes or trans Golgi network, or signal transduction. Particularly, it regulates e.g. targeting of clathrin adaptor complexes to the Golgi apparatus, EGFR signaling, or the Wnt signaling pathway.

PI4K2A is important in lysosomal quality control. It is the first essential enzyme of the phosphoinositide-initiated membrane tethering and lipid transport (PITT) pathway for rapid lysosomal repair. Upon lysosomal membrane damage, PI4K2A is strongly recruited to lysosomes, leading to robust lysosomal PI4P production. Such lysosomal PI4K2A/PI4P signaling drives rapid lysosomal repair through extensive membrane contacts between the endoplasmic reticulum (ER) and damaged lysosomes as well as multiple ER-to-lysosomal lipid transfer processes.

Pi4k2a gene trap mouse show pre-mature aging and neurodegeneration, with increased lipofuscin accumulation. PI4K2A-deleted patients have complex and severe developmental problems along with neurodegeneration.

== Clinical significance ==
Dysfunction of PI4K2A may contribute to tumour growth, spastic paraplegia, Gaucher's disease, or Alzheimer's disease.
