= PIP4K2B =

Protein-coding gene in the species Homo sapiens

Identifiers
- Aliases: PIP4K2B, PI5P4KB, PIP5K2B, PIP5KIIB, PIP5KIIbeta, PIP5P4KB, phosphatidylinositol-5-phosphate 4-kinase type 2 beta
- External IDs: OMIM: 603261; MGI: 1934234; GeneCards: PIP4K2B
Available structures
PDB	Ortholog search: PDBe RCSB
PDB	List of PDB id codes 1BO1, 3WZZ, 3X01, 3X02, 3X03, 3X04, 3X05, 3X06, 3X07, 3X08, 3X09, 3X0A, 3X0B, 3X0C
Enzyme activity
EC #	BRENDA	ExPASy	KEGG	MetaCyc
2.7.1.149	↗	↗	↗	↗

Gene location (Human)
Chr.	Chromosome 17 (human)
Band	17q12	Start	38,765,691 bp
Band	17q12	End	38,800,126 bp

Gene location (Mouse)
Chr.	Chromosome 11 (mouse)
Band	11 D|11 61.07 cM	Start	97,605,983 bp
Band	11 D|11 61.07 cM	End	97,635,530 bp
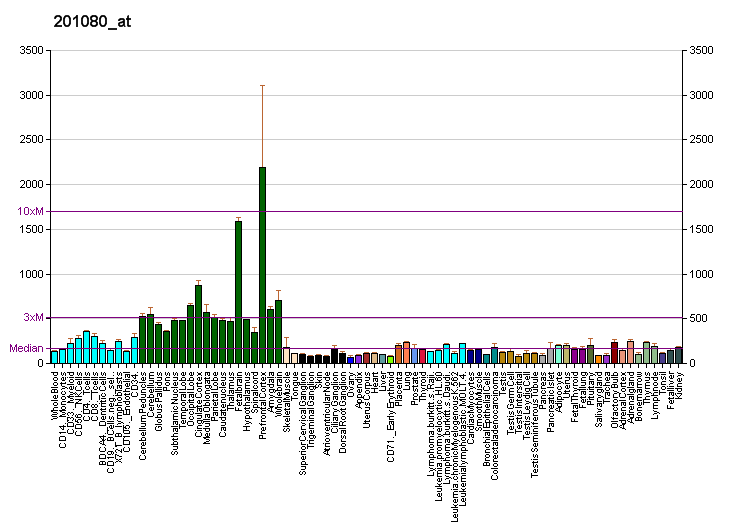

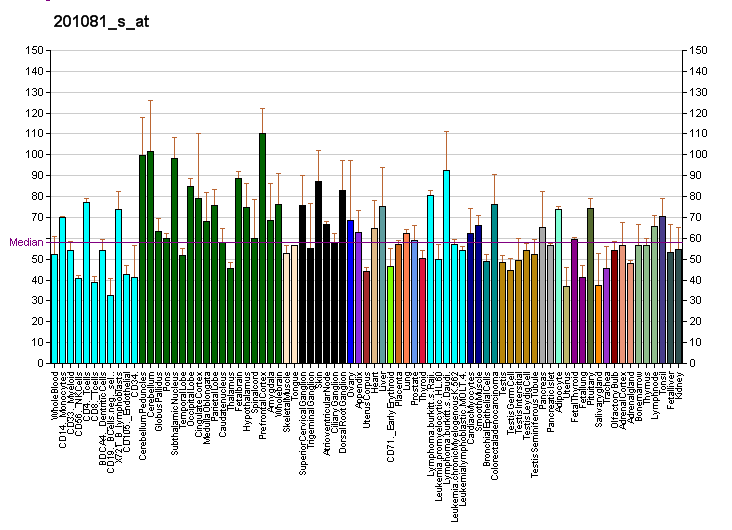
RNA expression pattern
Bgee	Human / Mouse (ortholog); Top expressed in: ganglionic eminence; Brodmann area 9; right frontal lobe; anterior cingulate cortex; prefrontal cortex; ventricular zone; cerebellar hemisphere; right hemisphere of cerebellum; muscle of leg; muscle of thigh / Top expressed in: dentate gyrus of hippocampal formation granule cell; primary visual cortex; muscle of thigh; internal carotid artery; superior frontal gyrus; external carotid artery; hand; gastrocnemius muscle; foot; facial motor nucleus; More reference expression data
BioGPS	More reference expression data
Gene ontology
Molecular function	transferase activity; nucleotide binding; 1-phosphatidylinositol-4-phosphate 5-kinase activity; kinase activity; phosphatidylinositol phosphate kinase activity; protein binding; ATP binding; 1-phosphatidylinositol-3-phosphate 4-kinase activity; 1-phosphatidylinositol-5-phosphate 4-kinase activity; protein homodimerization activity
Cellular component	cytoplasm; cytosol; endoplasmic reticulum membrane; membrane; plasma membrane; autophagosome; endoplasmic reticulum; nucleus; nucleoplasm
Biological process	phosphatidylinositol metabolic process; positive regulation of autophagosome assembly; phosphorylation; cell surface receptor signaling pathway; regulation of autophagy; phosphatidylinositol biosynthetic process; phosphatidylinositol phosphate biosynthetic process; regulation of phosphatidylinositol 3-kinase signaling; phospholipid metabolic process
Sources:Amigo / QuickGO
Orthologs
Databases	NCBI: entry; OMA: entry
Species	Human	Mouse
Entrez	8396	108083
Ensembl	ENSG00000277292; ENSG00000276293	ENSMUSG00000018547
UniProt	P78356	Q80XI4
RefSeq (mRNA)	NM_003559; NM_138687	NM_054051
RefSeq (protein)	NP_003550	NP_473392
Location (UCSC)	Chr 17: 38.77 – 38.8 Mb	Chr 11: 97.61 – 97.64 Mb
PubMed search
- Wikidata
View/Edit Human	View/Edit Mouse

Phosphatidylinositol-5-phosphate 4-kinase type-2 beta is an enzyme that in humans is encoded by the PIP4K2B gene.

The protein encoded by this gene catalyzes the phosphorylation of phosphatidylinositol 4-phosphate on the fifth hydroxyl of the myo-inositol ring to form phosphatidylinositol 4,5-bisphosphate. This gene is a member of the phosphatidylinositol-4-phosphate 5-kinase family. The encoded protein sequence does not show similarity to other kinases, but the protein does exhibit kinase activity. Additionally, the encoded protein interacts with p55 TNF receptor.

== Interactions ==
PIP4K2B has been shown to interact with TNFRSF1A. In addition, PIP4K2B has been shown to interact with PIP4K2A and may modulate the cellular localisation of PIP4K2A.

== Structure ==
The structure of PIP4K2B has been determined through X-ray crystallography.
