= PIP4K2A =

Kinase enzyme

Identifiers
- Aliases: PIP4K2A, PI5P4KA, PIP5K2A, PIP5KII-alpha, PIP5KIIA, PIPK, phosphatidylinositol-5-phosphate 4-kinase type 2 alpha
- External IDs: OMIM: 603140; MGI: 1298206; GeneCards: PIP4K2A
Available structures
| PDB | Ortholog search: PDBe RCSB |
| PDB | List of PDB id codes 2YBX |
Enzyme activity
| EC # | BRENDA | ExPASy | KEGG | MetaCyc |
|---|---|---|---|---|
| 2.7.1.149 | ↗ | ↗ | ↗ | ↗ |

Gene location (Human)
| Chr. | Chromosome 10 (human) |
| Band | 10p12.2 | Start | 22,534,854 bp |
| Band | 10p12.2 | End | 22,714,578 bp |

Gene location (Mouse)
| Chr. | Chromosome 2 (mouse) |
| Band | 2|2 A3 | Start | 18,847,066 bp |
| Band | 2|2 A3 | End | 19,002,937 bp |
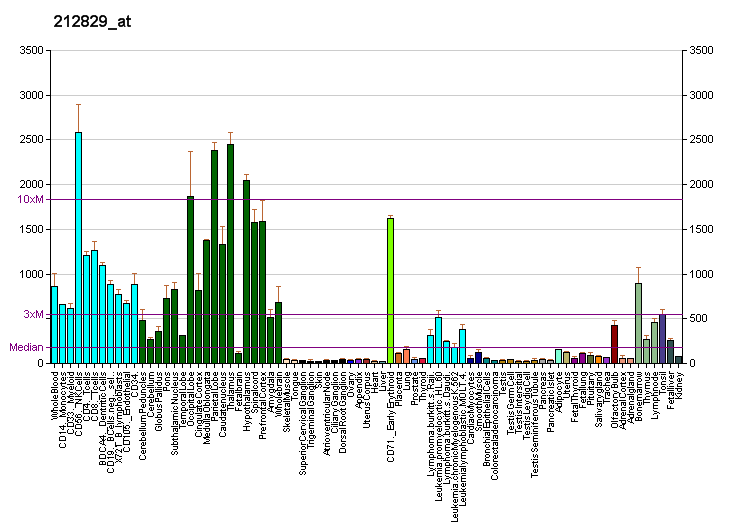

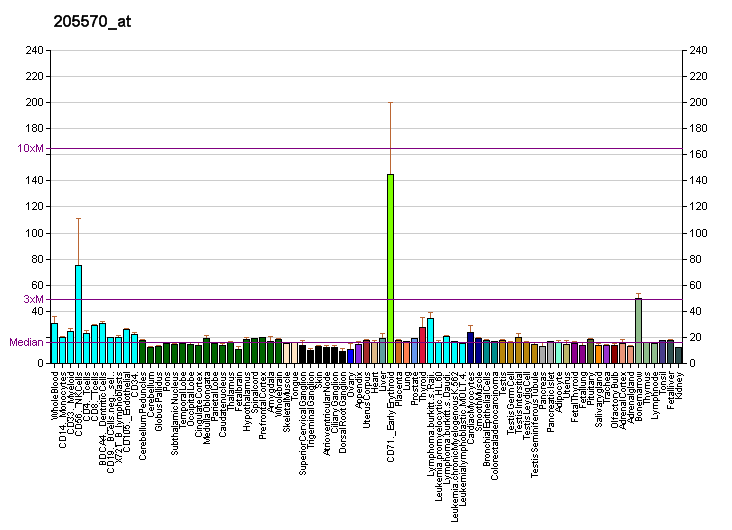
RNA expression pattern
| Bgee | Human / Mouse (ortholog); Top expressed in: inferior olivary nucleus; internal globus pallidus; inferior ganglion of vagus nerve; external globus pallidus; corpus callosum; pars reticulata; C1 segment; dorsal motor nucleus of vagus nerve; subthalamic nucleus; Region I of hippocampus proper / Top expressed in: deep cerebellar nuclei; anterior horn of spinal cord; blood; facial motor nucleus; pontine nuclei; thymus; substantia nigra; globus pallidus; spleen; medial vestibular nucleus; More reference expression data |
| BioGPS | More reference expression data |
Gene ontology
| Molecular function | transferase activity; nucleotide binding; 1-phosphatidylinositol-4-phosphate 5-kinase activity; kinase activity; phosphatidylinositol phosphate kinase activity; ATP binding; 1-phosphatidylinositol-3-phosphate 4-kinase activity; 1-phosphatidylinositol-5-phosphate 4-kinase activity; protein binding |
| Cellular component | cytoplasm; cytosol; membrane; plasma membrane; autophagosome; nucleus; nucleoplasm |
| Biological process | megakaryocyte development; phosphatidylinositol metabolic process; positive regulation of autophagosome assembly; phosphorylation; regulation of autophagy; phosphatidylinositol biosynthetic process; phosphatidylinositol phosphate biosynthetic process; regulation of phosphatidylinositol 3-kinase signaling; phospholipid metabolic process |
Sources:Amigo / QuickGO
Orthologs
| Databases | NCBI: entry; OMA: entry |
| Species | Human | Mouse |
| Entrez | 5305 | 18718 |
| Ensembl | ENSG00000150867 | ENSMUSG00000026737 |
| UniProt | P48426 | O70172 |
| RefSeq (mRNA) | NM_005028; NM_001330062 | NM_008845; NM_001355146; NM_001355147; NM_001355148; NM_001355149 |
| RefSeq (protein) | NP_001316991; NP_005019 | NP_032871; NP_001342075; NP_001342076; NP_001342077; NP_001342078 |
| Location (UCSC) | Chr 10: 22.53 – 22.71 Mb | Chr 2: 18.85 – 19 Mb |
| PubMed search |
- Wikidata
| View/Edit Human | View/Edit Mouse |

Phosphatidylinositol-5-phosphate 4-kinase type-2 alpha is an enzyme that in humans is encoded by the PIP4K2A gene.

== Function ==
Phosphatidylinositol-4,5-bisphosphate, the precursor to second messengers of the phosphoinositide signal transduction pathways, is thought to be involved in the regulation of secretion, cell proliferation, differentiation, and motility. The protein encoded by this gene is one of a family of enzymes capable of catalyzing the phosphorylation of phosphatidylinositol-4-phosphate on the fifth hydroxyl of the myo-inositol ring to form phosphatidylinositol-4,5-bisphosphate.

The amino acid sequence of this enzyme does not show homology to other kinases, but the recombinant protein does exhibit kinase activity. This gene is a member of the phosphatidylinositol-4-phosphate 5-kinase family.

== Clinical significance ==
Through genome wide association studies (GWAS), some of the single nucleotide polymorphisms (SNPs) located in this gene have been noticed to be significantly associated with susceptibility of childhood acute lymphoblastic leukaemia in ethnically diverse populations.

== PIP4K2A Inhibitors ==
THZ-P1-2 (covalent inhibitor) as well as BAY-091 and BAY-297 (reversible inhibitors) have been reported as potent and selective PIP4K2A inhibitors. BAY-091 fulfills the quality criteria for a 'Donated Chemical Probe' as defined by the Structural Genomics Consortium.
