= Phosphatidylinositol-4-phosphate 5-kinase =

Class of kinase enzymes

phosphatidylinositol-4-phosphate 5-kinase

Identifiers
- EC no.: 2.7.1.68

Databases
- BRENDA: enzyme data
- ExPASy: NiceZyme view
- KEGG: enzyme entry
- MetaCyc: metabolic pathway
- Rhea: reactions
- PDB structures: RCSB PDB PDBe PDBsum
- Gene Ontology: AmiGO / QuickGO
Search
- PMC: articles
- PubMed: articles
- NCBI: proteins

Phosphatidylinositol-4-phosphate 5-kinases (PIP5Ks, or PI4P5Ks) are a class of enzymes that phosphorylate phosphatidylinositol 4-phosphate. They perform this reaction on the fifth hydroxyl of the myo-inositol ring to form phosphatidylinositol 4,5-bisphosphate.

== Function ==
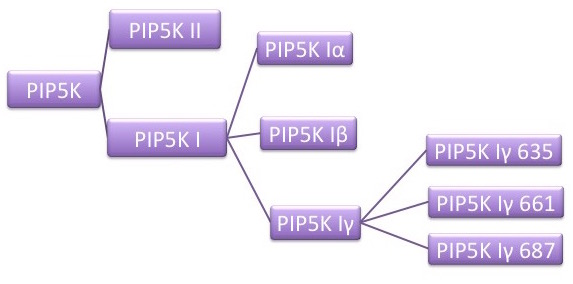
Different types of PIP5 kinases and their subtypes

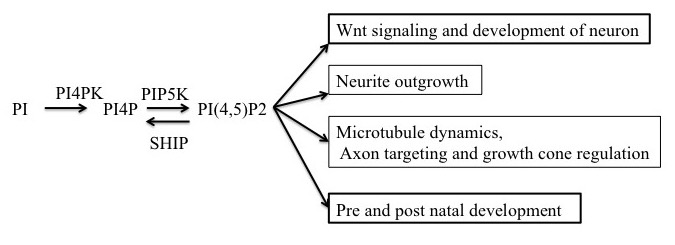
Role of PIP5K and PI(4,5)P2 in neuronal development PI(4,5)P2 is produced in different compartments of the cell from PI4P by PIP5 kinase. PIP5K and PI(4,5)P2 play important roles in neuronal development.

Phosphatidylinositol 4-Phosphate-5 kinase (PI4P5K) or PIP5K or PI5K family regulates diverse cellular processes such as G protein-coupled receptor(GPCR) signaling, vesicle trafficking, chemotaxis and cellular movement. There are at least two types of PIP5K found which includes Type I and Type II. Reinvestigation of the substrate specificity of PI(4)P5Ks, however, revealed that the type II PI(4)P5Ks catalyze phosphorylation of a novel phosphoinositide phosphati- dylinositol 5-phosphate at the D-4 position of the inositol ring, leading to the revised conclusion that the type II enzymes are actually phosphatidylinositol 5-phosphate 4-kinases. Thus, the PI(4)P5K family now comprises just the type I􏰂.Other types are also suspected in the nervous system but have not been well reported. These enzymes synthesize diverse Phosphatidyl Inositol 4,5 bisphosphate ( PI(4,5)P2 ) by phosphorylating the D- 5 position of the inositol ring of Phosphatidylinositol 4-phosphate]. PIP5KI is the most extensively studied and is synthesizing for most of the PI(4,5)P2 pool the cell.

Type I phosphatidylinositol-4-phosphate 5-kinase (PIP5KI) are further classified as PIP5Kα, PIP5Kβ and PIP5Kγ on the basis of their basic differences in primary structure and the variation in the expression level in different compartment of cells, indicating that individual PIP5KI isoform has non identical function [5]. Moreover, PIP5Kγ, has three splicing variance; PIP5Kγ635, PIP5γ661, and PIP5Kγ687, making it one of the key regulators for producing PI(4,5)P2 that plays a role in diverse cellular processes.

Although an extensive study to elucidate the role of PI(4,5)P2 and PIP5 kinase has been focused on many cellular processes such as vesicle trafficking, cell movement and cytoskeletal assembly, a very few studies have been reported for their role in neuronal development. PIP5K is highly expressed kinase in the nervous system of several organisms and plays important role in neuronal development including embryogenesis and post-natal neural development. The disruption of PIP5KIγ leads to broad developmental and cellular defects in mice indicating PIP5KIγ plays critical role for embryogenesis and adulthood of mice and its disruption causes fatality for postnatal life []. The embryo without PIP5KIγ has extensive prenatal lethality during embryonic development. The disruption of PIP5KIγ also causes neural tube closure defects caused by decreased PI(4,5)P2 level. In contrast to this, mice lacking PIPKIα or PIPKIβ have major impact during adulthood but no effect in prenatal embryo, Even in the absence of both PIPKIα and PIPKIβ, a single allele of PIPKIγ, can support normal the adulthood functioning, indicating PIPKIγ and PIPKIα have partially overlapping function during embryogenesis. In different experiments, the role of PIP5K in neurite outgrowth has been analyzed by knocking down PIP5Kα. The Nerve Growth Factor (NGF) induced neurite outgrowth was more obvious in knock down cells than in control cells. In contrary, the over-expression of PIP5Ka in to a PIP5Ka Knock down cells abrogated neurite outgrowth showing PIP5K acts as a negative regulator of NGF-induced neurite outgrowth through inhibiting the PI3K/ AKT signaling pathway in PC12 cells.

A novel mechanism for the role of PIPKIα in regulating neuronal morphology by controlling microtubule dynamics is reported in mouse. During axon pathfinding, a growth cone is formed to guide the migrating axon. Growth cone formation is induced by Kinesin Supar Family protein 2A (KIF2A) KIF2A- mediated depolymerization of microtubules. The interaction of PIPKα with KIF2A suppresses the elongation of axon branches.

In association with Daam2, PIP5 kinase promotes Wnt signaling and receptor complex formation which is required for the regenerative myelination of the neuron. In the central nervous system (CNS) of chick, PIP5K-PI(4,5)P2 mediated role of Daam2 has been reported for the development of neurons.

== List of PIP4Ks ==
- Phosphatidylinositol-5-phosphate 4-kinase type-2 alpha (PIP4K2A)
- Phosphatidylinositol-5-phosphate 4-kinase type-2 beta (PIP4K2B)
- Phosphatidylinositol-5-phosphate 4-kinase type-2 gamma (PIP4K2C)
