= Visual phototransduction =

Process by which light activates retinal cells

Visual phototransduction is the sensory transduction process of the visual system by which light is detected by photoreceptor cells (rods and cones) in the vertebrate retina. A photon is absorbed by a retinal chromophore (each bound to an opsin), which initiates a signal cascade through several intermediate cells, then through the retinal ganglion cells (RGCs) comprising the optic nerve.

== Overview ==
Light enters the eye, passes through the optical media, then the inner neural layers of the retina before finally reaching the photoreceptor cells in the outer layer of the retina. The light may be absorbed by a chromophore bound to an opsin, which photoisomerizes the chromophore, initiating both the visual cycle, which "resets" the chromophore, and the phototransduction cascade, which transmits the visual signal to the brain. The cascade begins with graded polarization (an analog signal) of the excited photoreceptor cell, as its membrane potential increases from a resting potential of −70 mV, proportional to the light intensity. At rest, the photoreceptor cells are continually releasing glutamate at the synaptic terminal to maintain the potential. The transmitter release rate is lowered (hyperpolarization) as light intensity increases. Each synaptic terminal makes up to 500 contacts with horizontal cells and bipolar cells. These intermediate cells (along with amacrine cells) perform comparisons of photoreceptor signals within a receptive field, but their precise functionalities are not well understood. The signal remains as a graded polarization in all cells until it reaches the RGCs, where it is converted to an action potential and transmitted to the brain.

== Photoreceptors ==
The photoreceptor cells involved in vertebrate vision are the rods, the cones, and the photosensitive ganglion cells (ipRGCs). These cells contain a chromophore (11-cis-retinal, the aldehyde of vitamin A1 and light-absorbing portion) that is bound to a cell membrane protein, opsin. Rods are responsible for vision under low light intensity and contrast detections. Because they all have the same response across frequencies, no colour information can be deduced from the rods only, as in low light conditions for example. Cones, on the other hand, are of different kinds with different frequency response, such that colour can be perceived through comparison of the outputs of different kinds of cones. Each cone type responds best to certain wavelengths, or colours, of light because each type has a slightly different opsin. The three types of cones are L-cones, M-cones and S-cones that respond optimally to long wavelengths (reddish colour), medium wavelengths (greenish colour), and short wavelengths (bluish colour) respectively. Humans have trichromatic photopic vision consisting of three opponent process channels that enable colour vision. Rod photoreceptors are the most common cell type in the retina and develop quite late. Most cells become postmitotic before birth, but differentiation occurs after birth. In the first week after birth, cells mature and the eye becomes fully functional at the time of opening. The visual pigment rhodopsin (rho) is the first known sign of differentiation in rods.

== Transduction process ==
To understand the photoreceptor's behaviour to light intensities, it is necessary to understand the roles of different currents.

There is an ongoing outward potassium current through nongated K^{+}-selective channels. This outward current tends to hyperpolarize the photoreceptor at around −70 mV (the equilibrium potential for K^{+}).

There is also an inward sodium current carried by cGMP-gated sodium channels. This "dark current" depolarizes the cell to around −40 mV. This is significantly more depolarized than most other neurons.

A high density of Na^{+}-K^{+} pumps enables the photoreceptor to maintain a steady intracellular concentration of Na^{+} and K^{+}.

When light intensity increases, the potential of the membrane decreases (hyperpolarization). Because as the intensity increases, the release of the stimulating neurotransmitter glutamate of the photoreceptors is reduced. When light intensity decreases, that is, in the dark environment, glutamate release by photoreceptors increases. This increases the membrane potential and produces membrane depolarization.

=== In the dark ===
Photoreceptor cells are unusual cells in that they depolarize in response to absence of stimuli or scotopic conditions (darkness). In photopic conditions (light), photoreceptors hyperpolarize to a potential of −60 mV.

In the dark, cGMP levels are high and keep cGMP-gated sodium channels open allowing a steady inward current, called the dark current. This dark current keeps the cell depolarized at about −40 mV, leading to glutamate release which inhibits excitation of neurons.

The depolarization of the cell membrane in scotopic conditions opens voltage-gated calcium channels. An increased intracellular concentration of Ca^{2+} causes vesicles containing glutamate, a neurotransmitter, to merge with the cell membrane, therefore releasing glutamate into the synaptic cleft, an area between the end of one cell and the beginning of another neuron. Glutamate, though usually excitatory, functions here as an inhibitory neurotransmitter.

In the cone pathway, glutamate:

- Depolarizes on-centre bipolar cells. Glutamate that is released from the photoreceptors in the dark binds to metabotropic glutamate receptors (mGluR6), which, through a G-protein coupling mechanism, causing depolarization of the bipolar cell.
- Hyperpolarizes off-centre bipolar cells. Binding of glutamate to ionotropic glutamate receptors results in hyperpolarization of the bipolar cell.

=== In the light ===
In summary: Light closes cGMP-gated sodium channels, reducing the influx of both Na^{+} and Ca^{2+} ions. Stopping the influx of Na^{+} ions effectively switches off the dark current. Reducing this dark current causes the photoreceptor to hyperpolarise, which reduces glutamate release which thus reduces the inhibition of retinal nerves, leading to excitation of these nerves. This reduced Ca^{2+} influx during phototransduction enables deactivation and recovery from phototransduction, as discussed below in § Deactivation of the phototransduction cascade.

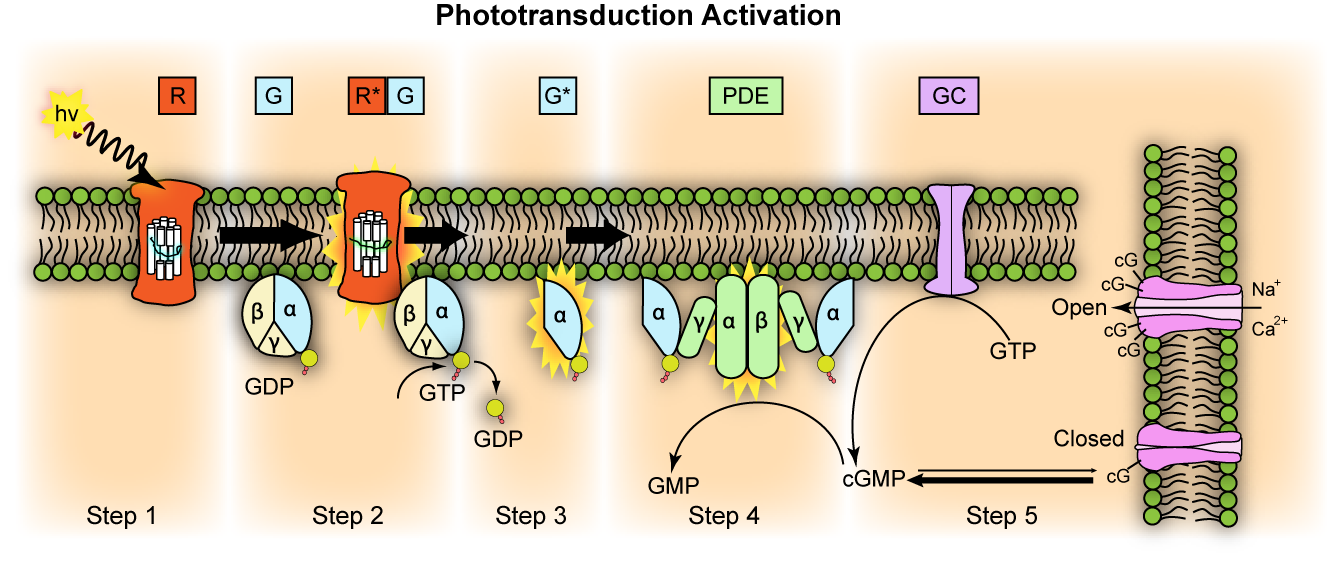
Representation of molecular steps in photoactivation (modified from Leskov et al., 2000). Depicted is a rod outer segment disk membrane; the region depicted above the membrane is in the disk lumen, the region below is the cytosol. Step 1: Incident photon (hν) is absorbed and activates a rhodopsin (likewise photopsin) by conformational change in the disk membrane to R*. Step 2: Next, R* makes repeated contacts with transducin molecules, catalysing its activation to G* by the release of bound GDP in exchange for cytoplasmic GTP, which expels its β and γ subunits. Step 3: G* binds inhibitory γ subunits of the phosphodiesterase (PDE), activating its α and β subunits. Step 4: Activated PDE hydrolyses cGMP. Step 5: Guanylyl cyclase (GC) synthesizes cGMP, the second messenger in the phototransduction cascade. Reduced levels of cytosolic cGMP cause cyclic nucleotide-gated channels to close, preventing further influx of Na^{+} and Ca^{2+}.

1. A photon interacts with a retinal molecule in an opsin complex in a photoreceptor cell. The retinal undergoes isomerization, changing from the 11-cis-retinal to the all-trans-retinal configuration.
2. Opsin therefore undergoes a conformational change to metarhodopsin II.
3. Metarhodopsin II activates a G protein known as transducin. This causes transducin to dissociate from its bound GDP, and bind GTP; then the alpha subunit of transducin dissociates from the beta and gamma subunits, with the GTP still bound to the alpha subunit.
4. The alpha subunit-GTP complex activates phosphodiesterase, also known as PDE6. It binds to one of two regulatory subunits of PDE (which itself is a tetramer) and stimulates its activity.
5. PDE hydrolyses cGMP, forming GMP. This lowers the intracellular concentration of cGMP and therefore the sodium channels close.
6. Closure of the sodium channels causes hyperpolarization of the cell due to the ongoing efflux of potassium ions.
7. Hyperpolarization of the cell causes voltage-gated calcium channels to close.
8. As the calcium level in the photoreceptor cell drops, the amount of the neurotransmitter glutamate that is released by the cell also drops. This is because calcium is required for the glutamate-containing vesicles to fuse with cell membrane and release their contents (see SNARE proteins).
9. A decrease in the amount of glutamate released by the photoreceptors causes depolarization of on-centre bipolar cells (rod and cone On bipolar cells) and hyperpolarization of cone off-centre bipolar cells.

=== Deactivation of the phototransduction cascade ===
In light, low cGMP levels close Na^{+} and Ca^{2+} channels, reducing intracellular Na^{+} and Ca^{2+}. During recovery (dark adaptation), the low Ca^{2+} levels induce recovery (termination of the phototransduction cascade), as follows:

1. Low intracellular Ca^{2+} causes Ca^{2+} to dissociate from guanylate cyclase activating protein (GCAP). The liberated GCAP ultimately restores depleted cGMP levels, which re-opens the cGMP-gated cation channels (restoring dark current).
2. Low intracellular Ca^{2+} causes Ca^{2+} to dissociate from GTPase-activating protein (GAP), also known as regulator of G protein signalling. The liberated GAP deactivates transducin, terminating the phototransduction cascade (restoring dark current).
3. Low intracellular Ca^{2+} makes intracellular Ca-recoverin-RK dissociate into Ca^{2+} and recoverin and rhodopsin kinase (RK). The liberated RK then phosphorylates the Metarhodopsin II, reducing its binding affinity for transducin. Arrestin then completely deactivates the phosphorylated-metarhodopsin II, terminating the phototransduction cascade (restoring dark current).
4. Low intracellular Ca^{2+} make the Ca^{2+}/calmodulin complex within the cGMP-gated cation channels more sensitive to low cGMP levels (thereby, keeping the cGMP-gated cation channel open even at low cGMP levels, restoring dark current)

In more detail:

GTPase Accelerating Protein (GAP) of RGS (regulators of G protein signalling) interacts with the alpha subunit of transducin, and causes it to hydrolyse its bound GTP to GDP, and thus halts the action of phosphodiesterase, stopping the transformation of cGMP to GMP. This deactivation step of the phototransduction cascade (the deactivation of the G protein transducer) was found to be the rate limiting step in the deactivation of the phototransduction cascade.

In other words: Guanylate Cyclase Activating Protein (GCAP) is a calcium binding protein, and as the calcium levels in the cell have decreased, GCAP dissociates from its bound calcium ions, and interacts with Guanylate Cyclase, activating it. Guanylate Cyclase then proceeds to transform GTP to cGMP, replenishing the cell's cGMP levels and thus reopening the sodium channels that were closed during phototransduction.

Finally, Metarhodopsin II is deactivated. Recoverin, another calcium binding protein, is normally bound to Rhodopsin Kinase when calcium is present. When the calcium levels fall during phototransduction, the calcium dissociates from recoverin, and rhodopsin kinase is released and phosphorylates metarhodopsin II, which decreases its affinity for transducin. Finally, arrestin, another protein, binds the phosphorylated metarhodopsin II, completely deactivating it. Thus, finally, phototransduction is deactivated, and the dark current and glutamate release is restored. It is this pathway, where Metarhodopsin II is phosphorylated and bound to arrestin and thus deactivated, which is thought to be responsible for the S2 component of dark adaptation. The S2 component represents a linear section of the dark adaptation function present at the beginning of dark adaptation for all bleaching intensities.

== Visual cycle ==
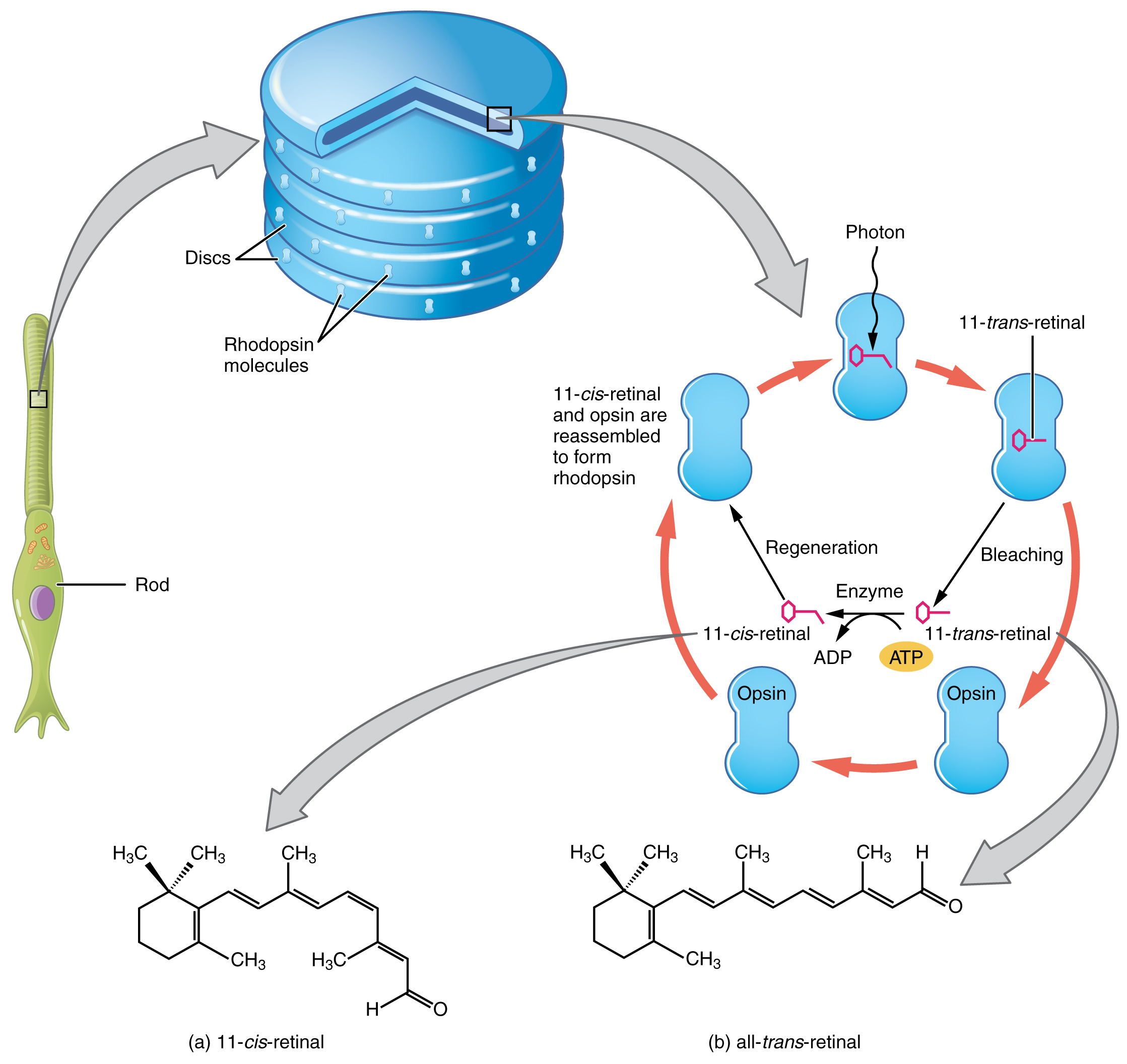
The absorption of light leads to an isomeric change in the retinal molecule.

The visual cycle occurs via G-protein coupled receptors called retinylidene proteins which consists of a visual opsin and a chromophore 11-cis-retinal. The 11-cis-retinal is covalently linked to the opsin receptor via Schiff base. When it absorbs a photon, 11-cis-retinal undergoes photoisomerization to all-trans-retinal, which changes the conformation of the opsin GPCR leading to signal transduction cascades which causes closure of cyclic GMP-gated cation channel, and hyperpolarization of the photoreceptor cell. Following photoisomerization, all-trans-retinal is released from the opsin protein and reduced to all-trans-retinol, which travels to the retinal pigment epithelium to be "recharged". It is first esterified by lecithin retinol acyltransferase (LRAT) and then converted to 11-cis-retinol by the isomerohydrolase RPE65. The isomerase activity of RPE65 has been shown; it is uncertain whether it also acts as the hydrolase. Finally, it is oxidized to 11-cis-retinal before travelling back to the photoreceptor cell outer segment where it is again conjugated to an opsin to form new, functional visual pigment (retinylidene protein), namely photopsin or rhodopsin.

== In invertebrates ==
Visual phototransduction in invertebrates like the fruit fly differs from that of vertebrates, described up to now. The primary basis of invertebrate phototransduction is the PI(4,5)P_{2} cycle. Here, light induces the conformational change into rhodopsin and converts it into meta-rhodopsin. This helps in dissociation of G-protein complex. Alpha sub-unit of this complex activates the PLC enzyme (PLC-beta) which hydrolyse the PIP2 into DAG. This hydrolysis leads to opening of TRP channels and influx of calcium.

Invertebrate photoreceptor cells differ morphologically and physiologically from their vertebrate counterparts. Visual stimulation in vertebrates causes a hyperpolarization (weakening) of the photoreceptor membrane potential, whereas invertebrates experience a depolarization with light intensity. Single-photon events produced under identical conditions in invertebrates differ from vertebrates in time course and size. Likewise, multi-photon events are longer than single-photon responses in invertebrates. However, in vertebrates, the multi-photon response is similar to the single-photon response. Both phyla have light adaptation and single-photon events are smaller and faster. Calcium plays an important role in this adaptation. Light adaptation in vertebrates is primarily attributable to calcium feedback, but in invertebrates cyclic AMP is another control on dark adaptation.

=== Opsins and spectral sensitivity ===
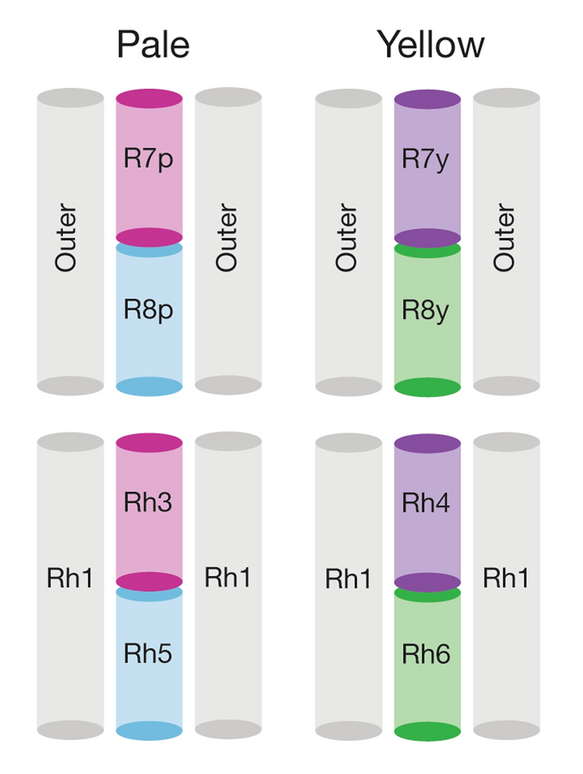
The arrangement of the photoreceptor cells in a pale and yellow ommatidia of Drosophila melanogaster: The top row shows two of the six outer photoreceptor cells (R1-R6) and the inner R7 and R8 cells. The bottom row shows the different opsins (Rh1, Rh3, Rh4, Rh5, and Rh6) the cells express. Figure from Sharkey et al. (2020).

Expression of the opsin Rh1 in the photoreceptor cells R1-R6

The genome of Drosophila encodes seven opsins, five of those are expressed in the omatidia of the eye. The photoreceptor cells R1-R6 express the opsin Rh1, which absorbs maximally blue light (around 480 nm), however the R1-R6 cells cover a broader range of the spectrum than an opsin would allow due to a sensitising pigment that adds two sensitivity maxima in the UV-range (355 and 370 nm). The R7 cells come in two types with yellow and pale rhabdomeres (R7y and R7p). The pale R7p cells express the opsin Rh3, which maximally absorbs UV-light (345 nm). The R7p cells are strictly paired with the R8p cells that express Rh5, which maximally absorbs violet light (437 nm). The other, the yellow R7y cells express a blue-absorbing screening pigment and the opsin Rh4, which maximally absorbs UV-light (375 nm). The R7y cells are strictly paired with R8y cells that express Rh6, which maximally absorbs blue-green light (508 nm). In a subset of omatidia both R7 and R8 cells express the opsin Rh3.

However, these absorption maxima of the opsins where measured in white eyed flies without screening pigments (Rh3-Rh6), or from the isolated opsin directly (Rh1). Those pigments reduce the light that reaches the opsins depending on the wavelength. Thus in fully pigmented flies, the effective absorption maxima of opsins differs and thus also the sensitivity of their photoreceptor cells. With screening pigment, the opsin Rh3 is short wave shifted from 345 nm (Note: Sharkey et al. give the absorption maximum of Rh3 as 334 nm in their result section. However, in the introduction and the material and methods section they give it as 345 nm. For both values, they cite Feiler et al., who reported 345 nm only. Therefore, this seems to be a mistake and they probably meant there 345 nm, too.) to 330 nm and Rh4 from 375 nm to 355 nm. Whether screening pigment is present does not make a practical difference for the opsin Rh5 (435 nm and 437 nm), while the opsin R6 is long wave shifted by 92 nm from 508 nm to 600 nm.

Additionally of the opsins of the eye, Drosophila has two more opsins: The ocelli express the opsin Rh2, which maximally absorbs violet light (~420 nm). And the opsin Rh7, which maximally absorbs UV-light (350 nm) with an unusually long wavelength tail up to 500 nm. The long tail disappears if a lysine at position 90 is replaced by glutamic acid. This mutant then absorbs maximally violet light (450 nm). The opsin Rh7 entrains with cryptochrome the circadian rhythm of Drosophila to the day-night-cycle in the central pacemaker neurons.

Each Drosophila opsin binds the carotenoid chromophore 11-cis-3-hydroxyretinal via a lysine. This lysine is conserved in almost all opsins, only a few opsins have lost it during evolution. Opsins without it are not light sensitive. In particular, the Drosophila opsins Rh1, Rh4, and Rh7 function not only as photoreceptors, but also as chemoreceptors for aristolochic acid. These opsins still have the lysine like other opsins. However, if it is replaced by an arginine in Rh1, then Rh1 loses light sensitivity but still responds to aristolochic acid. Thus, the lysine is not needed for Rh1 to function as chemoreceptor.

Spectral sensitivities of Drosophila melanogaster opsins in photoreceptor cells of white and red eyed flies
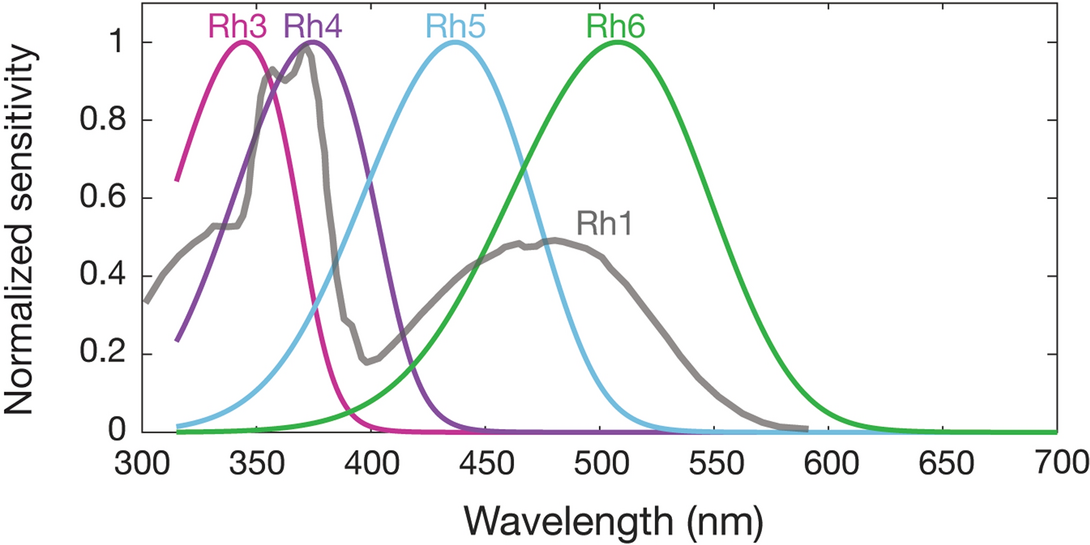
Spectral sensitivities of Drosophila melanogaster opsins in white eyed flies. The sensitivities of Rh3–R6 are modelled with opsin templates and sensitivity estimates from Salcedo et al. (1999). The opsin Rh1 (redrawn from Salcedo et al.) has a characteristic shape as it is coupled to a UV-sensitising pigment.

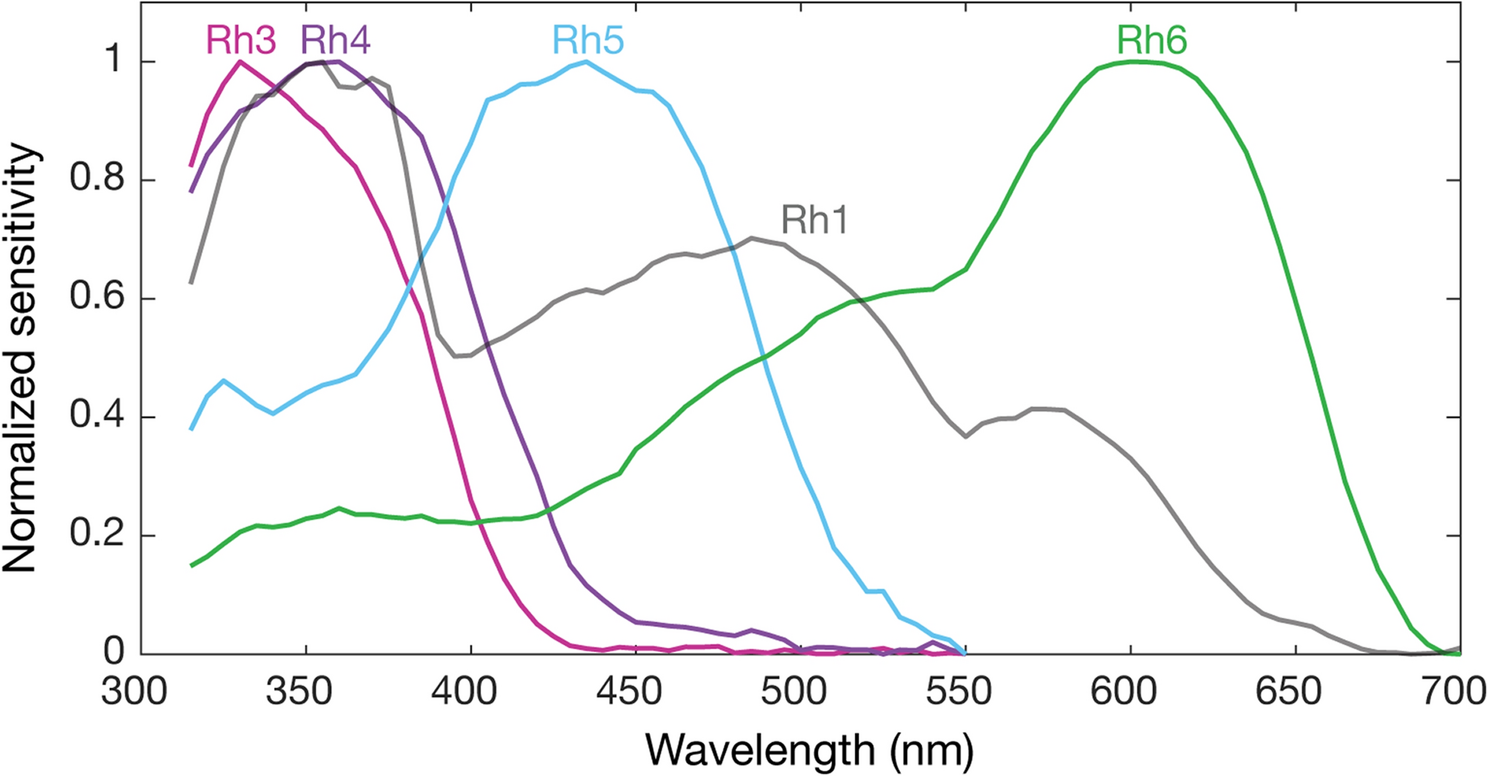
Normalized mean spectral sensitivity curves of Drosophila melanogaster opsins Rh1, Rh3, Rh4, Rh5, and Rh6 measured in their native photoreceptor cells in red eye flies with screening pigment. Each spectral curve is the average from six flies.

=== Phototransduction ===
As in vertebrate vision, visual transduction in invertebrates occurs via a G protein-coupled pathway. However, in vertebrates, the G protein is transducin, while the G protein in invertebrates is Gq (dgq in Drosophila). When rhodopsin (Rh) absorbs a photon of light its chromophore, 11-cis-3-hydroxyretinal, is isomerized to all-trans-3-hydroxyretinal. Rh undergoes a conformational change into its active form, metarhodopsin. Metarhodopsin activates Gq, which in turn activates a phospholipase Cβ (PLCβ) known as NorpA.

PLCβ hydrolyses phosphatidylinositol (4,5)-bisphosphate (PIP_{2}), a phospholipid found in the cell membrane, into soluble inositol triphosphate (IP_{3}) and diacylglycerol (DAG), which stays in the cell membrane. DAG, a derivative of DAG, or PIP_{2} depletion cause a calcium-selective ion channel known as transient receptor potential (TRP) to open and calcium and sodium flows into the cell. IP_{3} is thought to bind to IP_{3} receptors in the subrhabdomeric cisternae, an extension of the endoplasmic reticulum, and cause release of calcium, but this process does not seem to be essential for normal vision.

Calcium binds to proteins such as calmodulin (CaM) and an eye-specific protein kinase C (PKC) known as InaC. These proteins interact with other proteins and have been shown to be necessary for shut off of the light response. In addition, proteins called arrestins bind metarhodopsin and prevent it from activating more Gq. A sodium-calcium exchanger known as CalX pumps the calcium out of the cell. It uses the inward sodium gradient to export calcium at a stoichiometry of 3 Na^{+}/ 1 Ca^{++}.

TRP, InaC, and PLC form a signalling complex by binding a scaffolding protein called InaD. InaD contains five binding domains called PDZ domain proteins, which specifically bind the C termini of target proteins. Disruption of the complex by mutations in either the PDZ domains or the target proteins reduces the efficiency of signalling. For example, disruption of the interaction between InaC, the protein kinase C, and InaD results in a delay in inactivation of the light response.

Unlike vertebrate metarhodopsin, invertebrate metarhodopsin can be converted back into rhodopsin by absorbing a photon of orange light (580 nm).
