= INPP4A =

Protein-coding gene in the species Homo sapiens

Identifiers
- Aliases: INPP4A, INPP4, TVAS1, inositol polyphosphate-4-phosphatase type I A
- External IDs: OMIM: 600916; MGI: 1931123; GeneCards: INPP4A
Enzyme activity
EC #	BRENDA	ExPASy	KEGG	MetaCyc
3.1.3.66	↗	↗	↗	↗

Gene location (Human)
Chr.	Chromosome 2 (human)
Band	2q11.2	Start	98,444,854 bp
Band	2q11.2	End	98,594,392 bp

Gene location (Mouse)
Chr.	Chromosome 1 (mouse)
Band	1 B|1 15.46 cM	Start	37,338,946 bp
Band	1 B|1 15.46 cM	End	37,449,817 bp
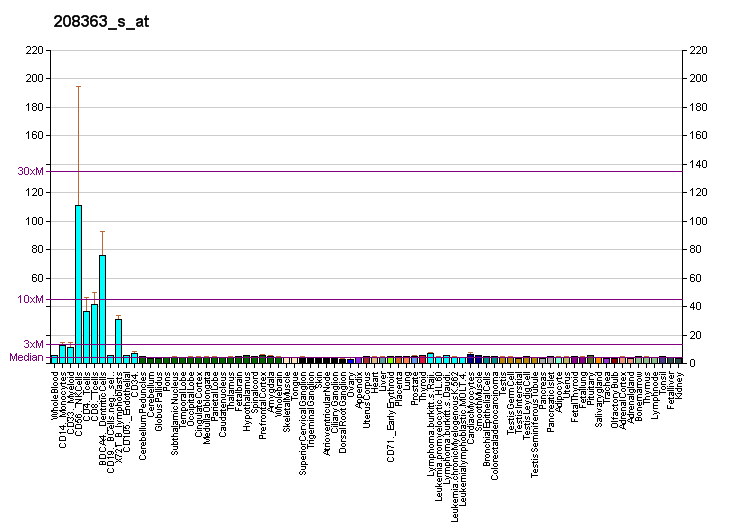

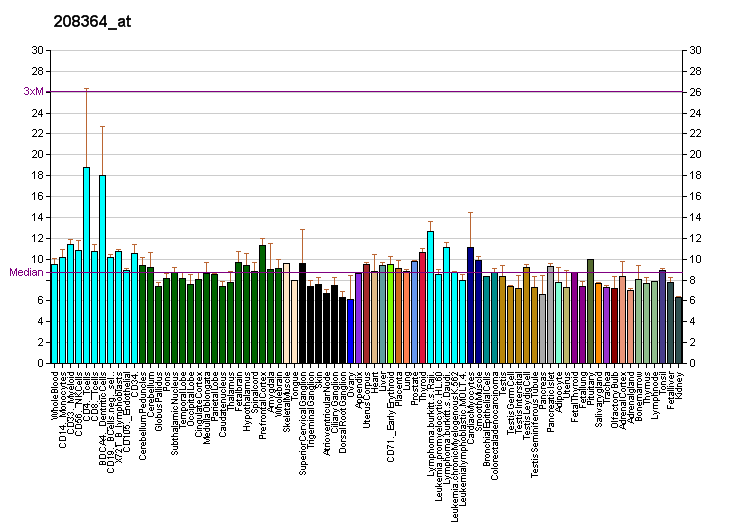

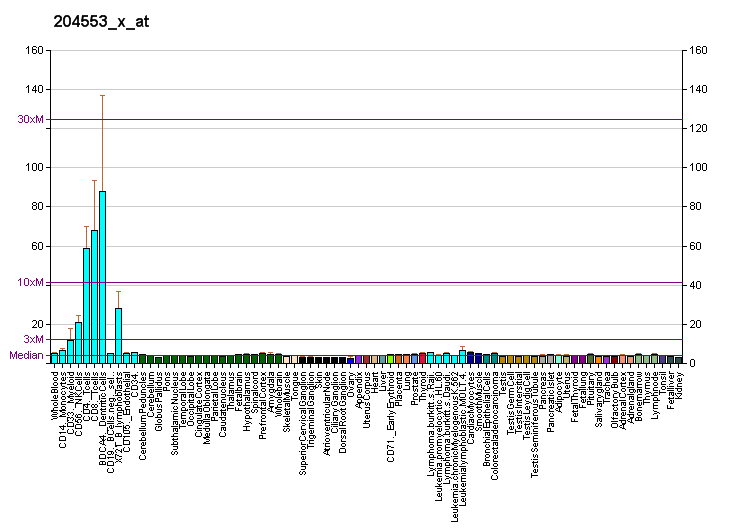
RNA expression pattern
Bgee	Human / Mouse (ortholog); Top expressed in: Brodmann area 23; endothelial cell; tibia; entorhinal cortex; postcentral gyrus; superior frontal gyrus; buccal mucosa cell; middle temporal gyrus; lateral nuclear group of thalamus; visceral pleura / Top expressed in: perirhinal cortex; entorhinal cortex; CA3 field; trigeminal ganglion; primary visual cortex; superior frontal gyrus; granulocyte; dentate gyrus of hippocampal formation granule cell; cerebellar cortex; Region I of hippocampus proper; More reference expression data
BioGPS	More reference expression data
Gene ontology
Molecular function	phosphatidylinositol-4,5-bisphosphate 4-phosphatase activity; protein binding; hydrolase activity; inositol-3,4-bisphosphate 4-phosphatase activity; phosphatidylinositol-3,4-bisphosphate 4-phosphatase activity; inositol-1,3,4-trisphosphate 4-phosphatase activity
Cellular component	cytosol; cytoplasm
Biological process	phosphatidylinositol biosynthetic process; phosphatidylinositol-3-phosphate biosynthetic process; inositol phosphate metabolic process; signal transduction; dephosphorylation
Sources:Amigo / QuickGO
Orthologs
Databases	NCBI: entry; OMA: entry
Species	Human	Mouse
Entrez	3631	269180
Ensembl	ENSG00000040933	ENSMUSG00000026113
UniProt	Q96PE3	Q9EPW0
RefSeq (mRNA)	NM_001134224; NM_001134225; NM_001566; NM_004027; NM_001351424 NM_001351425; NM_001351426; NM_001351427; NM_001351428; NM_001351429	NM_001290797; NM_001290798; NM_001290799; NM_030266; NM_172971 NM_001374629; NM_001374630
RefSeq (protein)	NP_001127696; NP_001127697; NP_001557; NP_004018; NP_001338353 NP_001338354; NP_001338355; NP_001338356; NP_001338357; NP_001338358	NP_001277726; NP_001277727; NP_001277728; NP_084542; NP_766559 NP_001361558; NP_001361559
Location (UCSC)	Chr 2: 98.44 – 98.59 Mb	Chr 1: 37.34 – 37.45 Mb
PubMed search
- Wikidata
View/Edit Human	View/Edit Mouse

Type I inositol-3,4-bisphosphate 4-phosphatase is an enzyme that in humans is encoded by the INPP4A gene.

INPP4A encodes the inositol polyphosphate 4-phosphatase type I, one of the enzymes involved in phosphatidylinositol signaling pathways. This enzyme removes the phosphate group at position 4 of the inositol ring from inositol 3,4-bisphosphate.
