= PIP4K2C =

Protein-coding gene in the species Homo sapiens

Identifiers
- Aliases: PIP4K2C, PIP5K2C, phosphatidylinositol-5-phosphate 4-kinase type 2 gamma
- External IDs: OMIM: 617104; MGI: 2152214; GeneCards: PIP4K2C
Available structures
PDB	Ortholog search: PDBe RCSB
PDB	List of PDB id codes 2GK9
Enzyme activity
EC #	BRENDA	ExPASy	KEGG	MetaCyc
2.7.1.149	↗	↗	↗	↗

Gene location (Human)
Chr.	Chromosome 12 (human)
Band	12q13.3	Start	57,591,174 bp
Band	12q13.3	End	57,603,418 bp

Gene location (Mouse)
Chr.	Chromosome 10 (mouse)
Band	10|10 D3	Start	127,032,936 bp
Band	10|10 D3	End	127,047,454 bp
RNA expression pattern
Bgee	Human / Mouse (ortholog); Top expressed in: corpus epididymis; secondary oocyte; hair follicle; renal medulla; Region I of hippocampus proper; pons; nasal epithelium; buccal mucosa cell; nipple; islet of Langerhans / Top expressed in: retinal pigment epithelium; neural layer of retina; primary motor cortex; pyloric antrum; human kidney; prefrontal cortex; epithelium of stomach; submandibular gland; parotid gland; CA3 field; More reference expression data
BioGPS	n/a
Gene ontology
Molecular function	transferase activity; nucleotide binding; kinase activity; phosphatidylinositol phosphate kinase activity; identical protein binding; ATP binding; 1-phosphatidylinositol-5-phosphate 4-kinase activity
Cellular component	cytoplasm; cytosol; membrane; autophagosome; extracellular exosome
Biological process	phosphatidylinositol metabolic process; positive regulation of autophagosome assembly; phosphorylation; phosphatidylinositol phosphate biosynthetic process; regulation of autophagy; phosphatidylinositol biosynthetic process; regulation of phosphatidylinositol 3-kinase signaling
Sources:Amigo / QuickGO
Orthologs
Databases	NCBI: entry; OMA: entry
Species	Human	Mouse
Entrez	79837	117150
Ensembl	ENSG00000166908	ENSMUSG00000025417
UniProt	Q8TBX8	Q91XU3
RefSeq (mRNA)	NM_001146258; NM_001146259; NM_001146260; NM_024779	NM_054097; NM_001359280
RefSeq (protein)	NP_001139730; NP_001139731; NP_001139732; NP_079055	NP_473438; NP_001346209
Location (UCSC)	Chr 12: 57.59 – 57.6 Mb	Chr 10: 127.03 – 127.05 Mb
PubMed search
- Wikidata
View/Edit Human	View/Edit Mouse

Phosphatidylinositol-5-phosphate 4-kinase, type II, gamma is an enzyme in humans that is encoded by the PIP4K2C gene. It is one of the phosphatidylinositol 4-phosphate 5-kinases.
