= CDIPT =

Protein-coding gene in humans

Identifiers
- Aliases: CDIPT, PIS, PIS1, CDP-diacylglycerol--inositol 3-phosphatidyltransferase
- External IDs: OMIM: 605893; MGI: 105491; HomoloGene: 7159; GeneCards: CDIPT; OMA:CDIPT - orthologs

Gene location (Human)
Chr.	Chromosome 16 (human)
Band	16p11.2	Start	29,858,357 bp
Band	16p11.2	End	29,863,414 bp

Gene location (Mouse)
Chr.	Chromosome 7 (mouse)
Band	7 F3|7 69.26 cM	Start	126,575,086 bp
Band	7 F3|7 69.26 cM	End	126,579,673 bp
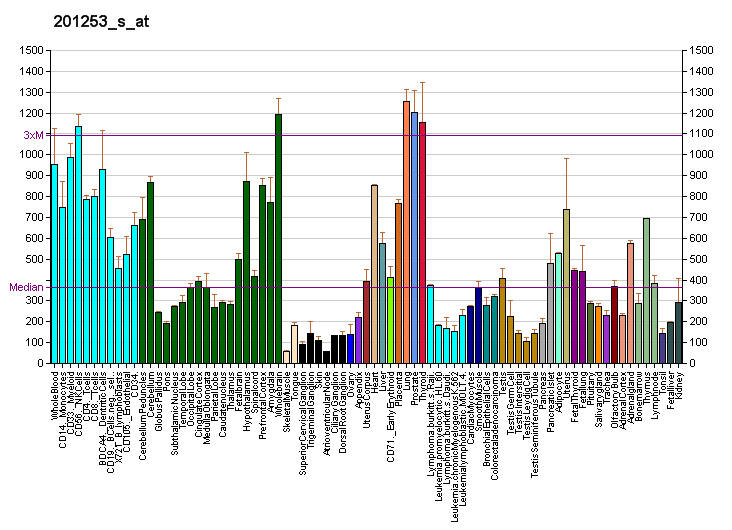
RNA expression pattern
Bgee	Human / Mouse (ortholog); Top expressed in: parotid gland; endothelial cell; Brodmann area 23; sperm; middle temporal gyrus; pancreatic ductal cell; germinal epithelium; visceral pleura; parietal pleura; gingival epithelium / Top expressed in: Paneth cell; motor neuron; substantia nigra; retinal pigment epithelium; barrel cortex; seminal vesicula; endocardial cushion; fossa; facial motor nucleus; medullary collecting duct; More reference expression data
BioGPS	More reference expression data
Gene ontology
Molecular function	transferase activity; phosphotransferase activity, for other substituted phosphate groups; manganese ion binding; alcohol binding; CDP-diacylglycerol-inositol 3-phosphatidyltransferase activity; protein binding; diacylglycerol binding; carbohydrate binding
Cellular component	integral component of membrane; Golgi apparatus; endoplasmic reticulum membrane; membrane; Golgi membrane; plasma membrane; endoplasmic reticulum
Biological process	lipid metabolism; CDP-diacylglycerol metabolic process; phospholipid biosynthetic process; phosphatidylinositol biosynthetic process
Sources:Amigo / QuickGO
Orthologs
Species	Human	Mouse
Entrez	10423	52858
Ensembl	ENSG00000103502	ENSMUSG00000030682
UniProt	O14735	Q8VDP6
RefSeq (mRNA)	NM_001286585; NM_001286586; NM_006319; NM_145752	NM_026638; NM_001347656; NM_001379260
RefSeq (protein)	NP_001273514; NP_001273515; NP_006310; NP_001273514.1; NP_001273515.1 NP_006310.1	NP_001334585; NP_080914; NP_001366189
Location (UCSC)	Chr 16: 29.86 – 29.86 Mb	Chr 7: 126.58 – 126.58 Mb
PubMed search
- Wikidata
View/Edit Human	View/Edit Mouse

CDP-diacylglycerol—inositol 3-phosphatidyltransferase is an enzyme that in humans is encoded by the CDIPT gene.

Phosphatidylinositol breakdown products are ubiquitous second messengers that function downstream of multiple G protein-coupled receptors and tyrosine kinases regulating cell growth, calcium metabolism, and protein kinase C activity. Two enzymes, CDP-diacylglycerol synthase and phosphatidylinositol synthase, are involved in the biosynthesis of phosphatidylinositol. Phosphatidylinositol synthase, a member of the CDP-alcohol phosphatidyl transferase class-I family, is an integral membrane protein found on the cytoplasmic side of the endoplasmic reticulum and the Golgi apparatus.
