= PI(4,5)P2 Cycle =

The PI(4,5)P_{2} cycle or simply PIP_{2} cycle (also known as PI cycle in past) is one of the important signalling cascades underlying many cellular functions including GPCR signaling, cytokinesis, endocytosis, and apoptosis.

== Signalling steps ==
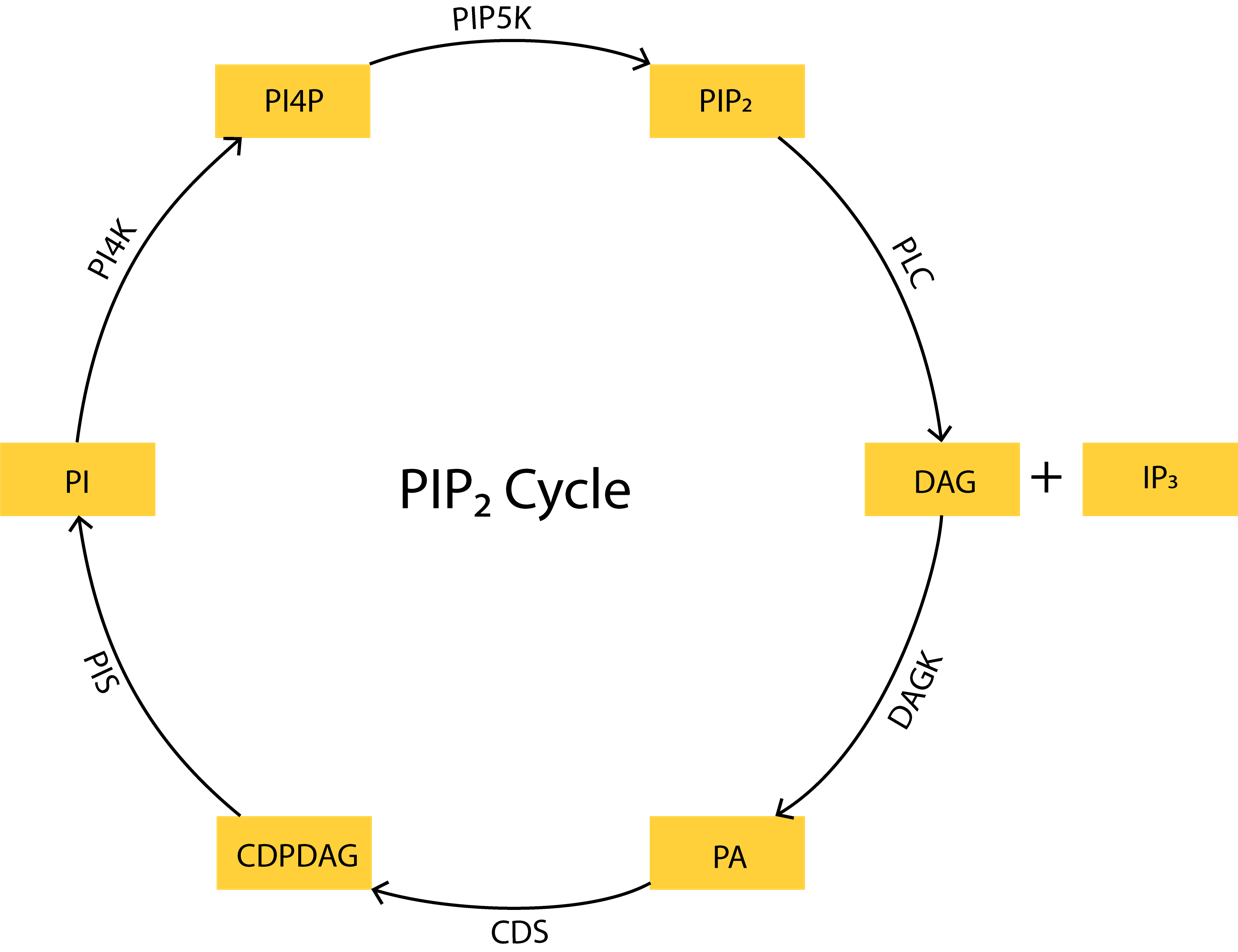
General PI(4,5)P2 cycle

PIP_{2} cycle involves steps of chemical reactions characterized by various enzymes. First hydrolysis of PIP_{2} molecules by activated phospholipase C leads to formation of diacylglycerol and inositol trisphosphate. These two are themselves important second messengers. Diacylglycerol further converted into phosphatidic acid (PA) by DAGK enzyme. Furthermore, CDP-diacylglycerol synthetase uses CTP to create cytidine diphosphate diacylglycerol from PA. Generated CDP-DAG then condensed to PI by phosphatidylinositol synthase. This PI is then phosphorylated to PI4P and back to PIP_{2} via action of PI4K and PIP5K
