= CDS2 =

Protein-coding gene in humans

Identifiers
- Aliases: CDS2, CDP-diacylglycerol synthase 2
- External IDs: OMIM: 603549; MGI: 1332236; HomoloGene: 37854; GeneCards: CDS2; OMA:CDS2 - orthologs

Gene location (Human)
Chr.	Chromosome 20 (human)
Band	20p12.3	Start	5,126,879 bp
Band	20p12.3	End	5,197,887 bp

Gene location (Mouse)
Chr.	Chromosome 2 (mouse)
Band	2 F2|2 64.15 cM	Start	132,105,068 bp
Band	2 F2|2 64.15 cM	End	132,153,970 bp
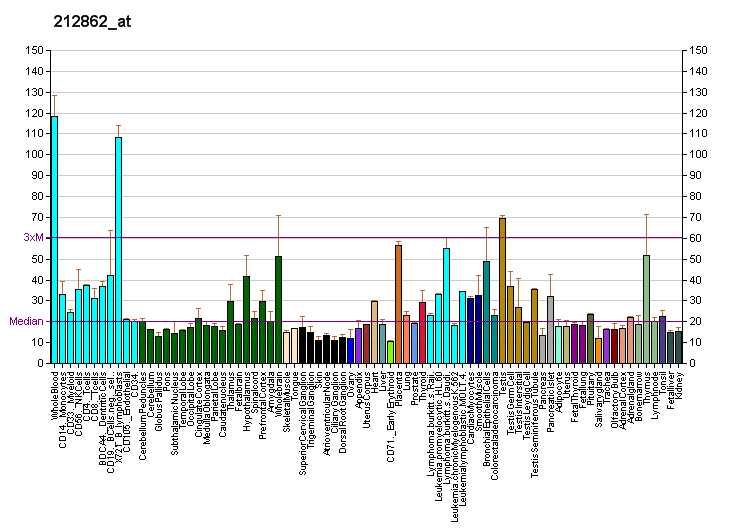

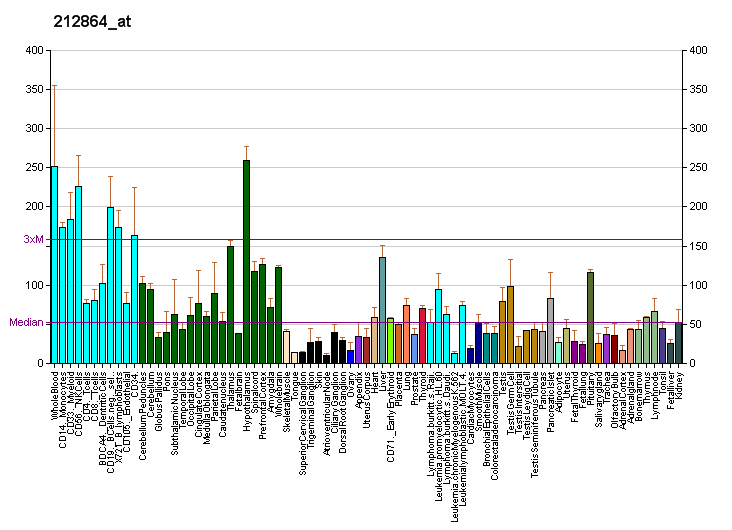
RNA expression pattern
Bgee	Human / Mouse (ortholog); Top expressed in: lateral nuclear group of thalamus; middle temporal gyrus; pars compacta; pars reticulata; postcentral gyrus; spinal ganglia; entorhinal cortex; superior vestibular nucleus; external globus pallidus; ventral tegmental area / Top expressed in: motor neuron; substantia nigra; facial motor nucleus; habenula; Epithelium of choroid plexus; renal corpuscle; ciliary body; deep cerebellar nuclei; medial vestibular nucleus; medullary collecting duct; More reference expression data
BioGPS	More reference expression data
Gene ontology
Molecular function	transferase activity; transferase activity, transferring phosphorus-containing groups; nucleotidyltransferase activity; phosphatidate cytidylyltransferase activity
Cellular component	integral component of membrane; endoplasmic reticulum membrane; mitochondrion; endoplasmic reticulum; membrane; mitochondrial inner membrane
Biological process	phosphatidylglycerol biosynthetic process; CDP-diacylglycerol biosynthetic process; lipid metabolism; phospholipid biosynthetic process
Sources:Amigo / QuickGO
Orthologs
Species	Human	Mouse
Entrez	8760	110911
Ensembl	ENSG00000101290	ENSMUSG00000058793
UniProt	O95674	Q99L43
RefSeq (mRNA)	NM_003818	NM_001291039; NM_001291040; NM_138651
RefSeq (protein)	NP_003809	NP_001277968; NP_001277969; NP_619592
Location (UCSC)	Chr 20: 5.13 – 5.2 Mb	Chr 2: 132.11 – 132.15 Mb
PubMed search
- Wikidata
View/Edit Human	View/Edit Mouse

Phosphatidate cytidylyltransferase 2 is an enzyme that in humans is encoded by the CDS2 gene.

Breakdown products of phosphoinositides are ubiquitous second messengers that function downstream of many G protein-coupled receptors and tyrosine kinases regulating cell growth, calcium metabolism, and protein kinase C activity. This gene encodes an enzyme which regulates the amount of phosphatidylinositol available for signaling by catalyzing the conversion of phosphatidic acid to CDP-diacylglycerol. This enzyme is an integral membrane protein localized to two subcellular domains, the matrix side of the inner mitochondrial membrane where it is thought to be involved in the synthesis of phosphatidylglycerol and cardiolipin. and the cytoplasmic side of the endoplasmic reticulum where it functions in phosphatidylinositol biosynthesis. Two genes encoding this enzyme have been identified in humans, one mapping to human chromosome 4q21 (CDS1) and a second (this gene) to 20p13.
