= CDS1 =

Protein-coding gene in humans

Identifiers
- Aliases: CDS1, CDS, CDP-diacylglycerol synthase 1, CDS 1
- External IDs: OMIM: 603548; MGI: 1921846; HomoloGene: 68173; GeneCards: CDS1; OMA:CDS1 - orthologs

Gene location (Human)
Chr.	Chromosome 4 (human)
Band	4q21.23	Start	84,583,127 bp
Band	4q21.23	End	84,651,334 bp

Gene location (Mouse)
Chr.	Chromosome 5 (mouse)
Band	5|5 E5	Start	101,912,996 bp
Band	5|5 E5	End	101,971,724 bp
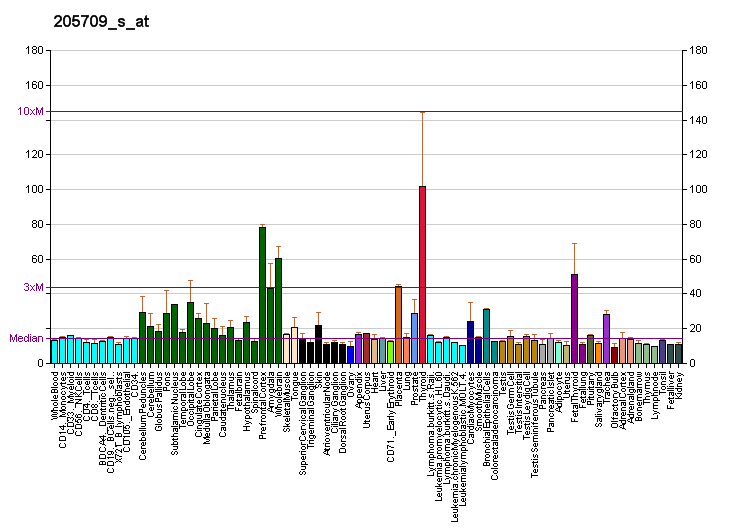
RNA expression pattern
Bgee	Human / Mouse (ortholog); Top expressed in: bronchial epithelial cell; secondary oocyte; caput epididymis; amniotic fluid; jejunal mucosa; mucosa of paranasal sinus; corpus epididymis; middle temporal gyrus; nasal epithelium; Brodmann area 23 / Top expressed in: transitional epithelium of urinary bladder; neural layer of retina; jejunum; nasal epithelium; olfactory epithelium; ileum; retinal pigment epithelium; vestibular membrane of cochlear duct; otolith organ; utricle; More reference expression data
BioGPS	More reference expression data
Gene ontology
Molecular function	transferase activity, transferring phosphorus-containing groups; nucleotidyltransferase activity; diacylglycerol cholinephosphotransferase activity; transferase activity; phosphatidate cytidylyltransferase activity
Cellular component	membrane; integral component of membrane; endoplasmic reticulum; endoplasmic reticulum membrane
Biological process	phototransduction; phospholipid biosynthetic process; phosphatidylglycerol biosynthetic process; CDP-diacylglycerol biosynthetic process; lipid metabolism; signal transduction; phosphatidylinositol biosynthetic process; CDP-choline pathway
Sources:Amigo / QuickGO
Orthologs
Species	Human	Mouse
Entrez	1040	74596
Ensembl	ENSG00000163624	ENSMUSG00000029330
UniProt	Q92903	P98191
RefSeq (mRNA)	NM_001263	NM_173370
RefSeq (protein)	NP_001254	NP_775546
Location (UCSC)	Chr 4: 84.58 – 84.65 Mb	Chr 5: 101.91 – 101.97 Mb
PubMed search
- Wikidata
View/Edit Human	View/Edit Mouse

Phosphatidate cytidylyltransferase 1 is an enzyme that in humans is encoded by the CDS1 gene.

== Function ==
Breakdown products of phosphoinositides are ubiquitous second messengers that function downstream of many G protein-coupled receptors and tyrosine kinases regulating cell growth, calcium metabolism, and protein kinase C activity. This gene encodes an enzyme which regulates the amount of phosphatidylinositol available for signaling by catalyzing the conversion of phosphatidic acid to CDP-diacylglycerol. This enzyme is an integral membrane protein localized to two subcellular domains, the matrix side of the inner mitochondrial membrane where it is thought to be involved in the synthesis of phosphatidylglycerol and cardiolipin. and the cytoplasmic side of the endoplasmic reticulum where it functions in phosphatidylinositol biosynthesis. Two genes encoding this enzyme have been identified in humans, one mapping to human chromosome 4q21 (this gene) and a second (CDS2) to 20p13.
