= ACBD3 =

Protein-coding gene in humans

Identifiers
- Aliases: ACBD3, GCP60, GOCAP1, GOLPH1, PAP7, acyl-CoA binding domain containing 3
- External IDs: OMIM: 606809; MGI: 2181074; GeneCards: ACBD3
Available structures
PDB	Ortholog search: PDBe RCSB
PDB	List of PDB id codes 2N72

Gene location (Human)
Chr.	Chromosome 1 (human)
Band	1q42.12	Start	226,144,679 bp
Band	1q42.12	End	226,186,741 bp

Gene location (Mouse)
Chr.	Chromosome 1 (mouse)
Band	1 H4|1 84.46 cM	Start	180,553,608 bp
Band	1 H4|1 84.46 cM	End	180,581,769 bp
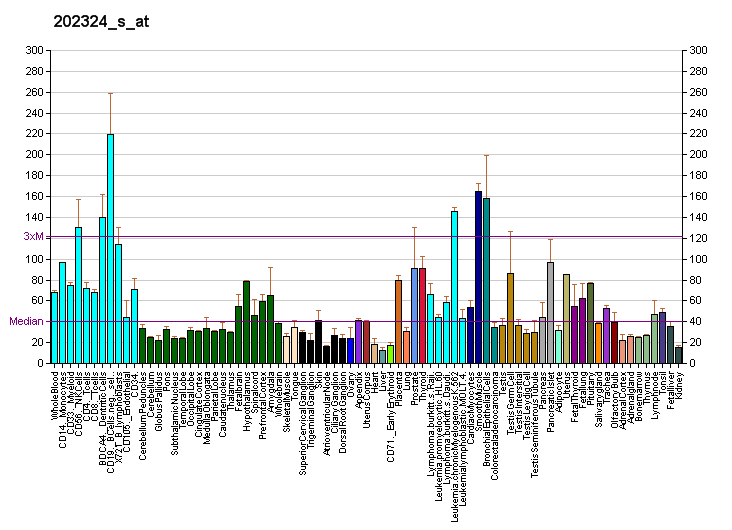
RNA expression pattern
Bgee	Human / Mouse (ortholog); Top expressed in: tibia; buccal mucosa cell; Epithelium of choroid plexus; amniotic fluid; gingival epithelium; endothelial cell; palpebral conjunctiva; secondary oocyte; cartilage tissue; germinal epithelium / Top expressed in: secondary oocyte; zygote; primary oocyte; medullary collecting duct; aortic valve; ascending aorta; left colon; urothelium; umbilical cord; parotid gland; More reference expression data
BioGPS	More reference expression data
Gene ontology
Molecular function	protein kinase A regulatory subunit binding; protein binding; fatty-acyl-CoA binding
Cellular component	integral component of membrane; Golgi apparatus; membrane; mitochondrion; Golgi membrane
Biological process	steroid biosynthetic process; lipid metabolism; transport
Sources:Amigo / QuickGO
Orthologs
Databases	NCBI: entry; OMA: entry
Species	Human	Mouse
Entrez	64746	170760
Ensembl	ENSG00000182827	ENSMUSG00000026499
UniProt	Q9H3P7	Q8BMP6
RefSeq (mRNA)	NM_022735	NM_133225
RefSeq (protein)	NP_073572; NP_073572.2	NP_573488
Location (UCSC)	Chr 1: 226.14 – 226.19 Mb	Chr 1: 180.55 – 180.58 Mb
PubMed search
- Wikidata
View/Edit Human	View/Edit Mouse

Golgi resident protein GCP60 is a protein that in humans is encoded by the ACBD3 gene.

== Function ==
The Golgi complex plays a key role in the sorting and modification of proteins exported from the endoplasmic reticulum. ACBD3 is involved in maintaining the Golgi structure by interacting with giantin, which affects the transport of protein. The protein encoded by this gene is involved in the maintenance of Golgi structure and function through its interaction with the integral membrane protein giantin. It may also be involved in the hormonal regulation of steroid formation.

== Interactions ==
ACBD3 has been shown to interact with GOLGB1.
