= AGPAT1 =

Protein-coding gene in the species Homo sapiens

Identifiers
- Aliases: AGPAT1, 1-G15, LPAAT-alpha, LPAATA, 1-acylglycerol-3-phosphate O-acyltransferase 1
- External IDs: OMIM: 603099; MGI: 1932075; GeneCards: AGPAT1
Enzyme activity
EC #	BRENDA	ExPASy	KEGG	MetaCyc
2.3.1.51	↗	↗	↗	↗

Gene location (Human)
Chr.	Chromosome 6 (human)
Band	6p21.32	Start	32,168,212 bp
Band	6p21.32	End	32,178,096 bp

Gene location (Mouse)
Chr.	Chromosome 17 (mouse)
Band	17 B1|17 18.18 cM	Start	34,823,236 bp
Band	17 B1|17 18.18 cM	End	34,832,423 bp
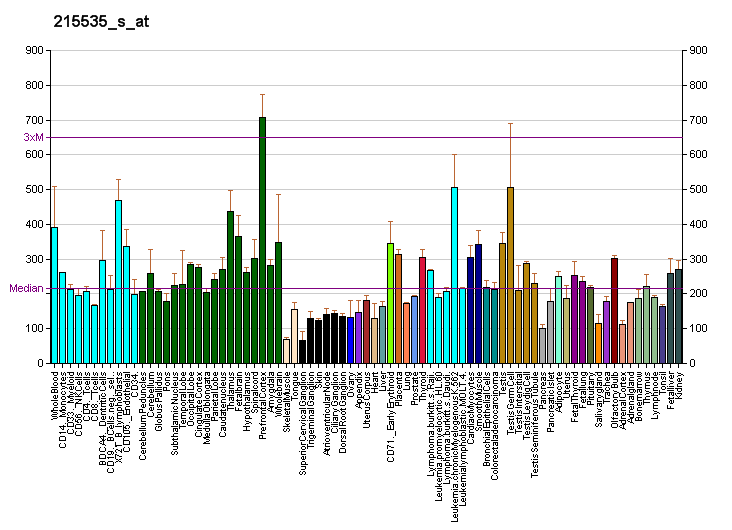

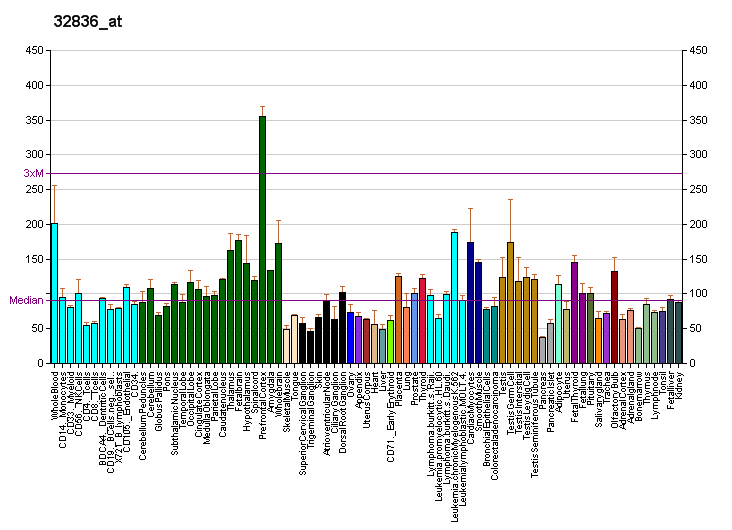
RNA expression pattern
Bgee	Human / Mouse (ortholog); Top expressed in: right frontal lobe; superior frontal gyrus; left testis; right testis; anterior cingulate cortex; primary visual cortex; stromal cell of endometrium; hippocampus proper; dorsolateral prefrontal cortex; nucleus accumbens / Top expressed in: spermatid; spermatocyte; endocardial cushion; muscle of thigh; superior frontal gyrus; yolk sac; primary visual cortex; atrioventricular valve; dentate gyrus of hippocampal formation granule cell; granulocyte; More reference expression data
BioGPS	More reference expression data
Gene ontology
Molecular function	transferase activity; acyltransferase activity; 1-acylglycerol-3-phosphate O-acyltransferase activity; protein binding
Cellular component	integral component of membrane; endoplasmic reticulum membrane; membrane; endoplasmic reticulum
Biological process	phosphatidic acid biosynthetic process; CDP-diacylglycerol biosynthetic process; positive regulation of cytokine-mediated signaling pathway; positive regulation of cytokine production; lipid metabolism; phospholipid biosynthetic process; phospholipid metabolic process; metabolism; positive regulation of cellular metabolic process
Sources:Amigo / QuickGO
Orthologs
Databases	NCBI: entry; OMA: entry
Species	Human	Mouse
Entrez	10554	55979
Ensembl	ENSG00000236873; ENSG00000235758; ENSG00000228892; ENSG00000204310; ENSG00000226467 ENSG00000227642; ENSG00000206324	ENSMUSG00000034254
UniProt	Q99943	O35083
RefSeq (mRNA)	NM_006411; NM_032741; NM_001371437; NM_001371438; NM_001371439	NM_001163379; NM_018862
RefSeq (protein)	NP_006402; NP_116130; NP_001358366; NP_001358367; NP_001358368	NP_001156851; NP_061350
Location (UCSC)	Chr 6: 32.17 – 32.18 Mb	Chr 17: 34.82 – 34.83 Mb
PubMed search
- Wikidata
View/Edit Human	View/Edit Mouse

1-acyl-sn-glycerol-3-phosphate acyltransferase alpha is an enzyme encoded by the AGPAT1 gene in humans.

This gene encodes an enzyme that converts lysophosphatidic acid (LPA) into phosphatidic acid (PA). Both LPA and PA are phospholipids involved in signal transduction and in lipid biosynthesis within cells. The enzyme is localized in the endoplasmic reticulum. The gene is situated in the class III region of the human major histocompatibility complex (MHC). Alternative splicing of this gene results in two transcript variants, both of which encode the same protein.
