= 1-phosphatidylinositol 4-kinase =

Class of enzymes

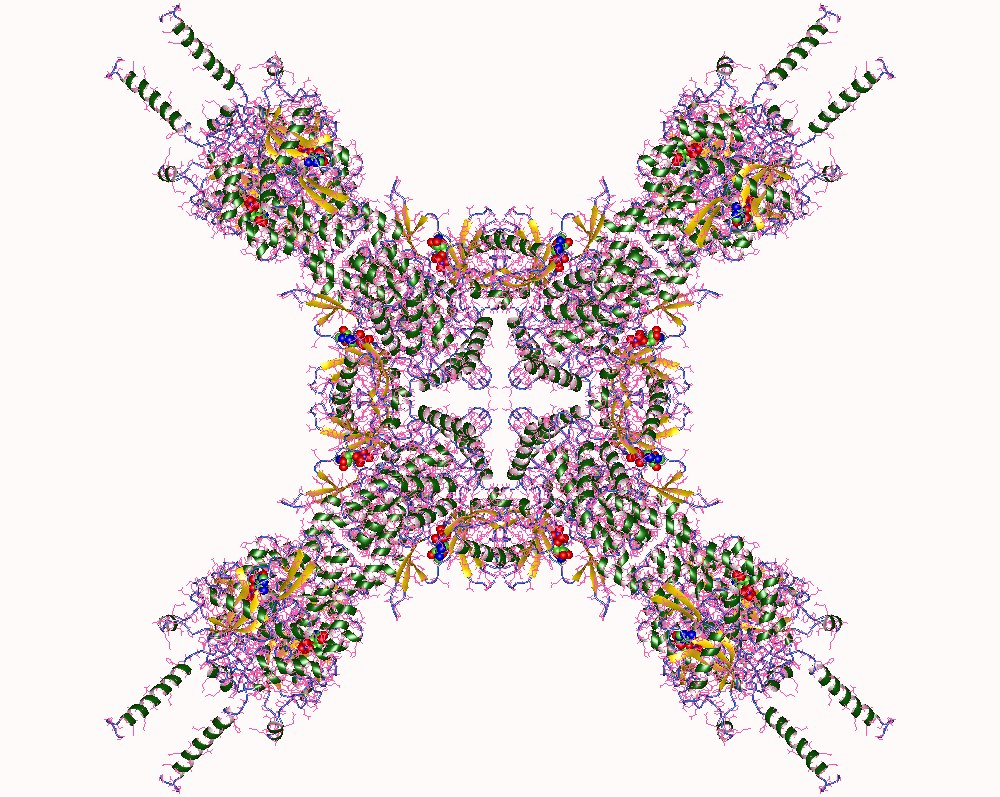
- Phosphatidylinositol 4-kinase homo16mer, Human

Identifiers
- EC no.: 2.7.1.67
- CAS no.: 37205-54-2

Databases
- BRENDA: enzyme data
- ExPASy: NiceZyme view
- KEGG: enzyme entry
- MetaCyc: metabolic pathway
- Rhea: reactions
- PDB structures: RCSB PDB PDBe PDBsum
- Gene Ontology: AmiGO / QuickGO
Search
- PMC: articles
- PubMed: articles
- NCBI: proteins

In enzymology, a 1-phosphatidylinositol 4-kinase (EC 2.7.1.67) is an enzyme that catalyzes the chemical reaction

ATP + 1-phosphatidyl-1D-myo-inositol $\rightleftharpoons$ ADP + 1-phosphatidyl-1D-myo-inositol 4-phosphate

Thus, the two substrates of this enzyme are ATP and 1-phosphatidyl-1D-myo-inositol, whereas its two products are ADP and 1-phosphatidyl-1D-myo-inositol 4-phosphate.

This enzyme belongs to the family of transferases, specifically those transferring phosphorus-containing groups (phosphotransferases) with an alcohol group as acceptor. The systematic name of this enzyme class is ATP:1-phosphatidyl-1D-myo-inositol 4-phosphotransferase. Other names in common use include phosphatidylinositol kinase (phosphorylating), phosphatidylinositol 4-kinase, phosphatidylinositol kinase, type II phosphatidylinositol kinase, PI kinase, and PI 4-kinase. This enzyme participates in inositol phosphate metabolism and phosphatidylinositol signaling system.

== Structural studies ==
As of late 2007, the structure has only been solved for this enzyme. Part of the enzyme was crystallized with its activating partner frequenin.
