= PI4KA =

Protein-coding gene in the species Homo sapiens

Identifiers
- Aliases: PI4KA, PI4K-ALPHA, PIK4CA, pi4K230, PMGYCHA, phosphatidylinositol 4-kinase alpha, SPG84, GIDID2
- External IDs: OMIM: 600286; MGI: 2448506; GeneCards: PI4KA
Enzyme activity
EC #	BRENDA	ExPASy	KEGG	MetaCyc
2.7.1.67	↗	↗	↗	↗

Gene location (Human)
Chr.	Chromosome 22 (human)
Band	22q11.21	Start	20,707,691 bp
Band	22q11.21	End	20,859,417 bp

Gene location (Mouse)
Chr.	Chromosome 16 (mouse)
Band	16|16 A3	Start	17,098,215 bp
Band	16|16 A3	End	17,224,178 bp
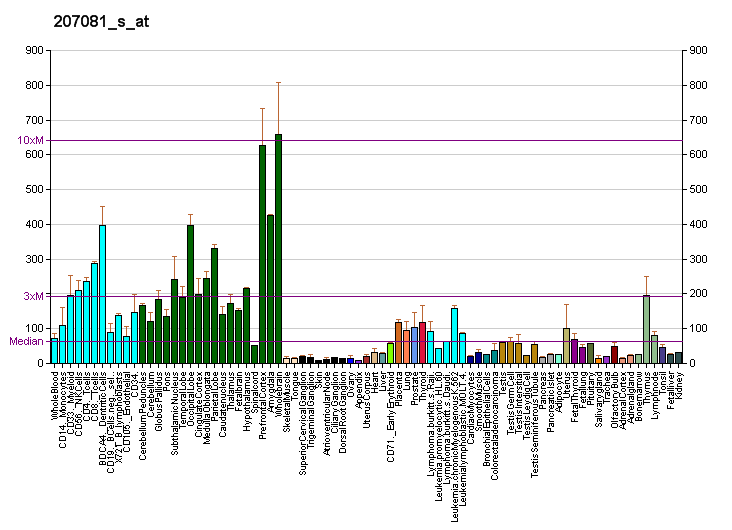

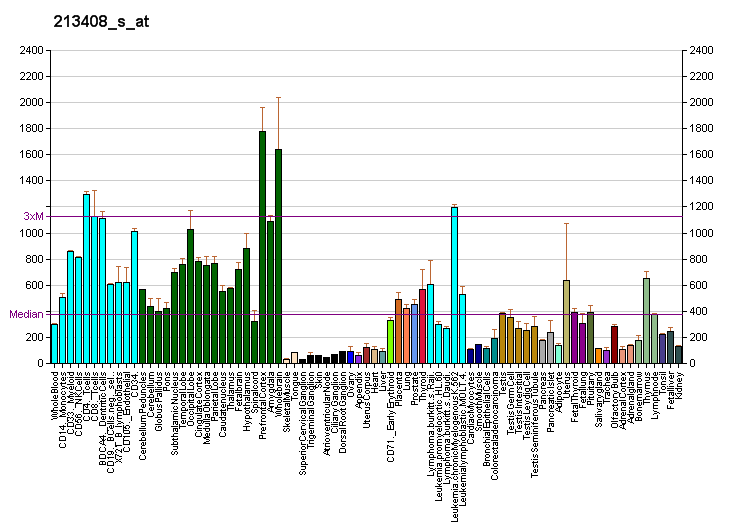
RNA expression pattern
Bgee	Human / Mouse (ortholog); Top expressed in: superior frontal gyrus; right frontal lobe; Brodmann area 9; right hemisphere of cerebellum; primary visual cortex; prefrontal cortex; anterior cingulate cortex; nucleus accumbens; pituitary gland; putamen / Top expressed in: substantia nigra; superior frontal gyrus; primary motor cortex; prefrontal cortex; subiculum; medial dorsal nucleus; medial geniculate nucleus; medial vestibular nucleus; dorsal striatum; neural layer of retina; More reference expression data
BioGPS	More reference expression data
Gene ontology
Molecular function	transferase activity; nucleotide binding; protein binding; ATP binding; 1-phosphatidylinositol 4-kinase activity; kinase activity; cadherin binding
Cellular component	cytoplasm; Golgi-associated vesicle membrane; cytosol; extracellular exosome; membrane; focal adhesion; plasma membrane
Biological process	phosphatidylinositol biosynthetic process; phosphatidylinositol phosphate biosynthetic process; signal transduction; viral RNA genome replication; phosphorylation; actin cytoskeleton organization; phosphatidylinositol-mediated signaling
Sources:Amigo / QuickGO
Orthologs
Databases	NCBI: entry; OMA: entry
Species	Human	Mouse
Entrez	5297	224020
Ensembl	ENSG00000241973	ENSMUSG00000041720
UniProt	P42356	E9Q3L2
RefSeq (mRNA)	NM_002650; NM_058004; NM_001362862; NM_001362863	NM_001001983; NM_001373955
RefSeq (protein)	NP_477352; NP_001349791; NP_001349792	NP_001001983
Location (UCSC)	Chr 22: 20.71 – 20.86 Mb	Chr 16: 17.1 – 17.22 Mb
PubMed search
- Wikidata
View/Edit Human	View/Edit Mouse

Phosphatidylinositol 4-kinase alpha is an enzyme that in humans is encoded by the PI4KA gene.

== Function ==
This gene encodes a 1-phosphatidylinositol 4-kinase which catalyzes the first committed step in the biosynthesis of phosphatidylinositol 4,5-bisphosphate. The mammalian PI 4-kinases have been classified into two types, II and III, based on their molecular mass, and modulation by detergent and adenosine. Two transcript variants encoding different isoforms have been described for this gene.

== Clinical significance ==
The alpha isoform of PI4KIII plays a role in replication of hepatitis C virus (HCV). Furthermore, the PI4KA lipid kinase affects HCV replication by altering phosphorylation of the HCV NS5A protein.
