= PI4K2B =

Protein-coding gene in the species Homo sapiens

Identifiers
- Aliases: PI4K2B, PI4KIIB, PIK42B, phosphatidylinositol 4-kinase type 2 beta
- External IDs: OMIM: 612101; MGI: 1914323; GeneCards: PI4K2B
Available structures
PDB	Ortholog search: PDBe RCSB
PDB	List of PDB id codes 4WTV
Enzyme activity
EC #	BRENDA	ExPASy	KEGG	MetaCyc
2.7.1.67	↗	↗	↗	↗

Gene location (Human)
Chr.	Chromosome 4 (human)
Band	4p15.2	Start	25,160,663 bp
Band	4p15.2	End	25,279,204 bp

Gene location (Mouse)
Chr.	Chromosome 5 (mouse)
Band	5|5 C1	Start	52,898,916 bp
Band	5|5 C1	End	52,926,682 bp
RNA expression pattern
Bgee	Human / Mouse (ortholog); Top expressed in: secondary oocyte; jejunal mucosa; duodenum; skin of arm; mucosa of ileum; epithelium of nasopharynx; liver; pancreatic epithelial cell; mucosa of paranasal sinus; rectum / Top expressed in: left lung lobe; lacrimal gland; decidua; epithelium of small intestine; gastrula; parotid gland; jejunum; intestinal villus; right lung; crypt of lieberkuhn of small intestine; More reference expression data
BioGPS	n/a
Gene ontology
Molecular function	transferase activity; nucleotide binding; ATP binding; kinase activity; 1-phosphatidylinositol 4-kinase activity
Cellular component	cytosol; membrane; cytoplasm; lysosomal membrane; endosome; trans-Golgi network; plasma membrane
Biological process	phosphatidylinositol biosynthetic process; phosphorylation; Golgi organization; endosome organization; phosphatidylinositol phosphate biosynthetic process
Sources:Amigo / QuickGO
Orthologs
Databases	NCBI: entry; OMA: entry
Species	Human	Mouse
Entrez	55300	67073
Ensembl	ENSG00000038210	ENSMUSG00000029186
UniProt	Q8TCG2	Q8CBQ5
RefSeq (mRNA)	NM_018323	NM_025951; NM_028744
RefSeq (protein)	NP_060793	NP_080227; NP_083020
Location (UCSC)	Chr 4: 25.16 – 25.28 Mb	Chr 5: 52.9 – 52.93 Mb
PubMed search
- Wikidata
View/Edit Human	View/Edit Mouse

Phosphatidylinositol 4-kinase type 2-beta is an enzyme that in humans is encoded by the PI4K2B gene.
