= Phosphatidylinositol =

Signaling molecule

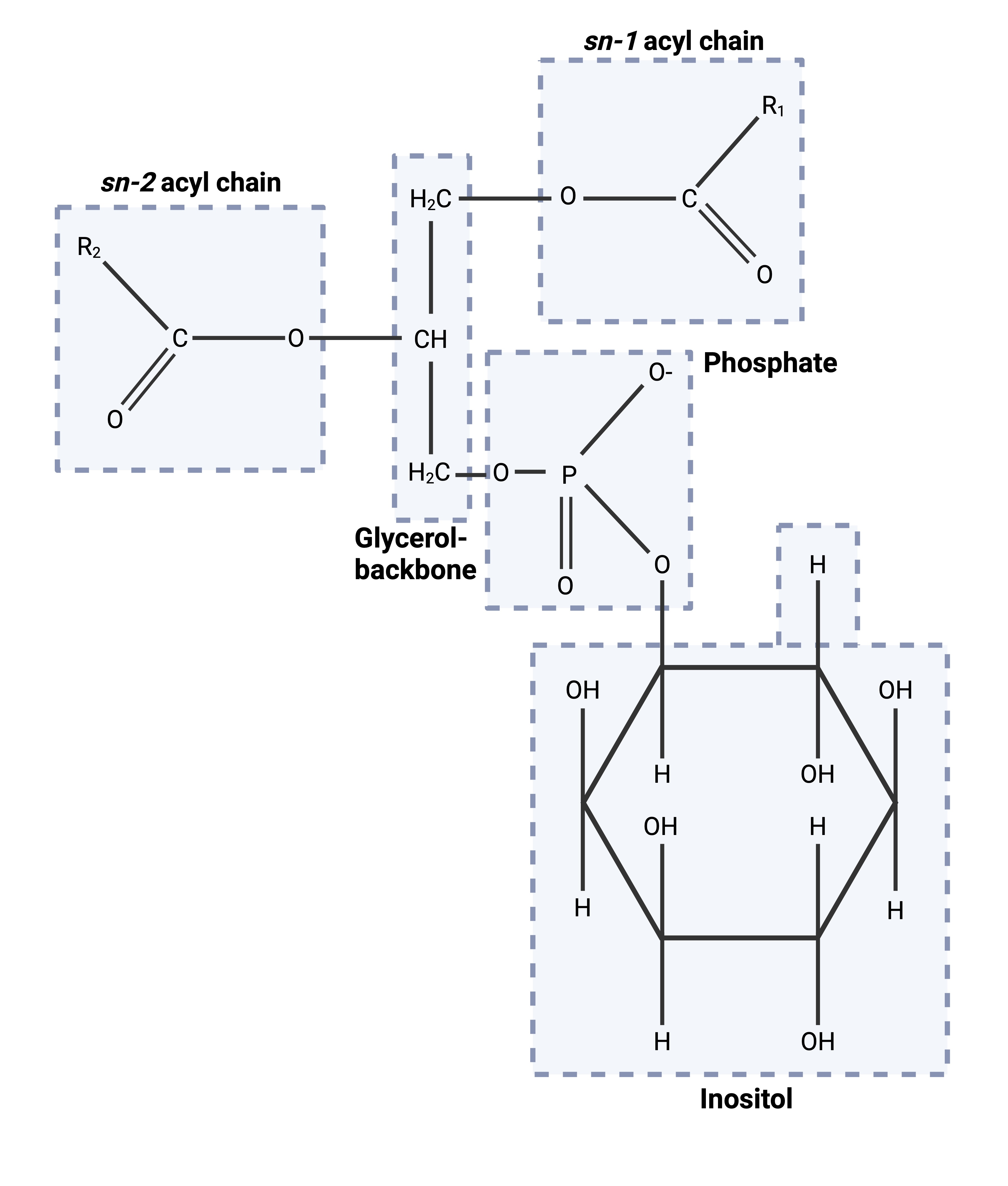
- Depicting the phosphatidylinositol molecule with an overview of different segregated components; Inositol, Phosphate, Glycerol-backbone, sn-1 acyl chain, sn-2 acyl chain.

Names
- IUPAC name [(2R)-3-[hydroxy-[(5R)-2,3,4,5,6-pentahydroxycyclohexyl]oxyphosphoryl]oxy-2-octadecanoyloxypropyl] (8Z,11Z,14Z,17Z)-icosa-8,11,14,17-tetraenoate
- Other names: PI; PtdIns

Identifiers
ChEBI	CHEBI:28874
DrugBank	DB02144

Properties
Chemical formula	C_{47}H_{83}O_{13}P
Molar mass	887,104 g/mol, neutral with fatty acid composition - 18:0, 20:4
- Except where otherwise noted, data are given for materials in their standard state (at 25 °C [77 °F], 100 kPa). verify (what is ?) Infobox references

Phosphatidylinositol or inositol phospholipid is a biomolecule. It was initially called "inosite" when it was discovered by Léon Maquenne and Johann Joseph von Scherer in the late 19th century. It was discovered in bacteria but later also found in eukaryotes, and was found to be a signaling molecule.

The biomolecule can exist in nine different isomers. It is a lipid which contains a phosphate group, two fatty acid chains, and one inositol sugar molecule. Typically, the phosphate group has a negative charge (at physiological pH values). As a result, the molecule is amphiphilic.

The production of the molecule is limited to the endoplasmic reticulum.

== History of phospatidylinositol ==
Phosphatidylinositol (PI) and its derivatives have a rich history dating back to their discovery by Johann Joseph von Scherer and Léon Maquenne in the late 19th century. Initially known as "inosite" based on its sweet taste, the isolation and characterization of inositol laid the groundwork for understanding its cyclohexanol structure. Théodore Posternak's work further elucidated the configuration of myo-inositol, the principal form found in eukaryotic tissues. The study of inositol isomers and their physiological functions has revealed a complex interplay in various organisms.

The esterified presence of inositol in lipids, particularly PI, was first observed in bacteria and later confirmed in eukaryotic organisms by researchers like Clinton Ballou and Dan Brown. Their pioneering work established the structure of PI and its phosphorylated forms, shedding light on their roles as signaling molecules. Despite the complexity of inositol nomenclature and isomerism, modern research has greatly advanced the understanding of their diverse functions in cellular physiology and signaling pathways.

The discovery of PI and its derivatives, along with their intricate roles in cellular signaling, marks a significant chapter in the field of biochemistry. From early investigations into inositol's structure to the identification of its various isomers and their physiological functions, the study of inositol compounds continues to uncover new insights into cellular processes.

== Structure and chemistry ==
Phosphatidylinositol (PI), also known as inositol phospholipid, is a lipid composed of a phosphate group, two fatty acid chains, and one inositol molecule. It belongs to the class of phosphatidylglycerides and is typically found as a minor component on the cytosolic side of eukaryotic cell membranes. The phosphate group imparts a negative charge to the molecules at physiological pH.

PI can exist in nine different forms: myo-, scyllo-, muco-, epi-, neo-, allo-, D-chiro-, L-chiro-, and cis-inositol. These isomers are common in biology and have many functions, for example taste sensory, regulating phosphate levels, metabolic flux, transcription, mRNA export and translation, insulin signaling, embryonic development and stress response. Cis-inositol is the only isomer not found in nature.

PI exhibits an amphiphilic nature, with both polar and non-polar regions, due to its glycerophospholipid structure containing a glycerol backbone, two non-polar fatty acid tails, and a phosphate group substituted with an inositol polar head group.

== Phosphoinositides ==
Phosphorylated forms of phosphatidylinositol (PI) are called phosphoinositides and play important roles in lipid signaling, cell signaling and membrane trafficking. The inositol ring can be phosphorylated by a variety of kinases on the three, four and five hydroxyl groups in seven different combinations. However, the two and six hydroxyl groups are typically not phosphorylated due to steric hindrance.

All seven variations of the following phosphoinositides have been found in animals:

Phosphatidylinositol monophosphates:

- Phosphatidylinositol 3-phosphate, also known as PtdIns3P or PI(3)P
- Phosphatidylinositol 4-phosphate, also known as PtdIns4P or PI(4)P
- Phosphatidylinositol 5-phosphate, also known as PtdIns5P or PI(5)P

Phosphatidylinositol bisphosphates:

- Phosphatidylinositol 3,4-bisphosphate, also known as PtdIns(3,4)P_{2} or PI(3,4)P_{2}
- Phosphatidylinositol 3,5-bisphosphate, also known as PtdIns(3,5)P_{2} or PI(3,5)P_{2}
- Phosphatidylinositol 4,5-bisphosphate, also known as PtdIns(4,5)P_{2}, PI(4,5)P_{2} or often simply referred to as PIP_{2}

Phosphatidylinositol trisphosphate:

- Phosphatidylinositol 3,4,5-trisphosphate, also known as PtdIns(3,4,5)P_{3} or PI(3,4,5)P_{3}

These phosphoinositides are also found in plant cells, with the exception of PIP_{3}.

== Biosynthesis ==
The synthesis of phosphatidylinositol (PI) is limited to the endoplasmic reticulum (ER), which is the largest membrane component of the cell. This site also contributes the synthesis to the majority of phospholipids, namely phosphatidylcholine (PC), phosphatidylethanolamine (PE), phosphatidylserine (PS) and triacylglycerol (TG). The synthesis involves a series of enzymatic reactions.

De novo synthesis of PI starts with an acylation process of glyceraldehyde 3-phosphate (G-3-P) by GPAT enzymes at the sn-1 acyl chain position. The process is then followed by a second acylation with LPAAT enzymes (AGPAT1, AGPAT2 and AGPAT3), at the sn-2 acyl chain position. This double step process acylates G-3-P to phosphatidic acid (PA).

PA is converted into the intermediate CDP-diacylglycerol (CDP-DAG) by an enzyme called CDP-diacylglycerol synthase. Two genes, CDS1 and CDS2, encode different isoforms of CDP-diacylglycerol synthase. In the final enzymatic process, CDP-DAG and inositol are used as substrates by the enzyme phosphatidylinositol synthase and converted into PI and cytidine monophosphate (CMP).

== Metabolism ==
Important reactions involving phosphatidylinositol include the hydrolysis of PIP_{2} into inositol triphosphate and diacylglycerol by phospholipase C and phosphorylation of PIP_{2} into PIP_{3} by class I phosphotidylinositol-3-kinases. However, the metabolism of phosphatidylinositol is complex, with a multitude of lipid kinases, phosphatases and phospholipases potentially involved—for example, PIP_{3} can also be generated from phosphotidylinositol(3,4)-bisphosphate by type 1α phosphatidylinositol-4-phosphate 5-kinase under conditions of oxidative stress.

=== Hydrolysis ===
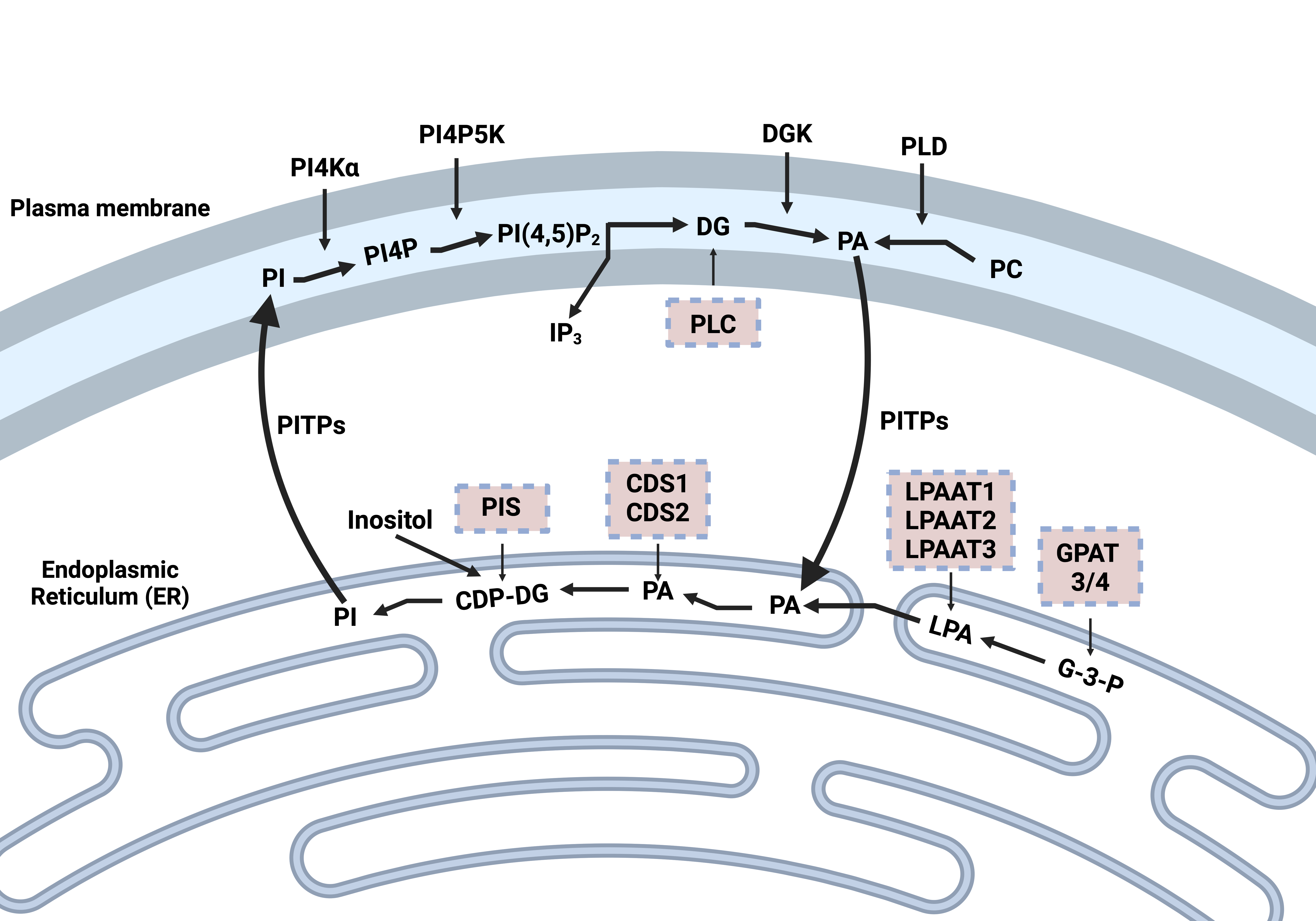
The process of hydrolysis and biosynthesis of PI separated between the plasma membrane and endoplasmic reticulum (ER), depicting respective enzymatic processes and reactions.

The significance of phosphatidylinositol (PI) metabolism lies in its role as a potential transducing mechanism, evident from studies showing hormone and neurotransmitter-induced hydrolysis of PI. The hydrolysis starts with the enzyme PI 4-kinase alpha (PI4Kα) converting PI into PI 4-phosphate (PI4P), which is then converted into PI (4,5) biphosphate (PI(4,5)P_{2} or PIP_{2}) by the enzyme PI 4-phosphate-5-kinase (PI4P5K). PI(4,5)P_{2} is then hydrolysed by phospholipase C (PLC) to form the second messengers inositol (1,4,5) triphosphate (IP_{3}) and diacylglycerol (DG). DG is then phosphorylated to phosphatidic acid (PA) by DG kinase (DGK). PA is also directly produced from phosphatidylcholine (PC) by phospholipase D (PLD). Lipid transfer proteins facilitate the exchange of PI and PA between membranes, ensuring its availability for receptor mechanisms on the plasma membrane, even in organelles like mitochondria incapable of PI synthesis.

=== Phosphorylation ===
The phosphorylation of PI mainly occurs on the cytosolic-facing surface of cellular membranes by cytoplasmic or peripheral membrane kinases. These phosphate groups can be removed by specific lipid phosphatases. Rare PI derivatives, such as PI(3,4,5)P_{3} or PIP_{3}, are produced transiently in response to growth factor signaling and play important roles in cancer biology when they are dysregulated. Diseases that can be caused by congenital defects in the phosphorylation of phosphotidylinositol include Charcot-Marie-Tooth disease, Lowe's syndrome and certain ciliopathies.
