= Phosphatidylinositol 4,5-bisphosphate =

Names
- IUPAC name 1,2-Diacyl-sn-glycero-3-phospho-(1-D-myo-inositol 4,5-bisphosphate)

Identifiers
CAS Number	245126-95-8
3D model (JSmol)	Interactive image
ChemSpider	21169207
PubChem CID	24742074
UNII	5B7FUW76X2
CompTox Dashboard (EPA)	DTXSID10420578
- InChI: InChI=1S/C47H85O19P3/c1-3-5-7-9-11-13-15-17-19-20-22-24-26-28-30-32-34-36-41(49)63-39(37-61-40(48)35-33-31-29-27-25-23-21-18-16-14-12-10-8-6-4-2)38-62-69(59,60)66-45-42(50)43(51)46(64-67(53,54)55)47(44(45)52)65-68(56,57)58/h11,13,17,19,22,24,28,30,39,42-47,50-52H,3-10,12,14-16,18,20-21,23,25-27,29,31-38H2,1-2H3,(H,59,60)(H2,53,54,55)(H2,56,57,58)/p-5/b13-11-,19-17-,24-22-,30-28-/t39?,42-,43+,44+,45-,46-,47-/m1/s1 Key: CNWINRVXAYPOMW-WJUYXORRSA-I; InChI=1/C47H85O19P3/c1-3-5-7-9-11-13-15-17-19-20-22-24-26-28-30-32-34-36-41(49)63-39(37-61-40(48)35-33-31-29-27-25-23-21-18-16-14-12-10-8-6-4-2)38-62-69(59,60)66-45-42(50)43(51)46(64-67(53,54)55)47(44(45)52)65-68(56,57)58/h11,13,17,19,22,24,28,30,39,42-47,50-52H,3-10,12,14-16,18,20-21,23,25-27,29,31-38H2,1-2H3,(H,59,60)(H2,53,54,55)(H2,56,57,58)/p-5/b13-11-,19-17-,24-22-,30-28-/t39?,42-,43+,44+,45-,46-,47-/m1/s1 Key: CNWINRVXAYPOMW-XHXVUCGABS
- SMILES: O=P([O-])([O-])O[C@@H]1[C@@H](O)[C@H](OP([O-])(=O)OCC(COC(=O)CCCCCCCCCCCCCCCCC)OC(=O)CCC/C=C\C/C=C\C/C=C\C/C=C\CCCCC)[C@H](O)[C@H](O)[C@H]1OP([O-])([O-])=O

Properties
Chemical formula	C_{47}H_{80}O_{19}P_{3}
Molar mass	1042.05 g/mol
- Except where otherwise noted, data are given for materials in their standard state (at 25 °C [77 °F], 100 kPa). verify (what is ?) Infobox references

Phosphatidylinositol 4,5-bisphosphate or PtdIns(4,5)P_{2}, also known simply as PIP_{2} or PI(4,5)P_{2}, is a minor phospholipid component of cell membranes. PtdIns(4,5)P_{2} is enriched at the plasma membrane where it is a substrate for a number of important signaling proteins. PIP_{2} also forms lipid clusters that sort proteins.

PIP_{2} is formed primarily by the type I phosphatidylinositol 4-phosphate 5-kinases from PI(4)P. In animals, PIP_{2} can also be formed by type II phosphatidylinositol 5-phosphate 4-kinases from PI(5)P.

The fatty acids of PIP_{2} are variable in different species and tissues, but the most common fatty acids are stearic in position 1 and arachidonic in 2.

== Signaling pathways ==
PIP_{2} is a part of many cellular signaling pathways, including PIP_{2} cycle, PI3K signalling, and PI5P metabolism. Recently, it has been found in the nucleus with unknown function.

== Functions ==
=== Cytoskeleton dynamics near membranes ===
PIP_{2} regulates the organization, polymerization, and branching of filamentous actin (F-actin) via direct binding to F-actin regulatory proteins.

=== Endocytosis and exocytosis ===
The first evidence that indicated phosphoinositides(PIs) (especially PI(4,5)P2) are important during the exocytosis process was in 1990. Emberhard et al. found that the application of PI-specific phospholipase C into digitonin-permeabilized chromaffin cells decreased PI levels, and inhibited calcium-triggered exocytosis. This exocytosis inhibition was preferential for an ATP-dependent stage, indicating PI function was required for secretion. Later studies identified associated proteins necessary during this stage, such as phosphatidylinositol transfer protein , and phosphoinositol-4-monophosphatase 5 kinase type Iγ (PIPKγ) , which mediates PI(4,5)P2 restoration in permeable cell incubation in an ATP-dependent way. In these later studies, PI(4,5)P2 specific antibodies strongly inhibited exocytosis, thus providing direct evidence that PI(4,5)P2 plays a pivotal role during the LDCV (Large dense core vesicle) exocytosis process.

Through the use of PI-specific kinase/phosphatase identification and PI antibody/drug/blocker discovery, the role of PI (especially PI(4,5)P2) in secretion regulation was extensively investigated. Studies utilizing PHPLCδ1 domain over-expression (acting as PI(4,5)P2 buffer or blocker) , PIPKIγ knockout in chromaffin cell and in central nerve system, PIPKIγ knockdown in beta cell lines, and over-expression of membrane-tethered inositol 5-phosphatase domain of synaptojanin 1, all suggested vesicle (synaptic vesicle and LDCV) secretion were severely impaired after PI(4,5)P2 depletion or blockage. Moreover, some studies showed an impaired/reduced RRP of those vesicles, though the docked vesicle number were not altered after PI(4,5)P2 depletion, indicating a defect at a pre-fusion stage (priming stage). Follow-up studies indicated that PI(4,5)P2 interactions with CAPS, Munc13 and synaptotagmin1 are likely to play a role in this PI(4,5)P2 dependent priming defect.

=== IP_{3}/DAG pathway ===
PIP_{2} functions as an intermediate in the IP_{3}/DAG pathway, which is initiated by ligands binding to G protein-coupled receptors activating the G_{q} alpha subunit. PtdIns(4,5)P_{2} is a substrate for hydrolysis by phospholipase C (PLC), a membrane-bound enzyme activated through protein receptors such as α1 adrenergic receptors. PIP_{2} regulates the function of many membrane proteins and ion channels, such as the M-channel. The products of the PLC catalyzation of PIP_{2} are inositol 1,4,5-trisphosphate (InsP_{3}; IP_{3}) and diacylglycerol (DAG), both of which function as second messengers. In this cascade, DAG remains on the cell membrane and activates the signal cascade by activating protein kinase C (PKC). PKC in turn activates other cytosolic proteins by phosphorylating them. The effect of PKC could be reversed by phosphatases. IP_{3} enters the cytoplasm and activates IP_{3} receptors on the smooth endoplasmic reticulum (ER), which opens calcium channels on the smooth ER, allowing mobilization of calcium ions through specific Ca^{2+} channels into the cytosol. Calcium participates in the cascade by activating other proteins.

=== Docking phospholipids ===
Class I PI 3-kinases phosphorylate PtdIns(4,5)P_{2} forming phosphatidylinositol (3,4,5)-trisphosphate (PtdIns(3,4,5)P_{3}) and PtdIns(4,5)P_{2} can be converted from PtdIns4P. PtdIns4P, PtdIns(3,4,5)P_{3} and PtdIns(4,5)P_{2} not only act as substrates for enzymes but also serve as docking phospholipids that bind specific domains that promote the recruitment of proteins to the plasma membrane and subsequent activation of signaling cascades.

- Examples of proteins activated by PtdIns(3,4,5)P_{3} are Akt, PDPK1, Btk1.
- One mechanism for direct effect of PtdIns(4,5)P_{2} is opening of Na^{+} channels as a minor function in growth hormone release by growth hormone-releasing hormone.

=== Potassium channels ===
Inwardly rectifying potassium channels have been shown to require docking of PIP_{2} for channel activity.

=== G protein-coupled receptors ===
PtdIns(4,5)P_{2} has been shown to stabilize the active states of Class A G protein-coupled receptors (GPCRs) via direct binding, and enhance their selectivity toward certain G proteins.

=== G protein-coupled receptor kinases ===
PIP_{2} has been shown to recruit G protein-coupled receptor kinase 2 (GRK2) to the membrane by binding to the large lobe of GRK2. This stabilizes GRK2 and also orients it in a way that allows for more efficient phosphorylation of the beta adrenergic receptor, a type of GPCR.

=== Regulation ===
PIP_{2} is regulated by many different components. One emerging hypothesis is that PIP_{2} concentration is maintained locally. Some of the factors involved in PIP_{2} regulation are:

- Lipid kinases, Lipid Phosphatase
- Lipid Transfer Proteins
- Growth Factors, Small GTPases
- Cell Attachment
- Cell-Cell Interaction
- Change in cell volume
- Cell differentiation state
- Cell stress
