= Phosphatidylinositol 4-phosphate =

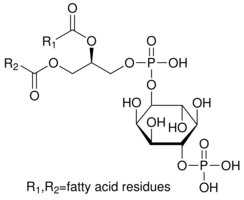
Structure of phosphatidylinositol-4-phosphate.

Phosphatidylinositol-4-phosphate (PtdIns4P, PI-4-P, PI4P, or PIP) is a precursor of phosphatidylinositol (4,5)-bisphosphate. PtdIns4P is prevalent in the membrane of the Golgi apparatus.

In the Golgi apparatus, PtdIns4P binds to the GTP-binding protein ARF and to effector proteins, including four-phosphate-adaptor protein 1 and 2 (PLEKHA3 and PLEKHA8). This three molecule complex recruits proteins that need to be carried to the cell membrane.

There is now evidence that PI-4-P is capable of deforming lipid systems into tightly curved assemblies, this is consistent with similar behaviour observed in phosphatidylinositol.

== See also ==
- Phosphatidylinositol 3-phosphate
- Phosphatidylinositol 5-phosphate
- Phosphatidylinositol (3,4,5)-trisphosphate
