= P84 =

P84 may refer to:

- HMAS Aitape (P 84), a patrol boat of the Royal Australian Navy
- Hunting-Percival P.84 Jet Provost, a British trainer aircraft
- p87^{PIKAP}, phosphoinositide-3-kinase adapter protein of 87 kDa
- Papyrus 84, a biblical manuscript
- Polyimide P84
- Republic XP-84 Thunderjet, an American turbojet fighter-bomber
- P84, a state regional road in Latvia
