= Edward Anderson (chemist) =

British chemist

Ed Anderson
- Born: Edward Alexander Anderson; 1 May 1975 (age 51); Leicester, England

Academic background
- Education: Magdalen College, Oxford; Gonville and Caius College, Cambridge
- Doctoral advisor: Andrew Holmes
- Other advisor: Harry Anderson

Academic work
- Discipline: Chemistry
- Sub-discipline: Organic chemistry
- Institutions: Jesus College, Oxford

Edward Alexander Anderson, known as Ed Anderson, is an organic chemist based at the University of Oxford. In 2016, the university awarded him the title of Professor of Organic Chemistry.

== Life ==
Ed Anderson attended Magdalen College, Oxford, and graduated from the university with Bachelor of Arts degree in chemistry in 1997, having completed his research project on gold nanoparticles under the supervision of Harry Anderson. Between 1997 and 2001, he completed a doctorate at Gonville and Caius College in the University of Cambridge under the supervision of Andrew Holmes. His research focused on the applications and synthesis of medium-ring lactones and ethers. He took up a two-year post-doctoral research position assisting Erik J. Sorensen at The Scripps Research Institute and helped to synthesise the furanosteroid viridin. In 2003, he was appointed a Junior Research Fellow at Homerton College, Cambridge, and then took up an EPSRC Advanced Research Fellowship at Oxford in 2007, moving over to Jesus College two years later as a lecturer, and subsequently a fellow and tutor. In 2016, the university awarded him with the title Professor of Organic Chemistry. In 2020, he was awarded the Bader Award by the Royal Society of Chemistry.

According to his Oxford University profile, Anderson's research has "a particular focus on the total synthesis of biologically active molecules, and the development of new reactions including cascade processes ... Within the theme of reaction development, we have particular interests in the use of metal-mediated reactions to rapidly construct complex functional molecules, and in new applications of organosilicon chemistry."

Anderson is married to Emma, a virologist at the University of Warwick, and they have two children.
