= Class I PI 3-kinases =

Group of enzymes

Class I PI 3-kinases are a subgroup of the enzyme family, phosphoinositide 3-kinase that possess a common protein domain structure, substrate specificity, and method of activation. Class I PI 3-kinases are further divided into two subclasses, class IA PI 3-kinases and class IB PI 3-kinases.

== Class IA PI 3-kinases ==
Class IA PI 3-kinases are activated by receptor tyrosine kinases (RTKs).

There are three catalytic subunits that are classified as class IA PI 3-kinases:

- p110α
- p110β
- p110δ

There are currently five regulatory subunits that are known to associate with class IA PI 3-kinases catalytic subunits:

- p85α and p85β
- p55α and p55γ
- p50α

== Class IB PI 3-kinases ==
Class IB PI 3-kinases are activated by G-protein-coupled receptors (GPCRs).

The only known class IB PI 3-kinase catalytic subunit is p110γ.

There are two known regulatory subunits for p110γ:

- p101
- p84/ p87PIKAP.

== See also ==
- Phosphoinositide 3-kinase#Class I
- Phosphoinositide 3-kinase inhibitor
