= LY294002 =

Names
- Preferred IUPAC name 2-(Morpholin-4-yl)-8-phenyl-4H-1-benzopyran-4-one
- Other names 2-(4-Morpholinyl)-8-phenyl-4H-1-benzopyran-4-one

Identifiers
CAS Number	154447-36-6
3D model (JSmol)	Interactive image
ChEMBL	ChEMBL98350
ChemSpider	3835
IUPHAR/BPS	6004
PubChem CID	3973
UNII	31M2U1DVID
CompTox Dashboard (EPA)	DTXSID6042650
- InChI: InChI=1S/C19H17NO3/c21-17-13-18(20-9-11-22-12-10-20)23-19-15(7-4-8-16(17)19)14-5-2-1-3-6-14/h1-8,13H,9-12H2 Key: CZQHHVNHHHRRDU-UHFFFAOYSA-N; InChI=1/C19H17NO3/c21-17-13-18(20-9-11-22-12-10-20)23-19-15(7-4-8-16(17)19)14-5-2-1-3-6-14/h1-8,13H,9-12H2 Key: CZQHHVNHHHRRDU-UHFFFAOYAM
- SMILES: C1COCCN1C2=CC(=O)C3=C(O2)C(=CC=C3)C4=CC=CC=C4

Properties
Chemical formula	C_{19}H_{17}NO_{3}
Molar mass	307.349 g·mol^{−1}
- Except where otherwise noted, data are given for materials in their standard state (at 25 °C [77 °F], 100 kPa). verify (what is ?) Infobox references

LY294002 is a morpholine-containing chemical compound that is a potent inhibitor of numerous proteins, and a strong inhibitor of phosphoinositide 3-kinases (PI3Ks). It is generally considered a non-selective research tool, and should not be used for experiments aiming to target PI3K uniquely.

Two of these are the proto-oncogene serine/threonine-protein kinase (PIM1) and the phosphatidylinositol-4,5-bisphosphate 3-kinase catalytic subunit gamma isoform. With an IC_{50} of 1.4 μM it is somewhat less potent than wortmannin, another well-known PI3 kinase inhibitor. However, LY294002 is a reversible inhibitor of PI3K whereas wortmannin acts irreversibly.

Application of LY294002 causes a substantial acceleration of MEPP frequency (150 μM) at the frog neuromuscular junction through a mechanism that is independent of intraterminal calcium. LY294002 causes the release of MEPPs through a perturbation of synaptotagmin function.

LY294002 is also a BET inhibitor (e.g. of BRD2, BRD3, and BRD4).

== Application ==
=== Research ===
It has been shown that LY294002 administration has an additive effect on quercetin antiviral activity against hepatitis C virus.
