= Viridin =

Chemical compound: furanosteroid

Names
- Preferred IUPAC name (1S,2S,11bR)-1-Hydroxy-2-methoxy-11b-methyl-1,7,8,11b-tetrahydrocyclopenta[7,8]phenanthro[10,1-bc]furan-3,6,9(2H)-trione

Identifiers
CAS Number	3306-52-3
3D model (JSmol)	Interactive image
ChEMBL	ChEMBL2158159
ChemSpider	85065
ECHA InfoCard	100.019.989
EC Number	221-987-6
PubChem CID	94257
UNII	X5KJO207MO
CompTox Dashboard (EPA)	DTXSID00889372
- InChI: InChI=1S/C20H16O6/c1-20-11-5-3-8-9(4-6-12(8)21)13(11)16(23)17-14(20)10(7-26-17)15(22)18(25-2)19(20)24/h3,5,7,18-19,24H,4,6H2,1-2H3/t18-,19-,20-/m1/s1 Key: YEIGUXGHHKAURB-VAMGGRTRSA-N
- SMILES: C[C@]12[C@@H]([C@@H](C(=O)C3=COC(=C31)C(=O)C4=C2C=CC5=C4CCC5=O)OC)O

Properties
Chemical formula	C_{20}H_{16}O_{6}
Molar mass	352.337 g mol^{−1}
- Except where otherwise noted, data are given for materials in their standard state (at 25 °C [77 °F], 100 kPa). (what is ?) Infobox references

Viridin is an antifungal metabolite of Gliocladium virens that was first reported in 1945. Belonging to a class of molecules known as furanosteroids, it has a characteristic highly strained electrophilic furan ring fused between C-4 and C-6 of the steroid framework. Members of this family, including wortmannin, are known to be potent, irreversible covalent inhibitors of phosphoinositide 3-kinases (PI3Ks).

== Biosynthesis ==
The complete biosynthesis of viridin is not known. Through [2-^{14}C]mevalonic acid labeling studies, it has been shown that viridin is biosynthesized from a triterpenoid pathway, which starts from squalene, rather than a diterpenoid pathway. Incorporation of lanosterol into viridin has been described. Although the mechanisms and order of the remaining steps from lanosterol to viridin are not certain, these include the formation of the furan ring, the loss of C-13 and C-14 methyl groups, aromatization of the C-ring, removal of the side chain, and oxidation of the A-ring. Some of these steps may be analogous to pathways of other steroids. Loss of a hydrogen atom from C-15 during removal of the C-14 methyl group suggests a pathway similar to that of other steroid biosyntheses. Analogous to the cholesterol pathway, the C-14 methyl group is lost as formic acid by action of sterol 14-demethylase. Though the C-13 methyl group isn't removed in the pathway of aldosterone, it is possible that viridin undergoes analogous oxidation at C-18 followed by loss of formic acid or decarboxylation to remove the C-13 methyl. Removal of the side chain has been shown to follow a mammalian pathway. It likely follows the pathway of androstenedione and oxidatively removes the side chain as acetic acid, resulting in a ketone on the D-ring. The “extra” carbon in the furan ring at C-4 comes from the 3’-position of mevalonic acid and represents the C-4β-methyl group of lanosterol. Oxidation and decarboxylation of the C-4α-methyl group is consistent with the normal mammalian steroid pathway; however, instead of repeating these steps to remove the other methyl group, the second oxidized methyl group is likely intercepted to form the furan ring by an unknown mechanism. Studies show that aromatization of the C-ring proceeds without skeletal rearrangement.

In the biosynthesis of viridiol by Gliocladium deliquescens, the 3β-OH reduced form of viridin, the incorporation of squalene, lanosterol, dehydroxydemethoxyviridin, and demethoxyviridin was reported. This suggests that the vicinal oxygenations at C-1 and C-2 are independent steps involving hydroxylation.

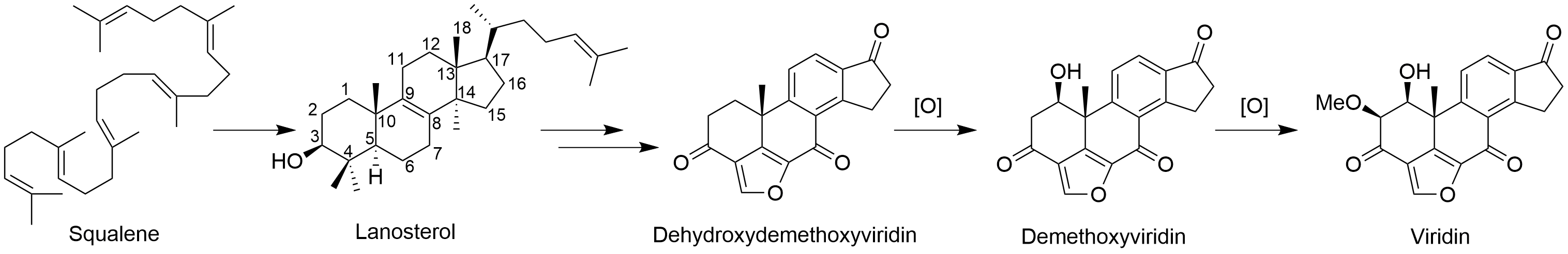

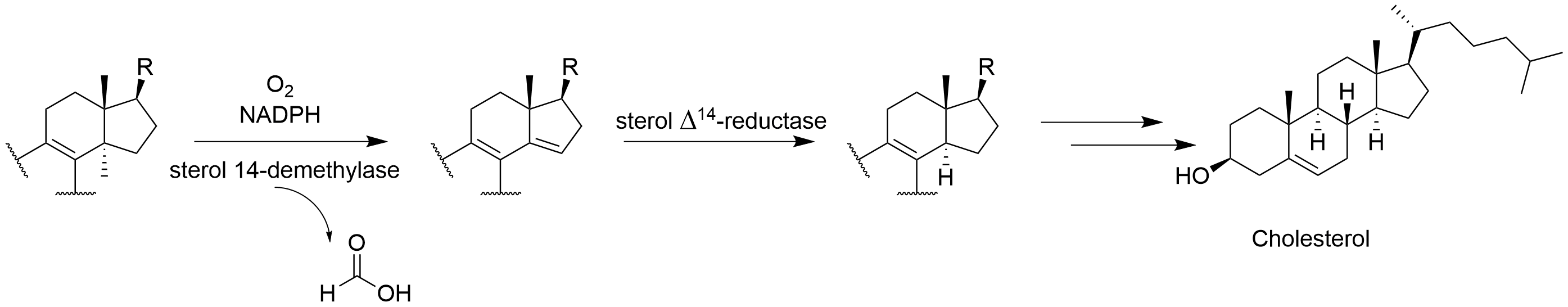
Removal of C-14 methyl

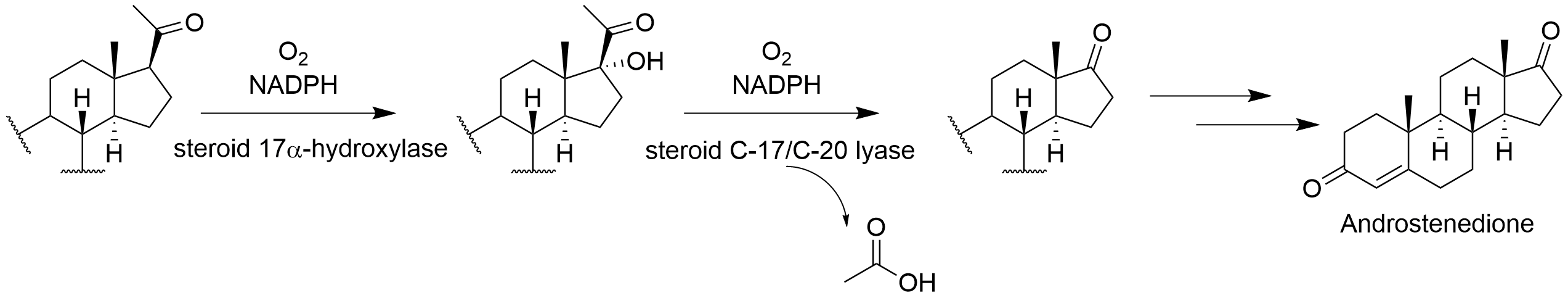
Oxidative removal of side chain

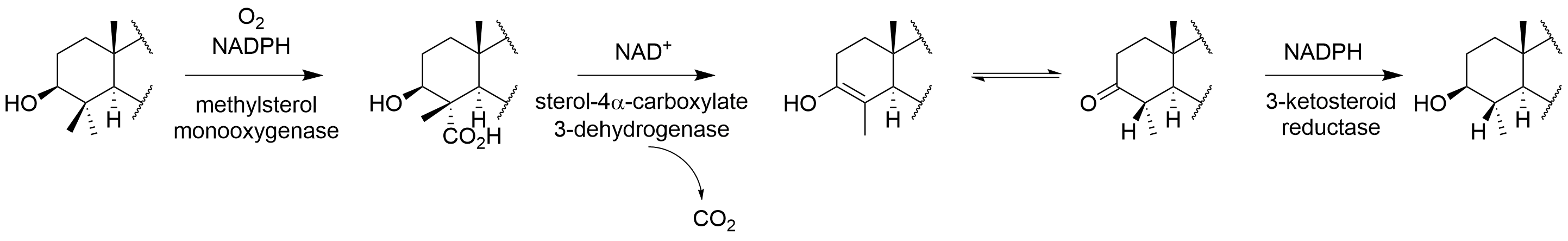
Removal of C-4 methyl
