= PIK3C3 =

Protein-coding gene in the species Homo sapiens

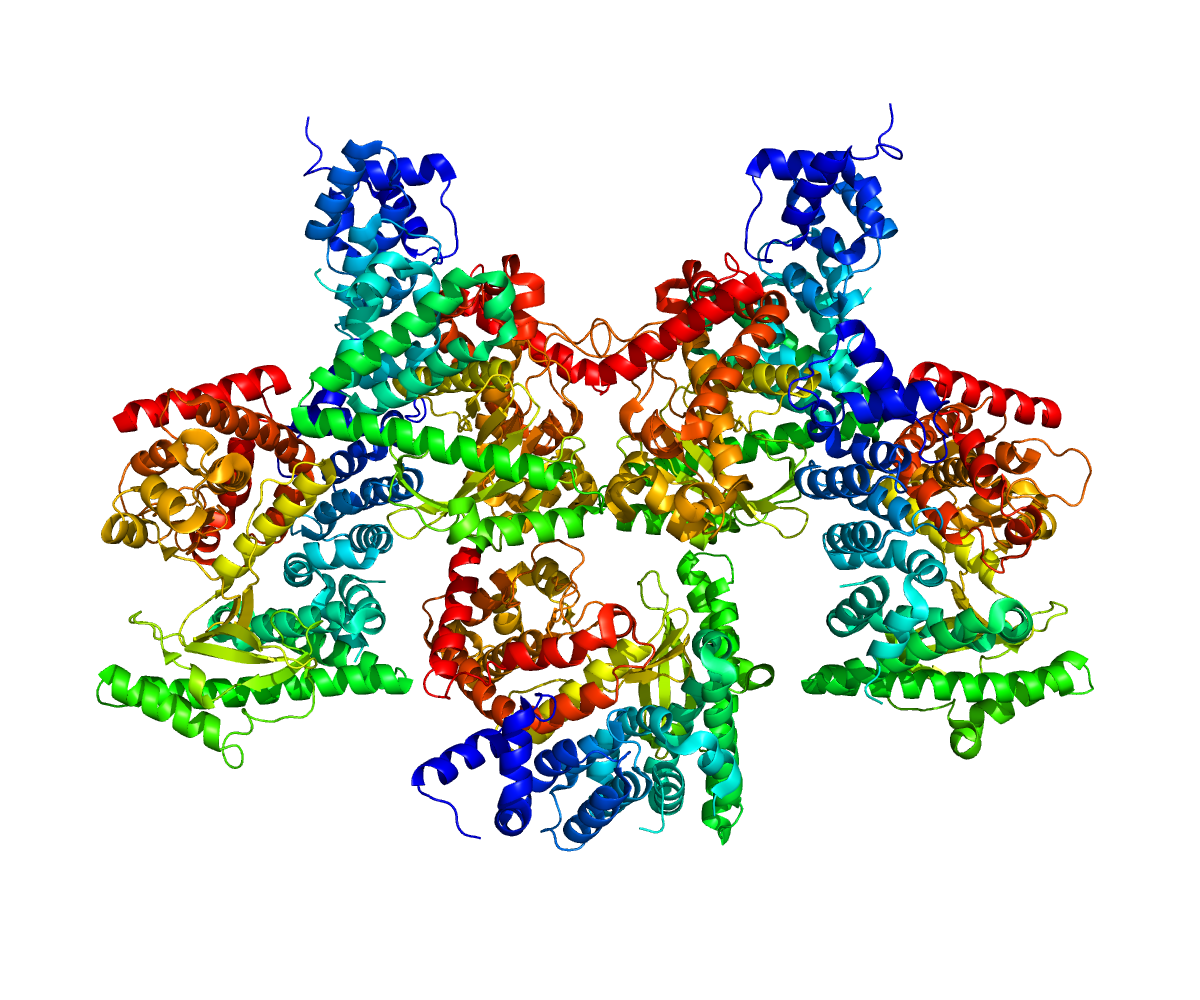

Identifiers
- Aliases: PIK3C3, VPS34, hVps34, phosphatidylinositol 3-kinase catalytic subunit type 3
- External IDs: OMIM: 602609; MGI: 2445019; GeneCards: PIK3C3
Available structures
| PDB | Ortholog search: PDBe RCSB |
| PDB | List of PDB id codes 3IHY, 3LS8, 4OYS, 4PH4, 4UWF, 4UWG, 4UWH, 4UWL, 5ANL |
Enzyme activity
| EC # | BRENDA | ExPASy | KEGG | MetaCyc |
|---|---|---|---|---|
| 2.7.1.137 | ↗ | ↗ | ↗ | ↗ |

Gene location (Human)
| Chr. | Chromosome 18 (human) |
| Band | 18q12.3 | Start | 41,955,234 bp |
| Band | 18q12.3 | End | 42,087,830 bp |

Gene location (Mouse)
| Chr. | Chromosome 18 (mouse) |
| Band | 18|18 B1 | Start | 30,405,800 bp |
| Band | 18|18 B1 | End | 30,481,179 bp |
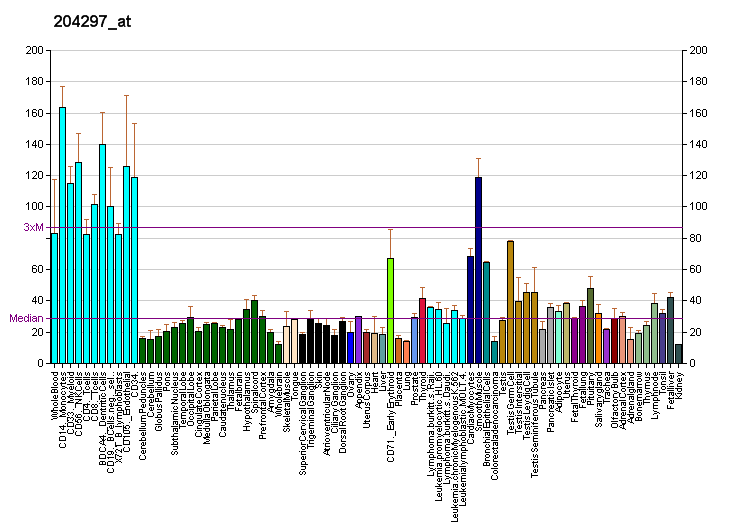
RNA expression pattern
| Bgee | Human / Mouse (ortholog); Top expressed in: Achilles tendon; ventricular zone; endothelial cell; stromal cell of endometrium; ganglionic eminence; testicle; gonad; right adrenal cortex; right testis; left testis / Top expressed in: lesser wing of sphenoid bone; occiput; occipital bone; Meckel's cartilage; rib; parotid gland; epithelium of stomach; submandibular gland; granulocyte; Gonadal ridge; More reference expression data |
| BioGPS | More reference expression data |
Gene ontology
| Molecular function | transferase activity; protein kinase activity; nucleotide binding; 1-phosphatidylinositol-3-kinase activity; protein binding; phosphatidylinositol 3-kinase activity; ATP binding; kinase activity |
| Cellular component | cytosol; endosome; late endosome; phagocytic vesicle membrane; membrane; phosphatidylinositol 3-kinase complex, class III; autophagosome; midbody; phagocytic vesicle; axoneme; cytoplasmic vesicle; autolysosome; phagophore assembly site; peroxisome; phosphatidylinositol 3-kinase complex, class III, type I; phosphatidylinositol 3-kinase complex, class III, type II; cytoplasm; intracellular anatomical structure |
| Biological process | cellular response to glucose starvation; regulation of cytokinesis; phosphorylation; protein processing; response to leucine; cytokinesis; endosome organization; cell division; phosphatidylinositol-3-phosphate biosynthetic process; phosphatidylinositol phosphate biosynthetic process; early endosome to late endosome transport; phosphatidylinositol biosynthetic process; cell cycle; toll-like receptor 9 signaling pathway; macroautophagy; regulation of protein secretion; protein localization to phagophore assembly site; cellular response to starvation; protein lipidation; autophagy; autophagosome assembly; protein phosphorylation; endocytosis; autophagy of peroxisome; phosphatidylinositol-mediated signaling; interleukin-7-mediated signaling pathway |
Sources:Amigo / QuickGO
Orthologs
| Databases | NCBI: entry; OMA: entry |
| Species | Human | Mouse |
| Entrez | 5289 | 225326 |
| Ensembl | ENSG00000078142 | ENSMUSG00000033628 |
| UniProt | Q8NEB9 | Q6PF93 |
| RefSeq (mRNA) | NM_001308020; NM_002647 | NM_181414 |
| RefSeq (protein) | NP_001294949; NP_002638 | NP_852079 |
| Location (UCSC) | Chr 18: 41.96 – 42.09 Mb | Chr 18: 30.41 – 30.48 Mb |
| PubMed search |
- Wikidata
| View/Edit Human | View/Edit Mouse |

Phosphatidylinositol 3-kinase catalytic subunit type 3 is an enzyme subunit that in humans is encoded by the PIK3C3 gene. It's a class III phosphoinositide 3-kinase.

== Gene ==
The human PIK3C3 gene is located on chromosome 18 at 18q12.3 and encodes Vps34, the catalytic component of class III phosphoinositide 3-kinase complexes.

== Structure ==
Vps34 contains an N-terminal C2 domain, a central helical (PIK accessory) domain, and a C-terminal catalytic lipid kinase domain.

Vps34 forms two major complexes, both containing the regulatory subunit Vps15/p150 and Beclin 1. Complex I additionally contains ATG14, whereas complex II contains UVRAG instead.

== Function ==
Vps34 phosphorylates phosphatidylinositol to produce phosphatidylinositol 3-phosphate (PI3P). This lipid recruits proteins involved in autophagy and intracellular membrane trafficking. Complex I promotes the initiation of autophagosome formation, while complex II regulates endosomal protein trafficking and contributes to later stages of autophagy.

Rab5 recruits and activates Vps34 complex II at early endosomes. The complex also functions in Rab7-positive late endosomes, helping to regulate endosomal trafficking. Vps34 complex II also contributes to phagosome maturation following phagocytosis, producing PI3P that supports membrane trafficking and fusion with lysosomes.

== Clinical significance ==
Vps34 is being investigated as a target for cancer therapy because of its roles in autophagy and tumor-cell responses to stress. Selective inhibitors also show potential for use in cancer immunotherapy. In preclinical models, Vps34 inhibition promotes an inflamed tumor microenvironment and enhances the efficacy of checkpoint inhibitor antibodies targeting PD-1 or PD-L1.

== Discovery ==
Vps34 was initially identified in Saccharomyces cerevisiae through genetic screens for defects in vacuolar protein sorting, from which its name derives.
