= PIK3C2B =

Protein-coding gene in humans

Identifiers
- Aliases: PIK3C2B, C2-PI3K, phosphatidylinositol-4-phosphate 3-kinase catalytic subunit type 2 beta
- External IDs: OMIM: 602838; MGI: 2685045; GeneCards: PIK3C2B
Enzyme activity
EC #	BRENDA	ExPASy	KEGG	MetaCyc
2.7.1.137	↗	↗	↗	↗
2.7.1.154	↗	↗	↗	↗

Gene location (Human)
Chr.	Chromosome 1 (human)
Band	1q32.1	Start	204,422,628 bp
Band	1q32.1	End	204,494,805 bp

Gene location (Mouse)
Chr.	Chromosome 1 (mouse)
Band	1|1 E4	Start	132,973,405 bp
Band	1|1 E4	End	133,036,425 bp
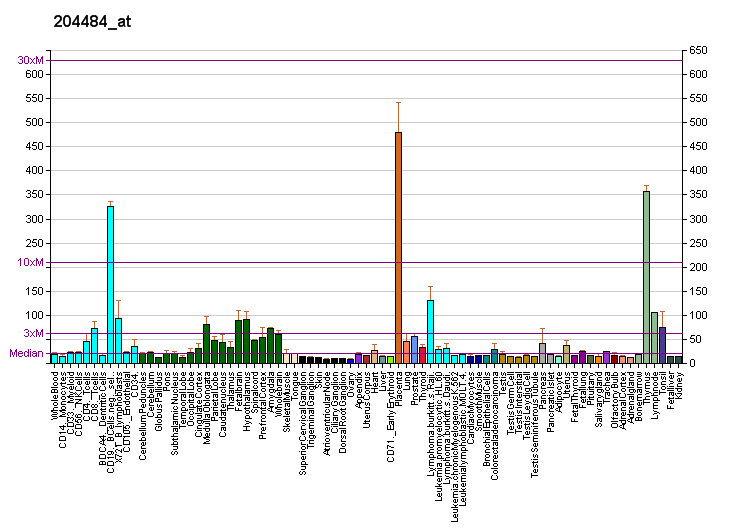
RNA expression pattern
Bgee	Human / Mouse (ortholog); Top expressed in: pancreatic ductal cell; inferior ganglion of vagus nerve; gingival epithelium; pylorus; nipple; vena cava; ventral tegmental area; epithelium of nasopharynx; visceral pleura; superficial temporal artery / Top expressed in: zygote; secondary oocyte; primary oocyte; tail of embryo; skeletal muscle tissue; striatum of neuraxis; genital tubercle; heart; muscle of thigh; colon; More reference expression data
BioGPS	More reference expression data
Gene ontology
Molecular function	transferase activity; nucleotide binding; lipid kinase activity; 1-phosphatidylinositol-3-kinase activity; 1-phosphatidylinositol-4-phosphate 3-kinase activity; kinase activity; protein binding; phosphatidylinositol binding; ATP binding
Cellular component	phosphatidylinositol 3-kinase complex; membrane; intracellular membrane-bounded organelle; plasma membrane; endocytic vesicle; endoplasmic reticulum; nucleus; nucleoplasm; cytosol; cytoplasm
Biological process	protein kinase B signaling; phosphorylation; phosphatidylinositol phosphate biosynthetic process; phosphatidylinositol-mediated signaling; cellular response to starvation; phosphatidylinositol-3-phosphate biosynthetic process; autophagosome organization; macroautophagy; phosphatidylinositol 3-kinase signaling; cell migration; biological process; phosphatidylinositol biosynthetic process
Sources:Amigo / QuickGO
Orthologs
Databases	NCBI: entry; OMA: entry
Species	Human	Mouse
Entrez	5287	240752
Ensembl	ENSG00000133056	ENSMUSG00000026447
UniProt	O00750	n/a
RefSeq (mRNA)	NM_002646; NM_001377334; NM_001377335	NM_001099276
RefSeq (protein)	NP_002637; NP_001364263; NP_001364264	n/a
Location (UCSC)	Chr 1: 204.42 – 204.49 Mb	Chr 1: 132.97 – 133.04 Mb
PubMed search
- Wikidata
View/Edit Human	View/Edit Mouse

Phosphatidylinositol-4-phosphate 3-kinase C2 domain-containing beta polypeptide is an enzyme that in humans is encoded by the PIK3C2B gene.

== Function ==
The protein encoded by this gene belongs to the phosphoinositide 3-kinase (PI3K) family. PI3-kinases play roles in signaling pathways involved in cell proliferation, oncogenic transformation, cell survival, cell migration, and intracellular protein trafficking. This protein contains a lipid kinase catalytic domain as well as a C-terminal C2 domain, a characteristic of class II PI 3-kinases. C2 domains act as calcium-dependent phospholipid binding motifs that mediate translocation of proteins to membranes, and may also mediate protein-protein interactions. The PI3-kinase activity of this protein is sensitive to low nanomolar levels of the inhibitor wortmannin. The C2 domain of this protein was shown to bind phospholipids but not Ca^{2+}, which suggests that this enzyme may function in a calcium-independent manner.
