= KC6 =

KC6 ("Keratoconus gene 6") is a novel gene located on chromosome 18 at p12.3. It was discovered by Rabinowitz et al. (2005) in a study whose aims were finding genes expressed in human cornea and increasing the knowledge of molecular changes in keratoconus. It lies adjacent to the PIK3C3 gene, but is apparently non-protein coding. Its function is unknown so far and the only study available is that of its discovery. Authors suggest that the gene may be cornea-specific in its expression.
