= PIK3C2A =

Protein-coding gene in the species Homo sapiens

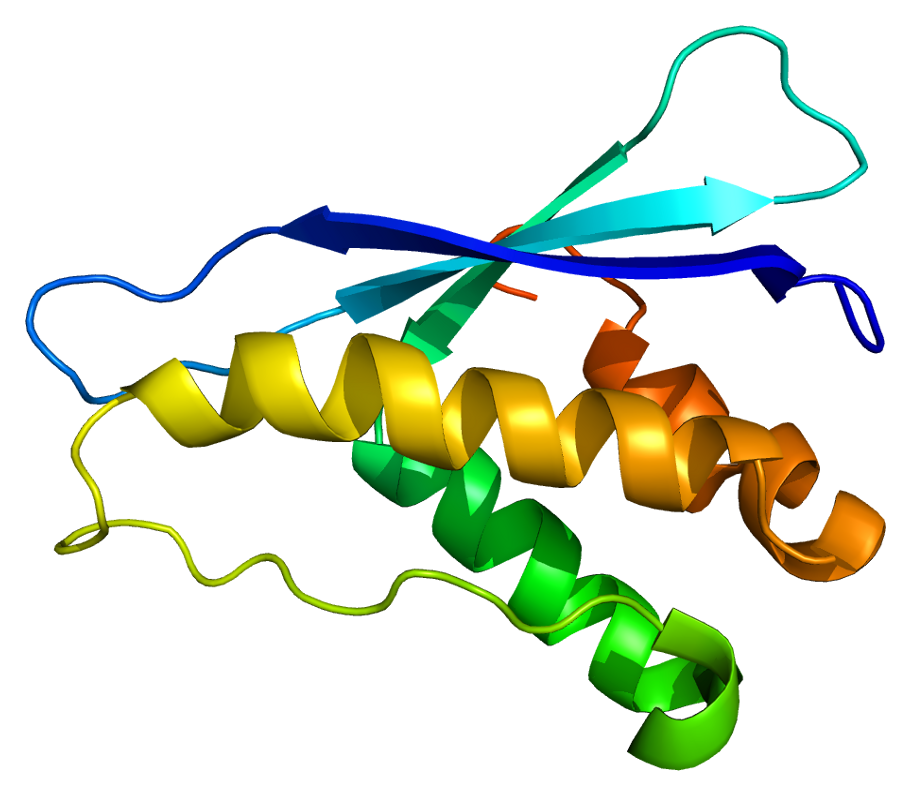

Identifiers
- Aliases: PIK3C2A, CPK, PI3-K-C2(ALPHA), PI3-K-C2A, PI3K-C2-alpha, PI3K-C2alpha, phosphatidylinositol-4-phosphate 3-kinase catalytic subunit type 2 alpha, OCSKD
- External IDs: OMIM: 603601; MGI: 1203729; GeneCards: PIK3C2A
Available structures
PDB	Ortholog search: PDBe RCSB
PDB	List of PDB id codes 2AR5, 2IWL, 2REA, 2RED
Enzyme activity
EC #	BRENDA	ExPASy	KEGG	MetaCyc
2.7.1.137	↗	↗	↗	↗
2.7.1.153	↗	↗	↗	↗
2.7.1.154	↗	↗	↗	↗

Gene location (Human)
Chr.	Chromosome 11 (human)
Band	11p15.1	Start	17,077,730 bp
Band	11p15.1	End	17,207,986 bp

Gene location (Mouse)
Chr.	Chromosome 7 (mouse)
Band	7 F1|7 61.62 cM	Start	115,936,500 bp
Band	7 F1|7 61.62 cM	End	116,042,684 bp
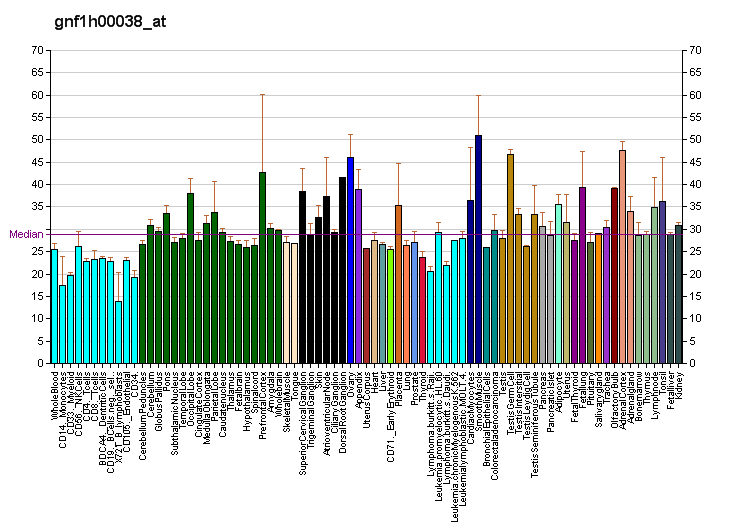
RNA expression pattern
Bgee	Human / Mouse (ortholog); Top expressed in: secondary oocyte; jejunal mucosa; superficial temporal artery; retinal pigment epithelium; caput epididymis; visceral pleura; corpus epididymis; lower lobe of lung; tail of epididymis; Epithelium of choroid plexus / Top expressed in: endothelial cell of lymphatic vessel; epithelium of lens; vestibular sensory epithelium; medullary collecting duct; seminal vesicula; Epithelium of choroid plexus; iris; tail of embryo; vas deferens; ciliary body; More reference expression data
BioGPS	More reference expression data
Gene ontology
Molecular function	transferase activity; nucleotide binding; 1-phosphatidylinositol-3-kinase activity; 1-phosphatidylinositol-4-phosphate 3-kinase activity; kinase activity; phosphatidylinositol binding; phosphatidylinositol 3-kinase activity; ATP binding
Cellular component	cytoplasm; vesicle; cytosol; phosphatidylinositol 3-kinase complex; Golgi apparatus; membrane; plasma membrane; extracellular exosome; cytoplasmic vesicle; clathrin-coated vesicle; nucleus
Biological process	insulin receptor signaling pathway; endocytosis; epidermal growth factor receptor signaling pathway; phosphorylation; phosphatidylinositol phosphate biosynthetic process; clathrin coat assembly; phosphatidylinositol biosynthetic process; platelet-derived growth factor receptor signaling pathway; phosphatidylinositol-mediated signaling; vascular associated smooth muscle contraction; exocytosis; phosphatidylinositol-3-phosphate biosynthetic process; membrane organization; phosphatidylinositol 3-kinase signaling; cell migration; positive regulation of cell migration involved in sprouting angiogenesis
Sources:Amigo / QuickGO
Orthologs
Databases	NCBI: entry; OMA: entry
Species	Human	Mouse
Entrez	5286	18704
Ensembl	ENSG00000011405	ENSMUSG00000030660
UniProt	O00443	Q61194
RefSeq (mRNA)	NM_002645; NM_001321378; NM_001321380; NM_001386870	NM_011083
RefSeq (protein)	NP_001308307; NP_001308309; NP_002636	NP_035213
Location (UCSC)	Chr 11: 17.08 – 17.21 Mb	Chr 7: 115.94 – 116.04 Mb
PubMed search
- Wikidata
View/Edit Human	View/Edit Mouse

Phosphatidylinositol-4-phosphate 3-kinase C2 domain-containing alpha polypeptide is an enzyme that in humans is encoded by the PIK3C2A gene.

The protein encoded by this gene belongs to the phosphoinositide 3-kinase (PI3K) family. PI3-kinases play roles in signaling pathways involved in cell proliferation, oncogenic transformation, cell survival, cell migration, and intracellular protein trafficking.

This protein contains a lipid kinase catalytic domain as well as a C-terminal C2 domain, a characteristic of Class II PI 3-kinases. C2 domains act as calcium-dependent phospholipid binding motifs that mediate translocation of proteins to membranes, and may also mediate protein-protein interactions. The PI3-kinase activity of this protein is not sensitive to nanomolar levels of the inhibitor wortmannin. This protein was shown to be able to be activated by insulin and may be involved in integrin-dependent signaling.

== Clinical significance ==
Three families have been reported with homozygous loss of function mutations in this gene. The clinical features of this syndrome include short stature, coarse facial features, cataracts with secondary glaucoma, multiple skeletal abnormalities and neurological manifestations. Abnormalities of cilial function were also noted.
