= ATG14 =

Human protein-coding gene

Identifiers
- Aliases: ATG14, ATG14L, BARKOR, KIAA0831, autophagy related 14
- External IDs: OMIM: 613515; MGI: 1261775; GeneCards: ATG14

Gene location (Human)
Chr.	Chromosome 14 (human)
Band	14q22.3	Start	55,366,391 bp
Band	14q22.3	End	55,411,830 bp

Gene location (Mouse)
Chr.	Chromosome 14 (mouse)
Band	14 C1|14 24.6 cM	Start	47,778,350 bp
Band	14 C1|14 24.6 cM	End	47,808,106 bp
RNA expression pattern
Bgee	Human / Mouse (ortholog); Top expressed in: secondary oocyte; glutes; skin of thigh; triceps brachii muscle; Skeletal muscle tissue of rectus abdominis; skin of hip; quadriceps femoris muscle; vastus lateralis muscle; deltoid muscle; biceps brachii / Top expressed in: morula; morula; zygote; secondary oocyte; blastocyst; primary oocyte; proximal tubule; right kidney; Gonadal ridge; muscle of thigh; More reference expression data
BioGPS	n/a
Gene ontology
Molecular function	protein binding; GTPase binding
Cellular component	cytosol; phagophore assembly site membrane; endoplasmic reticulum membrane; membrane; extrinsic component of omegasome membrane; extrinsic component of phagophore assembly site membrane; autophagosome; autophagosome membrane; endoplasmic reticulum; cytoplasmic vesicle; cytoplasm; axoneme; phosphatidylinositol 3-kinase complex, class III; mitochondria associated membranes; phagocytic vesicle
Biological process	regulation of protein phosphorylation; endosome to lysosome transport; cellular response to starvation; autophagosome assembly; positive regulation of phosphatidylinositol 3-kinase activity; autophagy; regulation of protein complex stability; posttranscriptional regulation of gene expression; macroautophagy; autophagosome membrane docking; mitophagy; response to mitochondrial depolarisation; negative regulation of protein phosphorylation; positive regulation of protein phosphorylation; cellular response to glucose starvation; regulation of triglyceride metabolic process
Sources:Amigo / QuickGO
Orthologs
Databases	NCBI: entry; OMA: entry
Species	Human	Mouse
Entrez	22863	100504663
Ensembl	ENSG00000126775	ENSMUSG00000037526
UniProt	Q6ZNE5	Q8CDJ3
RefSeq (mRNA)	NM_014924	NM_172599
RefSeq (protein)	NP_055739	NP_766187
Location (UCSC)	Chr 14: 55.37 – 55.41 Mb	Chr 14: 47.78 – 47.81 Mb
PubMed search
- Wikidata
View/Edit Human	View/Edit Mouse

Autophagy-related protein 14 (ATG14), also known as ATG14L or BARKOR, is a protein that in humans is encoded by the ATG14 gene. It participates in autophagy, the process by which cells deliver cellular material to lysosomes for degradation.

== Gene ==
The human ATG14 gene is located on chromosome 14 at 14q22.3.

== Structure ==
The protein contains N-terminal coiled-coil regions involved in formation of the autophagy-associated phosphatidylinositol 3-kinase complex. Its C-terminal Barkor/ATG14 autophagosome-targeting sequence (BATS) domain preferentially binds highly curved membranes containing phosphatidylinositol 3-phosphate.

== Function ==
ATG14 is an autophagy-specific component of the class III phosphatidylinositol 3-kinase complex I. It helps target the complex to sites of autophagosome formation. ATG14 also contributes to the subsequent fusion of autophagosomes with lysosomes.
