= P83 =

P83 may refer to:

- Bell XP-83, an American prototype fighter aircraft
- FB P-83 Wanad, a pistol
- BRM P83, a Formula One racing car
- HMAS Advance (P 83), a patrol boat of the Royal Australian Navy
- HMS Urtica (P83), a submarine of the Royal Navy
- INS Amindivi (P83), a corvette of the Indian Navy
- Papyrus 83, a biblical manuscript
- P83, a state regional road in Latvia
