= Sonolisib =

Clinical data
- Other names: PX-866

Legal status
- Legal status: Investigational

Identifiers
- IUPAC name: [(3aR,6E,9S,9aR,10R,11aS)-6-[[Bis(prop-2-enyl)amino]methylidene]-5-hydroxy-9-(methoxymethyl)-9a,11a-dimethyl-1,4,7-trioxo-2,3,3a,9,10,11-hexahydroindeno[4,5-h]isochromen-10-yl] acetate
- CAS Number: 502632-66-8
- PubChem CID: 9849735
- IUPHAR/BPS: 7941
- DrugBank: DB12601
- ChemSpider: 8025448
- ChEBI: CHEBI:65345
- ChEMBL: ChEMBL411907
- CompTox Dashboard (EPA): DTXSID80198257
- ECHA InfoCard: 100.243.047

Chemical and physical data
- Formula: C_{29}H_{35}NO_{8}
- Molar mass: 525.598 g·mol^{−1}
- 3D model (JSmol): Interactive image
- SMILES: CC(=O)O[C@@H]1C[C@]2([C@@H](CCC2=O)C3=C1[C@]4([C@H](OC(=O)/C(=C/N(CC=C)CC=C)/C4=C(C3=O)O)COC)C)C
- InChI: InChI=1S/C29H35NO8/c1-7-11-30(12-8-2)14-17-23-26(34)25(33)22-18-9-10-20(32)28(18,4)13-19(37-16(3)31)24(22)29(23,5)21(15-36-6)38-27(17)35/h7-8,14,18-19,21,34H,1-2,9-13,15H2,3-6H3/b17-14+/t18-,19+,21+,28-,29-/m0/s1; Key:QIUASFSNWYMDFS-NILGECQDSA-N

Sonolisib (PX-866) is a experimental drug that has been shown to be an irreversible inhibitor of PI-3 kinase with efficacy when delivered orally. It is an analog of the natural chemical compound wortmannin.

Sonolisib was put in a phase 1 clinical trial by Oncothyreon. The clinical development plan for sonolisib includes both standalone and combination therapy in major human cancers. In 2010, sonolisib was starting 4 phase II trials for solid tumors. The company gave an update on its phase 2 trials in Jun 2012. Phase 1 results (with docetaxel) published Aug 2013. In July 2014 published results of a phase 2 trial (for NSCLC) concluded : "The addition of PX-866 to docetaxel did not improve PFS, response rate, or OS in patients with advanced, refractory NSCLC without molecular preselection". In Sept 2015 as Phase 2 trial for recurrent glioblastoma reported not meeting its primary endpoint.
