= Wortmannin =

Names
- IUPAC name 1α-(Methoxymethyl)-3,7,17-trioxo-2-oxa-6,4-(epoxymetheno)androsta-5,8-dien-11α-yl acetate
- Systematic IUPAC name (1S,6bR,9aS,11R,11bR)-1-(Methoxymethyl)-9a,11b-dimethyl-3,6,9-trioxo-1,6,6b,7,8,9,9a,10,11,11b-decahydro-3H-furo[4,3,2-de]indeno[4,5-h][2]benzopyran-11-yl acetate

Identifiers
CAS Number	19545-26-7
3D model (JSmol)	Interactive image
ChEBI	CHEBI:52289
ChEMBL	ChEMBL428496
ChemSpider	276037
ECHA InfoCard	100.112.065
IUPHAR/BPS	6060
PubChem CID	312145
UNII	XVA4O219QW
CompTox Dashboard (EPA)	DTXSID8040642
- InChI: InChI=1S/C23H24O8/c1-10(24)30-13-7-22(2)12(5-6-14(22)25)16-18(13)23(3)15(9-28-4)31-21(27)11-8-29-20(17(11)23)19(16)26/h8,12-13,15H,5-7,9H2,1-4H3/t12-,13+,15+,22-,23-/m0/s1 Key: QDLHCMPXEPAAMD-QAIWCSMKSA-N
- SMILES: O=C\3c2occ1C(=O)O[C@@H]([C@@](c12)(/C5=C/3[C@H]4[C@](C(=O)CC4)(C)C[C@H]5OC(=O)C)C)COC

Properties
Chemical formula	C_{23}H_{24}O_{8}
Molar mass	428.437 g·mol^{−1}
Melting point	238 to 242 °C (460 to 468 °F; 511 to 515 K)
- Except where otherwise noted, data are given for materials in their standard state (at 25 °C [77 °F], 100 kPa). verify (what is ?) Infobox references

Wortmannin, a steroid metabolite of the fungi Penicillium funiculosum and Talaromyces wortmannii, is a non-specific, covalent inhibitor of phosphoinositide 3-kinases (PI3Ks). Chemically, it is a member of the furanosteroid class. Wortmannin has an in vitro inhibitory concentration (IC_{50}) of around 5 nM, making it a more potent inhibitor than LY294002, another commonly used PI3K inhibitor. It displays a similar potency in vitro for the class I, II, and III PI3K members although it can also inhibit other PI3K-related enzymes such as mTOR, DNA-PKcs, some phosphatidylinositol 4-kinases, myosin light chain kinase (MLCK) and mitogen-activated protein kinase (MAPK) at high concentrations Wortmannin has also been reported to inhibit members of the polo-like kinase family with IC_{50} in the same range as for PI3K. The half-life of wortmannin in tissue culture is about 10 minutes due to the presence of the highly reactive C20 carbon that is also responsible for its ability to covalently inactivate PI3K. Wortmannin is a commonly used cell biology reagent that has been used previously in research to inhibit DNA repair, receptor-mediated endocytosis and cell proliferation.

== Phosphoinositide-3-kinase ==
Phosphoinositide-3-kinase (PI3K) activates an important cell survival signaling pathway, and constitutive activation is seen in ovarian, head and neck, urinary tract, cervical and small cell lung cancer. PI3K signaling is attenuated by the phosphatase activity of the tumor suppressor PTEN that is absent in a number of human cancers. Inhibiting PI3K presents the opportunity to inhibit a major cancer cell survival signaling pathway and to overcome the action of an important deleted tumor suppressor, providing antitumor activity and increased tumor sensitivity to a wide variety of drugs.

Wortmannin is a PI3K inhibitor; as such, it has detrimental influence on memory and impairs spatial learning abilities.

== Derivatives ==
Medicinal chemistry research has been conducted to identify wortmannin derivatives that are more stable, while not losing its therapeutic effect.

Chemical structure of sonolisib

One of these, sonolisib, has been shown to be an irreversible inhibitor of PI-3 kinase with efficacy when delivered orally. Sonolisib is under development by Oncothyreon.
