= Jeremy Sanders =

British chemist

Jeremy Sanders CBE FRS
- Born: Jeremy Keith Morris Sanders; 3 May 1948 (age 78); London, England, UK
- Education: Imperial College London; University of Cambridge
- Known for: Dynamic combinatorial chemistry
- Awards: Davy Medal (2009)
- Scientific career
- Fields: Supramolecular chemistry
- Workplaces: University of Cambridge; Stanford University
- Thesis: Paramagnetic shift reagents in N.M.R. spectroscopy (1972)
- Doctoral advisor: Dudley Williams
- Doctoral students: Harry Anderson; Chris Hunter
- Website: www-sanders.ch.cam.ac.uk; www.ch.cam.ac.uk/person/jkms

Jeremy Keith Morris Sanders CBE FRS (born 3 May 1948) is a British chemist and Emeritus Professor in the Department of Chemistry at the University of Cambridge. He is also Editor-in-Chief of Royal Society Open Science. He is known for his contributions to many fields including NMR spectroscopy and supramolecular chemistry. He served as the Pro-Vice-Chancellor for Institutional Affairs at the University of Cambridge, 2011–2015.

== Education ==
Educated in London at Southmead Primary School and Wandsworth Comprehensive School, he then studied chemistry at Imperial College London where he graduated with a Bachelor of Science degree in 1969 and was awarded the Edmund White Prize. During 1969–72 he carried out his PhD research on lanthanide shift reagents, especially Eu(DPM), the original reagent developed before Eu(FOD) at Churchill College, Cambridge, supervised by Dudley Williams.

== Career and Research ==
Elected a fellow of Christ's College, Cambridge, in 1972, he spent a postdoctoral year in the Pharmacology Department, Stanford University before returning to Cambridge to become a Demonstrator in Chemistry. He was promoted to Lecturer (1978), Reader (1992) and then Professor (1996–2015). He was Head of the Chemistry Department 2000–2006, and Head of the School of Physical Sciences 2009–2011; he was also Deputy Vice-Chancellor 2006–2010 (responsible for overseeing the University's 800th Anniversary celebrations).

He was Chair from 2004 to 2008 of sub-panel 18 (Chemistry) for the UK 2008 Research Assessment Exercise.

NMR Spectroscopic achievements include the first complete analyses of the proton spectra of steroids through the pioneering use of NOEs and two-dimensional techniques, and new understanding of the biophysical chemistry in vivo of microbial storage polymers.

In supramolecular chemistry, his porphyrin systems have led to one of the first experimental verifications of the predicted Marcus 'inverted region', and the standard model (with Chris Hunter) of aromatic π-π interactions. He has used the coordination chemistry of Zn, Sn, Ru, Rh and Al oligoporphyrins

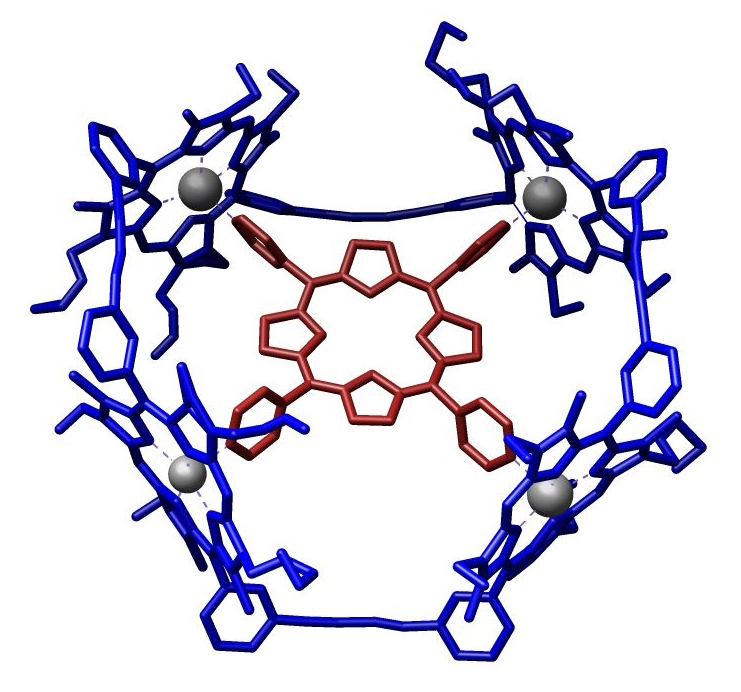
A cyclic metallo-porphyrin tetramer created by templated synthesis around a fifth porphyrin

to create new complex systems, to develop new templated approaches in synthesis, and to engineer the acceleration of intermolecular reactions within host cavities.

Since the mid-1990s he has been in the forefront (with Jean-Marie Lehn and several other research groups) of developing Dynamic covalent chemistry and the closely related dynamic combinatorial chemistry. In dynamic covalent chemistry, the most stable accessible product of a mixture is formed using thermodynamically controlled reversible reactions; in dynamic combinatorial chemistry a template is used to direct the synthesis of the molecule that best stabilises the template. In each case unpredictable molecules may be discovered that would not be designed or could not be prepared by conventional chemistry. These approaches have been particularly successful in preparing unpredictable Catenanes and other complex macrocycles including a molecular knot.

Sanders has also recently discovered helical supramolecular nanotubes capable of binding C_{60} Fullerene and other guests.

=== Awards and honours ===
- 1975 – Meldola Medal and Prize, Royal Institute of Chemistry
- 1981 – Hickinbottom Award, Royal Society of Chemistry, Royal Society of Chemistry
- 1984 – Pfizer Academic Award (for work on nuclear Overhauser effect), Royal Society of Chemistry
- 1988 – Pfizer Academic Award (for work on in vivo NMR), Royal Society of Chemistry
- 1994 – Josef Loschmidt Prize, Royal Society of Chemistry
- 1995 – Elected Fellow of the Royal Society (FRS)
- 1996 – Pedler Medal and Prize, Royal Society of Chemistry
- 2002 – Visiting Fellow, Japan Society for Promotion of Science, JSPS
- 2003 – Izatt-Christensen Award in Macrocyclic Chemistry (U.S.A.). A competitive award which recognizes excellence in macrocyclic chemistry, founded by Reed McNeil Izatt and James J. Christensen.
- 2009 – Davy Medal, The Royal Society "for his pioneering contributions to several fields, most recently to the field of dynamic combinatorial chemistry at the forefront of supramolecular chemistry"
- 2011 – President (Vice-President 2010), Bürgenstock Conference, Switzerland

He was appointed Commander of the Order of the British Empire (CBE) in the 2014 Birthday Honours for services to scientific research. Sanders' nomination for the Royal Society reads:

Distinguished for his innovative applications of NMR spectroscopy in organic and biological chemistry, for his biomimetic porphyrin systems, and his theory of pi-pi interactions. His early explorations of lanthanide shift reagents greatly enhanced the power of NMR to solve questions of structure and conformation for the organic chemist. He then pioneered the use of NOE difference spectroscopy in organic chemistry, his achievements including the first complete analyses of the proton spectra of steroids. Sanders' techniques for acquiring, manipulating and interpreting NOE difference spectra have become world-wide standard laboratory practice. His notable contributions to biological chemistry through NMR include the first measurement of an enzymic kinetic isotope effect in live cells, and the use of deuterium NMR to elucidate the substrate specificity and absolute stereochemistry of intracellular bacterial formaldehyde dismutases. Most importantly, he has resolved many of the long-standing paradoxes between the known in situ enzymology and the apparently contradictory physical chemistry of isolated granules. Sanders is responsible for the creation and study of numerous model photosynthetic and enzymic systems based on porphyrins. These studies gave one of the first experimental verifications of the long-sought Marcus 'inverted region' in photoinduced electron transfer, and led to the development of a general model explaining pi-pi interactions. The model for pi-pi interactions, and its derived geometrical rules, is relevant to the structure of DNA duplexes and proteins; it promises to make a major impact in many areas. Like much of Sanders' work, it demolishes well-entrenched preconceptions through the clear use of simple insights and the deliberate crossing of disciplinary boundaries.
