= Harry Anderson (chemist) =

British chemist

Harry Anderson FRS
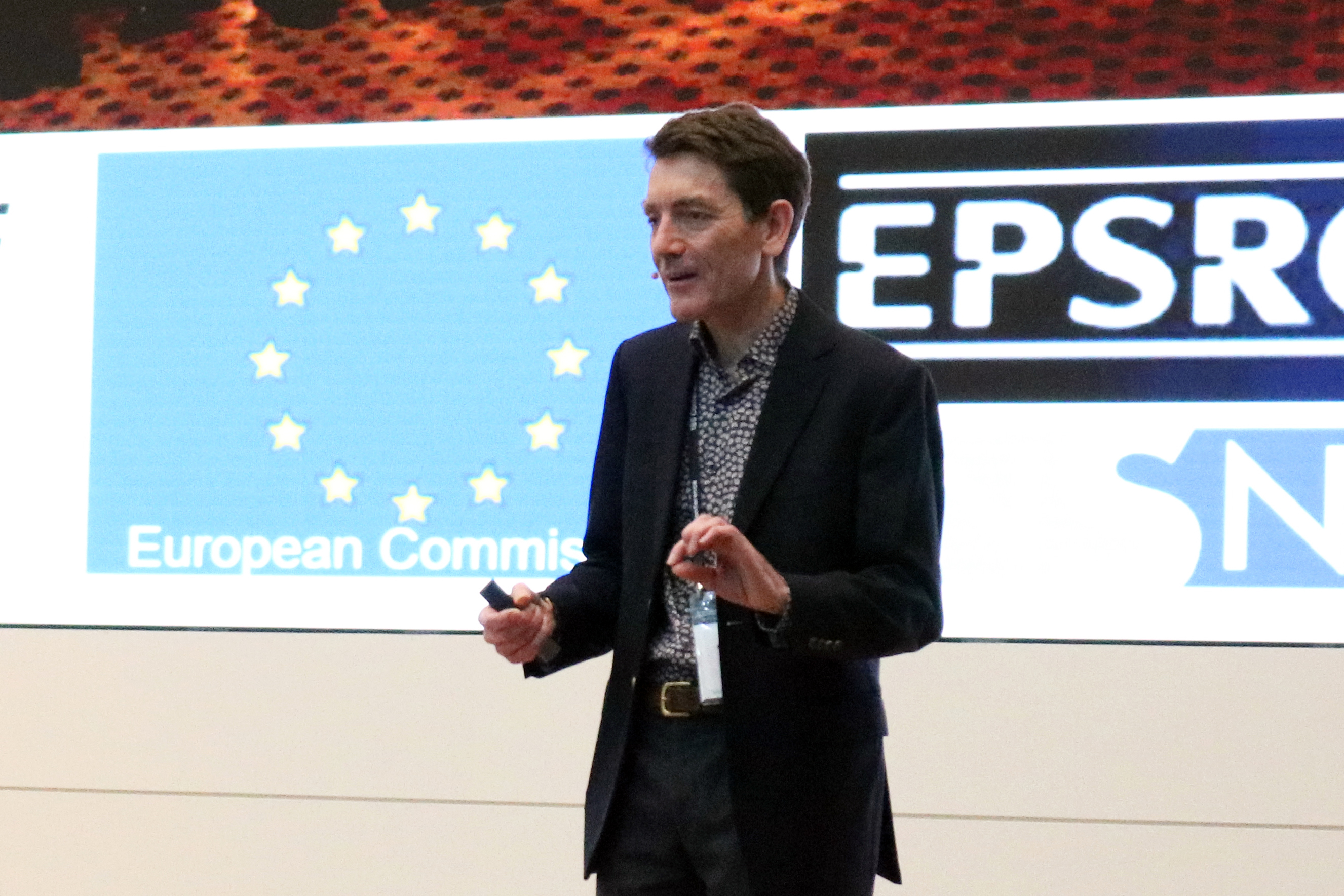
- Born: Harry Laurence Anderson; 12 January 1964 (age 62)
- Education: University of Oxford; University of Cambridge
- Known for: Porphyrin Nanorings
- Scientific career
- Fields: Organic chemistry
- Workplaces: University of Oxford; ETH-Zürich
- Thesis: Model Enzymes Based on Porphyrins (1991)
- Doctoral advisor: Jeremy Sanders
- Notable students: Ed Anderson
- Website: hla.chem.ox.ac.uk

Harry Laurence Anderson FRS is a British chemist in the Department of Chemistry, University of Oxford. He is well known for his contributions in the syntheses of supramolecular systems (porphyrin nanorings and nanowires), exploration of the extraordinary physical properties of large pi-conjugated systems, and synthesis of cyclo[18]carbon. He is a Professor of Chemistry at Keble College, Oxford.

== Education ==
Harry Anderson studied chemistry at Christ Church, University of Oxford, where he received his Bachelor of Arts degree in 1987. This was followed by graduate studies under Jeremy Sanders at the University of Cambridge, where he received his doctoral degree in 1990.

== Career and Research ==
Anderson started his independent research as a research fellow at Magdalene College, Cambridge in 1990–1993, and conducted his research in 1993–1994 as SERC postdoctoral research fellow at ETH-Zürich, Switzerland. He returned to University of Oxford in 1994 as university lecturer in organic chemistry and tutor in Keble College. In 2004, he became professor of chemistry at the University of Oxford.

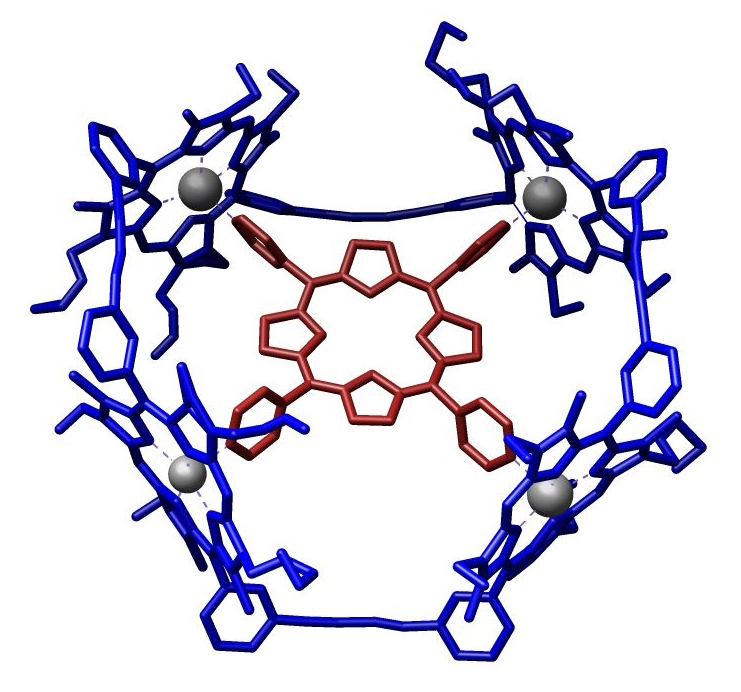
An example of a porphyrin nanoring system.

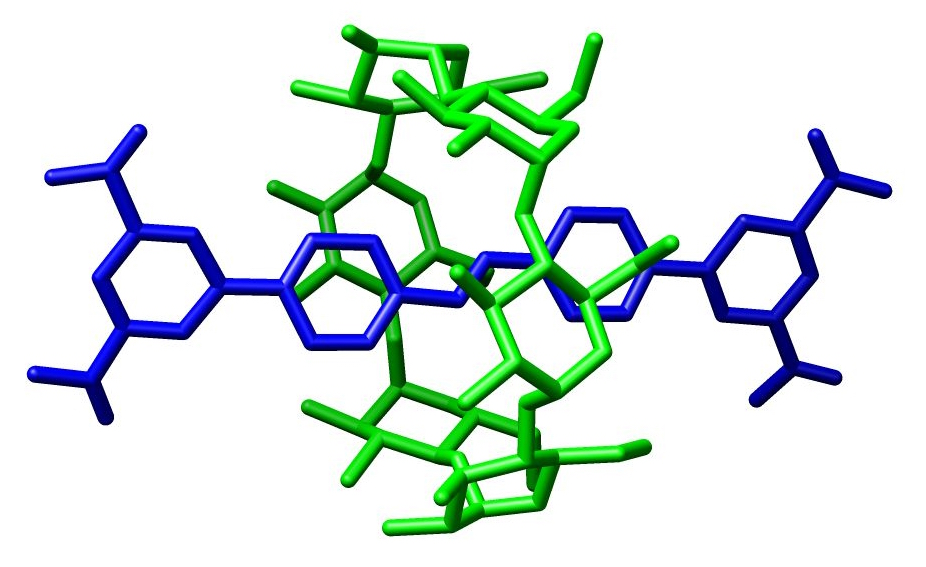
Crystal structure of a rotaxane with an α-cyclodextrin macrocycle.

Template directed syntheses ubiquitously exist in nature (protein biosynthesis, etc.), which provides inspiration for synthesising artificial supramolecular systems. Using porphyrin monomers/oligomers and molecular templates of various sizes, porphyrin nanoring systems can be constructed with high versatility. These supramolecular systems also bear appealing co-ordination properties, providing inspirations for the co-ordination phenomena existing in nature.

Vernier templating refers to the syntheses of complexes using templates and molecular building blocks with mismatching co-ordination numbers to construct larger molecular systems by incorporating more than one template molecule and more molecular building blocks than usual. Porphyrin nanoring systems are excellent examples in realising this methodology and giant artificial molecular systems with their molecular weights of small proteins can be constructed.

Based on the work of organic synthesis, his research interests have found wide range of collaborators from versatile academic backgrounds all over the world. It was found that elongated/encapsulated pi-conjugate systems constructed by porphyrins showed unprecedented physical properties in charge transfer, two-photon absorption, etc., thereby providing physicists and photobiologists new candidates and inspirations in their research.

=== Honours and awards ===
- 2017 Izatt-Christensen Award (in Macrocyclic and Supramolecular Chemistry)
- 2013 Elected a Fellow of the Royal Society.
- 2008 Merck-Karl Pfister Visiting Professor in Organic Chemistry, MIT, USA
- 2006 RSC Industrially-Sponsored Award for Supramolecular Chemistry
- 2003 Royal Society of Chemistry Award for Materials Chemistry
- 2003 Bob Hay Lecturer (Royal Society of Chemistry, Macrocyclic Chemistry)
- 2001 Corday Morgan Medal and Prize from the Royal Society of Chemistry
- 1995 Nuffield Foundation Award to Newly Appointed Science Lecturers
- 1993 NATO/SERC Research Fellowship

Anderson's nomination for the Royal Society in 2013 reads:

Harry Anderson is known internationally for his insightful contributions to the design and synthesis of supramolecular materials and molecular wires. He has introduced new concepts for molecular design, and ground-breaking approaches to template-directed synthesis, leading to materials with unprecedented electronic and nonlinear optical characteristics. He has pioneered the investigation of conjugated porphyrin oligomers, encapsulated pi-systems, nanorings and two-photon absorbing dyes, and he has worked closely with physicists and photobiologists to understand the relationship between molecular structure and function. His work has resulted in profound insights into the factors controlling long-range electronic coupling and charge-transport in supramolecular systems.
