= Class II PI 3-kinases =

Class of enzymes

Class II PI 3-kinases are a subgroup of the enzyme family, phosphoinositide 3-kinase that share a common protein domain structure, substrate specificity and method of activation.

Class II PI 3-kinases were the most recently identified class of PI 3-kinases.

There are three class II PI 3-kinase isoforms expressed in mammalian cells;

- PI3K-C2α encoded by the PIK3C2A gene
- PI3K-C2β encoded by the PIK3C2B gene
- PI3K-C2γ encoded by the PIK3C2G gene

== See also ==
- Phosphoinositide 3-kinase
