= Class III PI 3-kinase =

Enzyme family

Class III PI 3-kinase is a subgroup of the enzyme family, phosphoinositide 3-kinase that share a common protein domain structure, substrate specificity and method of activation.

There is only one known class III PI 3-kinase, Vps34, which is also the only PI 3-kinase expressed in all eukaryotic cells. In humans it is encoded by the PIK3C3 gene. In human cells Vps34 associates with a regulatory subunit, PIK3R4(p150, Vps15).

== Substrate specificity ==
Vps34 is more accurately described as a phosphatidylinositol 3-kinase. In vivo Vps34 can phosphorylate only phosphatidylinositol to form phosphatidylinositol (3)-phosphate (PtdIns(3)P).

== Functions ==
Vps34 was first identified in a Saccharomyces cerevisiae (budding yeast) screen for proteins involved vesicle-mediated vacuolar protein sorting (hence Vps). A number of proteins containing a phosphoinositide binding domain specific for PtdIns(3)P that function in cellular protein trafficking have been identified.

Vps34 has been shown to interact with Vps15 (PIK3R4, p150), a protein kinase. Vps15 can activate the lipid kinase activity of Vps34 and interact with Rab5, which has been hypothesized to recruit the Vps34/15 complex to early endosomes. Vps15 has a myristoylation tag that associates the complex with the membrane. The Vps34/15 complex also can interact with Rab7. Together, the complex can function at early to late endosomes.

Vps34 has a calmodulin binding domain, but its activity has been clearly shown to be calcium-independent in vitro and in vivo. The functional role of its interactions with calmodulin in vivo are not understood.

Vps34 activity is required for autophagy in yeast, and has been strongly implicated in this process in mammals. Vps34 has also been implicated in amino acid sensing. Vps34 is necessary for mTORC1 activity in response to amino acids in cultured cells, as siRNA knockdown completely inhibits mTORC1 signaling as determined by S6K phosphorylation. Sequestration of the Vps34 product by FYVE domain overexpression also disrupts mTOR signaling. However, genetic ablation of Vps34 in Drosophila does not affect dTORC1 signaling. Thus, the role of Vps34 in amino acid signaling to mTORC1 remains controversial.

One recent paper suggested that the human ortholog is regulated by intracellular calcium, but this was later shown to be due to a calcium-independent inhibition of Vps34 by EGTA, an effect not seen with other calcium chelators.

The mechanisms that regulate Vps34 activity in mammalian cells are not yet understood.

== See also ==
- PX domain

== Literature ==
- Stein RC (September 2001). "Prospects for phosphoinositide 3-kinase inhibition as a cancer treatment". Endocrine-Related Cancer. 8 (3): 237–248. doi:10.1677/erc.0.0080237. PMID 11566615.
- Foster FM, Traer CJ, Abraham SM, Fry MJ (August 2003). "The phosphoinositide (PI) 3-kinase family". Journal of Cell Science. 116 (Pt 15): 3037–3040. doi:10.1242/jcs.00609. PMID 12829733.
- Vanhaesebroeck B, Waterfield MD (November 1999). "Signaling by distinct classes of phosphoinositide 3-kinases". Experimental Cell Research. 253 (1): 239–254. doi:10.1006/excr.1999.4701. PMID 10579926.
