= Papyrus 84 =

Papyrus 𝔓^{84}
- New Testament manuscript
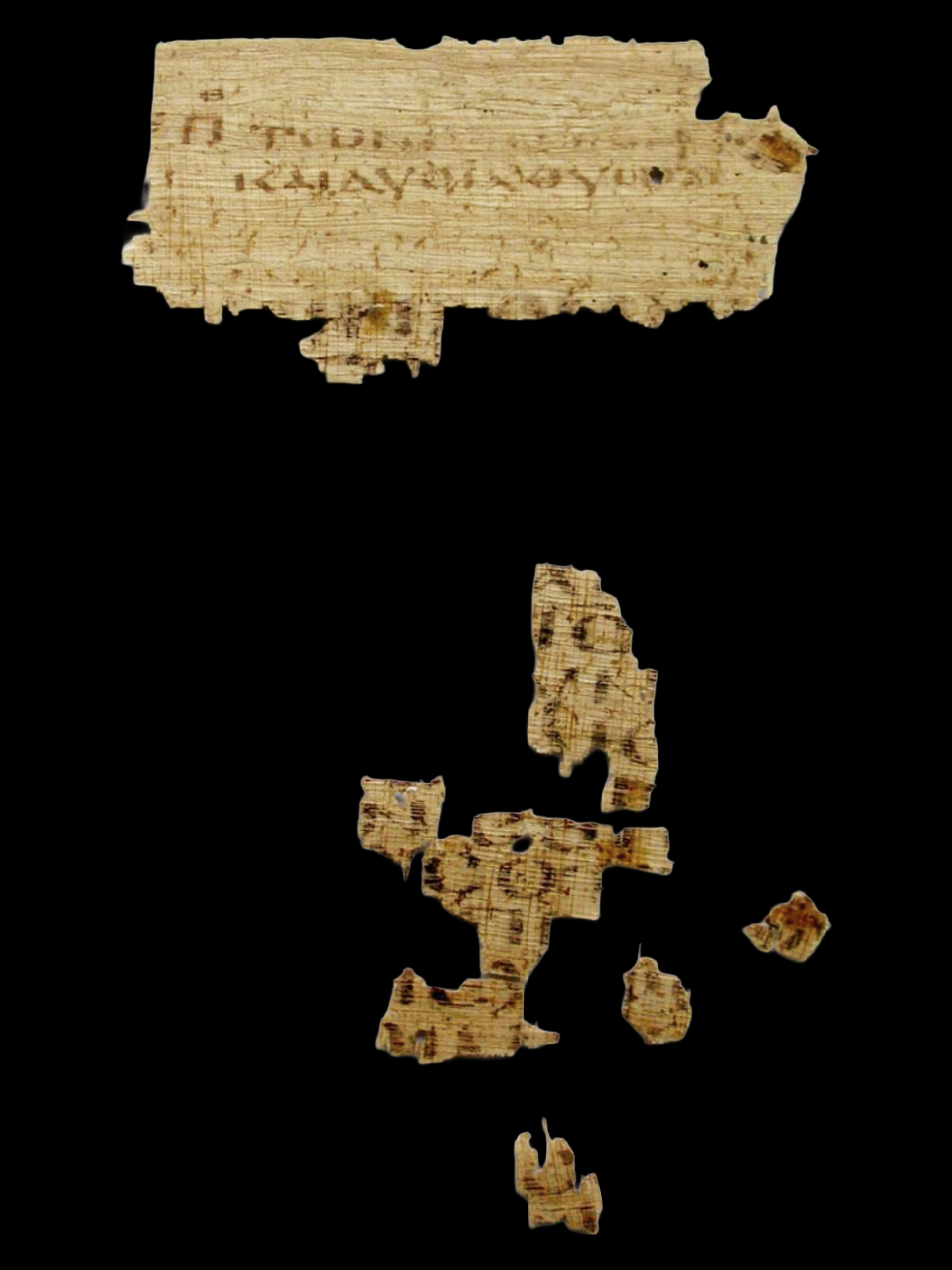
- Fragments 1 recto, Mark 6:36-37
- Text: Mark 2; 5 †; John 5; 17 †
- Date: c. 500-600
- Script: Greek
- Found: Egypt
- Now at: Katholieke Universiteit Leuven
- Cite: unpublished
- Type: Mixed or Byzantine Text-Type
- Category: III

Papyrus 84 (in the Gregory-Aland numbering), designated by 𝔓^{84}, is a copy of the New Testament in Greek. It is a papyrus manuscript of the four Gospels. The surviving texts of Gospels are verses Mark 2:2-5,8-9; 6:30-31,33-34,36-37,39-41; John 5:5; 17:3,7-8. The manuscript paleographically has been assigned to the 6th century.

Text

The Greek text of this codex probably is mixed with strong element of the Byzantine text-type. Aland placed it in Category III. Divisive clustering analysis of INTF data for Mark places P84's text in the same branch as lectionaries L770, L773, L211, L387, L950, and L60.

Location

It is currently housed at the Katholieke Universiteit Leuven Library (P. A. M. Khirbet Mird, Greek 1–3; formerly P. A. M. Khirbet Mird 4, 11, 26, 27).

== See also ==
- List of New Testament papyri
- Papyrus 83
