= PIK3R3 =

Protein-coding gene in humans

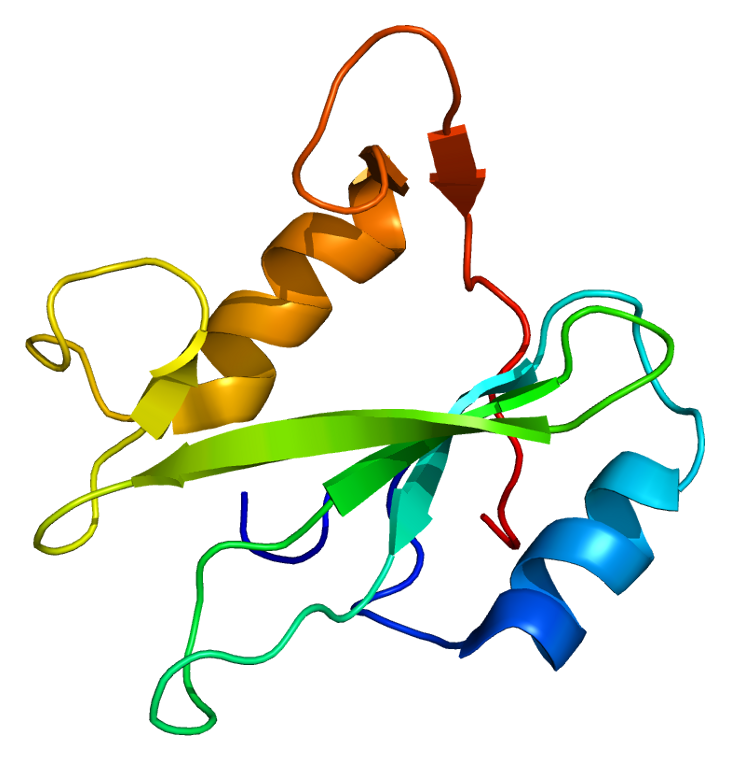

Identifiers
- Aliases: PIK3R3, p55, p55-GAMMA, p55PIK, phosphoinositide-3-kinase regulatory subunit 3, PI3KR3
- External IDs: OMIM: 606076; MGI: 109277; GeneCards: PIK3R3

Gene location (Human)
Chr.	Chromosome 1 (human)
Band	1p34.1	Start	46,040,140 bp
Band	1p34.1	End	46,133,036 bp

Gene location (Mouse)
Chr.	Chromosome 4 (mouse)
Band	4|4 D1	Start	116,078,815 bp
Band	4|4 D1	End	116,160,253 bp
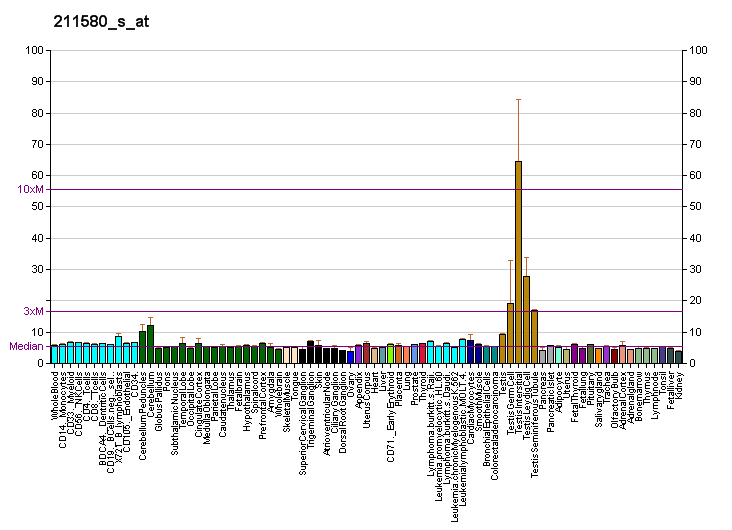

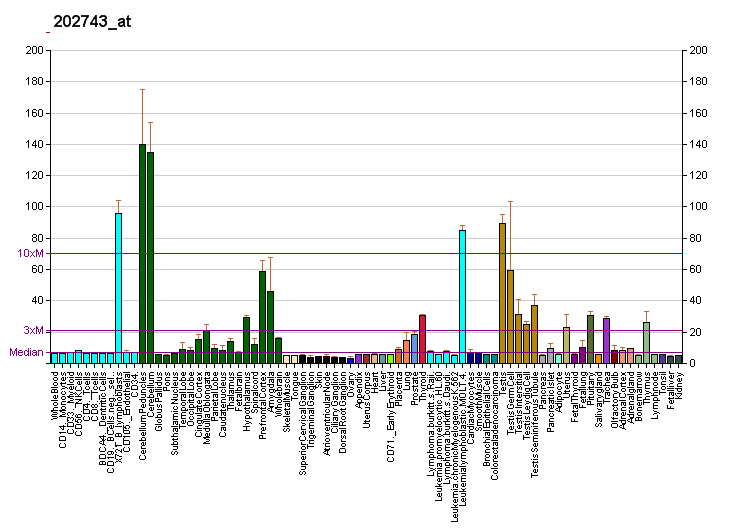
RNA expression pattern
Bgee	Human / Mouse (ortholog); Top expressed in: cerebellar vermis; paraflocculus of cerebellum; nasal epithelium; lower lobe of lung; right hemisphere of cerebellum; mucosa of paranasal sinus; right ventricle; right lung; testicle; ganglionic eminence / Top expressed in: cerebellar vermis; lobe of cerebellum; zygote; hand; ganglionic eminence; otic vesicle; inferior colliculi; suprachiasmatic nucleus; pontine nuclei; secondary oocyte; More reference expression data
BioGPS	More reference expression data
Gene ontology
Molecular function	phosphatidylinositol 3-kinase regulator activity; protein binding; 1-phosphatidylinositol-3-kinase activity; phosphotyrosine residue binding; 1-phosphatidylinositol-3-kinase regulator activity
Cellular component	cytosol; phosphatidylinositol 3-kinase complex
Biological process	regulation of phosphatidylinositol 3-kinase activity; phosphatidylinositol-3-phosphate biosynthetic process; insulin receptor signaling pathway; positive regulation of protein phosphorylation; cell migration involved in sprouting angiogenesis; positive regulation of gene expression; protein kinase B signaling; positive regulation of cell migration; phosphatidylinositol phosphate biosynthetic process; phosphatidylinositol biosynthetic process
Sources:Amigo / QuickGO
Orthologs
Databases	NCBI: entry; OMA: entry
Species	Human	Mouse
Entrez	8503	18710
Ensembl	ENSG00000117461	ENSMUSG00000028698
UniProt	Q92569	Q64143
RefSeq (mRNA)	NM_001114172; NM_001303428; NM_001303429; NM_001328648; NM_001328649 NM_001328650; NM_001328651; NM_001328652; NM_001328653; NM_001328654; NM_003629	NM_181585; NM_001355584; NM_001355585; NM_001355586
RefSeq (protein)	NP_001107644; NP_001290357; NP_001290358; NP_001315577; NP_001315578 NP_001315579; NP_001315580; NP_001315581; NP_001315582; NP_001315583; NP_003620	NP_853616; NP_001342513; NP_001342514; NP_001342515
Location (UCSC)	Chr 1: 46.04 – 46.13 Mb	Chr 4: 116.08 – 116.16 Mb
PubMed search
- Wikidata
View/Edit Human	View/Edit Mouse

Phosphatidylinositol 3-kinase regulatory subunit gamma is an enzyme, which in humans is encoded by the PIK3R3 gene.

== Interactions ==
PIK3R3 has been shown to interact with Insulin-like growth factor 1 receptor, IRS1 and Retinoblastoma protein.
