= Phosphatidylinositol-4,5-bisphosphate 3-kinase =

phosphatidylinositol-4,5-bisphosphate 3-kinase

Identifiers
- EC no.: 2.7.1.153

Databases
- IntEnz: IntEnz view
- BRENDA: BRENDA entry
- ExPASy: NiceZyme view
- KEGG: KEGG entry
- MetaCyc: metabolic pathway
- PRIAM: profile
- PDB structures: RCSB PDB PDBe PDBsum
- Gene Ontology: AmiGO / QuickGO
Search
- PMC: articles
- PubMed: articles
- NCBI: proteins

In enzymology, a phosphatidylinositol-4,5-bisphosphate 3-kinase (EC 2.7.1.153) is an enzyme that catalyzes the chemical reaction:

ATP + 1-phosphatidyl-1D-myo-inositol 4,5-bisphosphate $\rightleftharpoons$ ADP + 1-phosphatidyl-1D-myo-inositol 3,4,5-trisphosphate

Thus, the two substrates of this enzyme are ATP and 1-phosphatidyl-1D-myo-inositol 4,5-bisphosphate, whereas its two products are ADP and 1-phosphatidyl-1D-myo-inositol 3,4,5-trisphosphate.

This enzyme belongs to the family of transferases, specifically those transferring phosphorus-containing groups (phosphotransferases) with an alcohol group as acceptor. The systematic name of this enzyme class is ATP:1-phosphatidyl-1D-myo-inositol-4,5-bisphosphate 3-phosphotransferase. This enzyme is also called type I phosphoinositide 3-kinase. This enzyme participates in 29 metabolic pathways: inositol phosphate metabolism, erbb signaling pathway, phosphatidylinositol signaling system, mtor signaling pathway, apoptosis, VEGF signaling pathway, focal adhesion, toll-like receptor signaling pathway, jak-stat signaling pathway, natural killer cell mediated cytotoxicity, t cell receptor signaling pathway, b cell receptor signaling pathway, fc epsilon ri signaling pathway, leukocyte transendothelial migration, regulation of actin cytoskeleton, insulin signaling pathway, progesterone-mediated oocyte maturation, Type II diabetes mellitus, colorectal cancer, renal cell carcinoma, pancreatic cancer, endometrial cancer, glioma, prostate cancer, melanoma, chronic myeloid leukemia, acute myeloid leukemia, small cell lung cancer, and non-small cell lung cancer.

== Structural studies ==
As of late 2007, 6 structures have been solved for this class of enzymes, with PDB accession codes 2A4Z, 2A5U, 2CHW, 2CHX, 2CHZ, and 2V1Y.

== Examples ==
Human genes encoding proteins with phosphatidylinositol-4,5-bisphosphate 3-kinase activity include:

- PIK3CA
- PIK3CB
- PIK3CD
- PIK3CG
