= Furanosteroid =

A steroid containing a fused furan ring

Chemical structure of viridin, a prototypical furanosteroid

Furanosteroids are a class of natural chemical compounds that are characterized by a furan ring fused to a typical steroid structure.

Examples of furanosteroids include:

- Wortmannin: a fungal metabolite isolated from Penicillium funiculosum and Talaromyces wortmannii. It is an irreversible PI3K inhibitor widely used as a research tool.
- Viridin: the prototypical example of the class, isolated from Trichoderma species. It has strong antifungal activity.
- Demethoxyviridin: a close viridin analog lacking the methoxy group.
- Viridiol: a reduced form of viridin, produced by Trichoderma virens with herbicidal activity.
- Demethoxyviridiol: a reduced analog of demethoxyviridin.
- Wortmannolone: a wortmannin-related metabolite with a modified ring system.
- 11-Desacetylwortmannin (and related hydroxywortmannins): deacetylated or hydroxylated wortmannin variants.
- Nodulisporiviridins (A–H): a group of viridin-type compounds from Nodulisporium fungi.
- Cyclocalopins: a group of compounds from the bolete mushroom Caloboletus calopus.
