= Papyrus 83 =

Papyrus 𝔓^{83}
- New Testament manuscript
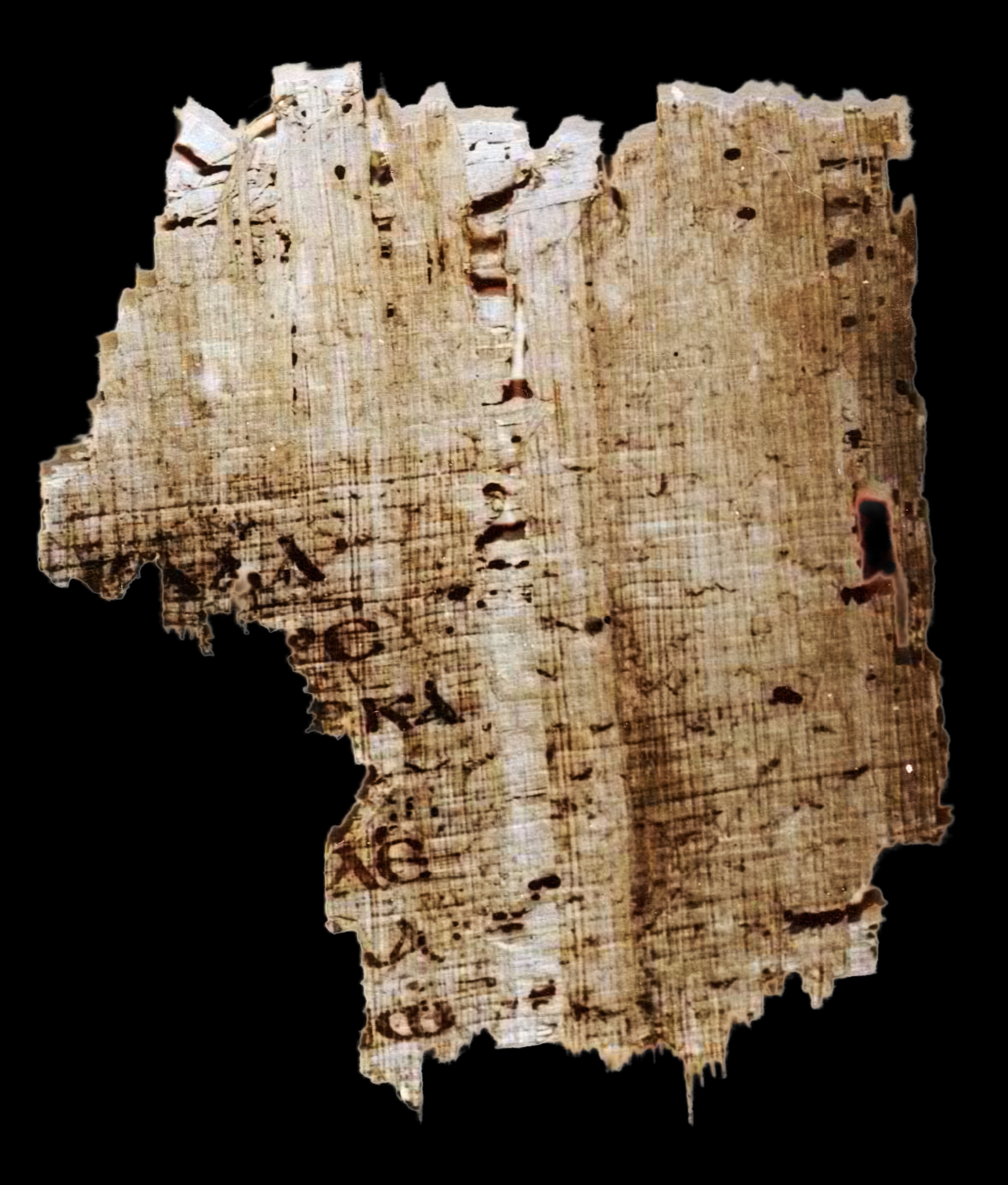
- Fragment 1 recto, Matt 20:23-25
- Text: Gospel of Matthew 20; 23-24 †
- Date: 6th century
- Script: Greek
- Found: Egypt
- Now at: Katholieke Universiteit Leuven
- Cite: M.-L. Lakmann, ‘Neutestamentliche Texte aus Khirbet Mird. P83 und 0244’, ETL 85/4 (2009), 467–478.
- Size: 28 cm x 21.5 cm
- Type: mixed
- Category: III

Papyrus 83 (in the Gregory-Aland numbering), designated by 𝔓^{83}, is a copy of the New Testament in Greek. It is a papyrus manuscript of the Gospel of Matthew. The surviving texts of Matthew are verses 20:23-25,30-31; 23:39-24:1,6. The manuscript paleographically has been assigned to the 6th century. It is among only very few New Testament texts on papyrus recovered outside Egypt (in this case from Khirbet Mird in the Judean desert).

Text

The Greek text of this codex probably is mixed. Aland placed it in Category III.

Location

It is currently housed at the Katholieke Universiteit Leuven Library (P. A. M. Khirbet Mird 16, 29). Transcriptions and photographs have been published by Lakmann.

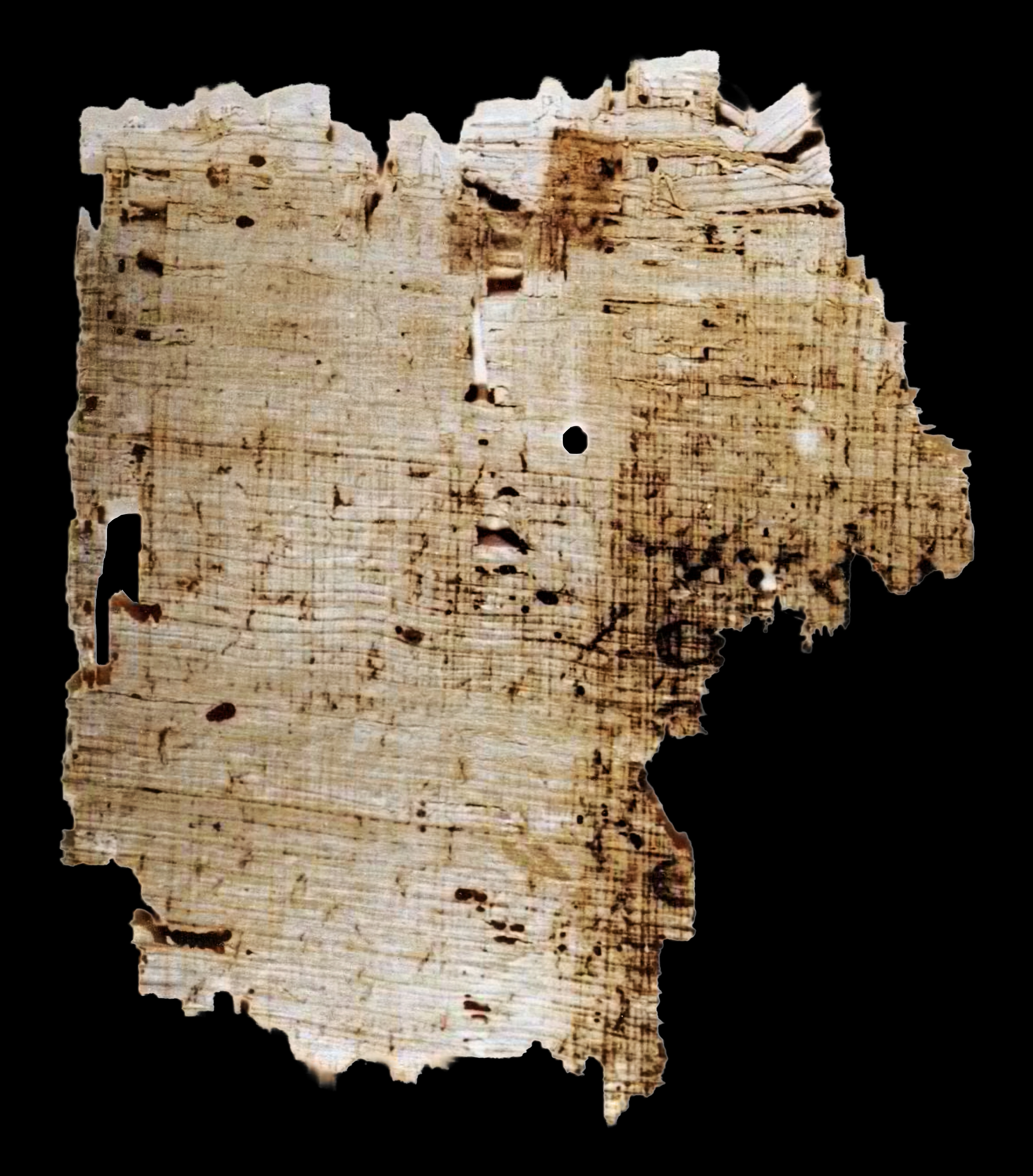
Fragment 1 verso, Matt 20:30-31

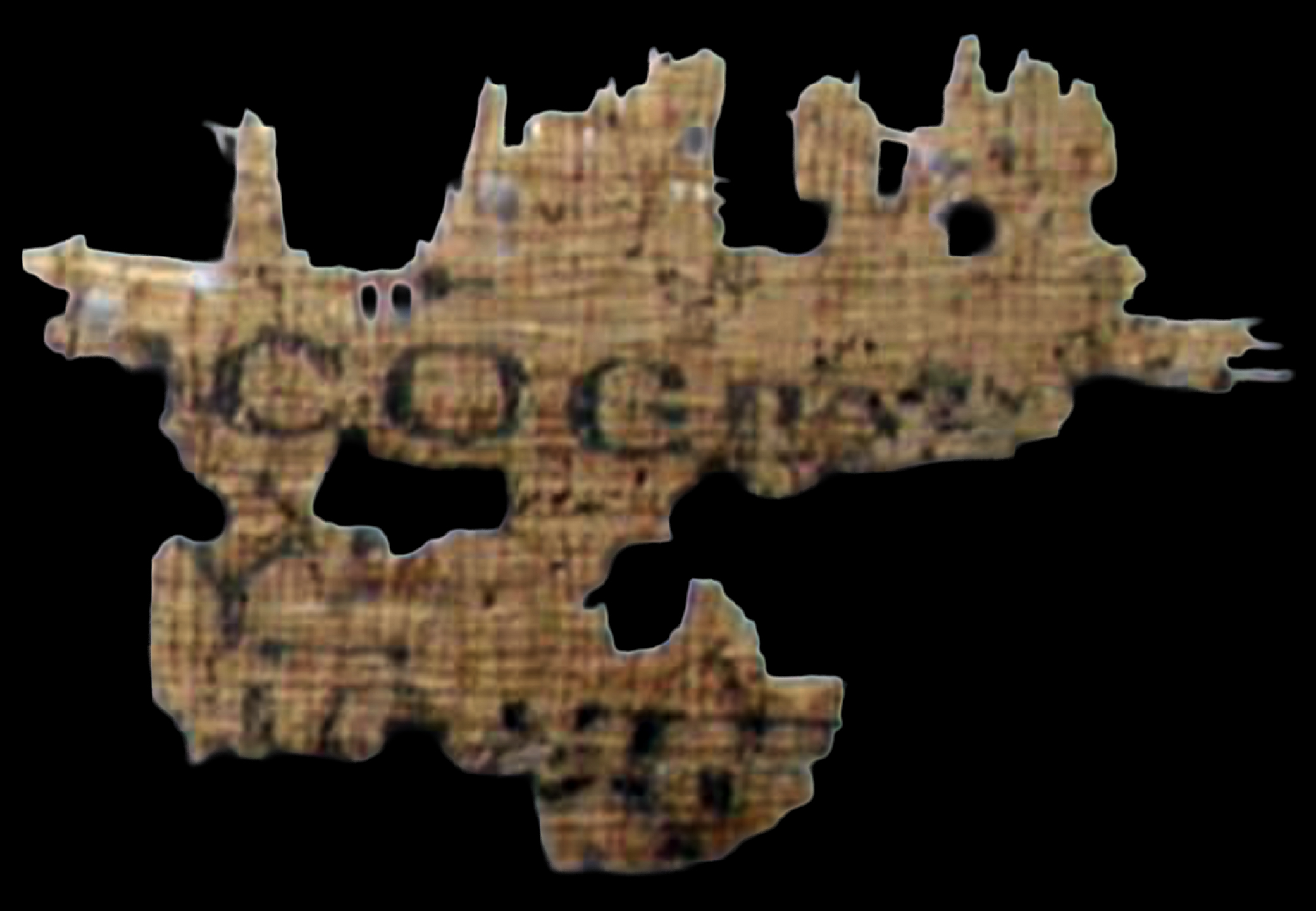
Fragment 2 recto, Matt 23:39-24:1

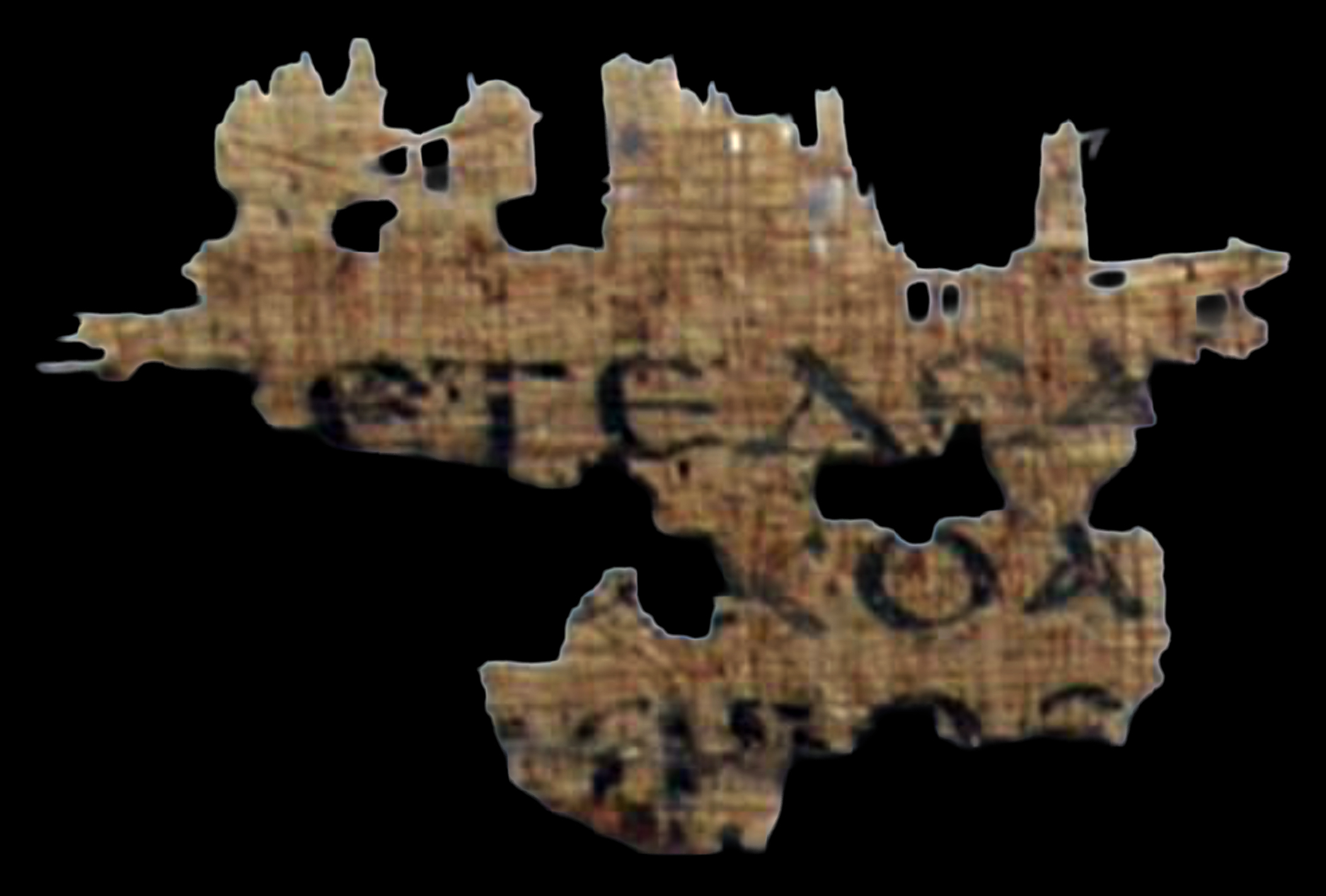
Fragment 2 verso, Matt 24:6

== See also ==
- List of New Testament papyri
- Papyrus 84
