= PIK3C2G =

Protein-coding gene in the species Homo sapiens

Identifiers
- Aliases: PIK3C2G, PI3K-C2-gamma, PI3K-C2GAMMA, phosphatidylinositol-4-phosphate 3-kinase catalytic subunit type 2 gamma
- External IDs: OMIM: 609001; MGI: 1203730; GeneCards: PIK3C2G
Available structures
PDB	Ortholog search: PDBe RCSB
PDB	List of PDB id codes 2WWE
Enzyme activity
EC #	BRENDA	ExPASy	KEGG	MetaCyc
2.7.1.137	↗	↗	↗	↗
2.7.1.154	↗	↗	↗	↗

Gene location (Human)
Chr.	Chromosome 12 (human)
Band	12p12.3	Start	18,242,961 bp
Band	12p12.3	End	18,648,416 bp

Gene location (Mouse)
Chr.	Chromosome 6 (mouse)
Band	6 G2|6 69.7 cM	Start	139,564,219 bp
Band	6 G2|6 69.7 cM	End	139,915,010 bp
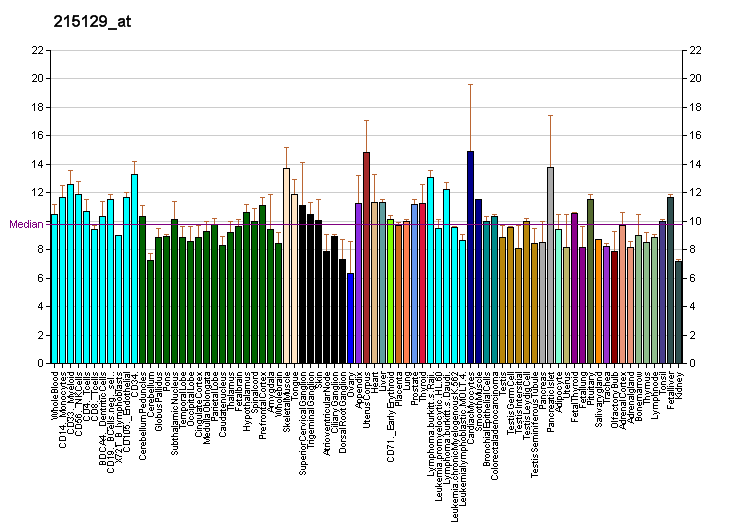
RNA expression pattern
Bgee	Human / Mouse (ortholog); Top expressed in: corpus epididymis; hair follicle; skin of thigh; testicle; skin of abdomen; right lobe of liver; gallbladder; stomach; body of stomach; seminal vesicula / Top expressed in: morula; right kidney; stomach; epithelium of stomach; outer nuclear layer; proximal tubule; genital tubercle; spermatid; liver; skin of external ear; More reference expression data
BioGPS	More reference expression data
Gene ontology
Molecular function	nucleotide binding; transferase activity; kinase activity; phosphatidylinositol phosphate kinase activity; phosphatidylinositol binding; 1-phosphatidylinositol-3-kinase activity; ATP binding; 1-phosphatidylinositol-4-phosphate 3-kinase activity; phosphatidylinositol 3-kinase activity
Cellular component	cytosol; membrane; plasma membrane; phosphatidylinositol 3-kinase complex; cytoplasm
Biological process	phosphatidylinositol-mediated signaling; phosphatidylinositol phosphate biosynthetic process; chemotaxis; phosphorylation; phosphatidylinositol-3-phosphate biosynthetic process; phosphatidylinositol 3-kinase signaling; cell migration; phosphatidylinositol biosynthetic process
Sources:Amigo / QuickGO
Orthologs
Databases	NCBI: entry; OMA: entry
Species	Human	Mouse
Entrez	5288	18705
Ensembl	ENSG00000139144	ENSMUSG00000030228
UniProt	O75747	O70167
RefSeq (mRNA)	NM_001288772; NM_001288774; NM_004570	NM_011084; NM_207683
RefSeq (protein)	NP_001275701; NP_001275703; NP_004561	NP_035214; NP_997566
Location (UCSC)	Chr 12: 18.24 – 18.65 Mb	Chr 6: 139.56 – 139.92 Mb
PubMed search
- Wikidata
View/Edit Human	View/Edit Mouse

Phosphatidylinositol-4-phosphate 3-kinase C2 domain-containing gamma polypeptide is an enzyme that in humans is encoded by the PIK3C2G gene.

The protein encoded by this gene belongs to the phosphoinositide 3-kinase (PI3K) family. PI3-kinases play roles in signaling pathways involved in cell proliferation, oncogenic transformation, cell survival, cell migration, and intracellular protein trafficking. This protein contains a lipid kinase catalytic domain as well as a C-terminal C2 domain, a characteristic of class II PI3-kinases. C2 domains act as calcium-dependent phospholipid binding motifs that mediate translocation of proteins to membranes, and may also mediate protein-protein interactions. The biological function of this gene has not yet been determined.
