= PIK3R2 =

Protein-coding gene in the species Homo sapiens

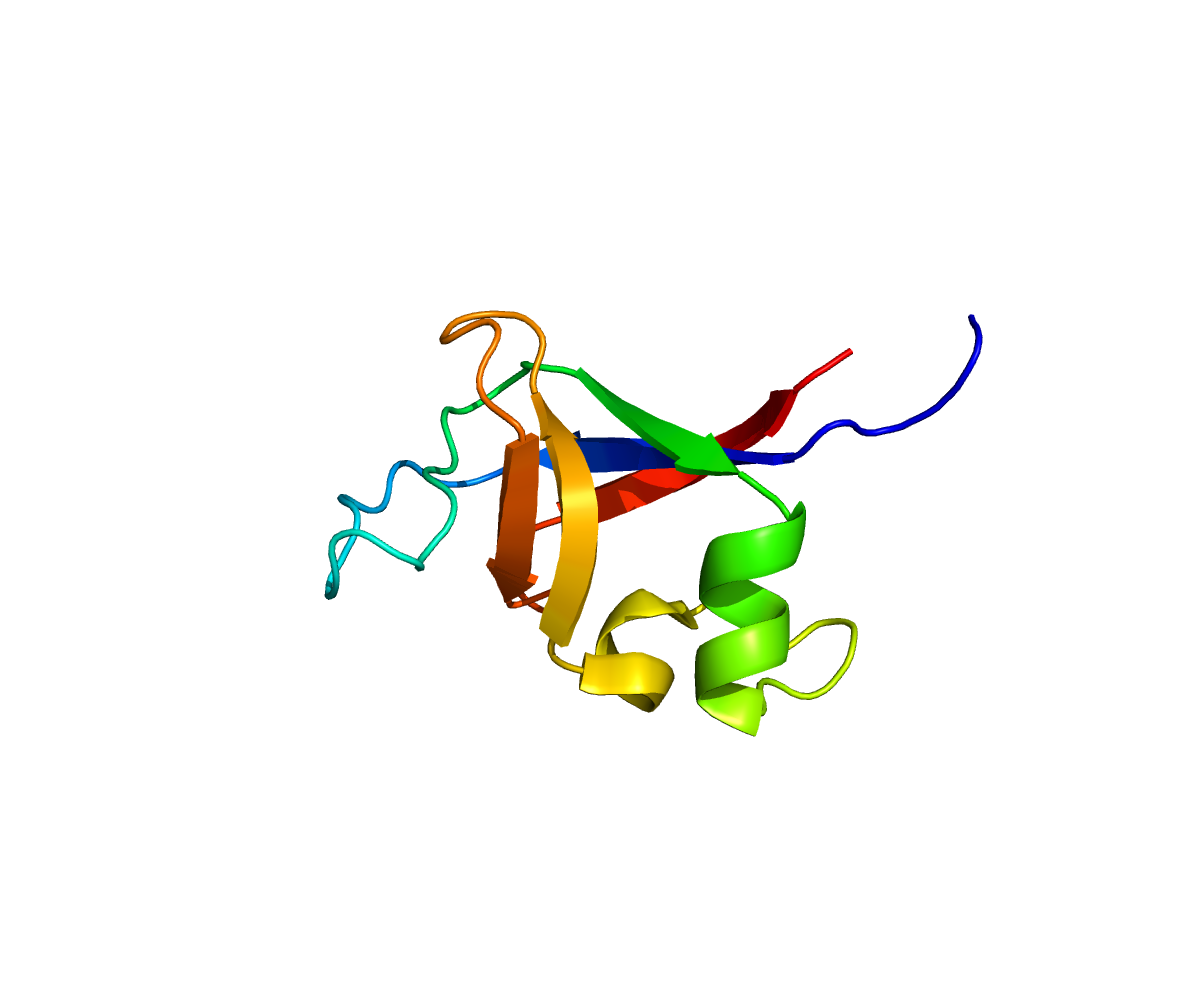

Identifiers
- Aliases: PIK3R2, MPPH, MPPH1, P85B, p85, p85-BETA, phosphoinositide-3-kinase regulatory subunit 2
- External IDs: OMIM: 603157; MGI: 1098772; GeneCards: PIK3R2
Available structures
PDB	Ortholog search: PDBe RCSB
PDB	List of PDB id codes 2KT1, 2XS6, 3MTT, 3O5Z

Gene location (Mouse)
Chr.	Chromosome 8 (mouse)
Band	8 B3.3|8 34.15 cM	Start	71,220,820 bp
Band	8 B3.3|8 34.15 cM	End	71,229,357 bp
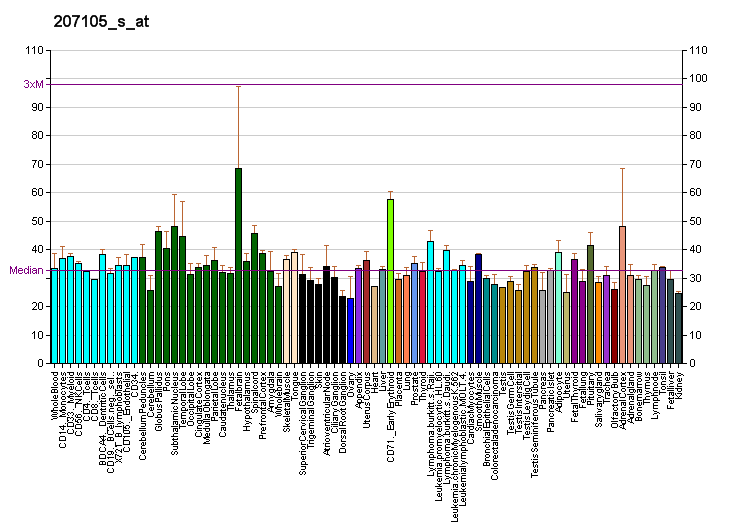
RNA expression pattern
Bgee	Human / Mouse (ortholog); Top expressed in: ganglionic eminence; stromal cell of endometrium; prefrontal cortex; hippocampus proper; superior frontal gyrus; left adrenal gland; nucleus accumbens; temporal lobe; amygdala; caudate nucleus / Top expressed in: primary visual cortex; striatum of neuraxis; superior frontal gyrus; hippocampus proper; olfactory bulb; cerebellum; ganglionic eminence; lip; dentate gyrus of hippocampal formation granule cell; cerebellar cortex; More reference expression data
BioGPS	More reference expression data
Gene ontology
Molecular function	phosphatidylinositol 3-kinase regulator activity; receptor tyrosine kinase binding; 1-phosphatidylinositol-3-kinase regulator activity; protein binding; protein heterodimerization activity; protein phosphatase binding; GTPase activator activity; phosphatidylinositol-4,5-bisphosphate 3-kinase activity; phosphotyrosine residue binding; 1-phosphatidylinositol-3-kinase activity
Cellular component	cytosol; phosphatidylinositol 3-kinase complex; nucleus
Biological process	Fc-gamma receptor signaling pathway involved in phagocytosis; cellular glucose homeostasis; response to endoplasmic reticulum stress; Fc-epsilon receptor signaling pathway; phosphatidylinositol phosphate biosynthetic process; vascular endothelial growth factor receptor signaling pathway; regulation of autophagy; regulation of phosphatidylinositol 3-kinase activity; cellular response to insulin stimulus; protein transport; phosphatidylinositol 3-kinase signaling; T cell receptor signaling pathway; regulation of small GTPase mediated signal transduction; phosphatidylinositol-mediated signaling; leukocyte migration; positive regulation of transcription by RNA polymerase II; signal transduction; insulin receptor signaling pathway; positive regulation of GTPase activity; phosphatidylinositol-3-phosphate biosynthetic process; negative regulation of MAPK cascade; positive regulation of protein kinase B signaling; positive regulation of protein import into nucleus; phosphatidylinositol biosynthetic process
Sources:Amigo / QuickGO
Orthologs
Databases	NCBI: entry
Species	Human	Mouse
Entrez	5296	18709
Ensembl	n/a	ENSMUSG00000031834
UniProt	O00459	O08908
RefSeq (mRNA)	NM_005027	NM_008841
RefSeq (protein)	NP_005018	NP_032867
Location (UCSC)	n/a	Chr 8: 71.22 – 71.23 Mb
PubMed search
- Wikidata
View/Edit Human	View/Edit Mouse

Phosphatidylinositol 3-kinase regulatory subunit beta is an enzyme that in humans is encoded by the PIK3R2 gene.

A recent study on gene expression indicated that the PIK3R2 gene might have a key role in pan-cancer prognosis.

== Interactions ==
PIK3R2 has been shown to interact with:

- CRKL
- Cbl gene,
- Epidermal growth factor,
- FYN,
- HER2/neu,
- Macrophage colony-stimulating factor, and
- PIK3CD.

== Clinical relevance ==
PIK3R2 mutations were recently shown to be associated with polymicrogyria.
