= PIK3R5 =

Protein-coding gene in the species Homo sapiens

Identifiers
- Aliases: PIK3R5, F730038I15Rik, FOAP-2, P101-PI3K, p101, phosphoinositide-3-kinase regulatory subunit 5
- External IDs: OMIM: 611317; MGI: 2443588; HomoloGene: 8627; GeneCards: PIK3R5; OMA:PIK3R5 - orthologs

Gene location (Human)
Chr.	Chromosome 17 (human)
Band	17p13.1	Start	8,878,911 bp
Band	17p13.1	End	8,965,712 bp

Gene location (Mouse)
Chr.	Chromosome 11 (mouse)
Band	11|11 B3	Start	68,322,947 bp
Band	11|11 B3	End	68,388,675 bp
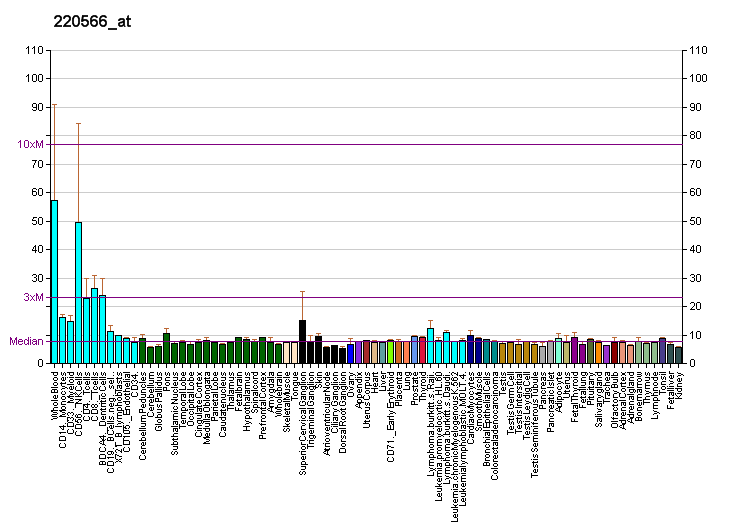
RNA expression pattern
Bgee	Human / Mouse (ortholog); Top expressed in: granulocyte; blood; monocyte; spleen; bone marrow cells; upper lobe of left lung; lymph node; right lung; appendix; gallbladder / Top expressed in: granulocyte; thymus; blood; mesenteric lymph nodes; stroma of bone marrow; spleen; outer nuclear layer; otic vesicle; subcutaneous adipose tissue; lumbar subsegment of spinal cord; More reference expression data
BioGPS	More reference expression data
Gene ontology
Molecular function	G-protein beta/gamma-subunit complex binding; phosphatidylinositol-4,5-bisphosphate 3-kinase activity; 1-phosphatidylinositol-3-kinase regulator activity
Cellular component	cytoplasm; plasma membrane; phosphatidylinositol 3-kinase complex, class IB; membrane; nucleus; phosphatidylinositol 3-kinase complex; microtubule organizing center; cytosol
Biological process	platelet activation; positive regulation of protein kinase B signaling; regulation of phosphatidylinositol 3-kinase activity; positive regulation of MAP kinase activity; phosphatidylinositol 3-kinase signaling; phosphatidylinositol phosphate biosynthetic process; G protein-coupled receptor signaling pathway; positive regulation of phosphatidylinositol 3-kinase signaling; phosphatidylinositol biosynthetic process
Sources:Amigo / QuickGO
Orthologs
Species	Human	Mouse
Entrez	23533	320207
Ensembl	ENSG00000141506	ENSMUSG00000020901
UniProt	Q8WYR1	Q5SW28
RefSeq (mRNA)	NM_001142633; NM_001251851; NM_001251852; NM_001251853; NM_001251855 NM_014308; NM_001388396; NM_001388397; NM_001388398; NM_001388399; NM_001388400	NM_177320
RefSeq (protein)	NP_001136105; NP_001238780; NP_001238781; NP_001238782; NP_001238784 NP_055123	NP_796294.2; NP_796294
Location (UCSC)	Chr 17: 8.88 – 8.97 Mb	Chr 11: 68.32 – 68.39 Mb
PubMed search
- Wikidata
View/Edit Human	View/Edit Mouse

Phosphoinositide 3-kinase regulatory subunit 5 is an enzyme that in humans is encoded by the PIK3R5 gene.

== Interactions ==
PIK3R5 has been shown to interact with PIK3CG.
