= PIK3CG =

Protein-coding gene in the species Homo sapiens

Identifiers
- Aliases: PIK3CG, PI3CG, PI3K, PI3Kgamma, PIK3, p110gamma, p120-PI3K, phosphatidylinositol-4,5-bisphosphate 3-kinase catalytic subunit gamma, IMD97
- External IDs: OMIM: 601232; MGI: 1353576; GeneCards: PIK3CG
Available structures
PDB	Ortholog search: PDBe RCSB
PDB	List of PDB id codes 1E8Y, 1E8Z, 1HE8, 2A4Z, 2A5U, 2CHW, 2CHX, 2CHZ, 2V4L, 3APC, 3APD, 3APF, 3CSF, 3CST, 3DBS, 3ENE, 3IBE, 3L08, 3L13, 3L16, 3L17, 3L54, 3LJ3, 3MJW, 3ML8, 3ML9, 3NZS, 3NZU, 3OAW, 3P2B, 3PRE, 3PRZ, 3PS6, 3QAQ, 3QAR, 3QJZ, 3QK0, 3R7Q, 3R7R, 3S2A, 3SD5, 3T8M, 3TJP, 3TL5, 3ZVV, 3ZW3, 4ANU, 4ANV, 4ANW, 4ANX, 4AOF, 4DK5, 4EZJ, 4EZK, 4EZL, 4F1S, 4FA6, 4FAD, 4FHJ, 4FHK, 4FJY, 4FJZ, 4FLH, 4FUL, 4G11, 4GB9, 4HLE, 4HVB, 4J6I, 4KZ0, 4KZC, 4PS3, 4PS7, 4PS8, 4URK, 4WWN, 4WWO, 4WWP, 4XX5, 4XZ4, 5EDS, 5G2N
Enzyme activity
EC #	BRENDA	ExPASy	KEGG	MetaCyc
2.7.1.137	↗	↗	↗	↗
2.7.1.153	↗	↗	↗	↗
2.7.1.154	↗	↗	↗	↗
2.7.11.1	↗	↗	↗	↗

Gene location (Human)
Chr.	Chromosome 7 (human)
Band	7q22.3	Start	106,865,278 bp
Band	7q22.3	End	106,908,980 bp

Gene location (Mouse)
Chr.	Chromosome 12 (mouse)
Band	12|12 A3	Start	32,223,472 bp
Band	12|12 A3	End	32,258,658 bp
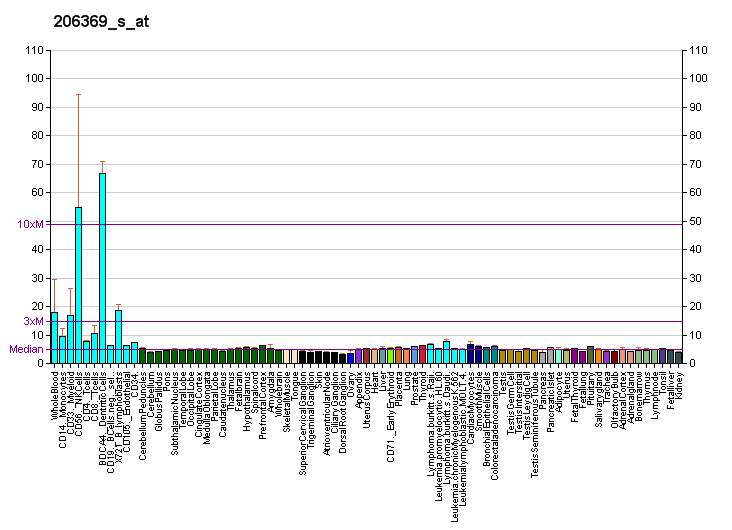

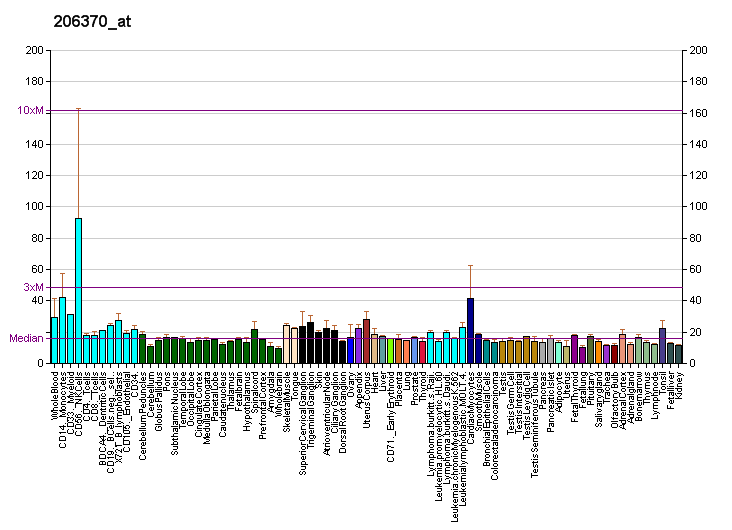
RNA expression pattern
Bgee	Human / Mouse (ortholog); Top expressed in: bone marrow; trabecular bone; bone marrow cell; blood; monocyte; epithelium of nasopharynx; granulocyte; lymph node; testicle; visceral pleura / Top expressed in: granulocyte; tibiofemoral joint; blood; thymus; lumbar subsegment of spinal cord; bone marrow; spleen; stroma of bone marrow; lymph node; mesenteric lymph nodes; More reference expression data
BioGPS	More reference expression data
Gene ontology
Molecular function	transferase activity; protein kinase activity; nucleotide binding; ephrin receptor binding; 1-phosphatidylinositol-4-phosphate 3-kinase activity; protein serine/threonine kinase activity; protein binding; phosphatidylinositol 3-kinase activity; ATP binding; phosphatidylinositol-4,5-bisphosphate 3-kinase activity; kinase activity; 1-phosphatidylinositol-3-kinase activity; identical protein binding; phosphatidylinositol-3,4-bisphosphate 5-kinase activity
Cellular component	cytoplasm; phosphatidylinositol 3-kinase complex; membrane; phosphatidylinositol 3-kinase complex, class IB; cytosol; mast cell granule; plasma membrane
Biological process	regulation of protein phosphorylation; G protein-coupled receptor signaling pathway; positive regulation of protein kinase B signaling; regulation of cell adhesion mediated by integrin; endocytosis; adaptive immune response; respiratory burst involved in defense response; positive regulation of MAP kinase activity; immune system process; positive regulation of cytosolic calcium ion concentration; T cell chemotaxis; cytokine production; positive regulation of catalytic activity; secretory granule localization; dendritic cell chemotaxis; neutrophil chemotaxis; platelet activation; T cell proliferation; chemotaxis; protein phosphorylation; phosphatidylinositol-3-phosphate biosynthetic process; phosphatidylinositol phosphate biosynthetic process; natural killer cell chemotaxis; angiogenesis; positive regulation of acute inflammatory response; phosphatidylinositol biosynthetic process; negative regulation of fibroblast apoptotic process; phosphatidylinositol 3-kinase signaling; negative regulation of triglyceride catabolic process; mast cell degranulation; inflammatory response; innate immune response; platelet aggregation; neutrophil extravasation; T cell activation; regulation of calcium ion transmembrane transport; cellular response to cAMP; hepatocyte apoptotic process; phosphatidylinositol-mediated signaling; negative regulation of cardiac muscle contraction; phosphorylation; positive regulation of phosphatidylinositol 3-kinase signaling; cell migration
Sources:Amigo / QuickGO
Orthologs
Databases	NCBI: entry; OMA: entry
Species	Human	Mouse
Entrez	5294	30955
Ensembl	ENSG00000105851	ENSMUSG00000020573
UniProt	P48736	Q9JHG7
RefSeq (mRNA)	NM_001282426; NM_001282427; NM_002649	NM_001146200; NM_001146201; NM_020272
RefSeq (protein)	NP_001269355; NP_001269356; NP_002640	NP_001139672; NP_001139673; NP_064668
Location (UCSC)	Chr 7: 106.87 – 106.91 Mb	Chr 12: 32.22 – 32.26 Mb
PubMed search
- Wikidata
View/Edit Human	View/Edit Mouse

Phosphatidylinositol-4,5-bisphosphate 3-kinase catalytic subunit gamma isoform is an enzyme that in humans is encoded by the PIK3CG gene.

== Function ==
This gene encodes a protein that belongs to the pi3/pi4-kinase family of proteins. The gene product is an enzyme that phosphorylates phosphoinositides on the 3-hydroxyl group of the inositol ring. It is an important modulator of extracellular signals, including those elicited by E-cadherin-mediated cell-cell adhesion, which plays an important role in maintenance of the structural and functional integrity of epithelia. In addition to its role in promoting assembly of adherens junctions, the protein is thought to play a pivotal role in the regulation of cytotoxicity in NK cells. The gene is located in a commonly deleted segment of chromosome 7 previously identified in myeloid leukemias. More recently, this gene has been shown to be a critical myeloid-restricted vulnerability in Acute Myeloid Leukemia (AML). Its targeting, either by the small-molecule inhibitor IPI-549 or by a first-in-class proteolysis-targeting chimera (PROTAC) named ARM165, has been shown to reduce AML cell progression both in vitro and in vivo.

== Interactions ==
PIK3CG has been shown to interact with:

- BCR gene,
- KRAS,
- PIK3CD, and
- PIK3R5.

== See also ==
- Class I PI 3-kinases
- p87PIKAP
