= PIK3R6 =

Mammalian protein found in Homo sapiens

Identifiers
- Aliases: PIK3R6, C17orf38, HsT41028, p84 PIKAP, p87(PIKAP), p87PIKAP, phosphoinositide-3-kinase regulatory subunit 6
- External IDs: OMIM: 611462; MGI: 2144613; GeneCards: PIK3R6

Gene location (Human)
Chr.	Chromosome 17 (human)
Band	17p13.1	Start	8,802,722 bp
Band	17p13.1	End	8,867,677 bp

Gene location (Mouse)
Chr.	Chromosome 11 (mouse)
Band	11|11 B3	Start	68,393,845 bp
Band	11|11 B3	End	68,443,524 bp
RNA expression pattern
Bgee	Human / Mouse (ortholog); Top expressed in: granulocyte; monocyte; testicle; spleen; appendix; apex of heart; blood; gonad; gallbladder; lymph node / Top expressed in: granulocyte; carotid body; renal corpuscle; lumbar spinal ganglion; bone marrow; Paneth cell; morula; substantia nigra; central gray substance of midbrain; nucleus of stria terminalis; More reference expression data
BioGPS	n/a
Gene ontology
Molecular function	protein binding; phosphatidylinositol-4,5-bisphosphate 3-kinase activity; 1-phosphatidylinositol-3-kinase regulator activity
Cellular component	cytoplasm; cytosol; plasma membrane; phosphatidylinositol 3-kinase complex, class IB; membrane; phosphatidylinositol 3-kinase complex
Biological process	platelet activation; positive regulation of T cell differentiation; phosphatidylinositol phosphate biosynthetic process; regulation of phosphatidylinositol 3-kinase activity; angiogenesis; positive regulation of angiogenesis; regulation of natural killer cell mediated cytotoxicity; phosphatidylinositol 3-kinase signaling; positive regulation of MAP kinase activity; G protein-coupled receptor signaling pathway; phosphatidylinositol biosynthetic process
Sources:Amigo / QuickGO
Orthologs
Databases	NCBI: entry; OMA: entry
Species	Human	Mouse
Entrez	146850	104709
Ensembl	ENSG00000276231	ENSMUSG00000046207
UniProt	Q5UE93	Q3U6Q4
RefSeq (mRNA)	NM_001010855; NM_001290211	NM_001004435; NM_001081566
RefSeq (protein)	NP_001010855; NP_001277140	NP_001004435; NP_001075035
Location (UCSC)	Chr 17: 8.8 – 8.87 Mb	Chr 11: 68.39 – 68.44 Mb
PubMed search
- Wikidata
View/Edit Human	View/Edit Mouse

Phosphoinositide 3-kinase regulatory subunit 6 (also called p87^{PIKAP}) is a protein that in humans is encoded by the PIK3R6 gene. The PIK3R6 protein is a regulatory subunit of phosphoinositide 3-kinase-γ (PI3Kγ), which functions as an enzyme (a lipid kinase) that is activated by membrane receptors. PIK3R6 is highly expressed in the heart and is present in dendritic cells, macrophages, and neutrophils. It is also referred to as p84 and p87. Some studies have found PIK3R6 to have a role in carcinogenesis.
