= PIK3R4 =

Protein-coding gene in the species Homo sapiens

Identifiers
- Aliases: PIK3R4, VPS15, p150, phosphoinositide-3-kinase regulatory subunit 4
- External IDs: OMIM: 602610; MGI: 1922919; GeneCards: PIK3R4
Enzyme activity
EC #	BRENDA	ExPASy	KEGG	MetaCyc
2.7.11.1	↗	↗	↗	↗

Gene location (Human)
Chr.	Chromosome 3 (human)
Band	3q22.1	Start	130,678,934 bp
Band	3q22.1	End	130,746,829 bp

Gene location (Mouse)
Chr.	Chromosome 9 (mouse)
Band	9 F1|9 56.79 cM	Start	105,520,177 bp
Band	9 F1|9 56.79 cM	End	105,564,856 bp
RNA expression pattern
Bgee	Human / Mouse (ortholog); Top expressed in: right lobe of liver; gonad; anterior pituitary; epithelium of colon; right lobe of thyroid gland; Brodmann area 9; epithelium of nasopharynx; ventricular zone; mucosa of transverse colon; left lobe of thyroid gland / Top expressed in: primary oocyte; secondary oocyte; zygote; Epithelium of choroid plexus; otic vesicle; motor neuron; medullary collecting duct; iris; facial motor nucleus; tail of embryo; More reference expression data
BioGPS	n/a
Gene ontology
Molecular function	transferase activity; protein kinase activity; nucleotide binding; kinase activity; protein serine/threonine kinase activity; protein binding; ATP binding; 1-phosphatidylinositol-3-kinase activity
Cellular component	cytosol; endosome; late endosome; phagocytic vesicle membrane; membrane; phosphatidylinositol 3-kinase complex, class III; nuclear pore; autophagosome; phosphatidylinositol 3-kinase complex, class III, type I; axoneme; nucleus-vacuole junction; cytoplasmic vesicle; phosphatidylinositol 3-kinase complex, class III, type II; microtubule cytoskeleton; intracellular membrane-bounded organelle
Biological process	cellular response to glucose starvation; regulation of cytokinesis; phosphorylation; late endosome to vacuole transport; autophagy of peroxisome; receptor catabolic process; positive regulation of phosphatidylinositol 3-kinase activity; protein phosphorylation; phosphatidylinositol biosynthetic process; protein targeting to vacuole; toll-like receptor 9 signaling pathway; macroautophagy; phosphatidylinositol-3-phosphate biosynthetic process
Sources:Amigo / QuickGO
Orthologs
Databases	NCBI: entry; OMA: entry
Species	Human	Mouse
Entrez	30849	75669
Ensembl	ENSG00000196455	ENSMUSG00000032571
UniProt	Q99570	Q8VD65
RefSeq (mRNA)	NM_014602	NM_001081309; NM_029380
RefSeq (protein)	NP_055417	NP_001074778
Location (UCSC)	Chr 3: 130.68 – 130.75 Mb	Chr 9: 105.52 – 105.56 Mb
PubMed search
- Wikidata
View/Edit Human	View/Edit Mouse

Phosphoinositide 3-kinase regulatory subunit 4, also known as PI3-kinase regulatory subunit 4 or PI3-kinase p150 subunit or phosphoinositide 3-kinase adaptor protein, or VPS15 is an enzyme that in humans is encoded by the PIK3R4 gene.
