= Phosphoinositide 3-kinase inhibitor =

Medical drug glass

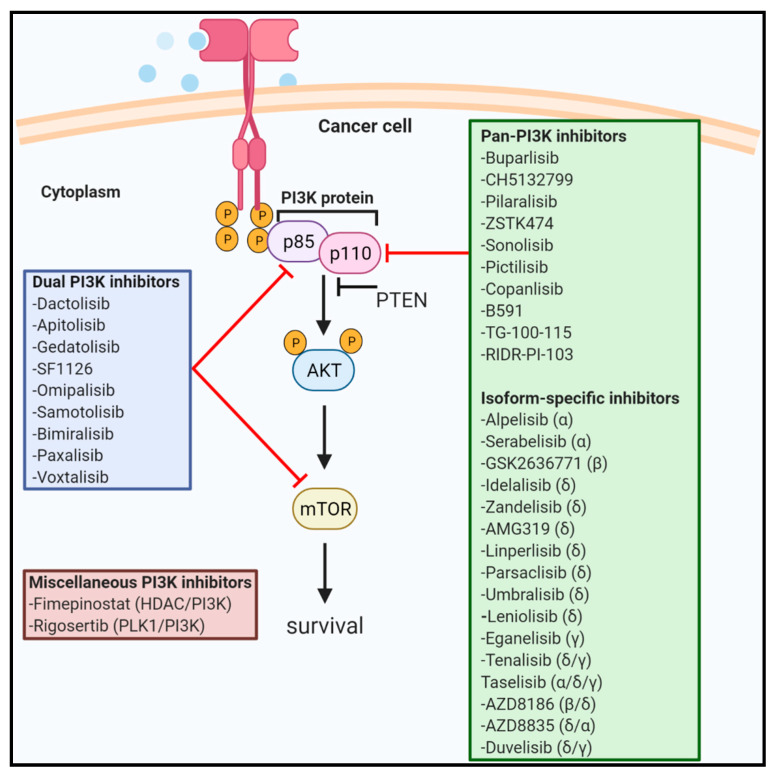
Overview of phosphoinositide 3-kinase (PI3K) inhibitors and their interaction with the PI3K/AKT/mTOR pathway. There are pan-class I PI3K inhibitors such as copanlisib, isoform-specific PI3K inhibitors such as idelalisib, and dual PI3K/mTOR inhibitors such as dactolisib. Note that fimepinostat and rigosertib inhibit the PI3K/AKT/mTOR pathway, but not PI3K itself.

Phosphoinositide 3-kinase inhibitors (PI3K inhibitors) are a class of medical drugs that are mainly used to treat advanced cancers. They function by inhibiting one or more of the phosphoinositide 3-kinase (PI3K) enzymes, which are part of the PI3K/AKT/mTOR pathway. This signal pathway regulates cellular functions such as growth and survival. It is strictly regulated in healthy cells, but is always active in many cancer cells, allowing the cancer cells to better survive and multiply. PI3K inhibitors block the PI3K/AKT/mTOR pathway and thus slow down cancer growth. They are examples of a targeted therapy. While PI3K inhibitors are an effective treatment, they can have very severe side effects and are therefore only used if other treatments have failed or are not suitable.

After PI3K inhibitors had been under investigation as anti-cancer drugs for several years, the first one to be approved for treatment in clinical practice was idelalisib in 2014. Several others followed, and even more are still under development (see below).

There are different classes and isoforms of PI3Ks. Class 1 PI3Ks have a catalytic subunit known as p110, with four types (isoforms) – p110 alpha (PIK3CA), p110 beta (PIK3CB), p110 gamma (PIK3CG) and p110 delta (PIK3CD). All PI3K inhibitors that are currently approved inhibit one or more p110 isoforms of the class I PI3Ks. Inhibiting different p110 isoforms can have different effects, e.g. PTEN-negative tumors may be more sensitive to PIK3CB inhibitors.

PI3K inhibitors are also under investigation as treatments for inflammatory respiratory disease, and are used to investigate the role of the PI3K pathway in aging.

== Approved for treatment ==
- Idelalisib (trade name Zydelig; codenamed CAL-101, GS-1101; PIK3CD inhibitor): FDA-approved in July 2014 for treatment of three types of blood cancers: treatment of relapsed or refractory chronic lymphocytic leukemia (CLL) in combination with rituximab, treatment of relapsed small lymphocytic lymphoma after at least two prior systemic therapies, and treatment of follicular lymphoma (FL) after at least two prior systemic therapies.
- Copanlisib (trade name Aliqopa; codenamed BAY 80-6946; predominantly a PIK3CA and PIK3CD inhibitor): FDA-approved in September 2017 for treatment of relapsed follicular lymphoma after at least two prior systemic therapies.
- Duvelisib (trade name Copiktra; codenamed INK1197, IPI-145; PIK3CD and PIK3CG inhibitor): FDA-approved on 24 September 2018 for treatment of relapsed or refractory chronic lymphocytic leukemia/small lymphocytic lymphoma (CLL/SLL) after at least two prior therapies, and treatment of relapsed or refractory follicular lymphoma after at least two prior systemic therapies.
- Alpelisib (trade names Piqray and Pivikto; codenamed BYL719; PIK3CA inhibitor): FDA-approved in May 2019 for treatment of HR-positive and HER2/neu-negative breast cancer in combination with the endocrine therapy fulvestrant.
- Umbralisib (trade name Ukoniq; codenamed TGR-1202, Rp-5264; PIK3CD and casein kinase CSNK1E inhibitor): FDA-approved in February 2021 for treatment of relapsed or refractory marginal zone lymphoma (MZL) after at least one prior anti-CD20-based regimen, and treatment of relapsed or refractory follicular lymphoma after at least three prior lines of systemic therapy. As of May 31, 2022, umbralisib was withdrawn from the US market due to the decrement in overall survival and increased serious adverse events when using umbralisib.
- Leniolisib (codenamed CDZ173; PIK3CD inhibitor, trade name Joenja) was tested as a potential treatment for activated PI3K delta syndrome (APDS) / PASLI disease in a placebo-controlled phase II/III trial (NCT02435173). The trial was completed in August 2021 and results have become available in March 2022. Another phase II/III trial for APDS/PASLI that serves as an extension study (NCT02859727) is still ongoing and results are expected for October 2026. The FDA has approved leniolisib on March 24, 2023.
- Inavolisib (trade name Itovebi; codenamed GDC-0077; PI3K-alpha inhibitor): FDA-approved on 10 October 2024 for treatment of PIK3CA-mutated, HR-positive, and HER2-negative breast cancer in combination with palbociclib (CDK4/6 inhibitor) and fulvestrant.

== Under clinical development ==
=== Late stage ===
In phase III clinical trials:

- Buparlisib (codenamed BKM120, NVP-BKM120; pan-class I PI3K inhibitor):
  - The phase III trial BURAN compares buparlisib + paclitaxel to paclitaxel alone in patients with head and neck squamous cell carcinoma (HNSCC). Results are expected for December 2022.
  - The phase III trials BELLE-2 and BELLE-3 comparing buparlisib + fulvestrant with fulvestrant alone in patients with breast cancer both showed excessive side effects. The phase II/III trial BELLE-4 comparing buparlisib + paclitaxel with paclitaxel alone in patients with breast cancer did not improve progression-free survival and was stopped for futility at the end of phase II. These results led the sponsor, Novartis, to cancel their breast cancer study program with buparlisib.
- Copanlisib (codenamed BAY 80-6946; predominantly a PIK3CA and PIK3CD inhibitor) ist currently undergoing three phase III trials, all of which are testing it in patients with indolent non-Hodgkin lymphoma (iNHL):
  - The trial CHRONOS-2 was planned as a placebo-controlled randomized phase III trial with about 190 patients. However, recruitment was stopped after 25 patients were included and the trial continues as a non-randomized single-arm trial. Results are expected for November 2022.
  - The phase III trial CHRONOS-3 compares copanlisib + rituximab with placebo + rituximab in patients with relapsed iNHL. Study completion is expected for January 2023. Preliminary results show a strong and significant improvement of progression-free survival under copanlisib treatment, but also considerably more severe and serious side effects.
  - The phase III trial CHRONOS-4 compares copanlisib + immunochemotherapy (R-CHOP regimen) with placebo + immunochemotherapy in patients with relapsed iNHL who have received 1–3 previous lines of therapy. Results are expected for February 2023.
- Dactolisib (codenamed BEZ235, NVP-BEZ235; dual pan-class I PI3K and mTOR inhibitor) was tested in the placebo-controlled phase III trial PROTECTOR 1 (RTB-101-204) to prevent clinically symptomatic respiratory illness in generally healthy elderly people. However, the trial did not meet this endpoint. Consequently, the related phase III trial PROTECTOR 2 (RTB-101-205) was terminated by the sponsor. Dactolisib has also undergone several phase II trials as a potential treatment for solid tumours as well as for respiratory diseases, most of which have been terminated as of 2022.
- Duvelisib (codenamed INK1197, IPI-145; PIK3CD and PIK3CG inhibitor):
  - The results of the completed pivotal phase III trial DUO comparing duvelisib monotherapy with ofatumumab led to its approval for CLL/SLL An extension trial to DUO was completed in 2020, but its results have not yet been published.
  - The phase III trial BRAVURA comparing duvelisib + rituximab + bendamustine with rituximab + bendamustine in patients with non-Hodgkin lymphoma was withdrawn by the sponsor when it was no longer expected to lead to approval.
  - Similarly, the phase III trial DYNAMO + R comparing duvelisib + rituximab with rituximab alone in patients with follicular lymphoma was terminated by the sponsor when it was no longer expected to lead to approval.
- Idelalisib has undergone eleven phase III clinical trials as of March 2022. These include the pivotal trial GS-US-312-0116 that lead to approval of idelalisib by FDA and EMA for treatment of patients with CLL. All other phase III trials testing idelalisib-based therapy as an experimental treatment, e.g. in first-line CLL and second-line NHL, had been terminated by end of 2016, mainly due to increased toxicity and mortality. Two trials comparing new experimental treatments to idelalisib as a comparator and a dose optimization study in FL are still ongoing.
- Parsaclisib (codenamed INCB050465, INCB 50465; PIK3CD inhibitor) will be tested as a potential treatment for different diseases in five phase III trials:
  - Follicular lymphoma (FL) and marginal zone lymphoma (MZL) in the phase III trial CITADEL-302
  - Mantle cell lymphoma (MCL) in the phase III trial CITADEL-310
  - Myelofibrosis in the phase III trials LIMBER-304 and LIMBER-313
  - Warm antibody autoimmune hemolytic anemia (WAIHA) in the phase III trial PATHWAY
- Paxalisib (codenamed GDC-0084; pan-class I PI3K and mTOR inhibitor) was tested as a potential treatment for newly diagnosed, unmethylated as well as recurrent glioblastoma in the phase II/III trial GBM AGILE. Kazia reported positive study results for the newly diagnosed, unmethylated population in the concurrent analysis which compares patients treated with paxalisib between January 2021 and March 2022 with those treated with temozolomide during the same time. The results showed a clinically meaningful increase in medium overall survival of 3.8 months, representing an increase of 33% vs. the temozolomide arm which is currently the standard of care. Kazia PR July 2024
- Taselisib (codenamed GDC-0032, RG7604; beta-sparing PI3K inhibitor): Development was discontinued due to side effects and only a minor progression-free survival benefit in the phase III trial SANDPIPER in patients with breast cancer.
- Zandelisib (codenamed ME-401; PIK3CD inhibitor) will be tested as a potential treatment for iNHL in the phase III trial COASTAL. The trial is currently recruiting patients as of March 2022 and will compare zandelisib + rituximab to chemotherapy (CHOP regimen) + rituximab. Results are expected for April 2026.
- Inavolisib (codenamed GDC-0077; PI3K-alpha inhibitor) continues to be tested in PIK3CA-mutated solid tumors in multiple phase II/III trials as of July 2026.

In phase II clinical trials:

- Apitolisib (codenamed GDC-0980, GNE 390, RG7422; pan-class I PI3K and mTOR inhibitor) has undergone four phase II trials as a potential treatment for different solid tumours, three of which have been completed or terminated as of March 2022.
- Bimiralisib (codenamed PQR309; brain-permeant dual PI3K/mTOR inhibitor) has undergone several phase II trials as a potential treatment for different solid tumours, all of which have been completed or terminated as of March 2022.
- Eganelisib (codenamed IPI-549; PIK3CD inhibitor) is currently undergoing three phase II trials as a potential treatment for different solid tumours, with no published results as of March 2022.
- Fimepinostat (codenamed CUDC-907; PI3K p110 and HDAC inhibitor): A phase II trial in patients with diffuse large B-cell lymphoma (DLBCL) was completed in 2019 but its results have not yet been published. Other phase II trials with fimepinostat have been terminated.
- Gedatolisib (codenamed PF-05212384, PKI-587; PIK3CA, PIK3CG and mTOR inhibitor) has undergone several phase II trials as a potential treatment for different cancers, most of which have been terminated for different reasons. As of March 2022, two phase II trials on breast cancer are still recruiting patients.
- Linperlisib (codenamed YY-20394; PIK3CD inhibitor) will be tested as a potential treatment for different types of lymphoma in several phase II trials that are currently recruiting or scheduled to recruit patients as of March 2022.
- Nemiralisib (codenamed GSK2269557; PIK3CD inhibitor) has undergone several phase II trials as a potential treatment for different respiratory diseases (asthma and COPD) as well as for APDS/PASLI, all of which have been completed or terminated as of March 2022. Results are available for all of these trials.
- Pictilisib (codenamed GDC-0941; pan-class I PI3K inhibitor) has undergone five phase II trials as a potential treatment for different solid tumours, with no results published as of March 2022.
- Pilaralisib (codenamed SAR245408 and XL147; inhibitor of PIK3CA, PIK3CD, and PIK3CG) has undergone several phase II trials as a potential treatment for different solid tumours, all of which have been completed as of 2022.
- Samotolisib (codenamed GTPL8918, LY3023414; triple pan-class I PI3K, mTOR, and DNA-PK inhibitor) has undergone several phase II trials as a potential treatment for different cancers, three of which have been completed or terminated and have results as of March 2022.
- Seletalisib (codenamed UCB-5857; PIK3CD inhibitor) has undergone one phase II trial as a potential treatment for Sjögren syndrome. The trial has been terminated due to enrolment challenges.
- Serabelisib (codenamed MLN1117 and TAK-117; PIK3CA inhibitor) is undergoing several phase II trials as a potential treatment for different cancers. As of March 2022, results have been reported for renal cell carcinoma and endometrial cancer.
- Sonolisib (codenamed PX-866; a wortmannin derivative) has undergone several phase II trials as a potential treatment for different solid tumours, all of which have been completed or terminated as of 2022.
- Tenalisib (codenamed RP6530; dual PIK3CD and PIK3CG inhibitor) is undergoing several phase II trials as a potential treatment for different cancers. Two single-arm trials (in CLL and iNHL) have reported results.
- Voxtalisib (codenamed SAR245409, XL765; pan-class I PI3K inhibitor and weaker inhibitor of mTOR), in trial for B-cell lymphomas, e.g. CLL and follicular lymphoma.
- AMG 319 (PIK3CD inhibitor) has undergone a phase II trial as a potential treatment for HNSCC. The trial was terminated in 2018 due to safety reasons.
- AZD8186 (PIK3CB and PIK3CD inhibitor) will be tested as a potential treatment for gastric cancer in a phase II trial that is currently recruiting patients as of March 2022.
- GSK2636771 (PIK3CB inhibitor) has undergone several phase II trials as a potential treatment for different cancers, one of which have been completed, with no results published as of March 2022.
- SF1126 is a peptidic prodrug targeting integrin receptors that converts to LY294002, one of the most widely studied dual PI3K/mTOR inhibitors. A phase II trial with SF1126 has been terminated due to slow enrolment.

=== Early stage ===
In early stage clinical trials

- Acalisib (codenamed CAL-120, GS-9820) has completed one phase I trial in 2016. No data have been published for this trial and no further trials have been conducted since then as of March 2022.
- Omipalisib (codenamed GSK2126458, GSK458) has completed two phase I trials in 2015 and 2016, respectively. No data have been published for these trials and no further trials have been conducted since then as of March 2022.
- AZD8835 (PIK3CA and PIK3CD inhibitor) has completed one phase I trial in 2016. No data have been published for this trial and no further trials have been conducted since then as of March 2022.
- CAL263 (PIK3CD inhibitor)
- GSK1059615 (dual pan-class I PI3K and mTOR inhibitor): The phase I trial of this drug was terminated due to lack of sufficient exposure following single- and repeat-dosing.
- MEN1611 (CH5132799, PA799; mainly a PIK3CA inhibitor) will be tested in a phase I/II trial with PIK3CA-mutated colorectal cancer patients that is currently recruiting patients as of March 2022.
- PWT33597 (dual PIK3CA and mTOR inhibitor)
- TG100-115 (mainly a PIK3CD and PIK3CG inhibitor)
- ZSTK474 (mainly a PIK3CD inhibitor)

== Not in clinical trials ==
- AEZS-136 (dual PI3K and ERK inhibitor)
- B591 (pan-class I PI3K inhibitor)
- GNE-477 (dual PIK3CA and mTOR inhibitor with IC_{50} values of 4 nM and 21 nM)
- Hibiscone C (irreversible PI3K inhibitor)
- IC87114 (mainly a PIK3CD inhibitor)
- LY294002 (reversible PI3K inhibitor), mainly used as a research tool
- PI-103 (triple pan-class I PI3K, mTOR, and DNA-PK inhibitor)
- Wortmannin (irreversible PI3K inhibitor), mainly used as a research tool

== See also ==
- PI3K/AKT/mTOR pathway for inhibitors of AKT and mTOR downstream from PI3K
- P110δ#Pharmacology, P110δ (PI3K-delta) as a drug target
