= AMG 319 =

Chemical compound

Clinical data
- ATC code: None

Legal status
- Legal status: Investigational

Identifiers
- IUPAC name: (S)-N-(1-[7-Fluoro-2-(pyridin-2-yl)quinolin-3-yl]ethyl)-9H-purin-6-amine
- CAS Number: 1608125-21-8
- PubChem CID: 68947304
- ChemSpider: 35000181
- UNII: 19DG7G1U5Q
- CompTox Dashboard (EPA): DTXSID501046373

Chemical and physical data
- Formula: C_{21}H_{16}FN_{7}
- Molar mass: 385.406 g·mol^{−1}
- 3D model (JSmol): Interactive image
- SMILES: C[C@@H](c1cc2ccc(cc2nc1c3ccccn3)F)Nc4c5c([nH]cn5)ncn4
- InChI: InChI=1S/C21H16FN7/c1-12(28-21-19-20(25-10-24-19)26-11-27-21)15-8-13-5-6-14(22)9-17(13)29-18(15)16-4-2-3-7-23-16/h2-12H,1H3,(H2,24,25,26,27,28)/t12-/m0/s1; Key:KWRYMZHCQIOOEB-LBPRGKRZSA-N

AMG 319 is a drug developed by Amgen which acts as an inhibitor of the phosphoinositide 3-kinase enzyme subtype PI3Kδ. It was originally developed as an anti-inflammatory drug with potential applications in the treatment of autoimmune conditions such as rheumatoid arthritis, but subsequent research showed that it inhibits cell proliferation and might potentially have useful anti-cancer effects, and it has been put into clinical trials to assess its safety and tolerability in this application.

== Mechanism(s) of action ==
It is a potential immunotherapy because blocking PI3Kδ (PI3K p110δ) eliminates a group of inhibitory immune cells and may allow the immune system to better attack the cancer cells.

== Clinical trials ==
Its first clinical trial was a phase I/II study in adults with relapsed or refractory lymphoid malignancies. This was due to run from 2011 to 2013.

In 2015/16 it started a phase II clinical trial as a neoadjuvant therapy for human papillomavirus (HPV) negative head and neck squamous-cell carcinoma (HNSCC) (prior to resection surgery).

== See also ==
- Duvelisib
- Idelalisib
