= Indolent lymphoma =

- Other names: Low-grade lymphoma
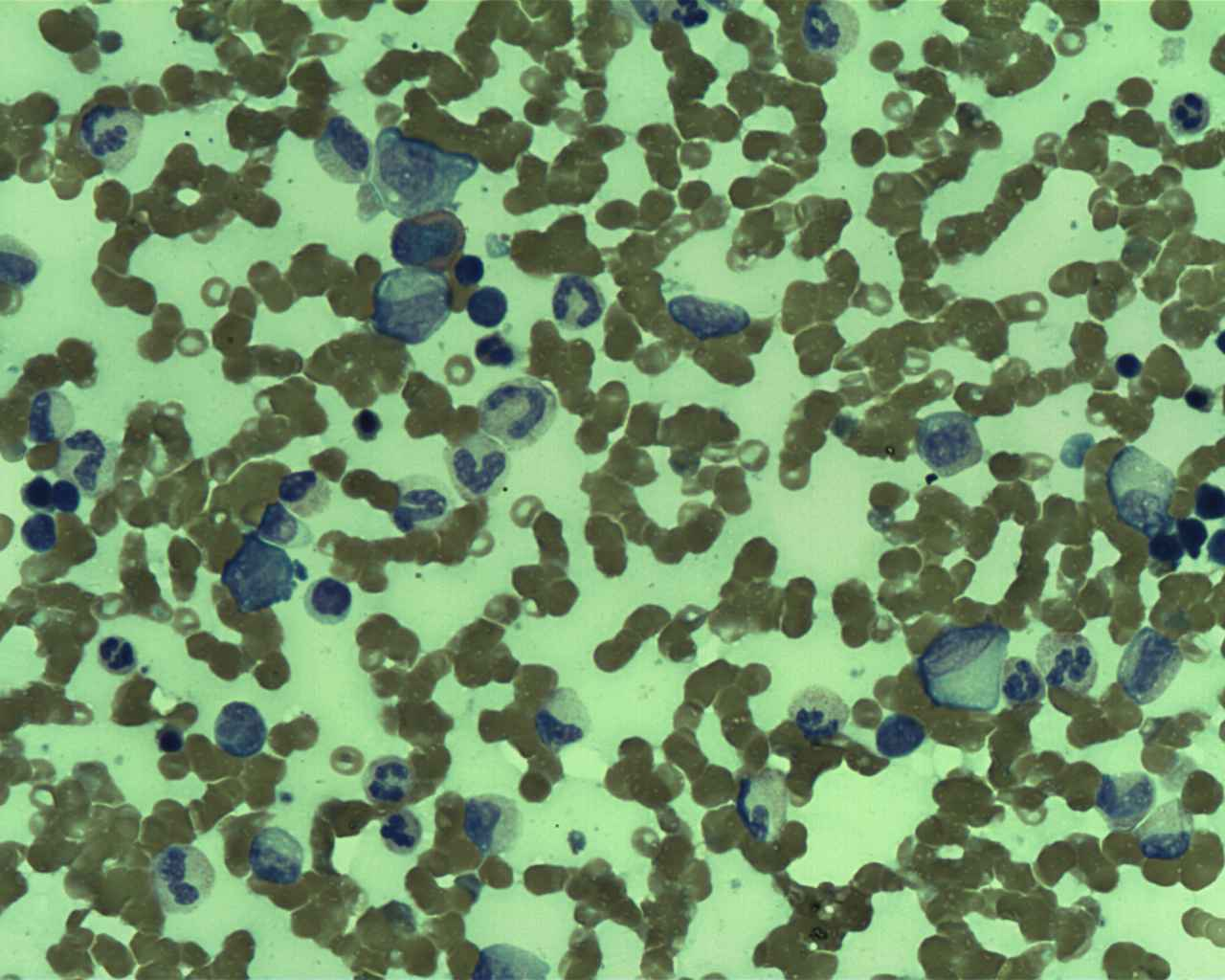
- Follicular lymphoma in the bone marrow
- Specialty: Hematology and oncology
- Symptoms: Swollen lymph nodes, chest or abdominal pain, skin lump
- Usual onset: 60s
- Treatment: Watchful waiting, chemotherapy, radiation therapy, targeted therapy, immunotherapy

Indolent lymphoma, also known as low-grade lymphoma, is a group of slow-growing non-Hodgkin lymphomas (NHLs). Because they spread slowly, they tend to have fewer signs and symptoms when first diagnosed and may not require immediate treatment. Symptoms can include swollen but painless lymph nodes, unexplained fever, and unintended weight loss.

There are several subtypes, the most common of which is follicular lymphoma. Others include cutaneous T-cell lymphoma, marginal zone lymphoma, chronic lymphocytic leukemia, and Waldenström macroglobulinemia.

Indolent lymphoma accounts for 41 percent of all non-Hodgkin lymphoma cases in North America and Northern Europe. It mainly affects older adults, and affects men and women almost equally. White people have higher incidence rates than black and Asian people, but the cause of these disparities is poorly understood.

Indolent lymphoma is usually considered incurable without the use of allogeneic stem cell transplantation, unless the disease is localised. However, due to its slow-growing nature and response to treatment, patients often have prolonged survival.

== Signs and symptoms ==
Patients normally present with painless, swollen lymph nodes, often in the neck, armpit, or groin. Some have swollen lymph nodes inside their body, such as in the chest or abdomen, which can go undetected until they become very large and cause symptoms like cough or abdominal pain.

== Risk factors ==
The cause of indolent lymphoma is unknown, but research has identified a number of factors that increase risk.

=== Age ===
The risk of developing indolent lymphoma increases with age. Although the disease can occur at any age, it mainly affects older adults. It is uncommon in people under age 40 and very rare in children.

=== Infection ===
People with HIV are at slightly higher risk than the general population. For patients who were previously diagnosed with an AIDS-defining illness, the risk of developing indolent lymphoma is 14-fold higher.

=== Other factors ===
First-degree family history of non-Hodgkin lymphoma, hematological malignancy, or hepatitis C infection are linked to an increased risk of indolent lymphoma. There are also specific risk factors for individual subtypes. Higher body mass index (BMI) as a young adult, occupation as a spray painter, sedentary lifestyle, and high levels of dietary animal protein intake are associated with higher risk of follicular lymphoma. Living on a farm is associated with an increased risk of mantle cell lymphoma. Sjögren's syndrome, systemic lupus erythematosus, and tobacco smoking for more than 40 years are linked to an increased risk of Waldenstrom macroglobulinemia.

== Diagnosis ==
=== Classification ===
With a few exceptions, indolent lymphomas are of B cell origin. They are classified based on pathological and cytological features. Subtypes include follicular lymphoma, marginal zone lymphoma, lymphoplasmacytic lymphoma, chronic lymphocytic leukemia, and hairy cell leukemia.

==== Follicular lymphoma ====
Follicular lymphoma (FL) is a lymphoproliferative disorder generally associated with an indolent course. It originates from follicular center B cells. About 85% of cases show t(14;18)(q32;q21) chromosomal translocation, which causes the overexpression of the anti-apoptotic protein Bcl-2.

FL is characterized by diffuse lymphadenopathy, bone marrow involvement, and splenomegaly. Involvement of non-lymphatic areas is less common. Cytopenias are relatively common, but constitutional symptoms such as fever, night sweats, and weight loss are rare in the absence of transformation to diffuse large B cell lymphoma. The five-year survival rate in the United States is 88.4%.

FL is the most prevalent form of indolent lymphoma, accounting for 70% of indolent cases and 20–30% of all non-Hodgkin lymphoma cases, with a yearly incidence of 1.6 to 3.1 per 100,000. It is most frequently diagnosed among people in their 50s and 60s, and is more common among white populations than black or Asian populations.

==== Cutaneous T-cell lymphoma ====
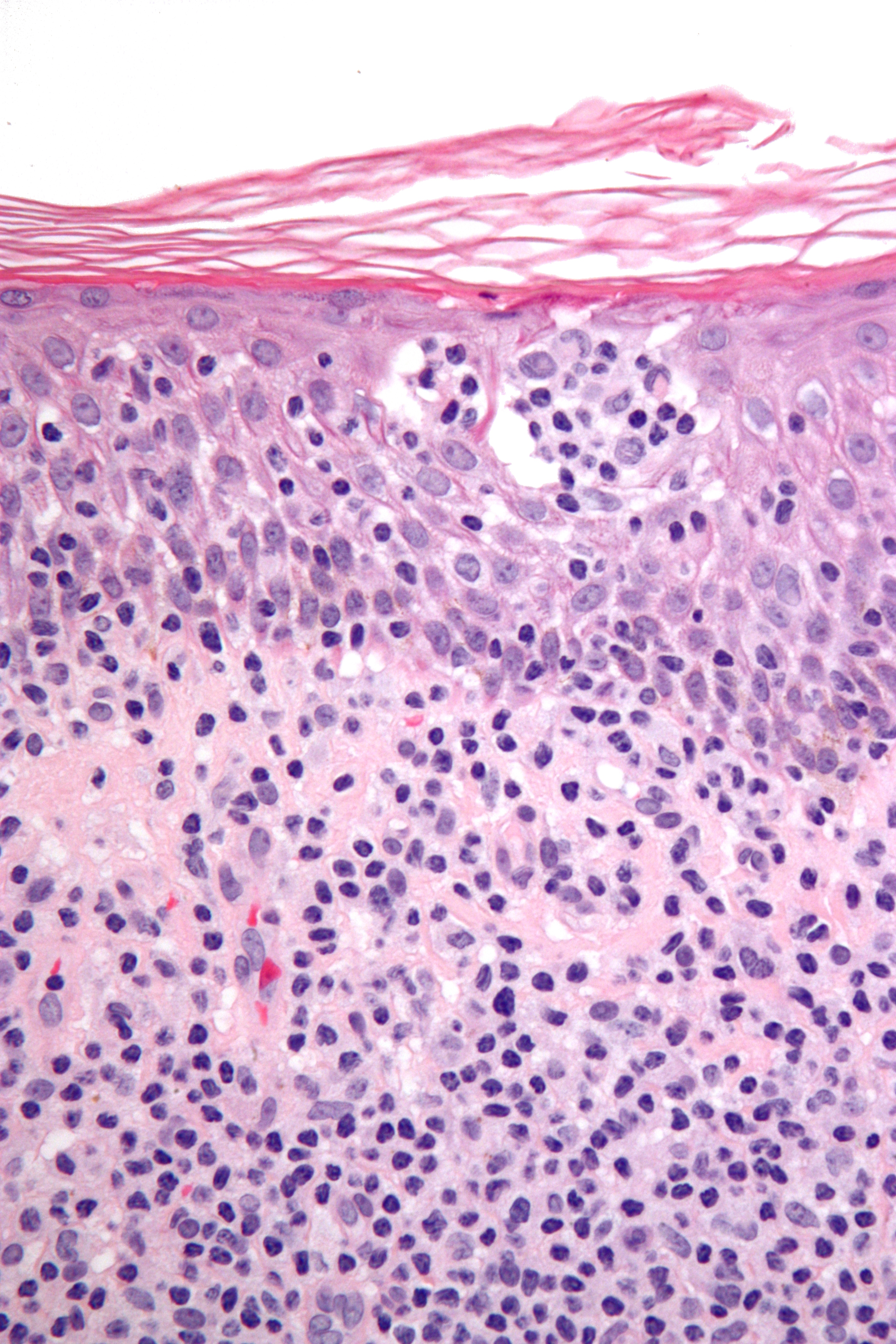
Cutaneous T-cell lymphoma (very high magnification)

Unlike most NHL subtypes, cutaneous T-cell lymphoma (CTCL) is derived from T cells. Mycosis fungoides, which attacks the skin, is the most common form of CTCL. When cancer cells infiltrate and accumulate in the blood, it is known as Sézary syndrome.

Diagnosis of CTCL is often delayed due to the presence of multiple clinical presentations and the lack of definitive diagnostic criteria. Patients can be misdiagnosed with a variety of benign skin conditions, including dermatitis, eczema, parapsoriasis, psoriasis, and adverse drug reactions. It takes six years on average from disease onset to confirmation of diagnosis.

==== Marginal zone lymphoma ====
Marginal zone lymphoma (MZL) is a heterogeneous group of indolent B cell lymphomas that arise from the marginal zone of lymphoid tissues. It accounts for 5–10% of all NHL cases, with an annual incidence of 0.4 to 1.0 per 100,000 in Western countries. The median age at diagnosis is 67 years, and the disease is slightly more common in women than in men.

The World Health Organization categorizes MZL into three subtypes: nodal, extranodal, and splenic. Nodal MZL occurs within the lymph nodes. Extranodal MZL occurs in areas outside the lymph nodes, with the stomach being the most common site. Splenic MZL develops in the spleen and may spread to the blood.

==== Chronic lymphocytic leukemia and small cell lymphocytic lymphoma ====
Chronic lymphocytic leukemia (CLL) and small cell lymphocytic lymphoma (SLL) are different manifestations of the same disease and are managed in the same way. When the abnormal lymphocytes are located mostly in the lymph nodes, it is referred to as SLL; when the abnormal lymphocytes are mostly in the blood and bone marrow, it is called CLL.

CLL is the most common leukemia in Western countries, but it is very rare in East Asia. The median age at diagnosis is 72 years.

=== Staging ===
Staging describes the extent of indolent lymphoma, whether it has spread and, if so, how far it has spread. The disease can spread through tissue, the lymphatic system and the blood. The Lugano modification of the Ann Arbor system is used to stage lymphoma.

Stage I: The lymphoma is in one lymph node or one group of lymph nodes; or, in rare cases, in one organ of the lymphatic system such as Waldeyer's ring, the thymus, or the spleen; or in one site outside the lymphatic system (IE).

Stage II: The lymphoma is in two or more groups of lymph nodes; or in one nearby area outside the lymphatic system, with or without involvement of other lymph nodes (IIE). In either case, the lymphoma sites are on the same side of the diaphragm. In Stage II, "bulky disease" means tumor mass larger than a certain size; the threshold depends on the type of lymphoma.

Stage III: The lymphoma is on both sides of the diaphragm, either in lymph nodes both above and below the diaphragm, or in lymph nodes above the diaphragm and in the spleen.

Stage IV: The lymphoma is in one or more organs beyond the lymphatic system, such as the liver, lungs, bone marrow, or cerebrospinal fluid.

A patient's stage may be determined through blood tests, bone marrow biopsy, chest X-rays, computed tomography (CT) scans, positron emission tomography (PET) scans, and magnetic resonance imaging (MRI).

== Treatment ==
Indolent lymphoma tends to grow slowly. As a result, patients may not need to start treatment immediately upon diagnosis. Instead, they may be closely monitored—an approach known as watchful waiting—and start treatment when the disease progresses and causes symptoms, or when they reach a certain number of cancer cells in their body even if there are no symptoms. Treatment is highly individualized and depends on a range of factors, including the subtype of the disease, its stage, the patient's age, and other medical conditions.

Patients with early-stage indolent lymphoma may be cured with radiation therapy, but most patients have widespread disease at the time of diagnosis. There are many effective treatments to control later stages, but they are not reliably curative. Allogeneic stem cell transplantation can be curative because of the potential for immunologic graft-versus-lymphoma effect, but there are significant concerns regarding non-relapse mortality.

=== Treatment by stage ===
==== Stage I and contiguous Stage II ====
External radiation therapy (or external beam radiation therapy) may be given to affected lymph nodes and nearby lymph nodes. Other treatments include chemotherapy and monoclonal antibody therapy with rituximab.

==== Noncontiguous Stage II, Stage III, and Stage IV ====
Treatments include rituximab, either alone or combined with chemotherapy; obinutuzumab; combination immunotherapy with lenalidomide and rituximab; and radiolabeled monoclonal antibody therapy. Phosphatidylinositol 3-kinase (PI3K) inhibitors such as copanlisib, idelalisib, or duvelisib may be used to treat relapsed indolent lymphoma. Clinical trials are also an option.

=== Treatment by subtype ===
==== Follicular lymphoma ====
Some patients do not need treatment for several years, while others whose cancer has spread widely need it immediately. In some cases, the disease can transform into an aggressive type of lymphoma such as diffuse large B-cell lymphoma (DLBCL).

Patients who have Stage I or II follicular lymphoma may be treated with radiation therapy alone or with chemotherapy. For patients who are in Stage II but have bulky disease, are in Stage III or IV, or have relapsed or refractory disease, treatment depends on the patient's age, overall health, disease progression, symptoms, and personal preferences. Treatment options include watchful waiting, radiation aimed directly at the affected lymph nodes, chemotherapy, and immunotherapy. For patients whose disease becomes more aggressive, autologous stem cell transplantation may be used.

There is no consensus on the optimal first-line treatment for follicular lymphoma. Some studies have found no difference in life expectancy or quality of life between asymptomatic patients who receive treatment and those who are closely monitored without treatment. Other doctors believe that potentially curative radiation therapy is underused, and that this may lead to excessive treatments and costs in the long term.

==== Marginal zone lymphoma ====
Gastric MZL is often related to Helicobacter pylori infection. Many patients can be cured with antibiotics alone. If remission is not achieved, radiation therapy may be used. For nodal MZL that involves the spleen and blood, treatment is similar to that of follicular lymphoma.

== Prognosis ==
Although indolent lymphoma tends to progress slowly and median overall survival is more than 10 years, prognoses differs substantially both within and between subtypes. Some patients live many years longer than the median survival, while others die a short time after diagnosis.

Patients with HIV infection tend to have similar median survival as patients who are HIV negative. Younger patients have higher five-year survival rates than older patients. A study in the Netherlands shows that in the younger age group, mortality caused by follicular lymphoma and marginal zone lymphoma after 15 years is minimal, suggesting the likelihood of a cure.
