= Indolent =

Indolent may refer to:

- Laziness
- Indolent Records, a defunct music label formerly owned by Bertelsmann Music Group
- indolent condition, a slowly progressive medical condition associated with little or no pain
- The lowest of three grades of non-Hodgkin's lymphoma (NHL)
- Indolent ulcers or Boxer ulcers, refractory corneal ulcers
- Indolent carditis, a form of infective endocarditis that may also indicate rheumatic fever

== See also ==
- Indolence (disambiguation)
