= Leniolisib =

Medication

Clinical data
- Trade names: Joenja
- Other names: CDZ173
- AHFS/Drugs.com: Monograph
- MedlinePlus: a623016
- License data: US DailyMed: Leniolisib
- Routes of administration: By mouth
- Drug class: Antineoplastic
- ATC code: L03AX22 (WHO)

Legal status
- Legal status: AU: S4 (Prescription only); CA: ℞-only; UK: POM (Prescription only); US: ℞-only; EU: Rx-only

Identifiers
- CAS Number: 1354690-24-6; as salt: 1354691-97-6
- DrugBank: DB16217
- ChemSpider: 52083264
- UNII: L22772Z9CP
- KEGG: D11158; as salt: D11159
- ChEMBL: ChEMBL3643413
- PDB ligand: 9NQ (PDBe, RCSB PDB)

Chemical and physical data
- Formula: C_{21}H_{25}F_{3}N_{6}O_{2}
- Molar mass: 450.466 g·mol^{−1}
- 3D model (JSmol): Interactive image
- SMILES: CCC(=O)N1CC[C@@H](C1)NC1=C2CN(CCC2=NC=N1)C1=CN=C(OC)C(=C1)C(F)(F)F
- InChI: InChI=1S/C21H25F3N6O2/c1-3-18(31)30-6-4-13(10-30)28-19-15-11-29(7-5-17(15)26-12-27-19)14-8-16(21(22,23)24)20(32-2)25-9-14/h8-9,12-13H,3-7,10-11H2,1-2H3,(H,26,27,28)/t13-/m0/s1; Key:MWKYMZXCGYXLPL-ZDUSSCGKSA-N

Leniolisib, sold under the brand name Joenja, is an anti-cancer medication used for the treatment of activated phosphoinositide 3-kinase delta syndrome (APDS). It is a kinase inhibitor that is taken by mouth.

The most common side effects include headache, sinusitis, and atopic dermatitis.

Leniolisib was approved for medical use in the United States in March 2023, in the United Kingdom in September 2024, and in the European Union in May 2026. It is the first approved medication for the treatment of activated PI3K delta syndrome. The US Food and Drug Administration considers it to be a first-in-class medication. In 2025 NICE approved it for use in the British NHS.

== Medical uses ==
Leniolisib is indicated for the treatment of activated phosphoinositide 3-kinase delta syndrome (activated PI3K delta syndrome) in people twelve years of age and older.

Activated PI3K delta syndrome is caused by mutations in either of two genes, PIK3CD or PIK3R1, that regulate the maturation of white blood cells, especially B cells and T cells. This leads to a decrease in immune cells, which makes it difficult for people with activated PI3K delta syndrome to fight off bacterial and viral infections.

== Mechanism of action ==
Leniolisib is a selective phosphoinositide 3-kinase inhibitor (PI3Kδ inhibitor), which means it blocks a form of the protein called phosphoinositide 3-kinase delta (PI3Kδ) that is overactive in activated PI3K delta syndrome. By inhibiting PI3Kδ, leniolisib helps normalize immune function as measured by a significant increase in number of immune response generating B cells and reduction in size of lymph nodes.

== Adverse effects ==
The most common encountered adverse effects were headache, sinusitis, and atopic dermatitis.

== History ==
Leniolisib was developed by Novartis and subsequently licensed to Pharming Group, a Dutch biotechnology company, in 2019.

The US Food and Drug Administration (FDA) evaluated the efficacy of leniolisib in the placebo-controlled portion of Study 2201 (NCT02435173), a twelve‑week blinded, randomized, placebo-controlled study of 31 participants twelve years of age and older with confirmed APDS-associated genetic PI3Kδ mutation, with a documented variant in either PIK3CD or PIK3R1.

The FDA granted the application for leniolisib orphan drug, priority review, and rare pediatric disease designations.

== Society and culture ==
=== Legal status ===
Leniolisib was approved for medical use in the United States in March 2023. in the United Kingdom in September 2024, and in the European Union in May 2026.

=== Names ===
Leniolisib is the international nonproprietary name.

Leniolisib is sold under the brand name Joenja.
