= Taselisib =

Chemical compound

Clinical data
- ATC code: None

Identifiers
- IUPAC name: 2-{4-[2-(1-Isopropyl-3-methyl-1H-1,2,4-triazol-5-yl)-5,6-dihydroimidazo[1,2-d][1,4]benzoxazepin-9-yl]-1H-pyrazol-1-yl}-2-methylpropanamide
- CAS Number: 1282512-48-4
- PubChem CID: 51001932
- ChemSpider: 29315044
- UNII: L08J2O299M
- KEGG: D11774
- ChEMBL: ChEMBL2387080
- CompTox Dashboard (EPA): DTXSID00155842

Chemical and physical data
- Formula: C_{24}H_{28}N_{8}O_{2}
- Molar mass: 460.542 g·mol^{−1}
- 3D model (JSmol): Interactive image
- SMILES: CC1=NN(C(=N1)C2=CN3CCOC4=C(C3=N2)C=CC(=C4)C5=CN(N=C5)C(C)(C)C(=O)N)C(C)C
- InChI: InChI=1S/C24H28N8O2/c1-14(2)32-22(27-15(3)29-32)19-13-30-8-9-34-20-10-16(6-7-18(20)21(30)28-19)17-11-26-31(12-17)24(4,5)23(25)33/h6-7,10-14H,8-9H2,1-5H3,(H2,25,33); Key:BEUQXVWXFDOSAQ-UHFFFAOYSA-N

Taselisib (development code: GDC-0032) is a former cancer drug candidate that was in development by Roche. It is a small molecule phosphoinositide 3-kinase inhibitor targeting the PI3K isoform p110α (PIK3CA).

Roche announced in June 2018 that there would be no further development of taselislib following the top line results of the Phase III "Sandpiper" study. Currently running clinical trials were continued for patients exhibiting benefit.
