= Gedatolisib =

Chemical compound

Clinical data
- Trade names: Revtorpyk
- Other names: PF-05212384; PKI-587
- AHFS/Drugs.com: revtorpyk
- License data: US DailyMed: Gedatolisib
- Routes of administration: Intravenous infusion
- Drug class: Antineoplastic
- ATC code: None

Legal status
- Legal status: US: ℞-only

Identifiers
- IUPAC name: 1-[4-[4-(Dimethylamino)piperidine-1-carbonyl]phenyl]-3-[4-(4,6-dimorpholin-4-yl-1,3,5-triazin-2-yl)phenyl]urea
- CAS Number: 1197160-78-3
- PubChem CID: 44516953
- IUPHAR/BPS: 7940
- DrugBank: DB11896
- ChemSpider: 24644946
- UNII: 96265TNH2R
- KEGG: D10635
- ChEMBL: ChEMBL592445
- CompTox Dashboard (EPA): DTXSID40152557

Chemical and physical data
- Formula: C_{32}H_{41}N_{9}O_{4}
- Molar mass: 615.739 g·mol^{−1}
- 3D model (JSmol): Interactive image
- SMILES: CN(C)C1CCN(CC1)C(=O)C2=CC=C(C=C2)NC(=O)NC3=CC=C(C=C3)C4=NC(=NC(=N4)N5CCOCC5)N6CCOCC6
- InChI: InChI=1S/C32H41N9O4/c1-38(2)27-11-13-39(14-12-27)29(42)24-5-9-26(10-6-24)34-32(43)33-25-7-3-23(4-8-25)28-35-30(40-15-19-44-20-16-40)37-31(36-28)41-17-21-45-22-18-41/h3-10,27H,11-22H2,1-2H3,(H2,33,34,43); Key:DWZAEMINVBZMHQ-UHFFFAOYSA-N

Gedatolisib, sold under the brand name Revtorpyk, is an anti-cancer medication used for the treatment of breast cancer. Gedatolisib is a kinase inhibitor. The mechanism of action is accomplished by binding the different p110 catalytic subunit isoforms of PI3K and the kinase site of mTOR. Gedatolisib is administered by intravenous infusion. It was developed by Celcuity, Inc.

Gedatolisib was approved for medical use in the United States in July 2026.

== Medical uses ==
Gedatolisib is indicated in combination with fulvestrant, with or without palbociclib, for the treatment of adults with hormone receptor (HR)-positive, human epidermal growth factor receptor 2 (HER2)-negative locally advanced or metastatic breast cancer without a PIK3CA mutation detected following progression on or after treatment with at least one line of endocrine therapy in the metastatic setting.

== Adverse effects ==
The US prescription label includes warnings and precautions for stomatitis, dermatologic adverse reactions, hyperglycemia, and embryo-fetal toxicity.

== Mechanism of action ==
Gedatolisib acts as a dual mTOR/PI3K inhibitor.

=== mTOR inhibition ===
mTOR is a downstream effector of PI3K and is also independently regulated by hormones, growth factors, and nutrients. mTOR protein is found in two functionally distinct protein assemblies: mTOR complex 1 (mTORC1) and mTOR complex 2 (mTORC2). mTOR signaling serves as a central regulator of cell metabolism, growth, proliferation, and survival. In cancer, dysfunctional mTOR signaling leads to various constitutive activities of both mTOR-involved complexes, making mTOR an important therapeutic target for cancer therapy. Gedatolisib also binds to mTOR to inhibit its activity.

=== PI3K inhibition ===
Activation of the PI3K/mTOR pathway has been implicated in a wide variety of human cancers including carcinomas of the breast, prostate, lung, endometrial, colon, and ovary, among others. Each of the four catalytic isoforms of class I PI3K preferentially mediate signal transduction and tumor cell survival based on the type of malignancy and the genetic or epigenetic alterations an individual patient harbors. Activities associated with PI3K involve the regulation of diverse cellular processes, including cell proliferation, survival, cytoskeletal organization, and glucose transport and utilization. Over activation of the PI3K pathway is frequently present in human malignancies and plays a key role in cancer progression. Due to the multiple sub-cellular locations, activities, and importance of the different PI3K isoforms and complexes in regulating cancer cell proliferation, complete control of the PI3K pathway activity is an important target for efficacious cancer therapy. Gedatolisib binds to all PI3K catalytic subunit isoforms involved in oncogenic signaling approximately equally.

== History ==
Efficacy was evaluated in study 1 of VIKTORIA-1 (NCT05501886), an open-label, randomized, multi-center trial that enrolled 392 adults with locally advanced (inoperable) or metastatic hormone receptor-positive, human epidermal growth factor receptor 2-negative breast cancer. Participants were randomized (1:1:1) to receive either gedatolisib in combination with fulvestrant and palbociclib (arm A), gedatolisib in combination with fulvestrant (arm B), or fulvestrant alone (arm C). Participants received treatment until disease progression or unacceptable toxicity.

=== Clinical trials ===
A number of early phase clinical trials of gedatolisib for treatment of endometrial cancer, colorectal cancer, acute myeloid leukemia have been conducted.

Clinical trials are focused on breast cancer.

== Society and culture ==
=== Legal status ===
Gedatolisib was approved for medical use in the United States in July 2026.

=== Names ===
Gedatolisib is the international nonproprietary name.

Gedatolisib is sold under the brand name Revtorpyk.
