= Eganelisib =

Chemical compound

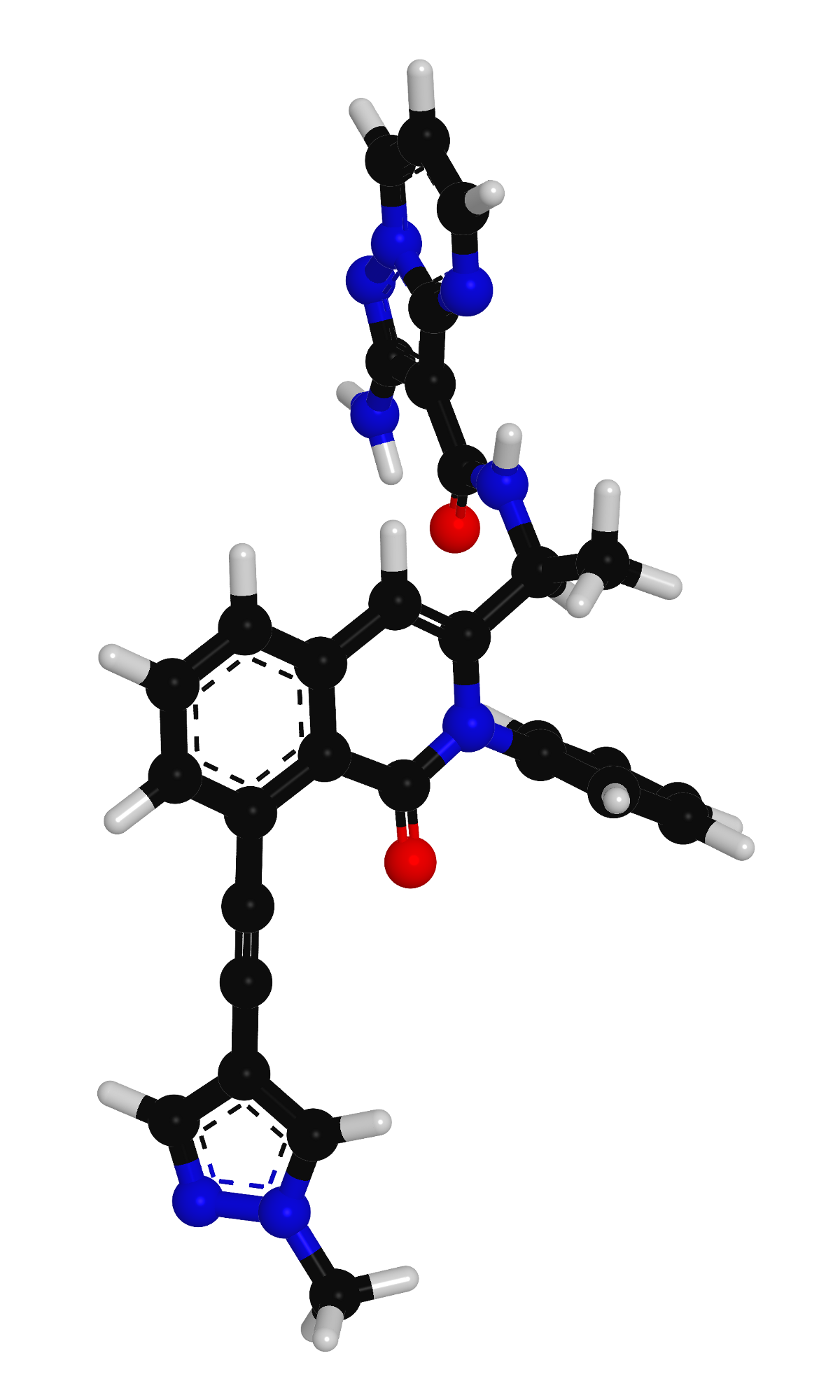

Clinical data
- Routes of administration: Oral
- ATC code: None

Identifiers
- IUPAC name: 2-amino-N-[(1S)-1-{8-[(1-methyl-1H-pyrazol-4-yl)ethynyl]-1-oxo-2-phenyl-1,2-dihydroisoquinolin-3-yl}ethyl]pyrazolo[1,5-a]pyrimidine-3-carboxamide
- CAS Number: 1693758-51-8
- PubChem CID: 91933883
- ChemSpider: 60600433
- UNII: FOF5155FMZ
- KEGG: D11896
- ChEMBL: ChEMBL3984425
- PDB ligand: V7Y (PDBe, RCSB PDB)
- CompTox Dashboard (EPA): DTXSID301336580

Chemical and physical data
- Formula: C_{30}H_{24}N_{8}O_{2}
- Molar mass: 528.576 g·mol^{−1}
- 3D model (JSmol): Interactive image
- SMILES: Cn1cc(cn1)C#Cc6cccc2c6C(=O)N(C(=C2)C(C)NC(=O)c4c3ncccn3nc4N)c5ccccc5
- InChI: InChI=1S/C30H24N8O2/c1-19(34-29(39)26-27(31)35-37-15-7-14-32-28(26)37)24-16-22-9-6-8-21(13-12-20-17-33-36(2)18-20)25(22)30(40)38(24)23-10-4-3-5-11-23/h3-11,14-19H,1-2H3,(H2,31,35)(H,34,39)/t19-/m0/s1; Key:XUMALORDVCFWKV-IBGZPJMESA-N

Eganelisib (USAN), codenamed IPI-549, is an experimental drug being investigated as a possible treatment for cancer. It is a highly selective phosphoinositide 3-kinase inhibitor, and thus works by inhibiting the enzyme PIK3CG, disrupting the PI3K/AKT/mTOR signaling pathway which plays important roles in the development of cancer.

Eganelisib is being developed by Infinity Pharmaceuticals. Early clinical trial results were published in September 2016. On September 29, 2020, it was granted Fast Track designation by the United States Food and Drug Administration (FDA) as a treatment for inoperable, locally advanced, or metastatic triple-negative breast cancer, combined with a checkpoint inhibitor and chemotherapy.

As of October 2020, five phase I/II clinical trials were ongoing in the United States, and one in Europe.

Eganelisib has also been explored for its potential use in the treatment of COVID-19 and MRSA. Early, pre-clinical in vitro studies published in 2024 suggested eganelisib's ability to inhibit PI3Kγ, an enzyme involved in myeloid cell movement into infected tissues, could reduce excessive immune system activity that can damage tissues. By inhibiting PI3Kγ, eganelisib may prevent myeloid cells from entering and damaging tissue in patients with COVID-19 or MRSA, thereby reducing inflammation and the risk of cytokine storms. The study also indicated eganelisib may inhibit the main protease (M^{pro}) protein of the SARS-CoV-2 virus, a crucial enzyme required for viral replication, potentially offering another therapeutic avenue against COVID-19.
