= Buparlisib =

Chemical compound

Clinical data
- Other names: AN2025, BKM120
- ATC code: None

Identifiers
- IUPAC name: 5-[2,6-bis(morpholin-4-yl)pyrimidin-4-yl]-4-(trifluoromethyl)pyridin-2-amine
- CAS Number: 944396-07-0
- PubChem CID: 16654980
- DrugBank: DB11666
- ChemSpider: 17588300
- UNII: 0ZM2Z182GD
- KEGG: D10584
- CompTox Dashboard (EPA): DTXSID50241486
- ECHA InfoCard: 100.232.248

Chemical and physical data
- Formula: C_{18}H_{21}F_{3}N_{6}O_{2}
- Molar mass: 410.401 g·mol^{−1}
- 3D model (JSmol): Interactive image
- SMILES: NC1=NC=C(C2=CC(=NC(=N2)N2CCOCC2)N2CCOCC2)C(=C1)C(F)(F)F
- InChI: InChI=1S/C18H21F3N6O2/c19-18(20,21)13-9-15(22)23-11-12(13)14-10-16(26-1-5-28-6-2-26)25-17(24-14)27-3-7-29-8-4-27/h9-11H,1-8H2,(H2,22,23); Key:CWHUFRVAEUJCEF-UHFFFAOYSA-N

Buparlisib (codenamed AN2025 and BKM120) is an experimental anti-cancer medication. It is a small molecule orally-available pan-class I phosphoinositide 3-kinase (PI3K) inhibitor. Buparlisib was under investigation as a treatment for advanced breast cancer but was abandoned due to negative results. It is still under investigation as a potential treatment for head and neck squamous cell carcinoma (HNSCC).

== Clinical trials ==
Buparlisib was under investigation as a treatment for advanced or metastatic HER2-negative breast cancer in several phase III clinical trials:

- The phase III trial BELLE-2 compared buparlisib + fulvestrant with fulvestrant alone in patients with advanced or metastatic HER2-negative, hormone receptor-positive (HR+) aromatase inhibitor-resistant breast cancer. Treatment with buparlisib prolonged progression-free survival (PFS) significantly but also resulted in excessive side effects.
- Similar to BELLE-2, the phase III trial BELLE-3 compared buparlisib + fulvestrant with fulvestrant alone in patients with advanced or metastatic HER2-negative breast cancer, however in this trial, the disease had to be resistant to a mammalian target of rapamycin (mTOR) inhibitor. The trial was terminated due to excessive side effects.
- The phase II/III trial BELLE-4 compared buparlisib + paclitaxel with paclitaxel alone in patients with advanced or metastatic HER2-negative breast cancer regardless of hormone receptor status. Addition of buparlisib to paclitaxel did not improve PFS, and the trial was stopped for futility at the end of phase II.

These results led the trials' sponsor, Novartis, to cancel their breast cancer study program with buparlisib.

Buparlisib is still under investigation as a potential treatment for head and neck squamous cell carcinoma (HNSCC) in the ongoing phase III trial BURAN, which compares buparlisib + paclitaxel to paclitaxel alone in patients with recurrent or metastatic HNSCC. Results are expected for December 2022.
