= DGKZ =

Protein-coding gene in the species Homo sapiens

Identifiers
- Aliases: DGKZ, DAGK5, DAGK6, DGK-ZETA, hDGKzeta, diacylglycerol kinase zeta
- External IDs: OMIM: 601441; MGI: 1278339; GeneCards: DGKZ
Enzyme activity
EC #	BRENDA	ExPASy	KEGG	MetaCyc
2.7.1.93	↗	↗	↗	↗
2.7.1.107	↗	↗	↗	↗

Gene location (Human)
Chr.	Chromosome 11 (human)
Band	11p11.2	Start	46,332,905 bp
Band	11p11.2	End	46,380,554 bp

Gene location (Mouse)
Chr.	Chromosome 2 (mouse)
Band	2|2 E1	Start	91,763,169 bp
Band	2|2 E1	End	91,806,209 bp
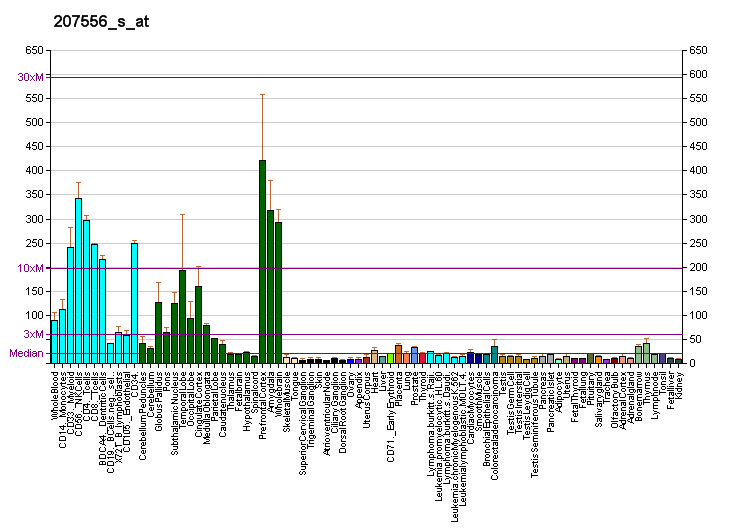
RNA expression pattern
Bgee	Human / Mouse (ortholog); Top expressed in: right frontal lobe; cingulate gyrus; anterior cingulate cortex; granulocyte; Brodmann area 9; apex of heart; gastrocnemius muscle; right hemisphere of cerebellum; muscle of thigh; anterior pituitary / Top expressed in: lobe of cerebellum; cerebellar vermis; primary motor cortex; internal carotid artery; cingulate gyrus; prefrontal cortex; Paneth cell; subdivision of hippocampus; Region I of hippocampus proper; temporal lobe; More reference expression data
BioGPS	More reference expression data
Gene ontology
Molecular function	transferase activity; nucleotide binding; lipid kinase activity; metal ion binding; protein C-terminus binding; protein binding; ATP binding; kinase activity; diacylglycerol kinase activity; NAD+ kinase activity
Cellular component	membrane; plasma membrane; nucleus; lamellipodium; cytoplasm; nuclear speck; postsynaptic density; glutamatergic synapse; cell projection
Biological process	intracellular signal transduction; platelet activation; protein kinase C-activating G protein-coupled receptor signaling pathway; mitotic G1 DNA damage checkpoint signaling; cell migration; negative regulation of mitotic cell cycle; glycerolipid metabolic process; phosphorylation; diacylglycerol metabolic process; lipid phosphorylation; metabolism; signal transduction; phosphatidic acid biosynthetic process; positive regulation of 1-phosphatidylinositol-4-phosphate 5-kinase activity
Sources:Amigo / QuickGO
Orthologs
Databases	NCBI: entry; OMA: entry
Species	Human	Mouse
Entrez	8525	104418
Ensembl	ENSG00000149091	ENSMUSG00000040479
UniProt	Q13574	Q80UP3
RefSeq (mRNA)	NM_001105540; NM_001199266; NM_001199267; NM_001199268; NM_003646 NM_201532; NM_201533	NM_001166597; NM_138306
RefSeq (protein)	NP_001099010; NP_001186195; NP_001186196; NP_001186197; NP_003637 NP_963290; NP_963291	NP_001160069; NP_612179
Location (UCSC)	Chr 11: 46.33 – 46.38 Mb	Chr 2: 91.76 – 91.81 Mb
PubMed search
- Wikidata
View/Edit Human	View/Edit Mouse

Diacylglycerol kinase zeta is an enzyme that in humans is encoded by the DGKZ gene.

The protein encoded by this gene belongs to the eukaryotic diacylglycerol kinase family. It may attenuate protein kinase C activity by regulating diacylglycerol levels in intracellular signaling cascade and signal transduction. Alternative splicing occurs at this locus and three transcript variants encoding three distinct isoforms have been identified.

== Interactions ==
DGKZ has been shown to interact with P110α.
