= Zandelisib =

Chemical compound

Legal status
- Legal status: Investigational

Identifiers
- IUPAC name: 4-[2-(difluoromethyl)benzimidazol-1-yl]-N-[2-methyl-1-[2-(1-methylpiperidin-4-yl)phenyl]propan-2-yl]-6-morpholin-4-yl-1,3,5-triazin-2-amine
- CAS Number: 1401436-95-0
- PubChem CID: 66571003
- DrugBank: DB18245
- ChemSpider: 57617733
- UNII: 8Z28M5SX0X
- KEGG: D12009
- ChEMBL: ChEMBL4650214

Chemical and physical data
- Formula: C_{31}H_{38}F_{2}N_{8}O
- Molar mass: 576.697 g·mol^{−1}
- 3D model (JSmol): Interactive image
- SMILES: CC(C)(CC1=CC=CC=C1C2CCN(CC2)C)NC3=NC(=NC(=N3)N4CCOCC4)N5C6=CC=CC=C6N=C5C(F)F
- InChI: InChI=1S/C31H38F2N8O/c1-31(2,20-22-8-4-5-9-23(22)21-12-14-39(3)15-13-21)38-28-35-29(40-16-18-42-19-17-40)37-30(36-28)41-25-11-7-6-10-24(25)34-27(41)26(32)33/h4-11,21,26H,12-20H2,1-3H3,(H,35,36,37,38); Key:WPFUFWIHMYZXSF-UHFFFAOYSA-N

Zandelisib is an investigational new drug that is being evaluated to treat follicular lymphoma. It is a phosphatidylinositol 3 kinase delta inhibitor.
