= Indolent condition =

Long-term medical condition

Indolent condition is a condition that continues for a prolonged period.

Examples include:

- Indolent chronic lymphocytic leukemia or indolent CLL, which is a slow-progressing blood and bone marrow cancer,
- Indolent lymphoma or low-grade lymphoma, a type of slow-growing non-Hodgkin lymphoma or slow-growing NHL.
