= Indolence =

Indolence means lack of activity and may refer to:

- Laziness of people and living beings
- A sign of benignity in histopathology of tumors

== See also ==
- Indolent (disambiguation)
