= Parsaclisib =

Investigational medication

Clinical data
- ATC code: L01EM05 (WHO)

Identifiers
- IUPAC name: 4R)-4-[3-[(1S)-1-(4-amino-3-methylpyrazolo[3,4-d]pyrimidin-1-yl)ethyl]-5-chloro-2-ethoxy-6-fluorophenyl]pyrrolidin-2-one
- CAS Number: 1426698-88-5
- PubChem CID: 86677874
- DrugBank: DB14867
- ChemSpider: 64835232
- UNII: OS7097575K
- KEGG: D11437
- ChEMBL: ChEMBL4297615

Chemical and physical data
- Formula: C_{20}H_{22}ClFN_{6}O_{2}
- Molar mass: 432.88 g·mol^{−1}
- 3D model (JSmol): Interactive image
- SMILES: CCOC1=C(C(=C(C=C1[C@H](C)N2C3=NC=NC(=C3C(=N2)C)N)Cl)F)[C@H]4CC(=O)NC4
- InChI: InChI=InChI=1S/C20H22ClFN6O2/c1-4-30-18-12(6-13(21)17(22)16(18)11-5-14(29)24-7-11)10(3)28-20-15(9(2)27-28)19(23)25-8-26-20/h6,8,10-11H,4-5,7H2,1-3H3,(H,24,29)(H2,23,25,26)/t10-,11-/m0/s1; Key:ZQPDJCIXJHUERQ-QWRGUYRKSA-N

Parsaclisib is an investigational drug that it being evaluated for the treatment of B-cell malignancies. It is a PI3Kδ (phosphoinositide 3-kinase) inhibitor.
