= Inavolisib =

Chemical compound

Clinical data
- Trade names: Itovebi
- Other names: GDC-0077, RG6114, Ro7113755
- AHFS/Drugs.com: Monograph
- MedlinePlus: a624068
- License data: US DailyMed: Inavolisib
- Routes of administration: By mouth
- Drug class: PI3K inhibitor
- ATC code: L01EM06 (WHO)

Legal status
- Legal status: AU: S4 (Prescription only); CA: ℞-only; US: ℞-only; EU: Rx-only

Identifiers
- IUPAC name: (2S)-2-[[2-[(4S)-4-(difluoromethyl)-2-oxo-1,3-oxazolidin-3-yl]-5,6-dihydroimidazo[1,2-d][1,4]benzoxazepin-9-yl]amino]propanamide
- CAS Number: 2060571-02-8
- PubChem CID: 124173720
- IUPHAR/BPS: 9636
- DrugBank: DB15275
- ChemSpider: 59718498
- UNII: L4C1UY2NYH
- KEGG: D11942
- ChEMBL: ChEMBL4650215
- PDB ligand: X3N (PDBe, RCSB PDB)

Chemical and physical data
- Formula: C_{18}H_{19}F_{2}N_{5}O_{4}
- Molar mass: 407.378 g·mol^{−1}
- 3D model (JSmol): Interactive image
- SMILES: C[C@@H](C(=O)N)NC1=CC2=C(C=C1)C3=NC(=CN3CCO2)N4[C@@H](COC4=O)C(F)F
- InChI: InChI=1S/C18H19F2N5O4/c1-9(16(21)26)22-10-2-3-11-13(6-10)28-5-4-24-7-14(23-17(11)24)25-12(15(19)20)8-29-18(25)27/h2-3,6-7,9,12,15,22H,4-5,8H2,1H3,(H2,21,26)/t9-,12-/m0/s1; Key:SGEUNORSOZVTOL-CABZTGNLSA-N

Inavolisib, sold under the brand name Itovebi by Genentech, a member of the Roche group, is an anti-cancer medication used for the treatment of breast cancer. It is an inhibitor and degrader of mutated phosphatidylinositol 3-kinase (PI3K) alpha (PIK3CA).

The most common adverse reactions include gastrointestinal disorders, high blood glucose, and infections.

Inavolisib was approved for medical use in the United States in October 2024.

== Medical uses ==
Inavolisib is indicated in combination with palbociclib and fulvestrant for the treatment of adults with endocrine-resistant, PIK3CA-mutated, hormone receptor (HR)-positive, human epidermal growth factor receptor 2 (HER2)-negative, locally advanced or metastatic breast cancer, as detected by an FDA-approved test, following recurrence on or after completing adjuvant endocrine therapy.

== Side effects ==
The most common adverse reactions include gastrointestinal disorders (stomatitis, diarrhea, nausea, and vomiting), skin and subcutaneous tissue disorders (rash, dry skin, and alopecia), infections, and laboratory abnormalities, the most notable of which is increased fasting blood glucose. 6% of those treated with inavolisib in the INAVO120 trial had to discontinue treatment due to adverse effects.

== Synthesis ==
Inavolisib can be developed as a derivative of 1,3-oxazole or by stereo-controlled N-arylation of alpha-amino acids.

== Metabolism and biotransformation ==
Inavolisib has an oral bioavailability of 76%, which is not significantly affected by diet. After absorption, inavolisib is extensively distributed (155 L) and is primarily metabolized through hydrolysis. 49% of a single dose of inavolisib is excreted in urine, 48% in feces, and only a minority of the dose is excreted unchanged.

== Molecular mechanisms of action ==
Inavolisib is a PI3Kα inhibitor with a high degree of selectivity over beta-, gamma-, and delta-isoforms of PI3K. When binding to the catalytic portion of PI3K alpha, p110α, inavolisib's carbonyl group forms a hydrogen bond with Tyr836 (conserved) in p110α. The difluoromethyl group can interact with the hydroxyl group presented on Ser774 (conserved) in p110α, which is 3.2Å nearer than that of the equivalent residue Ser754 in p110δ. Additionally, the amide group can interact with Gln859 (non-conserved). This results in a very high selectivity regarding PI3Kα isoforms. Inhibition of PI3Kα reduces the proliferation and increases apoptosis of cancer cell lines that are dependent on PI3Kα activity.

In addition to its kinase inhibitory ability, clinically relevant concentrations of inavolisib have been shown to specifically degrade the mutated forms of p110α in a manner that is dependent on receptor tyrosine kinase activity. Such ability prevents the activation of downstream signalling pathways, even with rebound upstream RTK activity. The exact mechanism behind this mutant-specific degradation activity has not been fully elucidated.

== History ==
Efficacy was evaluated in INAVO120 (NCT04191499), a randomized, double-blind, placebo-controlled, multicenter trial in 325 participants with endocrine-resistant, PIK3CA-mutated HR-positive, HER2-negative locally advanced or metastatic breast cancer whose disease progressed during or within twelve months of completing adjuvant endocrine therapy and who had not received prior systemic therapy for locally advanced or metastatic disease. Primary endocrine resistance was defined as relapse during the first two years of adjuvant endocrine therapy. Secondary endocrine resistance was defined as relapse while on adjuvant endocrine therapy after at least two years or relapse within twelve months of completing adjuvant endocrine therapy.

The results show that inavolisib doubles progression-free survival, from 7.3 months in the placebo group to 15.0 months. Inavolisib was also shown to extend overall survival by 7 months (27.0 months in the placebo group vs 34.0 months in the inavolisib group).

== Society and culture ==
=== Legal status ===
In October 2024, the US Food and Drug Administration (FDA) approved inavolisib for the treatment of PIK3CA-mutated breast cancer based on the results from the INAVO120 trial. The FDA granted the application for inavolisib priority review and breakthrough therapy designations.

In May 2025, the Committee for Medicinal Products for Human Use of the European Medicines Agency adopted a positive opinion, recommending the granting of a marketing authorization for the medicinal product Itovebi, intended for the treatment of adults with PIK3CA-mutated, estrogen receptor (ER)-positive, HER2-negative locally advanced and metastatic breast cancer. The applicant for this medicinal product is Roche Registration GmbH. Inavolisib was authorized for medical use in the EU in June 2025.

=== Names ===
Inavolisib is the international nonproprietary name.

Inavolisib is sold under the brand name Itovebi.

== Research ==
Inavolisib is being studied in multiple settings and in combination with other molecules, including the treatment of advanced/metastatic breast cancer, one of which is a head-to-head trial against alpelisib, and the treatment of solid tumors other than breast cancer.
