= Tersolisib =

Investigational drug

== Tersolisib ==
Tersolisib

Clinical data
- Other names: LY4064809

Identifiers
- IUPAC name: 1-(2-aminopyrimidin-5-yl)-3-[(1R)-1-(5,7-difluoro-3-methyl-1-benzofuran-2-yl)-2,2,2-trifluoroethyl]urea
- CAS Number: 2883540-92-7
- PubChem CID: 166532451
- IUPHAR/BPS: 12903
- DrugBank: DB21752
- ChemSpider: 128942469
- UNII: AGX9NKC8M9
- KEGG: D13290
- ChEMBL: ChEMBL5421037
- PDB ligand: ZWE (PDBe, RCSB PDB)

Chemical and physical data
- Formula: C_{16}H_{12}F_{5}N_{5}O_{2}
- Molar mass: 401.297 g·mol^{−1}
- 3D model (JSmol): Interactive image
- SMILES: CC1=C(OC2=C1C=C(C=C2F)F)[C@H](C(F)(F)F)NC(=O)NC3=CN=C(N=C3)N
- InChI: InChI=InChI=1S/C16H12F5N5O2/c1-6-9-2-7(17)3-10(18)12(9)28-11(6)13(16(19,20)21)26-15(27)25-8-4-23-14(22)24-5-8/h2-5,13H,1H3,(H2,22,23,24)(H2,25,26,27)/t13-/m1/s1; Key:LGPNQALKGDDVBD-CYBMUJFWSA-N

Tersolisib is an investigational new drug that is being evaluated by Eli Lilly and Company for the treatment of solid tumors. It is a PI3Kα inhibitor.
