= Umbralisib =

Chemical compound

Clinical data
- Trade names: Ukoniq
- Other names: RP5264; TGR-1202
- AHFS/Drugs.com: Ukoniq
- License data: US DailyMed: Umbralisib
- Pregnancy category: Not recommended
- Routes of administration: By mouth
- ATC code: L01EX25 (WHO)

Legal status
- Legal status: US: ℞-only / withdrawn

Pharmacokinetic data
- Metabolism: CYP2C9, CYP3A4, and CYP1A2
- Elimination half-life: 91 h
- Excretion: Feces, urine

Identifiers
- IUPAC name: 2-[(1S)-1-[4-Amino-3-(3-fluoro-4-propan-2-yloxyphenyl)pyrazolo[3,4-d]pyrimidin-1-yl]ethyl]-6-fluoro-3-(3-fluorophenyl)chromen-4-one
- CAS Number: 1532533-67-7
- PubChem CID: 72950888
- DrugBank: DB14989
- ChemSpider: 34979945
- UNII: 38073MQB2A
- KEGG: D11322
- ChEMBL: ChEMBL3948730
- CompTox Dashboard (EPA): DTXSID601337137

Chemical and physical data
- Formula: C_{31}H_{24}F_{3}N_{5}O_{3}
- Molar mass: 571.560 g·mol^{−1}
- 3D model (JSmol): Interactive image
- SMILES: CC(C)OC1=C(C=C(C=C1)C2=NN(C3=NC=NC(=C23)N)C(C)C4=C(C(=O)C5=C(O4)C=CC(=C5)F)C6=CC(=CC=C6)F)F
- InChI: InChI=1S/C31H24F3N5O3/c1-15(2)41-24-9-7-18(12-22(24)34)27-26-30(35)36-14-37-31(26)39(38-27)16(3)29-25(17-5-4-6-19(32)11-17)28(40)21-13-20(33)8-10-23(21)42-29/h4-16H,1-3H3,(H2,35,36,37)/t16-/m0/s1; Key:IUVCFHHAEHNCFT-INIZCTEOSA-N

Umbralisib, sold under the brand name Ukoniq, is an anti-cancer medication for the treatment of marginal zone lymphoma (MZL) and follicular lymphoma (FL). It is taken by mouth.

Umbralisib is a kinase inhibitor including PI3K-delta and casein kinase CK1-epsilon.

The most common side effects include increased creatinine, diarrhea-colitis, fatigue, nausea, neutropenia, transaminase elevation, musculoskeletal pain, anemia, thrombocytopenia, upper respiratory tract infection, vomiting, abdominal pain, decreased appetite, and rash.

Umbralisib was granted accelerated approval for medical use in the United States in February 2021. However, due to concerns for increased long term side effects leading to inferior overall survival which led to increased FDA scrutiny in the form of an ODAC review, it has been withdrawn from the US market.

== Medical uses ==
In April 2022, TG Therapeutics announced the voluntary withdrawal of Ukoniq (umbralisib) from sale for its approved use in the treatment of marginal zone lymphoma and follicular lymphoma. Furthermore, the company withdrew the pending Biologics License Application (BLA) and supplemental New Drug Application (sNDA) for the treatment of chronic lymphocytic leukemia (CLL) and small lymphocytic leukemia (SLL) which utilized umbralisib in tandem with ublituximab, known as the "U2" regimen. The decision was based on the overall survival (OS) data from the phase III trial, Unity-CLL, that illustrated and increasing imbalance in OS.

Umbralisib is indicated for adults with relapsed or refractory marginal zone lymphoma (MZL) who have received at least one prior anti-CD20-based regimen; and adults with relapsed or refractory follicular lymphoma (FL) who have received at least three prior lines of systemic therapy.

== Adverse effects ==
The prescribing information provides warnings and precautions for adverse reactions including infections, neutropenia, diarrhea and non-infectious colitis, hepatotoxicity, and severe cutaneous reactions.

== History ==
It has undergone clinical studies for chronic lymphocytic leukemia (CLL). Three year data (including follicular lymphoma and DLBCL) was announced June 2016. It is in combination trials for various leukemias and lymphomas, such as mantle cell lymphoma (MCL) and other lymphomas.

Umbralisib was granted breakthrough therapy designation by the U.S. Food and Drug Administration (FDA) for use in people with marginal zone lymphoma (MZL), a type of cancer with no specifically approved therapies.

FDA approval was based on two single-arm cohorts of an open-label, multi-center, multi-cohort trial, UTX-TGR-205 (NCT02793583), in 69 participants with marginal zone lymphoma (MZL) who received at least one prior therapy, including an anti-CD20 containing regimen, and in 117 participants with follicular lymphoma (FL) after at least two prior systemic therapies. The application for umbralisib was granted priority review for the marginal zone lymphoma (MZL) indication and orphan drug designation for the treatment of MZL and follicular lymphoma (FL).

== Society and culture ==
=== Legal status ===
In June 2022, due to safety concerns, the US Food and Drug Administration (FDA) withdrew its approval for Ukoniq (umbralisib).

Updated findings from the UNITY-CLL clinical trial show a possible increased risk of death in people receiving Ukoniq. As a result, the FDA determined the risks of treatment with Ukoniq outweigh its benefits. Based upon this determination, the drug's manufacturer, TG Therapeutics, announced it was voluntarily withdrawing Ukoniq from the market for the approved uses in MZL and FL.
