= Activated PI3K delta syndrome =

- Other names: immunodeficiency 14, p110δ-activating mutation causing senescent T cells, PASLI
- Activated PI3K Delta Syndrome is autosomal dominant
- Symptoms: Immunodeficiency, Lymphadenopathy
- Causes: Mutation in phosphatidylinositol 4,5-bisphosphate 3-kinase catalytic subunit delta isoform
- Diagnostic method: Genetic testing
- Treatment: Antiviral therapy

Activated PI3K delta syndrome (APDS) is a primary immunodeficiency disease caused by activating gain of function mutations in the PIK3CD gene.

== Symptoms and signs ==
The signs and symptoms of activated PI3K Delta Syndrome are consistent with the following:

- Immunodeficiency
- Lymphadenopathy
- Sinopulmonary infections
- Bronchiectasis

== Cause ==
In terms of genetics, activated PI3K Delta Syndrome is autosomal dominant, a mutation in phosphatidylinositol 4,5-bisphosphate 3-kinase catalytic subunit delta isoform is the reason for this condition (located at chromosome 1p36.)

== Mechanism ==
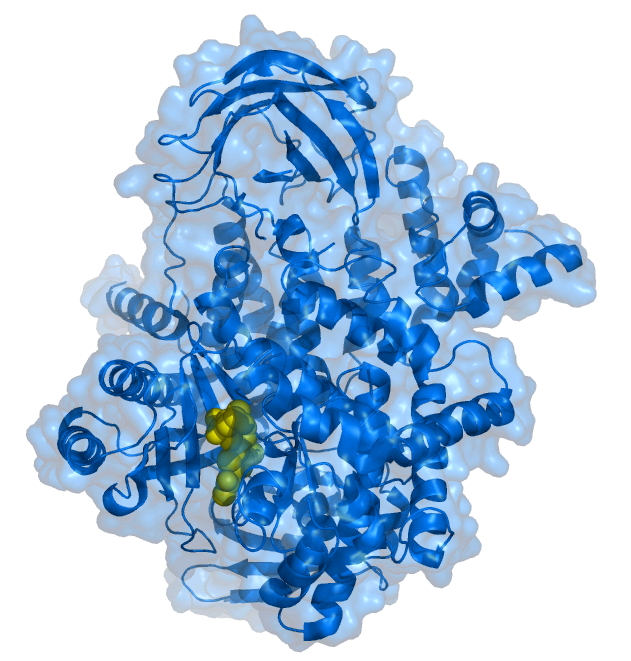
PI3kinase

The pathophysiology of activated PI3K delta syndrome has several aspects. The normal function has P110δ (PI3K) involved in immune system regulation.

P110δ effect is not limited to the immune system; P110δ has a presence in transformed epithelial cells and cell adhesion molecules (airway inflammation), and research has been done on the possibility of P110δ in the nervous system.

Activated PI3K delta syndrome effect indicates affected individuals are likely to have activation-induced cell death. Normally, PI3K-delta signaling assists B cells and T cells to mature; however, overactive PI3K-delta has an effect on the B and T cell differentiation (the process by which cells eventually are different from one another).

Consequently, there is an inability to confront an infection, as well as early cell death. Furthermore, overproduction of said signal can cause lymphadenopathy (which is an enlargement of lymph nodes) due to excess white blood cells.

== Diagnosis ==
In order to ascertain if an individual has activated PI3K delta syndrome, usually one finds atypical levels of immunoglobulins. Methods to determine the condition are the following:

- Genetic testing
- Laboratory findings
- Symptoms exhibited

== Treatment ==
Amoxicillin(antibiotic)

Infections for this condition, are treated or prevented in the following general ways:

- Bacterial infection should be treated rapidly (with antibiotics)
- Antiviral therapy
- Modify lifestyle (exposure to pathogens need to be minimized)

Leniolisib (Joenja) was approved for medical use in the United States in March 2023. It is the first approved drug in the US for activated PI3K delta syndrome. In June 2025 it was announced that a patient at Addenbrooke's Hospital in Cambridge, England, had become the first in Europe to be treated with leniolisib, and that NICE had approved it as cost-effective after the NHS had negotiated a price reduction.
