= Copanlisib =

Chemical compound

Clinical data
- Trade names: Aliqopa
- Other names: BAY 80-6946
- AHFS/Drugs.com: Monograph
- MedlinePlus: a617044
- License data: US DailyMed: Copanlisib; US FDA: 209936
- Routes of administration: Intravenous
- Drug class: PI3-Kinase inhibitor
- ATC code: L01EM02 (WHO)

Legal status
- Legal status: US: ℞-only

Pharmacokinetic data
- Protein binding: 84.2%
- Metabolism: CYP3A4/5 (≈90%), CYP1A1 (≈10%)
- Elimination half-life: 39.1 hours (range: 14.6 to 82.4)
- Excretion: Feces (64%), Urine (22%); 14% were not recovered

Identifiers
- IUPAC name: 2-Amino-N-[7-methoxy-8-(3-morpholin-4-ylpropoxy)-2,3-dihydroimidazo[1,2-c]quinazolin-5-yl]pyrimidine-5-carboxamide
- CAS Number: 1032568-63-0
- PubChem CID: 24989044
- DrugBank: DB12483
- ChemSpider: 25069683
- UNII: WI6V529FZ9
- KEGG: D10867
- ChEBI: CHEBI:173077
- ChEMBL: ChEMBL3218576
- CompTox Dashboard (EPA): DTXSID00145728

Chemical and physical data
- Formula: C_{23}H_{28}N_{8}O_{4}
- Molar mass: 480.529 g·mol^{−1}
- 3D model (JSmol): Interactive image
- SMILES: COC1=C(C=CC2=C1N=C(N3C2=NCC3)NC(=O)C4=CN=C(N=C4)N)OCCCN5CCOCC5
- InChI: InChI=1S/C23H28N8O4/c1-33-19-17(35-10-2-6-30-8-11-34-12-9-30)4-3-16-18(19)28-23(31-7-5-25-20(16)31)29-21(32)15-13-26-22(24)27-14-15/h3-4,13-14H,2,5-12H2,1H3,(H2,24,26,27)(H,28,29,32); Key:PZBCKZWLPGJMAO-UHFFFAOYSA-N

Copanlisib, sold under the brand name Aliqopa, is a medication used for the treatment of adults experiencing relapsed follicular lymphoma who have received at least two prior systemic therapies.

In November 2023, Bayer announced that it was withdrawing copanlisib from the United States market after the drug's phase III trial, CHRONOS-4, failed to establish confirmation of clinical benefits as sought by the Food and Drug Administration.

== Adverse effects ==
Data for safety and efficacy of copanlisib are described in the consumer-targeted FDA Drug Trial Snapshot. Copanlisib can cause serious side effects including infections, hyperglycemia, hypertension, pneumonitis, neutropenia and skin rashes. The most common side effects of copanlisib are hyperglycemia, diarrhea, decreased general strength and energy, hypertension, leukopenia, neutropenia, nausea, lower respiratory tract infections and thrombocytopenia.

== Mechanism of action ==
Copanlisib is an inhibitor of phosphatidylinositol-3-kinase (PI3K) with inhibitory activity predominantly against PI3K-α and PI3K-δ isoforms expressed in malignant B-cells. It has been shown to induce tumor cell death by apoptosis and inhibition of proliferation of primary malignant B cell lines.

== History ==
Efficacy resulting in the approval of copanlisib was based on the subgroup of 104 patients with follicular lymphoma from a phase II clinical trial.

To assess the safety of the drug, data from 168 adults with follicular lymphoma and other hematologic malignancies treated with copanlisib were evaluated.

=== Clinical trials ===
Phase II clinical trials are in progress for treatment of endometrial cancer, diffuse large B-cell lymphoma, cholangiocarcinoma, and non-Hodgkin lymphoma. Copanlisib in combination with R-CHOP or R-B (rituximab and bendamustine) is in a phase III trial for relapsed indolent non-Hodgkin lymphoma (NHL). Two separate phase III trials are investigating the use of copanlisib in combination with rituximab for indolent NHL and the other using copanlisib alone in cases of rituximab-refractory indolent NHL.

In a preclinical study, copanlisib was effective in inhibiting HER2+ breast cancer cells with acquired resistance to the HER2-inhibitors trastuzumab and/or lapatinib. This effect was increased when copanlisib was administered along with the aforementioned HER2-inhibitors. Consequently, treatments of copanlisib with trastuzumab are being clinically trialled in HER2-positive breast cancer patients.

== Society and culture ==
=== Legal status ===
For follicular lymphoma, the U.S. Food and Drug Administration (FDA) awarded copanlisib orphan drug designation in February 2015, and fast track designation in February 2016. The New drug application for follicular lymphoma was granted priority review in May 2017.

In September 2017, it received accelerated approval for the treatment of adults experiencing relapsed follicular lymphoma who have received at least two prior systemic therapies. Further clinical trials are to be performed as a post-marketing requirement to verify the clinical benefit.

Copanlisib was granted orphan drug status for the treatment of splenic, nodal and extranodal subtypes of marginal zone lymphoma.
