= P110δ =

Protein found in humans

PIK3CD

Identifiers
- Aliases: PIK3CD, APDS, IMD14, P110DELTA, PI3K, p110D, phosphatidylinositol-4,5-bisphosphate 3-kinase catalytic subunit delta, IMD14B, ROCHIS, IMD14A
- External IDs: OMIM: 602839; MGI: 1098211; GeneCards: PIK3CD
Available structures
PDB	Ortholog search: PDBe RCSB
PDB	List of PDB id codes 5DXU
Enzyme activity
EC #	BRENDA	ExPASy	KEGG	MetaCyc
2.7.1.137	↗	↗	↗	↗
2.7.1.153	↗	↗	↗	↗

Gene location (Human)
Chr.	Chromosome 1 (human)
Band	1p36.22	Start	9,651,731 bp
Band	1p36.22	End	9,729,114 bp

Gene location (Mouse)
Chr.	Chromosome 4 (mouse)
Band	4|4 E2	Start	149,733,625 bp
Band	4|4 E2	End	149,787,028 bp
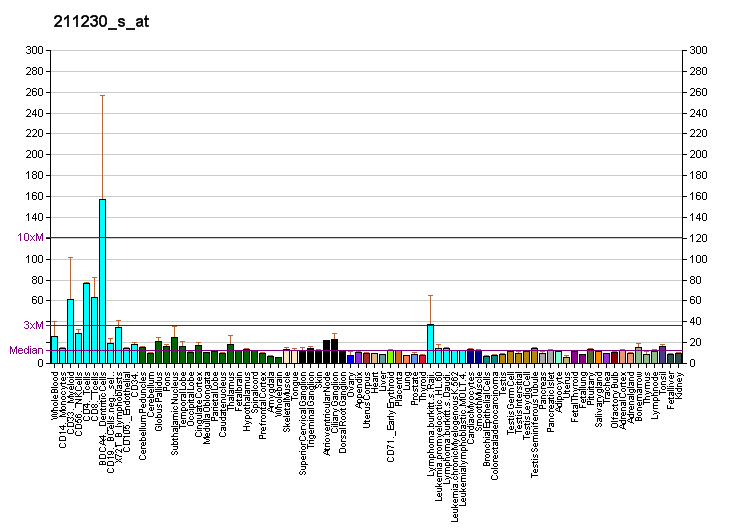

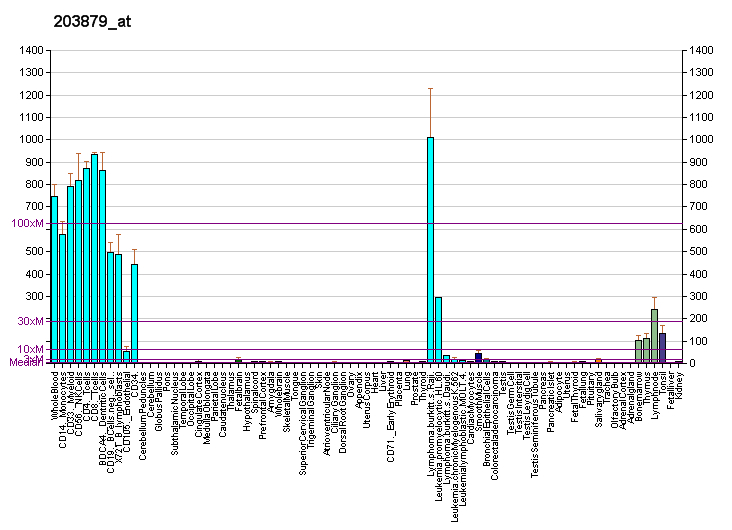
RNA expression pattern
Bgee	Human / Mouse (ortholog); Top expressed in: granulocyte; blood; lymph node; trabecular bone; mononuclear cell; spleen; monocyte; appendix; bone marrow cell; periodontal fiber / Top expressed in: granulocyte; lumbar spinal ganglion; zygote; secondary oocyte; mesenteric lymph nodes; primary oocyte; spleen; blood; thymus; stroma of bone marrow; More reference expression data
BioGPS	More reference expression data
Gene ontology
Molecular function	transferase activity; nucleotide binding; 1-phosphatidylinositol-4-phosphate 3-kinase activity; protein binding; ATP binding; kinase activity; phosphatidylinositol-4,5-bisphosphate 3-kinase activity; 1-phosphatidylinositol-3-kinase activity; phosphatidylinositol 3-kinase activity; phosphatidylinositol-3,4-bisphosphate 5-kinase activity
Cellular component	phosphatidylinositol 3-kinase complex; cytosol; plasma membrane; mast cell granule; cytoplasm; membrane; intracellular anatomical structure
Biological process	B cell receptor signaling pathway; cell differentiation; adaptive immune response; respiratory burst involved in defense response; B cell chemotaxis; immune system process; positive regulation of cell migration; T cell chemotaxis; cytokine production; natural killer cell activation; mast cell chemotaxis; neutrophil chemotaxis; chemotaxis; T cell differentiation; phosphatidylinositol phosphate biosynthetic process; positive regulation of gene expression; natural killer cell chemotaxis; mast cell differentiation; mast cell degranulation; innate immune response; inflammatory response; neutrophil extravasation; T cell receptor signaling pathway; T cell activation; signal transduction; natural killer cell differentiation; B cell activation; phosphatidylinositol-3-phosphate biosynthetic process; axon guidance; phosphorylation; protein phosphorylation; platelet activation; positive regulation of neutrophil apoptotic process; phosphatidylinositol-mediated signaling; positive regulation of protein kinase B signaling; phosphatidylinositol 3-kinase signaling; cytokine-mediated signaling pathway; negative regulation of gene expression; cell migration; positive regulation of phosphatidylinositol 3-kinase signaling; phosphatidylinositol biosynthetic process
Sources:Amigo / QuickGO
Orthologs
Databases	NCBI: entry; OMA: entry
Species	Human	Mouse
Entrez	5293	18707
Ensembl	ENSG00000171608	ENSMUSG00000039936
UniProt	O00329	O35904
RefSeq (mRNA)	NM_005026; NM_001350234; NM_001350235	NM_001029837; NM_001164049; NM_001164050; NM_001164051; NM_001164052 NM_008840
RefSeq (protein)	NP_005017; NP_001337163; NP_001337164; NP_005017.3	NP_001025008; NP_001157521; NP_001157522; NP_001157523; NP_001157524 NP_032866
Location (UCSC)	Chr 1: 9.65 – 9.73 Mb	Chr 4: 149.73 – 149.79 Mb
PubMed search
- Wikidata
View/Edit Human	View/Edit Mouse

Phosphatidylinositol-4,5-bisphosphate 3-kinase catalytic subunit delta isoform also known as phosphoinositide 3-kinase (PI3K) delta isoform or p110δ is an enzyme that in humans is encoded by the PIK3CD gene.

p110δ regulates immune function. In contrast to the other class IA PI3Ks p110α and p110β, p110δ is principally expressed in leukocytes (white blood cells). Genetic and pharmacological inactivation of p110δ has revealed that this enzyme is important for the function of T cells, B cell, mast cells and neutrophils. Hence, p110δ is a promising target for drugs that aim to prevent or treat inflammation, autoimmunity and transplant rejection.

Phosphoinositide 3-kinases (PI3Ks) phosphorylate the 3-prime OH position of the inositol ring of inositol lipids. The class I PI3Ks display a broad phosphoinositide lipid substrate specificity and include p110α, p110β and p110γ. p110α and p110β interact with SH2/SH3-domain-containing p85 adaptor proteins and with GTP-bound Ras.

== Biochemistry ==
Like the other class IA PI3Ks, p110δ is a catalytic subunit, whose activity and subcellular localisation are controlled by an associated p85α, p55α, p50α or p85β regulatory subunit. The p55γ regulatory subunit is not thought to be expressed at significant levels in immune cells. There is no evidence for selective association between p110α, p110β or p110δ for any particular regulatory subunit. The class IA regulatory subunits (collectively referred to here as p85) bind to proteins that have been phosphorylated on tyrosines. Tyrosine kinases often operate near the plasma membrane and hence control the recruitment of p110δ to the plasma membrane where its substrate PtdIns(4,5)P2 is found. The conversion of PtdIns(4,5)P2 to PtdIns(3,4,5)P3 triggers signal transduction cascades controlled by PKB (also known as Akt), Tec family kinases and other proteins that contain PH domains. In immune cells, antigen receptors, cytokine receptors and costimulatory and accessory receptors stimulate tyrosine kinase activity and hence all have the potential to initiate PI3K signalling.

== Functions ==
For reasons that are not well understood, p110δ appears to be activated in preference to p110α and p110β in a number of immune cells. The following is a brief summary of the role of p110δ in selected leukocyte subsets.

=== T cells ===
In T cells, the antigen receptor (TCR) and costimulatory receptors (CD28 and ICOS) are thought to be main receptors responsible for recruiting and activating p110δ. Genetic inactivation of p110δ in mice causes T cells to be less responsive to antigen as determined by their reduced ability to proliferate and secrete interleukin 2. T cell specific deletion of p110δ has revealed its role in antibody responses. This may in part result from incomplete assembly of other signalling proteins at the immune synapse. The TCR cannot stimulate the phosphorylation of Akt in that absence of p110δ activity.

=== B cells ===
p110δ is a regulator of B cell proliferation and function. p110δ-deficient mice have deficient antibody responses. They also lack to B cell subsets: B1 cells (found in body cavities such as the peritoneum) and marginal zone B cells, found in the periphery of spleen follicles).

=== Mast cells ===
p110δ controls mast cell release of the granules responsible for allergic reactions. Thus inhibition of p110δ reduces allergic responses.

=== Neutrophils ===
In conjunction with p110γ, p110δ controls the release of reactive oxygen species in neutrophils.

=== Dendritic cells ===
p110δ controls lipopolysaccharide induced Toll-like-receptor-4 mediated innate immune responses in dendritic cells and mice carrying an inactive p110δ is susceptible to lipopolysaccharide mediated endotoxin shock.

== Activated PI3K delta syndrome ==
Inherited mutations in the PIK3CD gene which increase p110δ catalytic activity cause a primary immunodeficiency syndrome called APDS or PASLI.

== Pharmacology ==
US pharmaceutical company ICOS produced a selective inhibitor of p110δ called IC87114. This inhibitor selectively impairs B cell, mast cell and neutrophil functions and is therefore a potential immune-modulator.

The p110δ inhibitor idelalisib was developed by Gilead Sciences. Idelalisib in combination with rituximab showed favourable progression free survival in a phase III clinical trial for chronic lymphocytic leukemia (CLL) compared with patients that received rituximab and placebo.

In July 2014 idelalisib was approved by the FDA as a treatment for CLL patients.

In September 2017 copanlisib, inhibiting predominantly p110α and p110δ, got FDA approval for the treatment of adult patients with relapsed follicular lymphoma (FL) who have received at least two prior systemic therapies.

In September 2018 duvelisib was approved by the FDA as a treatment for relapsed or refractory CLL, and relapsed follicular lymphoma (FL) patients, who have received at least two prior therapies.

A 2015 study found that p110δ inhibitors had a side-effect of boosting mouse immune responses against multiple cancers, including both solid and hematological types. Breast cancer mice survival times nearly doubled and spread significantly less, with far fewer and smaller tumors. Post-surgical survival also improved. Subject immune systems could also develop an effective memory response, extending protection.

== Interactions ==
PIK3CD interacts with PIK3R1, and PIK3R2.

== See also ==
- Phosphoinositide 3-kinase inhibitor
