= Alpelisib =

Chemical compound

Clinical data
- Pronunciation: /ˌælpəˈlɪsɪb/ AL-pə-LIS-ib
- Trade names: Piqray, Vijoice
- Other names: BYL719
- AHFS/Drugs.com: Monograph
- MedlinePlus: a619036
- License data: US DailyMed: Alpelisib
- Pregnancy category: AU: D
- Routes of administration: By mouth
- ATC code: L01EM03 (WHO)

Legal status
- Legal status: AU: S4 (Prescription only); CA: ℞-only; US: ℞-only; EU: Rx-only

Identifiers
- IUPAC name: (2S)-1-N-[4-Methyl-5-[2-(1,1,1-trifluoro-2-methylpropan-2-yl)pyridin-4-yl]-1,3-thiazol-2-yl]pyrrolidine-1,2-dicarboxamide
- CAS Number: 1217486-61-7
- PubChem CID: 56649450
- DrugBank: DB12015
- ChemSpider: 28424123
- UNII: 08W5N2C97Q
- KEGG: D11011
- ChEBI: CHEBI:93752
- ChEMBL: ChEMBL2396661
- CompTox Dashboard (EPA): DTXSID70153355
- ECHA InfoCard: 100.233.704

Chemical and physical data
- Formula: C_{19}H_{22}F_{3}N_{5}O_{2}S
- Molar mass: 441.47 g·mol^{−1}
- 3D model (JSmol): Interactive image
- SMILES: CC1=C(SC(=N1)NC(=O)N2CCCC2C(=O)N)C3=CC(=NC=C3)C(C)(C)C(F)(F)F
- InChI: InChI=1S/C19H22F3N5O2S/c1-10-14(11-6-7-24-13(9-11)18(2,3)19(20,21)22)30-16(25-10)26-17(29)27-8-4-5-12(27)15(23)28/h6-7,9,12H,4-5,8H2,1-3H3,(H2,23,28)(H,25,26,29)/t12-/m0/s1; Key:STUWGJZDJHPWGZ-LBPRGKRZSA-N

Alpelisib, sold under the brand name Piqray among others, is an anti-cancer medication used to treat certain types of breast cancer. It is used together with fulvestrant. It is taken by mouth. It is sold by Novartis.

Common side effects include high blood sugar, kidney problems, diarrhea, rash, low blood cells, liver problems, pancreatitis, vomiting, and hair loss. It is an alpha-specific PI3K inhibitor. It was approved for medical use in the United States in May 2019.

== Medical uses ==
In the United States, alpelisib is indicated in combination with fulvestrant for the treatment of postmenopausal women, and men, with hormone receptor (HR)-positive, human epidermal growth factor receptor 2 (HER2)-negative, PIK3CA-mutated, advanced or metastatic breast cancer as detected by an FDA-approved test following progression on or after an endocrine-based regimen.

In the European Union, alpelisib is indicated in combination with fulvestrant for the treatment of postmenopausal women, and men, with hormone receptor (HR)‑positive, human epidermal growth factor receptor 2 (HER2)‑negative, locally advanced or metastatic breast cancer with a PIK3CA mutation after disease progression following endocrine therapy as monotherapy.

In April 2022, the indication for alpelisib was expanded in the US to include the treatment of severe manifestations of PIK3CA-related overgrowth spectrum (PROS) in those who require systemic therapy.

== History ==
The efficacy of alpelisib was studied in the SOLAR-1 trial (NCT02437318), a randomized trial of 572 postmenopausal women and men with HR-positive, HER2-negative, advanced or metastatic breast cancer whose cancer had progressed while on or after receiving an aromatase inhibitor.

== Society and culture ==
=== Legal status ===
Alpelisib was approved for medical use in the United States in May 2019, in Australia in March 2020, and in the European Union in July 2020.

The FDA granted the application for alpelisib priority review designation and granted approval of Piqray to Novartis. The FDA granted approval of the therascreen PIK3CA RGQ PCR Kit to Qiagen Manchester.

In May 2020, the Committee for Medicinal Products for Human Use (CHMP) of the European Medicines Agency adopted a positive opinion, recommending the granting of a marketing authorization for the medicinal product alpelisib (Piqray), intended for the treatment of locally advanced or metastatic breast cancer with a PIK3CA mutation. The applicant for this medicinal product is Novartis Europharm Limited. Alpelisib was authorized for medical use in the European Union in July 2020.

In May 2026, the Committee for Medicinal Products for Human Use of the European Medicines Agency adopted a positive opinion, recommending the granting of a conditional marketing authorization for the medicinal product Vijoice, intended for the treatment of adults and children aged two years of age and older with severe or life-threatening manifestations of PIK3CA-related overgrowth spectrum (PROS) who require systemic therapy. The applicant for Vijoice is Novartis Europharm Limited. Alpelisib was authorized for medical use in the European Union in July 2026.
