= P110α =

Human protein-coding gene

PIK3CA
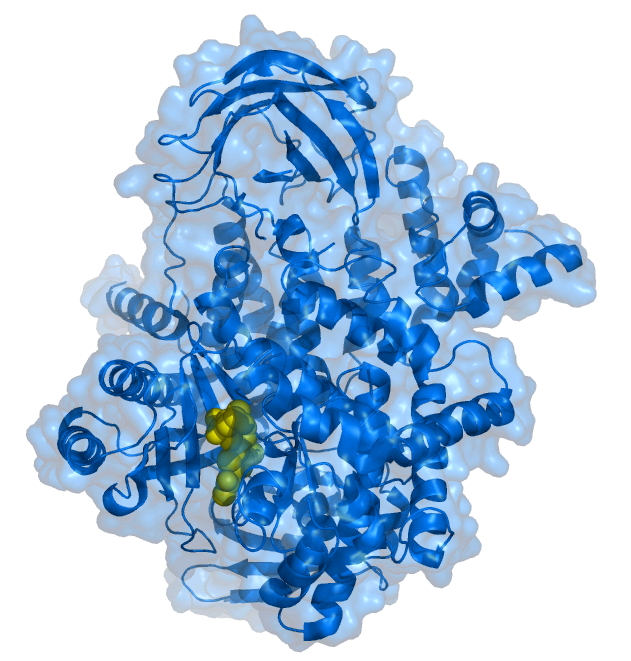

Identifiers
- Aliases: PIK3CA, CLOVE, CWS5, MCAP, MCM, MCMTC, PI3K, p110-alpha, PI3K-alpha, phosphatidylinositol-4,5-bisphosphate 3-kinase catalytic subunit alpha, CLAPO, CCM4
- External IDs: OMIM: 171834; MGI: 1206581; GeneCards: PIK3CA
Available structures
PDB	Ortholog search: PDBe RCSB
PDB	List of PDB id codes 2ENQ, 2RD0, 3HHM, 3HIZ, 3ZIM, 4JPS, 4L1B, 4L23, 4L2Y, 4OVU, 4OVV, 4TUU, 4TV3, 4WAF, 4YKN, 5DXH, 5DXT, 5FI4, 4ZOP
Enzyme activity
EC #	BRENDA	ExPASy	KEGG	MetaCyc
2.7.1.137	↗	↗	↗	↗
2.7.1.153	↗	↗	↗	↗
2.7.11.1	↗	↗	↗	↗

Gene location (Human)
Chr.	Chromosome 3 (human)
Band	3q26.32	Start	179,148,114 bp
Band	3q26.32	End	179,240,093 bp

Gene location (Mouse)
Chr.	Chromosome 3 (mouse)
Band	3 A3|3 15.7 cM	Start	32,451,820 bp
Band	3 A3|3 15.7 cM	End	32,522,635 bp
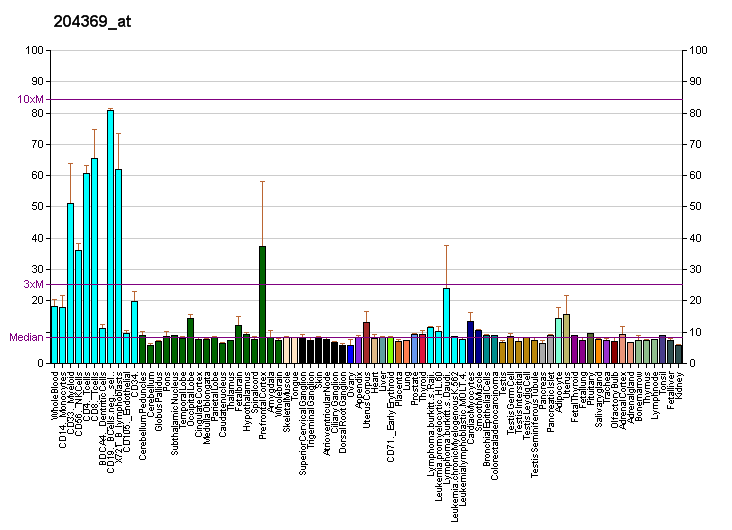
RNA expression pattern
Bgee	Human / Mouse (ortholog); Top expressed in: Achilles tendon; gonad; testicle; tendon of biceps brachii; ventricular zone; secondary oocyte; ganglionic eminence; cartilage tissue; right ventricle; skin of hip / Top expressed in: Rostral migratory stream; lacrimal gland; iris; mammillary body; lobe of cerebellum; lateral geniculate nucleus; ascending aorta; cerebellar vermis; genital tubercle; ciliary body; More reference expression data
BioGPS	More reference expression data
Gene ontology
Molecular function	transferase activity; nucleotide binding; protein kinase activator activity; 1-phosphatidylinositol-4-phosphate 3-kinase activity; protein serine/threonine kinase activity; protein binding; insulin receptor substrate binding; ATP binding; 1-phosphatidylinositol-3-kinase activity; phosphatidylinositol-4,5-bisphosphate 3-kinase activity; kinase activity; phosphatidylinositol 3-kinase activity; phosphatidylinositol-3,4-bisphosphate 5-kinase activity
Cellular component	phosphatidylinositol 3-kinase complex; cytosol; phosphatidylinositol 3-kinase complex, class IA; plasma membrane; lamellipodium; cytoplasm; membrane
Biological process	negative regulation of neuron apoptotic process; cardiac muscle contraction; epidermal growth factor receptor signaling pathway; protein kinase B signaling; Fc-gamma receptor signaling pathway involved in phagocytosis; regulation of multicellular organism growth; T cell costimulation; hypomethylation of CpG island; positive regulation of peptidyl-serine phosphorylation; platelet activation; Fc-epsilon receptor signaling pathway; phosphatidylinositol phosphate biosynthetic process; vascular endothelial growth factor receptor signaling pathway; vasculature development; angiogenesis; insulin receptor signaling pathway via phosphatidylinositol 3-kinase; glucose metabolic process; phagocytosis; energy homeostasis; negative regulation of fibroblast apoptotic process; regulation of gene expression; liver development; adipose tissue development; regulation of cellular respiration; T cell receptor signaling pathway; activation of protein kinase activity; regulation of genetic imprinting; negative regulation of anoikis; cellular response to glucose stimulus; endothelial cell migration; phosphatidylinositol-mediated signaling; leukocyte migration; ERBB2 signaling pathway; phosphatidylinositol-3-phosphate biosynthetic process; axon guidance; negative regulation of macroautophagy; phosphorylation; positive regulation of TOR signaling; anoikis; adaptive immune response; protein phosphorylation; inflammatory response; innate immune response; cell chemotaxis; G protein-coupled receptor signaling pathway; positive regulation of protein kinase B signaling; phosphatidylinositol 3-kinase signaling; cytokine-mediated signaling pathway; cell migration; positive regulation of phosphatidylinositol 3-kinase signaling; phosphatidylinositol biosynthetic process; regulation of protein phosphorylation
Sources:Amigo / QuickGO
Orthologs
Databases	NCBI: entry; OMA: entry
Species	Human	Mouse
Entrez	5290	18706
Ensembl	ENSG00000121879	ENSMUSG00000027665
UniProt	P42336	P42337
RefSeq (mRNA)	NM_006218	NM_008839
RefSeq (protein)	NP_006209	NP_032865
Location (UCSC)	Chr 3: 179.15 – 179.24 Mb	Chr 3: 32.45 – 32.52 Mb
PubMed search
- Wikidata
View/Edit Human	View/Edit Mouse

The phosphatidylinositol-4,5-bisphosphate 3-kinase, catalytic subunit alpha (the HUGO-approved official symbol = PIK3CA; HGNC ID, HGNC:8975), also called p110α protein, is a class I PI 3-kinase catalytic subunit. The human p110α protein is encoded by the PIK3CA gene.

Its role was uncovered by molecular pathological epidemiology (MPE).

== Function ==
Phosphatidylinositol-4,5-bisphosphate 3-kinase (also called phosphatidylinositol 3-kinase (PI3K)) is composed of an 85 kDa regulatory subunit and a 110 kDa catalytic subunit. The protein encoded by this gene represents the catalytic subunit, which uses ATP to phosphorylate phosphatidylinositols (PtdIns), PtdIns4P and PtdIns(4,5)P2.

The involvement of p110α in human cancer has been hypothesized since 1995. Support for this hypothesis came from genetic and functional studies, including the discovery of common activating PIK3CA missense mutations in common human tumors. It has been found to be oncogenic and is implicated in cervical cancers. PIK3CA mutations are present in over one-third of breast cancers, with enrichment in the luminal and in human epidermal growth factor receptor 2-positive subtypes (HER2 +). The three hotspot mutation positions (GLU542, GLU545, and HIS1047) have been widely reported till date. While substantial preclinical data show an association with robust activation of the pathway and resistance to common therapies, clinical data do not indicate that such mutations are associated with high levels of pathway activation or with a poor prognosis. It is unknown whether the mutation predicts increased sensitivity to agents targeting the P3K pathway.

PIK3CA participates in a complex interaction within the tumor microenvironment in this phenomenon.

== Clinical characteristics ==
Due to the association between p110α and cancer, it may be an appropriate drug target. Pharmaceutical companies are designing and characterizing potential p110α isoform specific inhibitors.

The presence of [a] PIK3CA mutation may predict response to aspirin therapy for colorectal cancer.

Somatic activating mutations in PIK3CA are found in Klippel–Trénaunay syndrome and venous malformation.

PIK3CA-associated segmental overgrowth includes brain disorders such as macrocephaly-capillary malformation (MCAP) and hemimegalencephaly. It is also associated with congenital, lipomatous overgrowth of vascular malformations, epidermal nevi and skeletal/spinal anomalies (CLOVES syndrome) and fibroadipose hyperplasia (FH). The conditions are caused by heterozygous (usually somatic mosaic) mutations.

== Inhibition ==
All PI 3-kinases are inhibited by the drugs wortmannin and LY294002 but wortmannin shows better efficiency than LY294002 on the hotspot mutation positions.

Alpelisib and Inavolisib are PI3Kα (PIK3CA) selective inhibitor that are approved for treating breast cancer. Tersolisib (LY4064809), and zovegalisib (RLY-2608) are additional selective PI3Kα inhibitors that are currently undergoing clinical trials for solid tumors.

== Pharmacology ==
In September 2017 Copanlisib, inhibiting predominantly p110α and p110δ, got FDA approval for the treatment of adult patients with relapsed follicular lymphoma (FL) who have received at least two prior systemic therapies.

== See also ==
- Phosphoinositide 3-kinase
- Phosphoinositide 3-kinase inhibitor
- PIK3CA-related overgrowth spectrum

== Interactions ==
P110α has been shown to interact with:

- ARHGEF1,
- ADAP1,
- DGKZ,
- HRAS, and
- Lck.
