= PIK3CB =

Protein-coding gene in the species Homo sapiens

Identifiers
- Aliases: PIK3CB, P110BETA, PI3K, PI3KBETA, PIK3C1, phosphatidylinositol-4,5-bisphosphate 3-kinase catalytic subunit beta
- External IDs: OMIM: 602925; MGI: 1922019; GeneCards: PIK3CB
Enzyme activity
EC #	BRENDA	ExPASy	KEGG	MetaCyc
2.7.1.153	↗	↗	↗	↗
2.7.11.1	↗	↗	↗	↗

Gene location (Human)
Chr.	Chromosome 3 (human)
Band	3q22.3	Start	138,652,698 bp
Band	3q22.3	End	138,834,928 bp

Gene location (Mouse)
Chr.	Chromosome 9 (mouse)
Band	9|9 E3.3	Start	98,918,707 bp
Band	9|9 E3.3	End	99,022,674 bp
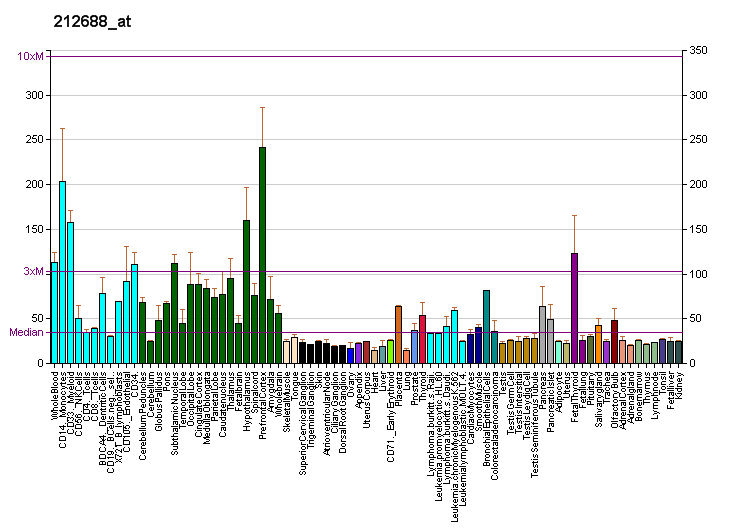

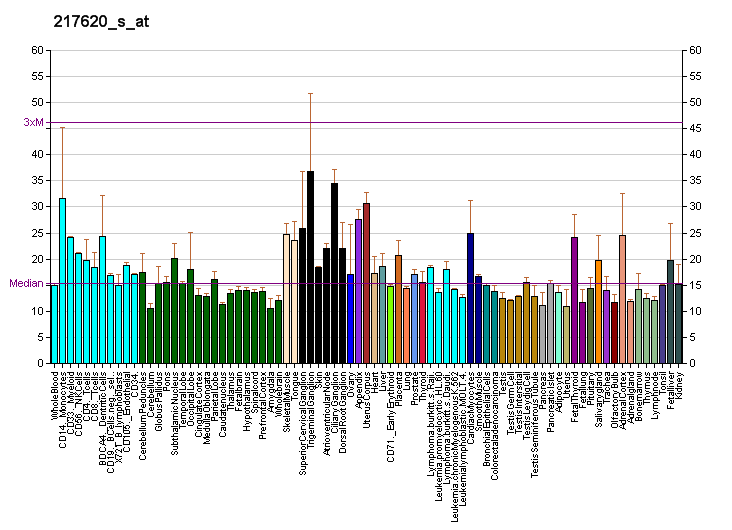
RNA expression pattern
Bgee	Human / Mouse (ortholog); Top expressed in: tendon of biceps brachii; internal globus pallidus; endothelial cell; middle temporal gyrus; Epithelium of choroid plexus; Brodmann area 23; lateral nuclear group of thalamus; kidney tubule; optic nerve; pons / Top expressed in: granulocyte; superior cervical ganglion; esophagus; interventricular septum; zygote; facial motor nucleus; morula; secondary oocyte; lip; dentate gyrus of hippocampal formation granule cell; More reference expression data
BioGPS	More reference expression data
Gene ontology
Molecular function	transferase activity; nucleotide binding; 1-phosphatidylinositol-4-phosphate 3-kinase activity; protein binding; insulin receptor substrate binding; ATP binding; phosphatidylinositol-4,5-bisphosphate 3-kinase activity; kinase activity; 1-phosphatidylinositol-3-kinase activity; phosphatidylinositol 3-kinase activity; phosphatidylinositol-3,4-bisphosphate 5-kinase activity
Cellular component	cytosol; phosphatidylinositol 3-kinase complex; plasma membrane; nucleolus; nucleus; midbody; cytoplasm; membrane; intracellular anatomical structure
Biological process	G protein-coupled receptor signaling pathway; embryonic cleavage; endocytosis; positive regulation of autophagy; Fc-gamma receptor signaling pathway involved in phagocytosis; transmembrane receptor protein tyrosine kinase signaling pathway; angiogenesis involved in wound healing; cellular calcium ion homeostasis; regulation of cell-matrix adhesion; platelet activation; autophagy; Fc-epsilon receptor signaling pathway; chemotaxis; phosphatidylinositol-3-phosphate biosynthetic process; phosphatidylinositol phosphate biosynthetic process; positive regulation of gene expression; vascular endothelial growth factor receptor signaling pathway; cell adhesion; response to wounding; endothelial cell proliferation; regulation of clathrin-dependent endocytosis; T cell receptor signaling pathway; platelet aggregation; cell migration; phosphatidylinositol-mediated signaling; leukocyte migration; signal transduction; homophilic cell adhesion via plasma membrane adhesion molecules; axon guidance; phosphorylation; adaptive immune response; inflammatory response; positive regulation of neutrophil apoptotic process; innate immune response; cell chemotaxis; positive regulation of protein kinase B signaling; phosphatidylinositol 3-kinase signaling; cytokine-mediated signaling pathway; protein phosphorylation; positive regulation of phosphatidylinositol 3-kinase signaling; phosphatidylinositol biosynthetic process
Sources:Amigo / QuickGO
Orthologs
Databases	NCBI: entry; OMA: entry
Species	Human	Mouse
Entrez	5291	74769
Ensembl	ENSG00000051382	ENSMUSG00000032462
UniProt	P42338	Q8BTI9
RefSeq (mRNA)	NM_001256045; NM_006219	NM_029094
RefSeq (protein)	NP_001242974; NP_006210	NP_083370
Location (UCSC)	Chr 3: 138.65 – 138.83 Mb	Chr 9: 98.92 – 99.02 Mb
PubMed search
- Wikidata
View/Edit Human	View/Edit Mouse

Phosphatidylinositol-4,5-bisphosphate 3-kinase catalytic subunit beta isoform is an enzyme that in humans is encoded by the PIK3CB gene.

Phosphoinositide 3-kinases (PI3Ks) phosphorylate the 3-prime OH position of the inositol ring of inositol lipids. They have been implicated as participants in signaling pathways regulating cell growth by virtue of their activation in response to various mitogenic stimuli. PI3Ks are composed of a 110-kD catalytic subunit, such as PIK3CB, and an 85-kD adaptor subunit (Hu et al., 1993).[supplied by OMIM]
