= MAP1LC3B =

Protein-coding gene in the species Homo sapiens

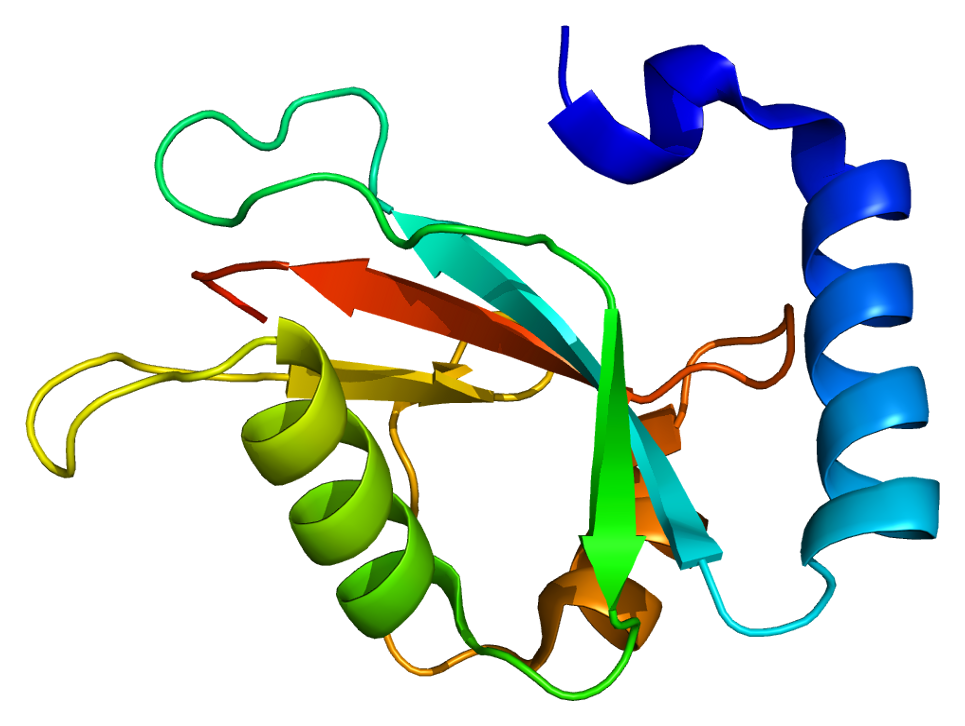

Identifiers
- Aliases: MAP1LC3B, ATG8F, LC3B, MAP1A/1BLC3, MAP1LC3B-a, microtubule associated protein 1 light chain 3 beta
- External IDs: OMIM: 609604; MGI: 1914693; GeneCards: MAP1LC3B
Available structures
| PDB | Ortholog search: PDBe RCSB |
| PDB | List of PDB id codes 1V49, 2LUE, 2ZJD, 3VTU, 3VTV, 3VTW, 3WAO, 3X0W, 4WAA, 5D94, 5DCN |

Gene location (Human)
| Chr. | Chromosome 16 (human) |
| Band | 16q24.2 | Start | 87,383,953 bp |
| Band | 16q24.2 | End | 87,404,779 bp |

Gene location (Mouse)
| Chr. | Chromosome 8 (mouse) |
| Band | 8|8 E1 | Start | 122,317,100 bp |
| Band | 8|8 E1 | End | 122,325,499 bp |
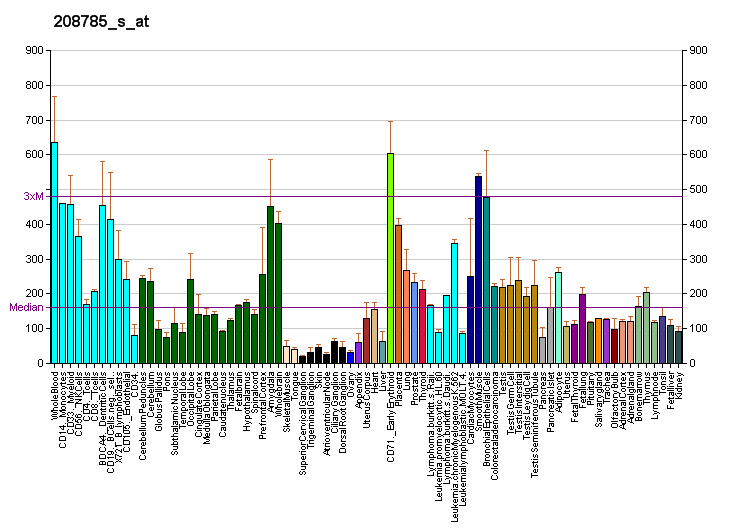

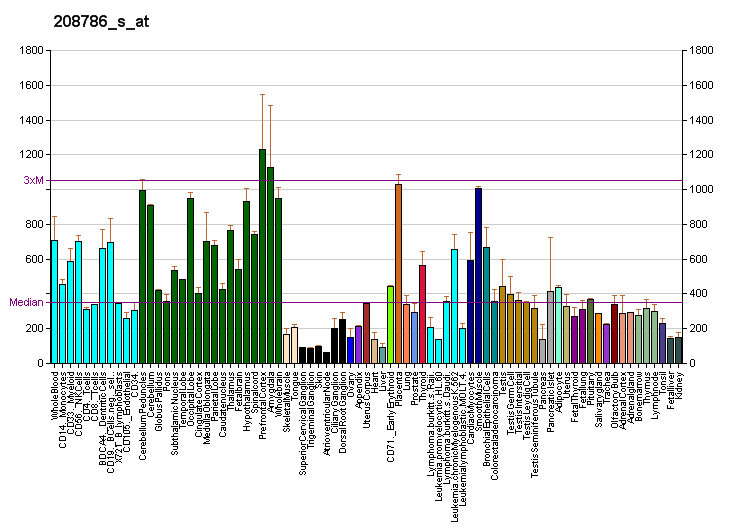
RNA expression pattern
| Bgee | Human / Mouse (ortholog); Top expressed in: paraflocculus of cerebellum; pars compacta; Brodmann area 10; pars reticulata; lateral nuclear group of thalamus; frontal pole; C1 segment; postcentral gyrus; external globus pallidus; pons / Top expressed in: external carotid artery; morula; deep cerebellar nuclei; internal carotid artery; medial vestibular nucleus; blastocyst; pontine nuclei; iris; ciliary body; dorsal tegmental nucleus; More reference expression data |
| BioGPS | More reference expression data |
Gene ontology
| Molecular function | protein binding; ubiquitin protein ligase binding; microtubule binding |
| Cellular component | cytoplasm; organelle membrane; membrane; intracellular anatomical structure; mitochondrion; axoneme; microtubule; cytoskeleton; cytoplasmic vesicle; endomembrane system; autophagosome membrane; cytosol; autophagosome; autolysosome |
| Biological process | autophagy of mitochondrion; autophagosome assembly; autophagy; cellular response to nitrogen starvation; cellular response to starvation; macroautophagy; autophagosome maturation; positive regulation of mucus secretion |
Sources:Amigo / QuickGO
Orthologs
| Databases | NCBI: entry; OMA: entry |
| Species | Human | Mouse |
| Entrez | 81631 | 67443 |
| Ensembl | ENSG00000140941 | ENSMUSG00000031812 |
| UniProt | Q9GZQ8 | Q9CQV6 |
| RefSeq (mRNA) | NM_022818 | NM_026160; NM_001364358 |
| RefSeq (protein) | NP_073729 | NP_080436; NP_001351287 |
| Location (UCSC) | Chr 16: 87.38 – 87.4 Mb | Chr 8: 122.32 – 122.33 Mb |
| PubMed search |
- Wikidata
| View/Edit Human | View/Edit Mouse |

Microtubule-associated proteins 1A/1B light chain 3B (hereafter referred to as LC3) is a protein that in humans is encoded by the MAP1LC3B gene. LC3 is a central protein in the autophagy pathway where it functions in autophagy substrate selection and autophagosome biogenesis. LC3 is the most widely used marker of autophagosomes.

== Discovery ==
LC3 was originally identified as a microtubule associated protein in rat brain. However it was later found that the primary function of LC3 is in autophagy, a process that involves the bulk degradation of cytoplasmic components.

=== The ATG8 protein family ===
MAP1LC3B is a member of the highly conserved ATG8 protein family. ATG8 proteins are present in all known eukaryotic organisms. The animal ATG8 family comprises three subfamilies: (i) microtubule-associated protein 1 light chain 3 (MAP1LC3); (ii) Golgi-associated ATPase enhancer of 16 kDa (GATE-16); and (iii) γ-amino-butyric acid receptor-associate protein (GABARAP). MAP1LC3B is one of the four genes in the MAP1LC3 subfamily (others include MAP1LC3A, MAP1LC3C, and MAP1LC3B2).

== Function ==
=== Cytoplasmic LC3 ===
Newly synthesized LC3's C-terminus is hydrolyzed by a cysteine protease called ATG4B exposing Gly120, termed LC3-I. LC3-I, through a series of ubiquitin-like reactions involving enzymes ATG7, ATG3, and ATG12-ATG5-ATG16, becomes conjugated to the head group of the lipid phosphatidylethanolamine. The lipid modified form of LC3, referred to as LC3-II, is believed to be involved in autophagosome membrane expansion and fusion events. However, the exact role of LC3 in the autophagic pathway is still discussed, and the question of whether LC3 is required for autophagy is debated since knockdown of MAP1LC3B is compensated by the other members of the MAP1LC3 subfamily. Previous studies showed that MAP1LC3B knock out mice develop normally, possibly due to a then unknown compensatory mechanism. Further work, however, demonstrated that LC3 is required for autophagy by simultaneously down-regulating all of the MAP1LC3 subfamily members. While yet another study argues that MAP1LC3 knockdown does not affect bulk autophagy, whereas its GABARAP family members are crucial for the process. LC3 also functions—together with autophagy receptors (e.g. SQSTM1)--in the selective capture of cargo for autophagic degradation. Independent of autophagosomes, a single soluble LC3 is associated with an approximately 500 kDa complex in the cytoplasm.

=== Nuclear LC3 ===
The importance of the nuclear functions of autophagy proteins should not be underestimated. A large pool of LC3 is present in the nucleus of a variety of different cell types. In response to starvation, nuclear LC3 is deacetylated and trafficked out of the nucleus into the cytoplasm where it functions in autophagy. Nuclear LC3 interacts with lamin B1, and participates in the degradation of nuclear lamina. LC3 is also enriched in nucleoli via its triple arginine motif, and associates with a number of different nuclear and nucleolar constituents including: MAP1B, tubulin, and several ribosomal proteins.

== Structure ==
LC3 shares structural homology with ubiquitin, and therefore has been termed a ubiquitin-like protein. LC3 has a LDS (LIR docking site)/hydrophobic binding interface in the N terminus which interacts with LIR (LC3 Interacting Region) containing proteins. This domain is rich in hydrophobic amino acids, the mutation of which impairs the ability of LC3 binding with LIR containing proteins, many of which are autophagy cargo adapter proteins. For example, sequestosome (SQSTM1) interacts with Phe 52 and Leu53 aminoacids present in hydrophobic binding interface of LC3 and any mutation of these amino acids prevents LC3 interaction with SQSTM1.
