= Programmed cell death =

Death of a cell mediated by intracellular program, often as part of development

Programmed cell death (PCD), sometimes referred to as cell suicide or cellular suicide, is the death of a cell as a result of events inside of a cell, such as apoptosis or autophagy. PCD is carried out in a biological process, which usually confers advantage during an organism's lifecycle. For example, the differentiation of fingers and toes in a developing human embryo occurs because cells between the fingers apoptose; the result is that the digits are separate. PCD serves fundamental functions during both plant and animal tissue development.

Apoptosis and autophagy are both forms of programmed cell death. Necrosis is the death of a cell caused by external factors such as trauma or infection and occurs in several different forms. Necrosis was long seen as a non-physiological process that occurs as a result of infection or injury, but in the 2000s, a form of programmed necrosis, called necroptosis, was recognized as an alternative form of programmed cell death. It is hypothesized that necroptosis can serve as a cell-death backup to apoptosis when the apoptosis signaling is blocked by endogenous or exogenous factors such as viruses or mutations. Most recently, other types of regulated necrosis have been discovered as well, which share several signaling events with necroptosis and apoptosis.

== History ==
The concept of "programmed cell-death" was used by Lockshin & Williams in 1964 in relation to insect tissue development, around eight years before "apoptosis" was coined. The term PCD has, however, been a source of confusion and Durand and Ramsey have developed the concept by providing mechanistic and evolutionary definitions. PCD has become the general terms that refers to all the different types of cell death that have a genetic component.

The first insight into the mechanism came from studying BCL2, the product of a putative oncogene activated by chromosome translocations often found in follicular lymphoma. Unlike other cancer genes, which promote cancer by stimulating cell proliferation, BCL2 promoted cancer by stopping lymphoma cells from being able to kill themselves.

PCD has been the subject of increasing attention and research efforts. This trend has been highlighted with the award of the 2002 Nobel Prize in Physiology or Medicine to Sydney Brenner (United Kingdom), H. Robert Horvitz (US) and John E. Sulston (UK).

== Types ==
Overview of signal transduction pathways involved in apoptosis

- Apoptosis or Type I cell-death.
- Autophagic cell death or Type II cell-death. (Cytoplasmic: characterized by the formation of large vacuoles that eat away organelles in a specific sequence prior to the destruction of the nucleus.)

=== Apoptosis ===
Apoptosis is the process of programmed cell death (PCD) that may occur in multicellular organisms. Biochemical events lead to characteristic cell changes (morphology) and death. These changes include blebbing, cell shrinkage, nuclear fragmentation, chromatin condensation, and chromosomal DNA fragmentation. It is now thought that -- in a developmental context -- cells are induced to positively commit suicide whilst in a homeostatic context; the absence of certain survival factors may provide the impetus for suicide. There appears to be some variation in the morphology and indeed the biochemistry of these suicide pathways; some treading the path of "apoptosis", others following a more generalized pathway to deletion, but both usually being genetically and synthetically motivated. There is some evidence that certain symptoms of "apoptosis" such as endonuclease activation can be spuriously induced without engaging a genetic cascade, however, presumably true apoptosis and programmed cell death must be genetically mediated. It is also becoming clear that mitosis and apoptosis are toggled or linked in some way and that the balance achieved depends on signals received from appropriate growth or survival factors.

==== Extrinsic vs. intrinsic pathways ====
There are two different potential pathways that may be followed when apoptosis is needed. There is the extrinsic pathway and the intrinsic pathway. Both pathways involve the use of caspases - crucial to cell death.

===== Extrinsic pathway =====
The extrinsic pathway involves specific receptor ligand interaction. Either the FAS ligand binds to the FAS receptor or the TNF-alpha ligand can bind to the TNF receptor. In both situations there is the activation of initiator caspase. The extrinsic pathway can be activated in two ways. The first way is through fast ligand TNF-alpha binding or through a cytotoxic T-cell. The cytotoxic T-cell can attach itself to a membrane, facilitating the release of granzyme B. Granzyme B perforates the target cell membrane and in turn allows the release of perforin. Finally, perforin creates a pore in the membrane, and releases the caspases which leads to the activation of caspase 3. This initiator caspase may cause the cleaving of inactive caspase 3, causing it to become cleaved caspase 3. This is the final molecule needed to trigger cell death.

===== Intrinsic pathway =====
The intrinsic pathway is caused by cell damage such as DNA damage or UV exposure. This pathway takes place in the mitochondria and is mediated by sensors called Bcl sensors, and two proteins called BAX and BAK. These proteins are found in a majority of higher mammals as they are able to pierce the mitochondrial outer membrane -- making them an integral part of mediating cell death by apoptosis. They do this by orchestrating the formation of pores within the membrane -- essential to the release of cytochrome c. However, cytochrome c is only released if the mitochondrial membrane is compromised. Once cytochrome c is detected, the apoptosome complex is formed. This complex activates the executioner caspase which causes cell death. This killing of the cells may be essential as it prevents cellular overgrowth which can result in disease such as cancer. There are another two proteins worth mentioning that inhibit the release of cytochrome c in the mitochondria. Bcl-2 and Bcl-xl are anti-apoptotic and therefore prevent cell death. There is a potential mutation that can occur in that causes the overactivity of Bcl-2. It is the translocation between chromosomes 14 and 18. This over activity can result in the development of follicular lymphoma.

=== Autophagy ===
Macroautophagy, often referred to as autophagy, is a catabolic process that results in the autophagosomal-lysosomal degradation of bulk cytoplasmic contents, abnormal protein aggregates, and excess or damaged organelles.

Autophagy is generally activated by conditions of nutrient deprivation but has also been associated with physiological as well as pathological processes such as development, differentiation, neurodegenerative diseases, stress, infection and cancer.

==== Mechanism ====
A critical regulator of autophagy induction is the kinase mTOR, which when activated, suppresses autophagy and when not activated promotes it. Three related serine/threonine kinases, UNC-51-like kinase -1, -2, and -3 (ULK1, ULK2, UKL3), which play a similar role as the yeast Atg1, act downstream of the mTOR complex. ULK1 and ULK2 form a large complex with the mammalian homolog of an autophagy-related (Atg) gene product (mAtg13) and the scaffold protein FIP200. Class III PI3K complex, containing hVps34, Beclin-1, p150 and Atg14-like protein or ultraviolet irradiation resistance-associated gene (UVRAG), is required for the induction of autophagy.

The ATG genes control the autophagosome formation through ATG12-ATG5 and LC3-II (ATG8-II) complexes. ATG12 is conjugated to ATG5 in a ubiquitin-like reaction that requires ATG7 and ATG10. The Atg12–Atg5 conjugate then interacts non-covalently with ATG16 to form a large complex. LC3/ATG8 is cleaved at its C terminus by ATG4 protease to generate the cytosolic LC3-I. LC3-I is conjugated to phosphatidylethanolamine (PE) also in a ubiquitin-like reaction that requires Atg7 and Atg3. The lipidated form of LC3, known as LC3-II, is attached to the autophagosome membrane.

Autophagy and apoptosis are connected both positively and negatively, and extensive crosstalk exists between the two. During nutrient deficiency, autophagy functions as a pro-survival mechanism, however, excessive autophagy may lead to cell death, a process morphologically distinct from apoptosis. Several pro-apoptotic signals, such as TNF, TRAIL, and FADD, also induce autophagy. Additionally, Bcl-2 inhibits Beclin-1-dependent autophagy, thereby functioning both as a pro-survival and as an anti-autophagic regulator.

=== Other types ===
Besides the above two types of PCD, other pathways have been discovered. Called "non-apoptotic programmed cell-death" (or "caspase-independent programmed cell-death" or "necroptosis"), these alternative routes to death are as efficient as apoptosis and can function as either backup mechanisms or the main type of PCD.

Other forms of programmed cell death include anoikis, almost identical to apoptosis except in its induction; cornification, a form of cell death exclusive to the epidermis; excitotoxicity; ferroptosis, an iron-dependent form of cell death and Wallerian degeneration.

Necroptosis is a programmed form of necrosis, or inflammatory cell death. Conventionally, necrosis is associated with unprogrammed cell death resulting from cellular damage or infiltration by pathogens, in contrast to orderly, programmed cell death via apoptosis. Nemosis is another programmed form of necrosis that takes place in fibroblasts.

Eryptosis is a form of suicidal erythrocyte death.

Aponecrosis is a hybrid of apoptosis and necrosis and refers to an incomplete apoptotic process that is completed by necrosis.

NETosis is the process of cell-death generated by neutrophils, resulting in NETs.

Paraptosis is another type of nonapoptotic cell death that is mediated by MAPK through the activation of IGF-1. It's characterized by the intracellular formation of vacuoles and swelling of mitochondria.

Pyroptosis, an inflammatory type of cell death, is uniquely mediated by caspase 1, an enzyme not involved in apoptosis, in response to infection by certain microorganisms.

Plant cells undergo particular processes of PCD similar to autophagic cell death. However, some common features of PCD are highly conserved in both plants and metazoa.

== Atrophic factors ==
An atrophic factor is a force that causes a cell to die. Only natural forces on the cell are considered to be atrophic factors, whereas, for example, agents of mechanical or chemical abuse or lysis of the cell are considered not to be atrophic factors. Common types of atrophic factors are:

1. Decreased workload
2. Loss of innervation
3. Diminished blood supply
4. Inadequate nutrition
5. Loss of endocrine stimulation
6. Senility
7. Compression

== Role in the development of the nervous system ==
Dying cells in the proliferate zone

The initial expansion of the developing nervous system is counterbalanced by the removal of neurons and their processes. During the development of the nervous system almost 50% of developing neurons are naturally removed by programmed cell death (PCD). PCD in the nervous system was first recognized in 1896 by John Beard. Since then several theories were proposed to understand its biological significance during neural development.

=== Role in neural development ===
PCD in the developing nervous system has been observed in proliferating as well as post-mitotic cells. One theory suggests that PCD is an adaptive mechanism to regulate the number of progenitor cells. In humans, PCD in progenitor cells starts at gestational week 7 and remains until the first trimester. This process of cell death has been identified in the germinal areas of the cerebral cortex, cerebellum, thalamus, brainstem, and spinal cord among other regions. At gestational weeks 19–23, PCD is observed in post-mitotic cells. The prevailing theory explaining this observation is the neurotrophic theory which states that PCD is required to optimize the connection between neurons and their afferent inputs and efferent targets. Another theory proposes that developmental PCD in the nervous system occurs in order to correct for errors in neurons that have migrated ectopically, innervated incorrect targets, or have axons that have gone awry during path finding. It is possible that PCD during the development of the nervous system serves different functions determined by the developmental stage, cell type, and even species.

=== The neurotrophic theory ===
The neurotrophic theory is the leading hypothesis used to explain the role of programmed cell death in the developing nervous system. It postulates that in order to ensure optimal innervation of targets, a surplus of neurons is first produced which then compete for limited quantities of protective neurotrophic factors and only a fraction survive while others die by programmed cell death. Furthermore, the theory states that predetermined factors regulate the amount of neurons that survive and the size of the innervating neuronal population directly correlates to the influence of their target field.

The underlying idea that target cells secrete attractive or inducing factors and that their growth cones have a chemotactic sensitivity was first put forth by Santiago Ramon y Cajal in 1892. Cajal presented the idea as an explanation for the "intelligent force" axons appear to take when finding their target but admitted that he had no empirical data. The theory gained more attraction when experimental manipulation of axon targets yielded death of all innervating neurons. This developed the concept of target derived regulation which became the main tenet in the neurotrophic theory. Experiments that further supported this theory led to the identification of the first neurotrophic factor, nerve growth factor (NGF).

=== Peripheral versus central nervous system ===
Cell death in the peripheral vs central nervous system

Different mechanisms regulate PCD in the peripheral nervous system (PNS) versus the central nervous system (CNS). In the PNS, innervation of the target is proportional to the amount of the target-released neurotrophic factors NGF and NT3. Expression of neurotrophin receptors, TrkA and TrkC, is sufficient to induce apoptosis in the absence of their ligands. Therefore, it is speculated that PCD in the PNS is dependent on the release of neurotrophic factors and thus follows the concept of the neurotrophic theory.

Programmed cell death in the CNS is not dependent on external growth factors but instead relies on intrinsically derived cues. In the neocortex, a 4:1 ratio of excitatory to inhibitory interneurons is maintained by apoptotic machinery that appears to be independent of the environment. Supporting evidence came from an experiment where interneuron progenitors were either transplanted into the mouse neocortex or cultured in vitro. Transplanted cells died at the age of two weeks, the same age at which endogenous interneurons undergo apoptosis. Regardless of the size of the transplant, the fraction of cells undergoing apoptosis remained constant. Furthermore, disruption of TrkB, a receptor for brain derived neurotrophic factor (Bdnf), did not affect cell death. It has also been shown that in mice null for the proapoptotic factor Bax (Bcl-2-associated X protein) a larger percentage of interneurons survived compared to wild type mice. Together these findings indicate that programmed cell death in the CNS partly exploits Bax-mediated signaling and is independent of BDNF and the environment. Apoptotic mechanisms in the CNS are still not well understood, yet it is thought that apoptosis of interneurons is a self-autonomous process.

=== Nervous system development in its absence ===
Programmed cell death can be reduced or eliminated in the developing nervous system by the targeted deletion of pro-apoptotic genes or by the overexpression of anti-apoptotic genes. The absence or reduction of PCD can cause serious anatomical malformations but can also result in minimal consequences depending on the gene targeted, neuronal population, and stage of development. Excess progenitor cell proliferation that leads to gross brain abnormalities is often lethal, as seen in caspase-3 or caspase-9 knockout mice which develop exencephaly in the forebrain. The brainstem, spinal cord, and peripheral ganglia of these mice develop normally, however, suggesting that the involvement of caspases in PCD during development depends on the brain region and cell type. Knockout or inhibition of apoptotic protease activating factor 1 (APAF1), also results in malformations and increased embryonic lethality. Manipulation of apoptosis regulator proteins Bcl-2 and Bax (overexpression of Bcl-2 or deletion of Bax) produces an increase in the number of neurons in certain regions of the nervous system such as the retina, trigeminal nucleus, cerebellum, and spinal cord. However, PCD of neurons due to Bax deletion or Bcl-2 overexpression does not result in prominent morphological or behavioral abnormalities in mice. For example, mice overexpressing Bcl-2 have generally normal motor skills and vision and only show impairment in complex behaviors such as learning and anxiety. The normal behavioral phenotypes of these mice suggest that an adaptive mechanism may be involved to compensate for the excess neurons.

=== Invertebrates and vertebrates ===
A conserved apoptotic pathway in nematodes, mammals and fruitflies

Learning about PCD in various species is essential in understanding the evolutionary basis and reason for apoptosis in development of the nervous system. During the development of the invertebrate nervous system, PCD plays different roles in different species. The similarity of the asymmetric cell death mechanism in the nematode and the leech indicates that PCD may have an evolutionary significance in the development of the nervous system. In the nematode, PCD occurs in the first hour of development leading to the elimination of 12% of non-gonadal cells including neuronal lineages. Cell death in arthropods occurs first in the nervous system when ectoderm cells differentiate and one daughter cell becomes a neuroblast and the other undergoes apoptosis. Furthermore, sex targeted cell death leads to different neuronal innervation of specific organs in males and females. In Drosophila, PCD is essential in segmentation and specification during development.

In contrast to invertebrates, the mechanism of programmed cell death is found to be more conserved in vertebrates. Extensive studies performed on various vertebrates show that PCD of neurons and glia occurs in most parts of the nervous system during development. It has been observed before and during synaptogenesis in the central nervous system as well as the peripheral nervous system. However, there are a few differences between vertebrate species. For example, mammals exhibit extensive arborization followed by PCD in the retina while birds do not. Although synaptic refinement in vertebrate systems is largely dependent on PCD, other evolutionary mechanisms also play a role.

== In plant tissue ==
Programmed cell death in plants has a number of molecular similarities to animal apoptosis, but it also has differences, the most obvious being the presence of a cell wall and the lack of an immune system that removes the pieces of the dead cell. Instead of an immune response, the dying cell synthesizes substances to break itself down and places them in a vacuole that ruptures as the cell dies.

In "APL regulates vascular tissue identity in Arabidopsis", Martin Bonke and his colleagues had stated that one of the two long-distance transport systems in vascular plants, xylem, consists of several cell-types "the differentiation of which involves deposition of elaborate cell-wall thickenings and programmed cell-death." The authors emphasize that the products of plant PCD play an important structural role.

Basic morphological and biochemical features of PCD have been conserved in both plant and animal kingdoms. Specific types of plant cells carry out unique cell-death programs. These have common features with animal apoptosis—for instance, nuclear DNA degradation—but they also have their own peculiarities, such as nuclear degradation triggered by the collapse of the vacuole in tracheary elements of the xylem.

Janneke Balk and Christopher J. Leaver, of the Department of Plant Sciences, University of Oxford, carried out research on mutations in the mitochondrial genome of sun-flower cells. Results of this research suggest that mitochondria play the same key role in vascular plant PCD as in other eukaryotic cells.

=== PCD in pollen prevents inbreeding ===
During pollination, plants enforce self-incompatibility (SI) as an important means to prevent self-fertilization. Research on the corn poppy (Papaver rhoeas) has revealed that proteins in the pistil on which the pollen lands, interact with pollen and trigger PCD in incompatible (i.e., self) pollen. The researchers, Steven G. Thomas and Vernonica E. Franklin-Tong, also found that the response involves rapid inhibition of pollen-tube growth, followed by PCD.

== In slime molds ==
The social slime mold Dictyostelium discoideum has the peculiarity of either adopting a predatory amoeba-like behavior in its unicellular form or coalescing into a mobile slug-like form when dispersing the spores that will give birth to the next generation.

The stalk is composed of dead cells that have undergone a type of PCD that shares many features of an autophagic cell-death: massive vacuoles forming inside cells, a degree of chromatin condensation, but no DNA fragmentation. The structural role of the residues left by the dead cells is reminiscent of the products of PCD in plant tissue.

D. discoideum is a slime mold, part of a branch that might have emerged from eukaryotic ancestors about a billion years before the present. It seems that they emerged after the ancestors of green plants and the ancestors of fungi and animals had differentiated. But, in addition to their place in the evolutionary tree, the fact that PCD has been observed in the humble, simple, six-chromosome D. discoideum has additional significance: It permits the study of a developmental PCD path that does not depend on caspases characteristic of apoptosis.

== Evolutionary origin of mitochondrial apoptosis ==
The occurrence of programmed cell death in protists is possible, but it remains controversial. Some categorize death in those organisms as unregulated apoptosis-like cell death.

Biologists had long suspected that mitochondria originated from bacteria that had been incorporated as endosymbionts ("living together inside") of larger eukaryotic cells. It was Lynn Margulis who from 1967 on championed this theory, which has since become widely accepted. The most convincing evidence for this theory is the fact that mitochondria possess their own DNA and are equipped with genes and replication apparatus.

This evolutionary step would have been risky for the primitive eukaryotic cells, which began to engulf the energy-producing bacteria, as well as a perilous step for the ancestors of mitochondria, which began to invade their proto-eukaryotic hosts. This process is still evident today, between human white blood cells and bacteria. Most of the time, invading bacteria are destroyed by the white blood cells; however, it is not uncommon for the chemical warfare waged by prokaryotes to succeed, with the consequence known as infection by its resulting damage.

One of these rare evolutionary events, about two billion years before the present, made it possible for certain eukaryotes and energy-producing prokaryotes to coexist and mutually benefit from their symbiosis.

Mitochondriate eukaryotic cells live poised between life and death, because mitochondria still retain their repertoire of molecules that can trigger cell suicide. It is not clear why apoptotic machinery is maintained in the extant unicellular organisms. This process has evolved to happen only when programmed to cells (such as feedback from neighbors, stress or DNA damage), mitochondria release caspase activators that trigger the cell-death-inducing biochemical cascade. As such, the cell suicide mechanism is now crucial to all of our lives.

== DNA damage and apoptosis ==
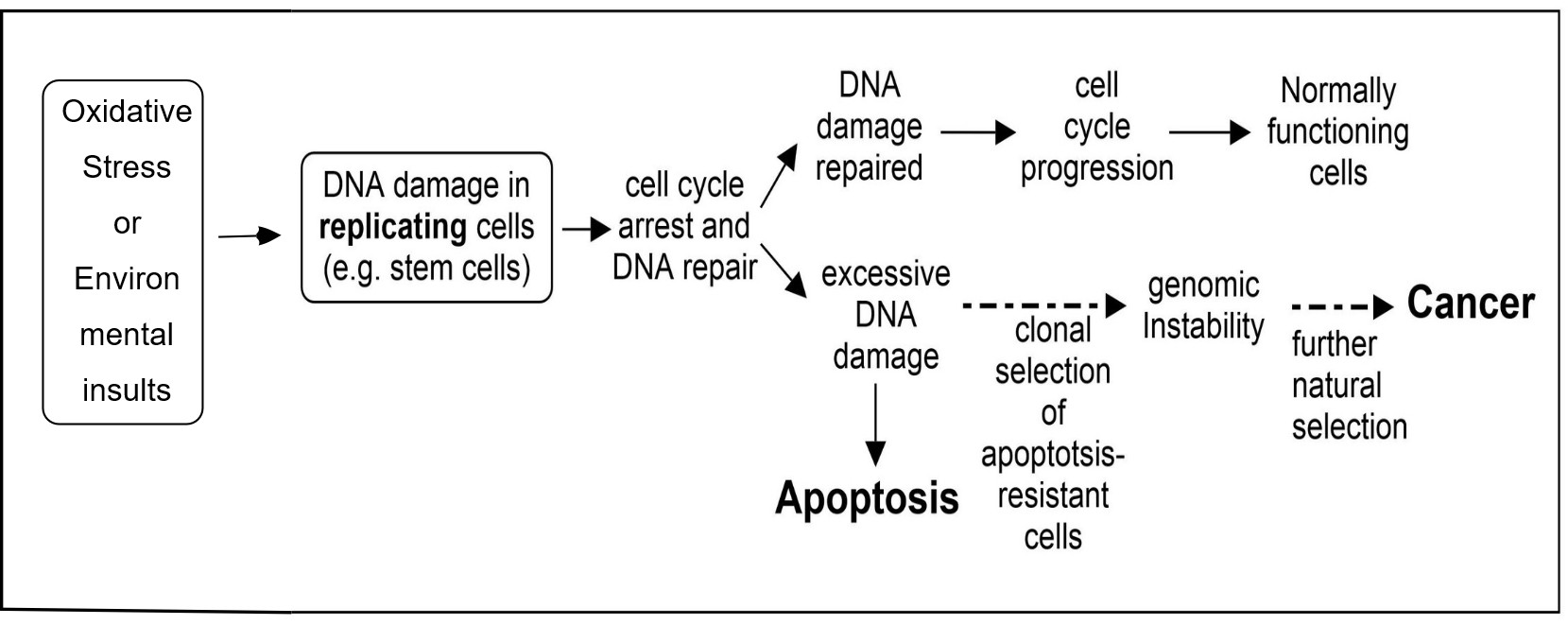
Oxidative stress or environmental insults can lead to DNA damage in replicating cells and this can result in apoptosis or cancer.

Repair of DNA damages and apoptosis are two enzymatic processes essential for maintaining genome integrity in humans. Cells that are deficient in DNA repair tend to accumulate DNA damages, and when such cells are also defective in apoptosis they tend to survive even with excess DNA damage. Replication of DNA in such cells leads to mutations and these mutations may cause cancer (see Figure). Several enzymatic pathways have evolved for repairing different kinds of DNA damage, and it has been found that in five well studied DNA repair pathways particular enzymes have a dual role, where one role is to participate in repair of a specific class of damages and the second role is to induce apoptosis if the level of such DNA damage is beyond the cell's repair capability. These dual role proteins tend to protect against development of cancer. Proteins that function in such a dual role for each repair process are: (1) DNA mismatch repair, MSH2, MSH6, MLH1 and PMS2; (2) base excision repair, APEX1 (REF1/APE), poly(ADP-ribose) polymerase (PARP); (3) nucleotide excision repair, XPB, XPD (ERCC2), p53, p33(ING1b); (4) non-homologous end joining, the catalytic subunit of DNA-PK; (5) homologous recombinational repair, BRCA1, ATM, ATR, WRN, BLM, Tip60, p53.

== Clinical significance ==
=== ABL ===
The BCR-ABL oncogene has been found to be involved in the development of cancer in humans.

=== c-Myc ===
c-Myc is involved in the regulation of apoptosis via its role in downregulating the Bcl-2 gene. Its role the disordered growth of tissue.

=== Metastasis ===
A molecular characteristic of metastatic cells is their altered expression of several apoptotic genes.

== See also ==
- Anoikis
- Apoptosis-inducing factor
- Apoptosis versus Pseudoapoptosis
- Apoptosome
- Apoptotic DNA fragmentation
- Autolysis (biology)
- Autophagy
- Autoschizis
- Bcl-2
- BH3 interacting domain death agonist (BID)
- Calpains
- Caspases
- Cell damage
- Cornification
- Cytochrome c
- Cytotoxicity
- Diablo homolog
- Entosis
- Excitotoxicity
- Ferroptosis
- Inflammasome
- Mitochondrial permeability transition pore
- Mitotic catastrophe
- Necrobiology
- Necroptosis
- Necrosis
- p53 upregulated modulator of apoptosis (PUMA)
- Paraptosis
- Parthanatos
- Pyroptosis
- RIP kinases
- Wallerian degeneration
