= ATG8 =

Protein in budding yeast

autophagy related protein 8
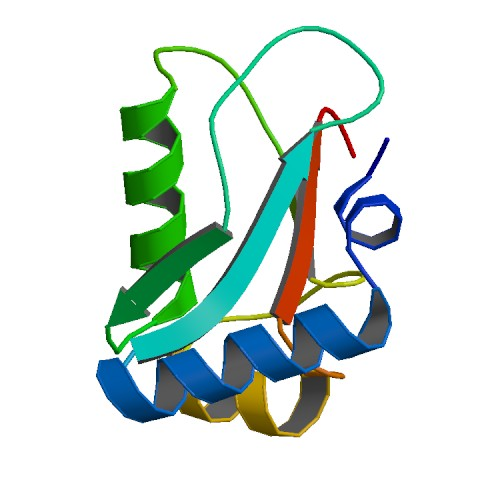
- The crystal structure of microtubule-associated protein light chain 3, a mammalian homologue of Saccharomyces cerevisiae Atg8.

Identifiers
- Organism: S. cerevisiae strain S288c (Baker's yeast)
- Symbol: Atg8
- Alt. symbols: Apg8, Aut7, Cvt5
- Entrez: 852200
- Orthologs: NCBI: entry; OMA: entry
- RefSeq (mRNA): NM_001178318
- RefSeq (Prot): NP_009475
- UniProt: P38182

Other data
- Chromosome: VII: 0.16 - 0.16 Mb
Search for
- Structures: Swiss-model
- Domains: InterPro

Autophagy-related protein 8 (Atg8) is a ubiquitin-like protein required for the formation of autophagosomal membranes. The transient conjugation of Atg8 to the autophagosomal membrane through a ubiquitin-like conjugation system is essential for autophagy in eukaryotes. Even though there are homologues in animals (see for example GABARAP, GABARAPL1, GABARAPL2, MAP1LC3A, MAP1LC3B, MAP1LC3B2, and MAP1LC3C), this article mainly focuses on its role in lower eukaryotes such as Saccharomyces cerevisiae.

== Structure ==
Atg8 is a monomer of 117 aminoacids and a molecular weight of 13,6kDa. It consists of a 5-stranded β-sheet, which is enclosed by two α-helices at one side and one α-helix at the other side and exhibits a conserved GABARAP domain. Even though Atg8 does not show a clear sequence homology to ubiquitin, its crystal structure reveals a conserved ubiquitin-like fold.

== Function ==
=== In autophagy ===
Atg8 is one of the key molecular components involved in autophagy, the cellular process mediating the lysosome/vacuole-dependent turnover of macromolecules and organelles. Autophagy is induced upon nutrient depletion or rapamycin treatment and leads to the response of more than 30 autophagy-related (ATG) genes known so far, including ATG8. How exactly ATG proteins are regulated is still under investigation, but it is clear that all signals reporting on the availability of carbon and nitrogen sources converge on the TOR signalling pathway and that ATG proteins are downstream effectors of this pathway. In case nutrient supplies are sufficient, the TOR signaling pathway hyperphosphorylates certain Atg proteins, thereby inhibiting autophagosome formation. After starvation autophagy is induced through the activation of Atg proteins both on the protein modification and the transcriptional level.

Atg8 is especially important in macroautophagy which is one of three distinct types of autophagy characterized by the formation of double-membrane enclosed vesicles that sequester portions of the cytosol, the so-called autophagosomes. The outer membrane of these autophagosomes subsequently fuses with the lysosome/vacuole to release an inter single membrane (autophagic body) destined for degradation. During this process, Atg8 is particularly crucial for autophagosome maturation (lipidation).

Like most Atg proteins, Atg8 is localized in the cytoplasm and at the PAS under nutrient-rich conditions, but becomes membrane-associated in case of autophagy induction. It then localizes to the site of autophagosome nucleation, the phagophore-assembly site (PAS). Nucleation of the phagophore requires the accumulation of a set of Atg proteins and of class III phosphoinositide 3-kinase complexes on the PAS. The subsequent recruitment of Atg8 and other autophagy-related proteins is believed to trigger vesicle expansion in a concerted manner, presumably by providing the driving force for membrane curvature. The transient conjugation of Atg8 to the membrane lipid phosphatidylethanolamine is essential for phagophore expansion as its mutation leads to defects in autophagosome formation. It is distributed symmetrically on both sides of the autophagosome and it is assumed that there is a quantitative correlation between the amount of Atg8 and the vesicle size.

After finishing vesicle expansion, the autophagosome is ready for fusion with the lysosome and Atg8 can either be released from the membrane for recycling (see below) or gets degraded in the autolysosome if left uncleaved.

ATG8 is also required for a different autophagy-related process called the cytoplasm-to-vacuole targeting (Cvt) pathway. This yeast-specific process acts constitutively under nutrient-rich conditions and selectively transports hydrolases such as aminopeptidase I to the yeast vacuole. The Cvt pathway also requires Atg8 localised to the PAS for the formation of Cvt vesicles which then fuse with the vacuole to deliver hydrolases necessary for degradation.

=== Post-translational modification and regulatory cycle ===
Atg8 exists in a cytoplasmic and in a membrane-associated form. Membrane association is achieved by coupling Atg8 to phosphatidylethanolamine (PE) which is a lipid constituent of plasma membranes. This post-translational modification process, called lipidation, is performed by the Atg8 conjugation system comprising the cysteine protease ATG4 (belonging to the caspase family), as well as the proteins ATG7, ATG3 and the ATG5-ATG12 complex.

The Atg8 conjugation system works in analogy to the ubiquitination system. However, it is Atg8 itself that represents the ubiquitin-like protein (Ubl) being transferred to PE, while ATG7 functions like an E1 enzyme, ATG3 like an E2 enzyme and the ATG12-ATG5 complex like an E3 ligase.

The lipidation process is initiated by an ATG4-dependent post-translational cleavage of the last C-terminal amino acid residue of Atg8. After the cleavage, Atg8 exposes a C-terminal glycine residue (Gly 116) to which PE can then be coupled during the following steps. In the first step, the Gly116 residue of Atg8 binds to a cysteine residue of ATG7 via a thioester bond in an ATP-dependent manner. During the second step, Atg8 is transferred to Atg3 assuming the same type of thioester bond. Finally, Atg8 is detached from Atg3 and coupled to the amine head group of PE via an amide bond. This final step was found to be facilitated and stimulated by the ATG5-ATG12 complex.

Both proteins, Atg5 and Atg12 were originally identified as part of another Ubl conjugating system that promotes conjugation of ATG12 to ATG5 via ATG7 and Atg10. This implies, that the ATG12 and the Atg8 conjugation system are actually interdependent.

== Mammalian homologues ==
In higher eukaryotes Atg8 is not encoded by a single gene as in yeast, but derived from a multigene family. Four of its homologues have already been identified in mammalian cells.

One of them is LC3 (MAP1LC3A), a light chain of the microtubule-associated protein 1 Like Atg8, LC3 needs to be proteolytically cleaved and lipidated to be turned into its active form which can localize to the autophagosomal membrane. Similar to the situation in yeast, the activation process of LC3 is triggered by nutrient depletion, as well as in response to hormones.

Mammalian LC3 isoforms contain a conserved Ser/Thr12, which is phosphorylated by protein kinase A to suppress participation in autophagy/mitophagy.

Other homologues are the transport factor GATE-16 (Golgi-associated ATPase enhancer of 16 kDa) which plays an important role in intra-golgi vesicular transport by stimulating NSF (N-ethylmaleimide-sensitive factor) ATPase activity and interacting with the Golgi v-SNARE GOS-28, and GABARAP (γ-aminobutyric acid type A receptor associated protein) which facilitates clustering of GABAA receptors in combination with microtubules.

All three proteins are characterized by proteolytic activation processes upon which they get lipidated and localized to the plasma membrane. However, for GATE-16 and GABARAP membrane association seems to be possible even for the non-lipidated forms. Apart from LC3, GABARAP and GATE-16 the most recently but less well characterized mammalian homologue is ATGL8. Little is known about its actual activation process except for its interaction with one of the mammalian ATG4 homologues, hATG4A.

== See also ==
- autophagy
- autophagin
- ATG5
- ATG7
- ATG12
- MAP1LC3A
- GABARAP
