= WDFY3 =

Identifiers
- Aliases: WDFY3, ALFY, ZFYVE25, WD repeat and FYVE domain containing 3, BCHS, MCPH18
- External IDs: OMIM: 617485; MGI: 1096875; GeneCards: WDFY3
Available structures
| PDB | Ortholog search: PDBe RCSB |
| PDB | List of PDB id codes 3WIM |

Gene location (Human)
| Chr. | Chromosome 4 (human) |
| Band | 4q21.23 | Start | 84,669,597 bp |
| Band | 4q21.23 | End | 84,966,690 bp |

Gene location (Mouse)
| Chr. | Chromosome 5 (mouse) |
| Band | 5 E5|5 48.95 cM | Start | 101,980,822 bp |
| Band | 5 E5|5 48.95 cM | End | 102,217,787 bp |
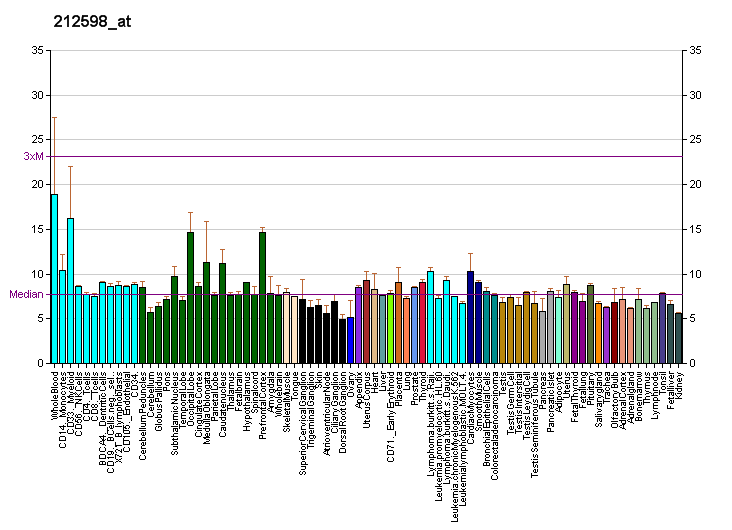

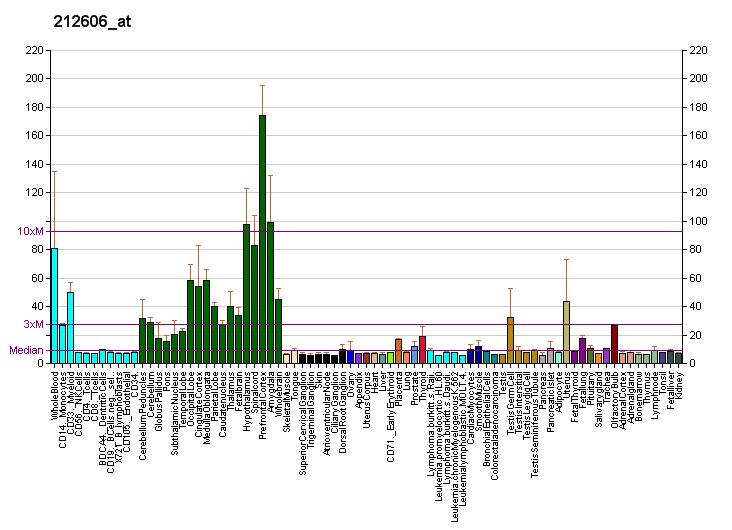

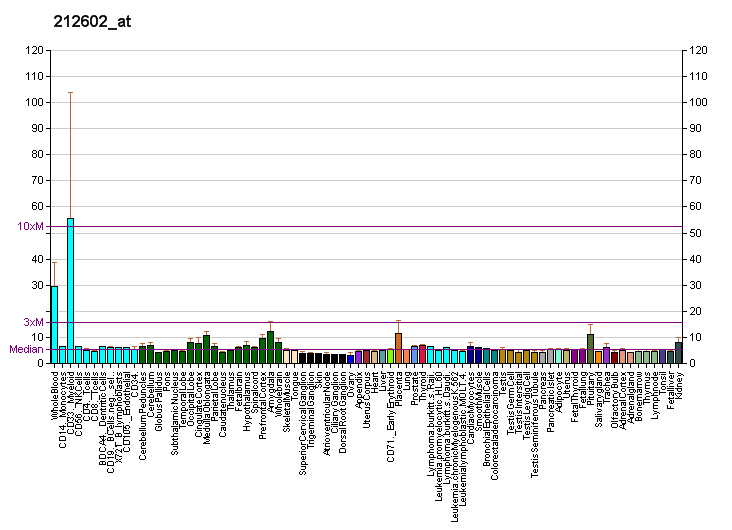
RNA expression pattern
| Bgee | Human / Mouse (ortholog); Top expressed in: sural nerve; Achilles tendon; corpus callosum; inferior olivary nucleus; dorsal motor nucleus of vagus nerve; ventricular zone; internal globus pallidus; ganglionic eminence; epithelium of colon; optic nerve / Top expressed in: mammillary body; lateral hypothalamus; lateral septal nucleus; lobe of cerebellum; lateral geniculate nucleus; cerebellar vermis; dorsal tegmental nucleus; ventromedial nucleus; paraventricular nucleus of hypothalamus; medial dorsal nucleus; More reference expression data |
| BioGPS | More reference expression data |
Gene ontology
| Molecular function | protein binding; 1-phosphatidylinositol binding; beta-N-acetylglucosaminylglycopeptide beta-1,4-galactosyltransferase activity; metal ion binding; lipid binding |
| Cellular component | Atg12-Atg5-Atg16 complex; PML body; nuclear membrane; nuclear envelope; extrinsic component of membrane; extrinsic component of autophagosome membrane; autophagosome; cytoplasm; inclusion body; membrane; nucleus; nucleolus; plasma membrane; cytosol; axon; cell projection; perikaryon |
| Biological process | aggrephagy; autophagy; multicellular organism development |
Sources:Amigo / QuickGO
Orthologs
| Databases | NCBI: entry; OMA: entry |
| Species | Human | Mouse |
| Entrez | 23001 | 72145 |
| Ensembl | ENSG00000163625 | ENSMUSG00000043940 |
| UniProt | Q8IZQ1 | Q6VNB8 |
| RefSeq (mRNA) | NM_014991; NM_178583; NM_178585 | NM_172882; NM_028124 |
| RefSeq (protein) | NP_055806 | NP_766470 |
| Location (UCSC) | Chr 4: 84.67 – 84.97 Mb | Chr 5: 101.98 – 102.22 Mb |
| PubMed search |
- Wikidata
| View/Edit Human | View/Edit Mouse |

WD repeat and FYVE domain-containing protein 3 (WDFY3), also known as Autophagy-linked FYVE protein (ALFY), is a large protein encoded by the WDFY3 gene located on human chromosome 4.

== Structure ==
WDFY3 encodes a protein with a N-terminal PH-BEACH domain, 5 WD40 repeats and a C-terminal FYVE domain. Multiple alternatively spliced transcript variants have been found for this gene, but the full-length nature of some variants has not been defined.

== Biochemistry and function ==
=== Localization ===
The C-terminal FYVE domain binds phosphatidylinositol-3-phosphate, a nuclear membrane lipid, localizing WDFY3 to the nuclear membrane under normal conditions.

A unique glutamic acid with the FYVE domain reduces membrane binding affinity, allowing WDFY3 to more easily enter the cytosol.

=== Autophagy ===
WDFY3 is recruited from the nuclear membrane to cytoplasmic ubiquitin-rich protein aggregates marked by SQSTM1.

It connects these aggregates to macroautophagic proteins such as Atg5, Atg12, Atg16L, and LC3.

LC3 is specifically bound by a LC3-interacting region (LCI) within the WD40 repeat domain of WDFY3.

not necessary for starvation-induced autophagy

=== Neural development pathways ===
Establishing neuronal connectivity

directional cell migration

=== Interaction with neurodegenerative disease pathways ===
In vitro ALS pathway modification

Huntington's Disease Pathogenesis Is Modified In Vivo by Alfy/Wdfy3 and Selective Macroautophagy

PD-like proteome and histology with age

== Clinical ==
Mutations in WDFY3 have been associated with neurodevelopmental delay, intellectual disability, macrocephaly, microcephaly, and neurodevelopmental conditions such as autism spectrum disorder (ASD) and attention deficit hyperactivity disorder (ADHD).

== Homology ==
Drosphila: bchs
