= MAP1 =

MAP1 may refer to:

- MAP1A
- MAP1B
