= ATG16L1 =

Protein found in humans

Identifiers
- Aliases: ATG16L1, autophagy related 16-like 1 (S. cerevisiae), APG16L, ATG16A, ATG16L, IBD10, WDR30, autophagy related 16 like 1
- External IDs: OMIM: 610767; MGI: 1924290; GeneCards: ATG16L1
Available structures
PDB	Ortholog search: PDBe RCSB
PDB	List of PDB id codes 4GDK, 4GDL, 4NAW, 4TQ0, 5D7G

Gene location (Human)
Chr.	Chromosome 2 (human)
Band	2q37.1	Start	233,210,051 bp
Band	2q37.1	End	233,295,674 bp

Gene location (Mouse)
Chr.	Chromosome 1 (mouse)
Band	1|1 D	Start	87,683,592 bp
Band	1|1 D	End	87,720,150 bp
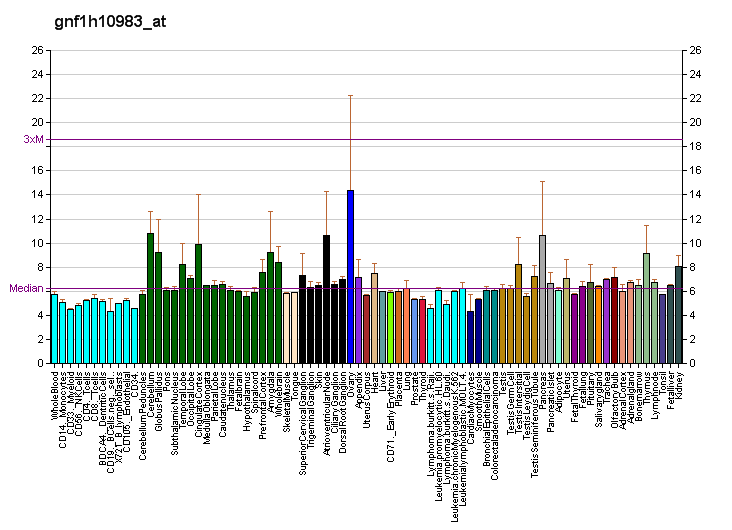

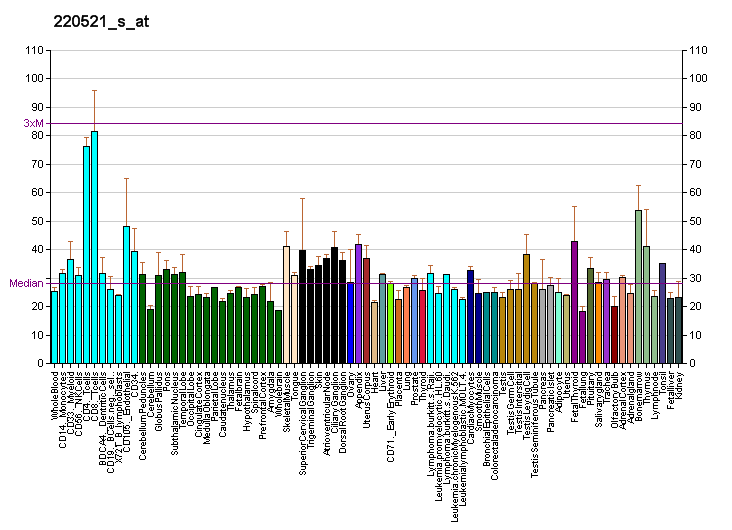

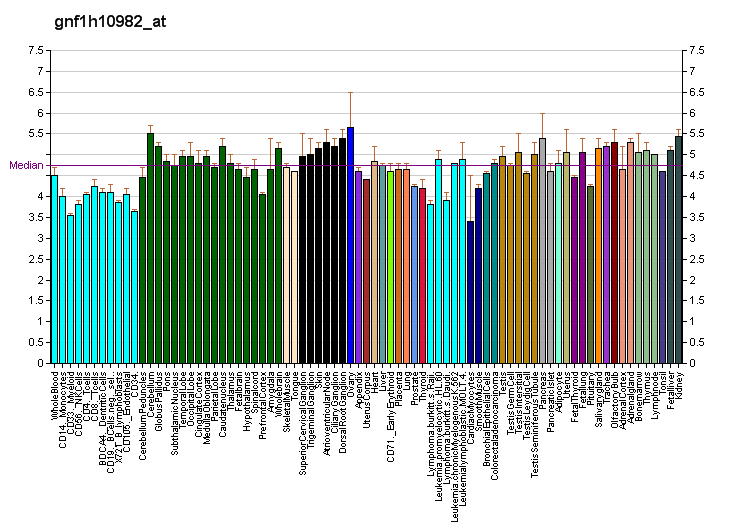
RNA expression pattern
Bgee	Human / Mouse (ortholog); Top expressed in: right hemisphere of cerebellum; testicle; gonad; granulocyte; right frontal lobe; right lobe of thyroid gland; left lobe of thyroid gland; skin of leg; gastrocnemius muscle; skin of abdomen / Top expressed in: neural layer of retina; secondary oocyte; primary oocyte; granulocyte; motor neuron; superior frontal gyrus; primary visual cortex; right ventricle; transitional epithelium of urinary bladder; dentate gyrus of hippocampal formation granule cell; More reference expression data
BioGPS	More reference expression data
Gene ontology
Molecular function	ubiquitin-like protein transferase activity; protein binding; identical protein binding; GTPase binding
Cellular component	cytoplasm; autophagosome; axoneme; cytosol; phagophore assembly site membrane; autophagosome membrane; membrane
Biological process	protein transport; autophagy; negative stranded viral RNA replication; protein homooligomerization; macroautophagy; autophagosome assembly; protein localization to phagophore assembly site; protein lipidation involved in autophagosome assembly; xenophagy; positive regulation of autophagy
Sources:Amigo / QuickGO
Orthologs
Databases	NCBI: entry; OMA: entry
Species	Human	Mouse
Entrez	55054	77040
Ensembl	ENSG00000281089; ENSG00000085978	ENSMUSG00000026289
UniProt	Q676U5	Q8C0J2
RefSeq (mRNA)	NM_001190266; NM_001190267; NM_017974; NM_030803; NM_198890 NM_001363742	NM_001205391; NM_001205392; NM_029846
RefSeq (protein)	NP_001177195; NP_001177196; NP_060444; NP_110430; NP_942593 NP_001350671; NP_060444.3	NP_001192320; NP_001192321; NP_084122
Location (UCSC)	Chr 2: 233.21 – 233.3 Mb	Chr 1: 87.68 – 87.72 Mb
PubMed search
- Wikidata
View/Edit Human	View/Edit Mouse

Autophagy related 16 like 1 (ATG16L1) is a scaffolding protein required for autophagosome formation. ATG16L1 forms a protein complex with the autophagy-related ATG12-ATG5/ATG16 proteins, forming the ATG12-ATG5-ATG16L1 complex. This complex then facilitates LC3 (ATG8) lipidation and autophagosome formation.

ATG16L1 is also reported to have autophagy-independent functions such as, intracellular membrane trafficking regulation and inflammation.

== Function ==
Autophagy is the major intracellular degradation system delivering cytoplasmic components to lysosomes, and it accounts for degradation of most long-lived proteins and some organelles. Cytoplasmic constituents, including organelles, are sequestered into double-membraned autophagosomes, which subsequently fuse with lysosomes. ATG16L1 is a component of a large protein complex essential for autophagy. Several proteins which interact with ATG16L have been identified to reveal its function. It appears that ATGL16L has an important role not only in autophagy but also in xenophagy for example during a bacterial infection, in antigen presentation in human B cells, plasma membrane repair in mouse embryonic fibroblasts, hormone secretion and in alcohol-induced sedation response in Drosophila.

== Structure ==
ATG16L1 protein consists of three main domains: N-terminal region which contains an alpha-helix required for binding to ATG5 ubiquitin-folds, a middle region (coiled-coil domain, CCD), and a domain made of seven WD40 repeats, that forms a β-propeller, found in its C-terminal part. Polymorphisms and mutations in these domains are considered to be associated with several diseases.

Due to present models, ATG16L1 is supposed to exist in ~800 kDa complexes which contain ATG12-ATG5 and several ATG16L1 dimers. These dimers are composed mostly of a CCD region of the protein and ATG5 binding site. The middle region is considered to be essential for the ATG16L1 function. Mice with CCD deletions exhibited phenotypic abnormalities as well as neonatal fatality, though non of these were observed in WD40 region deletion phenotype. Surprisingly, overexpression of CCD, as well as deletion, leads to an inhibition of autophagosome formation.

== Clinical significance ==
ATG16L1 is expressed in the colon, intestinal cells, leukocytes and spleen. Recent studies have shown that mutations in the ATG16L1 gene may be linked to Crohn's disease. A coding polymorphism in ATG16L1 gene is considered to be a risk factor for Crohn's disease development as well as ATG16L2. ATG16L1 appears to be an essential protein for the function of intestinal stem cells, morphological structure of intestinal cells and granule exocytosis pathway of the Paneth cells in animal models.

Bacteria invasion leads to ATG16L1 recruiting by NOD1 and NOD2. This results in autophagy in RIP2/NF-κB independent manner. It is also known that NOD2 interacts with ATG16L, ATG5 and ATG7 and provides antibacterial immune response through autophagy induction and MHC class II antigen-specific CD4+ T cell responses. It has also been shown that low levels of ATG16L1 result in lower ATG16L1-NOD2 complex formation, which is crucial for bacterial autophagy in the bacterial entry site. Inhibition of autophagy leads to a NOD2 signaling through RIP2 kinase and induction of cytokine responses. This promotes an increase in mRNA expression of highly potent pro-inflammatory cytokines as interkleukin-1 (IL-1β).

ATG16L1 also plays a role in viral infections. Through autophagy viral particles are delivered into the lysosome degradation pathway and interrogate with a specific type of pattern recognition receptor to initiate type I interferon (IFN-I) expression and viral clearance. Interestingly, ATG5-ATG12/ATG16L1 complex negatively regulates RIG-I-like receptor pathway and IFN-I expression. A mouse with a deletion in one of these genes appears to be resistant to virus replication. It is most likely due to an unregulated overexpression of IFN-I, which interferes with the virus life cycle.

ATG16L2 is a related protein, which is also highly conserved (both ATG16L1 and 2 share 94 and 83% sequence identity). It has been shown that changes in ATG16L2 expression are correlated with Multiple Sclerosis (MS) and can be used as a serum biomarker of the disease and specifically for the prediction of relapse rates. Interestingly ATG16L2 mRNA expression was significantly reduced (~4-fold lower) in T cells isolated from the peripheral blood of MS patients in comparison to healthy age-matched controls, which may reflect their abnormal activation.
