= NBEAL1 =

Protein-coding gene in the species Homo sapiens

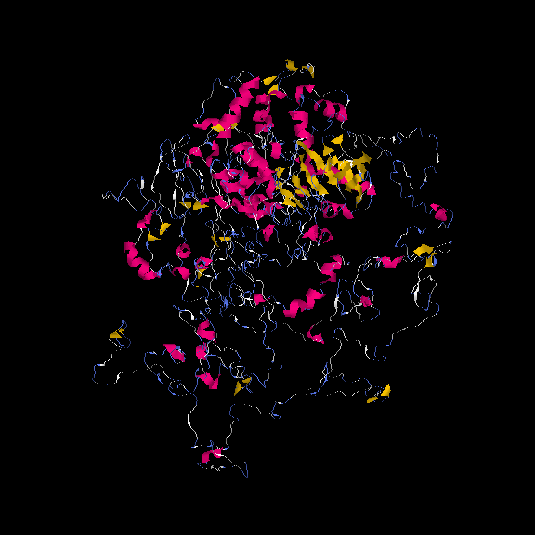

Identifiers
- Aliases: NBEAL1, A530083I02Rik, ALS2CR16, ALS2CR17, neurobeachin like 1
- External IDs: OMIM: 609816; MGI: 2444343; GeneCards: NBEAL1

Gene location (Human)
Chr.	Chromosome 2 (human)
Band	2q33.2	Start	203,014,608 bp
Band	2q33.2	End	203,226,378 bp

Gene location (Mouse)
Chr.	Chromosome 1 (mouse)
Band	1|1 C2	Start	60,219,758 bp
Band	1|1 C2	End	60,377,487 bp
RNA expression pattern
Bgee	Human / Mouse (ortholog); Top expressed in: epithelium of colon; Achilles tendon; tail of epididymis; jejunal mucosa; pylorus; bone marrow cell; caput epididymis; corpus epididymis; saphenous vein; cardia / Top expressed in: otolith organ; utricle; transitional epithelium of urinary bladder; epithelium of stomach; ciliary body; retinal pigment epithelium; iris; vestibular membrane of cochlear duct; hand; right lung lobe; More reference expression data
BioGPS	n/a
Orthologs
Databases	NCBI: entry; OMA: entry
Species	Human	Mouse
Entrez	65065	269198
Ensembl	ENSG00000144426	ENSMUSG00000073664
UniProt	Q6ZS30	n/a
RefSeq (mRNA)	NM_001099273; NM_001114132; NM_198945; NM_205543; NM_001378026	NM_173444
RefSeq (protein)	NP_001107604; NP_001364955	n/a
Location (UCSC)	Chr 2: 203.01 – 203.23 Mb	Chr 1: 60.22 – 60.38 Mb
PubMed search
- Wikidata
View/Edit Human	View/Edit Mouse

Neurobeachin-like protein 1 is a protein that in humans is encoded by the NBEAL1 gene.

Through the different domains of this protein, the function of NBEAL1 is predicted to be involved in the following cellular mechanisms: vesicle trafficking, membrane dynamics, receptor signaling, pre-mRNA processing, signal transduction and cytoskeleton assembly. NBEAL1 is also known as Amytorophic Lateral Sclerosis 2 Chromosomal Region, ALS2CR16 and ALS2CR17.

== Protein Properties ==
=== Transcript ===
The mRNA for this protein consists of 9058 base pairs in a linear sequence with the coding sequence begins at base pair number 334 and extends until base pair number 8418. The translated protein is a total 56 exons that constitute a final length of 2694 amino acids. There are currently 9 known isoforms within humans.

==== Domains ====
Neurobeachin-like1 contains five domains: DUF4704, DUF4800, PH_BEACH, Beach, and WD40 repeats.

===== DUF4704 =====
DUF4704 is a domain of unknown function. While the function of this domain is unknown, it is conserved within neurobeachin proteins in eukaryotes. It begins at amino acid 859 and spans until number 1115.

===== DUF4800 =====
DUF4800 is a domain of unknown function. It begins at amino acid 1580, spanning until 1833. While it is uncharacterized in function, it is found within eukaryotes.

===== PH_BEACH =====
Spanning from amino acid 1886 until amino acid 1983, this domain is referred to as a Pleckstrin Homology domain in the BEACH domain. It has a PH because the fold of this domain is similar to the PH domain, but is not identical in the sequence of the canonical PH domains. The PH_BEACH domain is not able to bind phospholipids.

===== Beach =====
The Beige and Chediak-Higashi (BEACH) domain is one of the most significant domains within this protein. This domain is highly conserved roughly 280 amino acid domain, present in nine different human BEACH domains. It located after the PH_BEACH domain in the sequence. While not much is understood on the exact function of BDCP proteins within the BEACH domain, it is known that they serve many purposes within cellular mechanisms: vesicular transport, apoptosis, membrane dynamics and receptor signaling. This protein family is of great clinical importance currently because mutations in this domain have been identified in multiple human disorders. For example, neurobeachin-like1 is upregulated in glioma: as the pathological grade of the glioma increases, the expression of neurobeachin-like1 is decreased. In NBEAL1, this follows the PH_BEACH domain, beginning at amino acid 2005 and ending at amino acid 2284.

===== WD40 =====
NBEAL1 has one WD40 domain within NBEAL1. From amino acid 2409 to 2682 is the entire WD40 domain. Within the domain, from 2406 to 2439, there is a structural motif WD40 repeat. The WD40 domain is found in a number of eukaryotic proteins that have multiple functions. These include, but are not limited to, adaptor/regulatory modules in signal transduction, pre-mRNA processing, and cytoskeleton assembly.

=== Properties ===
- Molecular weight of 307.3 kilodaltons
- Predicted to be localized to the mitochondria

== Structure ==
=== Secondary ===
The secondary structure of NBEAL1 is predicted to be a combination of alpha helices, beta sheets and random coils.

=== Tertiary ===
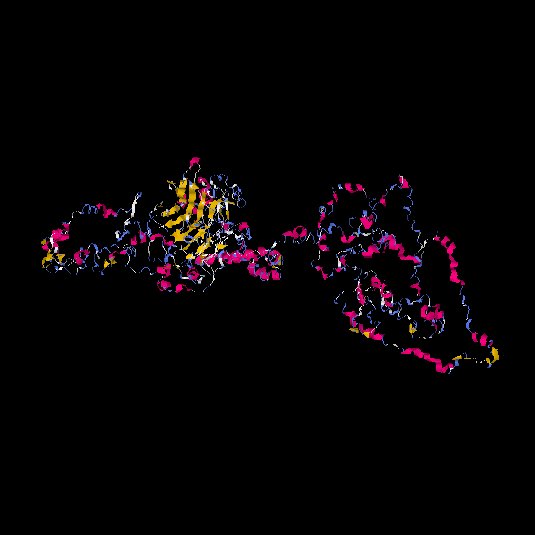
I-TASSER predicted this 3D structure for amino acids 1-1500 of NBEAL1.

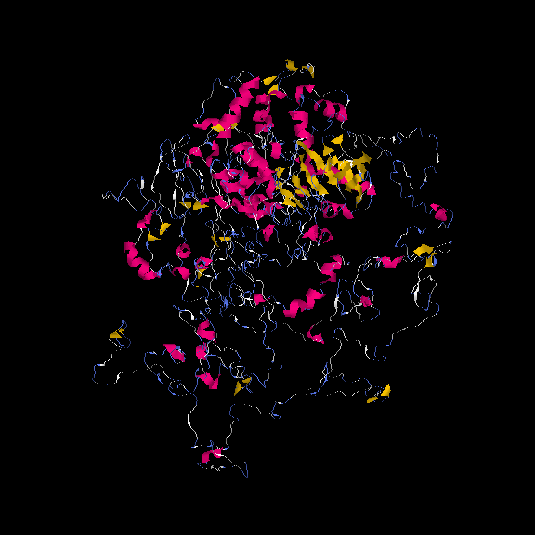
Predicted structure via I-TASSER of NBEAL1, amino acids 1501-2694.

I-TASSER was used to predict a 3D structure of NBEAL1. Since NBEAL1 is longer in amino acid length than allowed for input, it was split in half to predict the structure of the whole protein.

=== Post-Translational Modifications ===
The following document illustrates the different post-translational modifications.

The different post-translational modifications are illustrated in this conceptually annotated transcript.

== Expression ==
Using the EST abundance profile through Unigene, NBEAL1 expression was discovered based on both body sites and health states. NBEAL1 shows expression in the brain, embryonic tissue, eye, intestine, kidney, liver, lung, mammary glands, ovaries, pancreas, pharynx, placenta, prostate, skin, stomach, testis, thyroid, and trachea. Based on transcripts per million, expression is highest in the stomach at 62 transcripts per million, with pancreas and trachea being next with their transcripts per million being 37 and 38, respectively. The lowest transcripts per million in the brain, eye, placenta and testis, all at 4 per million. When looking at the breakdown by different health states, NBEAL1 is highly expressed in multiple tumors. Again, the abundance was highest in gastrointestinal tumors, correlating to the high expression of NBEAL1 within the stomach. However, NBEAL1 expression is not seen in pancreatic tumors, which may signify something about its function within the pancreas. The abundance also differs in developmental stages, the highest being the fetal stage with 21 transcripts per million and the adult at 14 transcripts per million.

== Function ==
The function of NBEAL1 is not yet well understood by the scientific community. However, given the function of the different domains and disease associations, it is predicted that the NBEAL1 protein may be involved in a variety of functions. As of now they include, but are not limited to, protein-protein interactions, vesicle trafficking, membrane dynamics, receptor signaling, apoptosis, adaptor/regulatory modules in signal transduction, pre-mRNA processing, and cytoskeleton assembly.

== Clinical Significance ==
This protein has been associated with NBEAL1 are Amyotrophic Lateral Sclerosis, Juvenile and Adenocarcinoma, although the function in these diseases has not yet been identified.

== Homology ==
Neurobeachin-like1 is a highly conserved protein. It has orthologs found in many life forms, including but not limited to: reptiles, birds, amphibians, mammals, fish, and a few invertebrates. The following table presents some of the orthologs found using searches in BLAST and BLAT.

Scientific name	Common name	Accession number	Sequence length	Percent identity
Homo sapiens	Human	NP_001107604.1	2694	-
Pan troglodytes	Chimpanzee	XP_525997.3	2694	99
Gorilla gorilla gorilla	Western Lowland Gorilla	XP_018878299.1	2694	99
Mus musculus	Mouse	NP_77560	2688	98
Cerocebus tays	Sooty angabey	XP_011903312	2678	97
Canis lupus familiaris	Dog	XP_545603.3	2693	93
Ailuropoda melanoleuca	Giant Panda	XP_019655126.1	2693	93
Trichechus manatus latirostris	West Indian Manatee	XP_004378299	2682	93
Tursiops truncatus	Common Bottlenose Dolphin	XP_019794654.1	2682	92.7
Eptesicus cuscus	Big Brown Bat	XP_008144758.1	2722	92
Zonotrichia albicollis	White Throated Sparrow	XP_014120514.1	2707	80
Gallus gallus	Chicken	XP_004942730.1	2725	78.7
Python bivattatus	Burmese Python	XP_007422078.1	2687	79
Xenopus tropicalis	Western Clawed Frog	XP_012826463.1	2687	74
Callorhinchus milii	Australian Ghostshark	XP_007888887.1	2749	70.2
Danio rerio	Zebrafish	XP_009300392	2723	66.3
Octopus bimaculoides	California two-spot octopus	XP_014777916.1	2584	41.2
Daphnia magna	Planktonic crustacean	KZS03729	2734	34.4
Drosophila busckii	Fruit fly	XP_017842328.1	2722	34

This unrooted phylogenetic tree, produced by Biology Workbench, illustrates the evolution of NBEAL1.

=== Paralogs ===
According to GeneCards, NBEAL1 has a few paralogs: NBEAL2, WDFY3, NBEA, LRBA, Lysosomal trafficking regulator (LYST), and WDFY3. The table below summarizes the paralogs of NBEAL1.

Gene Name	Species	Accession number	Sequence length	Percent identity
NBEAL2	Homo sapiens	NP_055990	2754	46
NBEA	Homo sapiens	NP_056483.3	2946	22.8
LRBA	Homo sapiens	NP_996717.2	2863	22.5
WDFY3	Homo sapiens	XP_016863397.1	3544	21.8
LYST	Homo sapiens	NP_001288294.1	3801	19.3

Using Biology Workbench, a Multiple Sequence Alignment was done to illustrate the highly conserved aspects of NBEAL1 in close orthologs to the homo sapiens gene.
