= MAP1LC3A =

Protein-coding gene in the species Homo sapiens

Identifiers
- Aliases: MAP1LC3A, ATG8E, LC3, LC3A, MAP1ALC3, MAP1BLC3, microtubule associated protein 1 light chain 3 alpha
- External IDs: OMIM: 601242; MGI: 1915661; GeneCards: MAP1LC3A
Available structures
PDB	Ortholog search: PDBe RCSB
PDB	List of PDB id codes 3ECI, 3WAL, 3WAN, 4ZDV

Gene location (Human)
Chr.	Chromosome 20 (human)
Band	20q11.22	Start	34,546,854 bp
Band	20q11.22	End	34,560,345 bp

Gene location (Mouse)
Chr.	Chromosome 2 (mouse)
Band	2|2 H1	Start	155,118,217 bp
Band	2|2 H1	End	155,119,993 bp
RNA expression pattern
Bgee	Human / Mouse (ortholog); Top expressed in: right hemisphere of cerebellum; right frontal lobe; Brodmann area 9; cingulate gyrus; anterior cingulate cortex; prefrontal cortex; hypothalamus; C1 segment; amygdala; anterior pituitary / Top expressed in: lip; muscle of thigh; right ventricle; dentate gyrus of hippocampal formation granule cell; superior frontal gyrus; primary visual cortex; seminiferous tubule; dorsomedial hypothalamic nucleus; digastric muscle; triceps brachii muscle; More reference expression data
BioGPS	n/a
Gene ontology
Molecular function	phosphatidylethanolamine binding; protein binding; phospholipid binding; ubiquitin protein ligase binding; microtubule binding
Cellular component	cytoplasm; organelle membrane; cytosol; late endosome; membrane; autophagosome; microtubule; cytoskeleton; cytoplasmic vesicle; endomembrane system; autolysosome; autophagosome membrane; synapse
Biological process	autophagy; autophagy of mitochondrion; autophagosome assembly; response to iron(II) ion; response to lead ion; response to nutrient levels; cellular response to amino acid starvation; response to morphine; cellular response to hydrogen peroxide; cellular response to copper ion; cellular response to nitrogen starvation; cellular response to starvation; macroautophagy; autophagosome maturation
Sources:Amigo / QuickGO
Orthologs
Databases	NCBI: entry; OMA: entry
Species	Human	Mouse
Entrez	84557	66734
Ensembl	ENSG00000101460	ENSMUSG00000027602
UniProt	Q9H492	Q91VR7
RefSeq (mRNA)	NM_032514; NM_181509	NM_025735
RefSeq (protein)	NP_115903; NP_852610	NP_080011
Location (UCSC)	Chr 20: 34.55 – 34.56 Mb	Chr 2: 155.12 – 155.12 Mb
PubMed search
- Wikidata
View/Edit Human	View/Edit Mouse

Microtubule-associated proteins 1A/1B light chain 3A is a protein that in humans is encoded by the MAP1LC3A gene. Two transcript variants encoding different isoforms have been found for this gene.

== Function ==
MAP1A and MAP1B are microtubule-associated proteins which mediate the physical interactions between microtubules and components of the cytoskeleton. MAP1A and MAP1B each consist of a heavy chain subunit and multiple light chain subunits. The protein encoded by this gene is one of the light chain subunits and can associate with either MAP1A or MAP1B.

MAPLC3A is one of the mammalian homologues of yeast ATG8, an important marker and effector of autophagy.

== Regulation ==
MAP1LC3A is regulated by several post-translational modifications. These include covalent linkage of the C-terminus to phosphatidylethanolamine in autophagic membranes, and phosphorylation by protein kinase A, which downregulates its autophagy functions. Noncovalent interactions are important for its cargo targeting functions in selective autophagy. For example, it has been shown to interact with sequestosome 1.
