= Autophagosome =

Cell biology structure

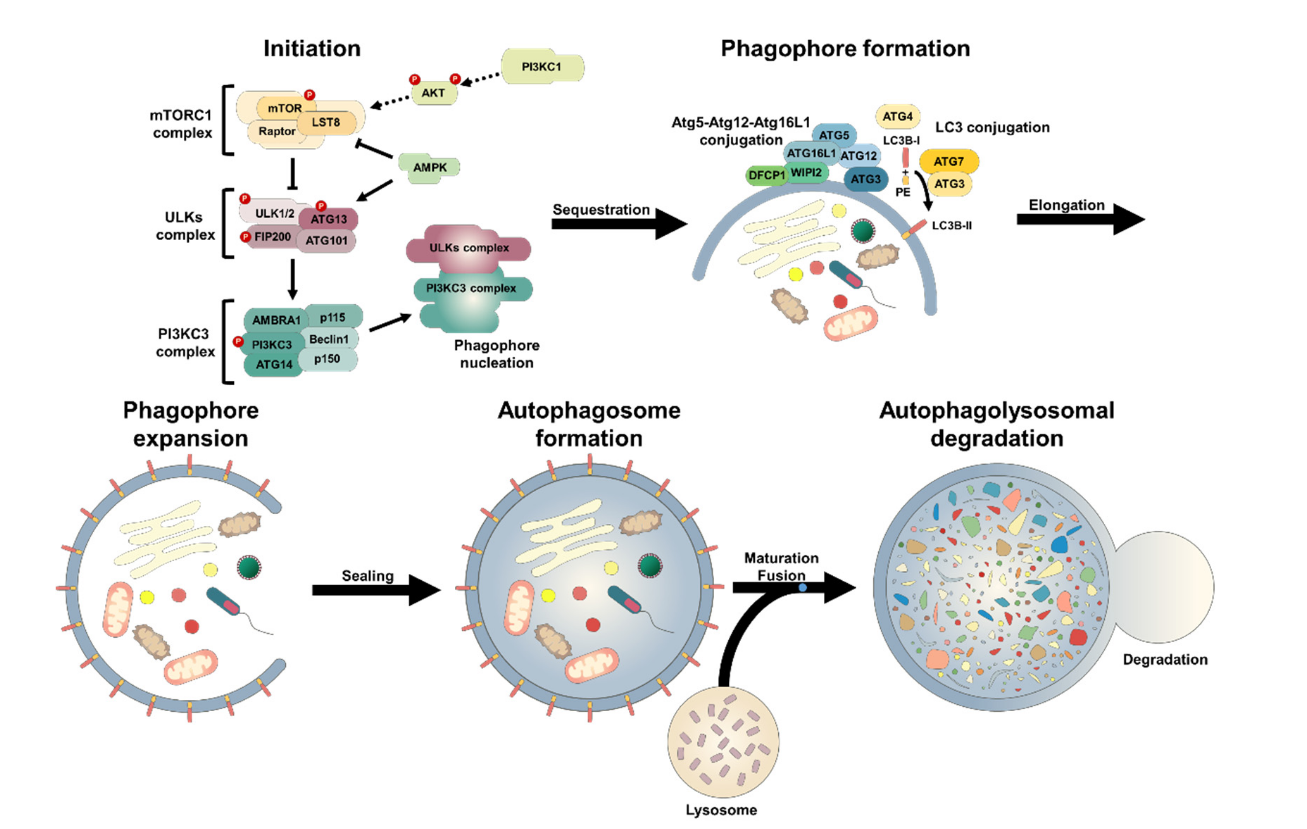
The autophagic process is divided into five distinct stages: Initiation, phagophore nucleation, autophagosomal formation (elongation), autophagosome-lysosome fusion (autophagolysosome) and cargo degradation.

An autophagosome is a spherical structure with double layer membranes. It is the key structure in macroautophagy, the intracellular degradation system for cytoplasmic contents (e.g., abnormal intracellular proteins, excess or damaged organelles, invading microorganisms). After formation, autophagosomes deliver cytoplasmic components to the lysosomes. The outer membrane of an autophagosome fuses with a lysosome to form an autolysosome. The lysosome's hydrolases degrade the autophagosome-delivered contents and its inner membrane.

The formation of autophagosomes is regulated by genes that are well-conserved from yeast to higher eukaryotes. The nomenclature of these genes has differed from paper to paper, but it has been simplified in recent years. The gene families formerly known as APG, AUT, CVT, GSA, PAZ, and PDD are now unified as the ATG (AuTophaGy related) family.

The size of autophagosomes varies between mammals and yeast. Yeast autophagosomes are about 500-900 nm, while mammalian autophagosomes are larger (500-1500 nm). In some examples of cells, like embryonic stem cells, embryonic fibroblasts, and hepatocytes, autophagosomes are visible with light microscopy and can be seen as ring-shaped structures.

== Autophagosome formation ==
Autophagosome formation is initiated by assembly and recruitment of the core autophagy machinery to distinct cellular sites, known as phagophore assembly sites (PAS) in yeast or autophagosome formation sites in other organisms. The process is tightly regulated by multiple autophagy-related (ATG) proteins.

The ULK1/ATG1 complex is the initial activator of autophagy in response to nutrient starvation, and it recruits other ATG proteins to the PAS. The class III phosphatidylinositol 3-kinase (PI3K) complex, including VPS34 and Beclin-1, produces phosphatidylinositol 3-phosphate (PI3P), which is essential for phagophore membrane dynamics. Membrane sources for phagophore expansion may include the endoplasmic reticulum, mitochondria, Golgi apparatus, and recycling endosomes.

After the formation of the spherical structure, ATG12-ATG5:ATG16L1 or E3-like complex (E3 for short) acts as a ubiquitin-like E3 enzyme, promoting LC3/GABARAP proteins anchoring to the AP membrane.

LC3 is cleaved by ATG4 protease to generate cytosolic LC3. The cleavage is required for the terminal fusion of an autophagosome with its target membrane. LC3 is cleaved and lipidated to form LC3-II, which associates with the autophagosomal membraneand is used as a marker of autophagosomes in immunocytochemistry, because it is the essential part of the vesicle and stays associated until the last moment before its fusion. At first, autophagosomes fuse with endosomes or endosome-derived vesicles and stays associated until the last moment before its fusion.

After the phagophore fully encloses its cargo, it seals and becomes a mature autophagosome. This structure then fuses with lysosomes to form an autolysosome, where the contents are degraded and recycled.

This process is similar in yeast, however the gene names differ. For example, LC3 in mammals is Atg8. In yeast autophagosomes are generated from Pre-Autophagosomal Structure (PAS) which is distinct from the precursor structures in mammalian cells. The pre-autophagosomal structure in yeast is described as a complex localized near the vacuole. However the significance of this localization is not known. Mature yeast autophagosomes fuse directly with vacuoles or lysosomes, and do not form amphisomes as in mammals. In yeast autophagosome maturation, there are also other known players such as Atg1, Atg13 and Atg17. Atg1 is a kinase upregulated upon induction of autophagy. Atg13 regulates Atg1 and together they form a complex called Atg13:Atg1, which receives signals from the master of nutrient sensing – Tor. Atg1 is also important in late stages of autophagosome formation.

== Function in neurons ==
In neurons, autophagosomes are generated at the neurite tip and mature (acidify) as they travel towards the cell body along the axon. This axonal transport is disrupted if huntingtin or its interacting partner HAP1, which colocalize with autophagosomes in neurons, are depleted.

== Clinical relevance ==
Autophagosomes serve as essential carriers in the autophagy pathway, enabling cells to adapt to metabolic stress and maintain homeostasis. They are responsible for the selective degradation of damaged organelles (for example, mitophagy (mitochondria), pexophagy (peroxisomes), aggrephagy (protein aggregates), glycophagy (glycogens), lipophagy (lipids), ribophagy (ribosome), xenophagy (pathogens), and ER-phagy).

This selective removal is crucial for cellular quality control, helping prevent the accumulation of toxic proteins and damaged components. Autophagy also plays roles in development, immunity, and cell differentiation. For instance, autophagosomes assist in antigen presentation, regulate inflammatory signaling, and contribute to the elimination of intracellular bacteria and viruses.

Defects in autophagosome function have been linked to several human diseases. In addition to neurodegenerative diseases such as Alzheimer's, Parkinson's, and Huntington's, impaired autophagy is associated with cancer, infectious diseases, and metabolic disorders like type 2 diabetes.

== See also ==
- Phagosome
