= Calpain-1 =

Enzyme

Identifiers
- EC no.: 3.4.22.52
- CAS no.: 78990-62-2

Databases
- IntEnz: IntEnz view
- BRENDA: BRENDA entry
- ExPASy: NiceZyme view
- KEGG: KEGG entry
- MetaCyc: metabolic pathway
- PRIAM: profile
- PDB structures: RCSB PDB PDBe PDBsum
Search
- PMC: articles
- PubMed: articles
- NCBI: proteins

Calpain-1 (EC 3.4.22.52, mu-calpain, calcium-activated neutral protease I) is an enzyme. This enzyme catalyses the following chemical reaction

Broad endopeptidase specificity

This enzyme belongs to the peptidase family C2.

== See also ==
- CAPN1
