= GABA type A receptor associated protein like 1 =

Protein-coding gene in the species Homo sapiens

GABARAPL1

Identifiers
- Aliases: GABARAPL1, APG8-LIKE, APG8L, ATG8, ATG8B, ATG8L, GEC1, GABA type A receptor associated protein like 1
- External IDs: OMIM: 607420; MGI: 1914980; GeneCards: GABARAPL1
Available structures
PDB	Ortholog search: PDBe RCSB
PDB	List of PDB id codes 2L8J, 2R2Q

Gene location (Human)
Chr.	Chromosome 12 (human)
Band	12p13.2	Start	10,212,458 bp
Band	12p13.2	End	10,223,128 bp

Gene location (Mouse)
Chr.	Chromosome 6 (mouse)
Band	6|6 F3	Start	129,510,123 bp
Band	6|6 F3	End	129,519,309 bp
RNA expression pattern
Bgee	Human / Mouse (ortholog); Top expressed in: Brodmann area 23; endothelial cell; middle temporal gyrus; pons; parotid gland; primary visual cortex; lateral nuclear group of thalamus; internal globus pallidus; superior frontal gyrus; kidney tubule / Top expressed in: hypothalamus; hippocampus proper; primary visual cortex; superior frontal gyrus; dentate gyrus of hippocampal formation granule cell; striatum of neuraxis; human kidney; olfactory bulb; cerebellar cortex; right kidney; More reference expression data
BioGPS	n/a
Gene ontology
Molecular function	GABA receptor binding; Tat protein binding; protein binding; beta-tubulin binding; ubiquitin protein ligase binding
Cellular component	cytoplasm; cell body; Golgi apparatus; membrane; intracellular anatomical structure; dendrite membrane; autophagosome; endoplasmic reticulum; mitochondrion; dendrite cytoplasm; microtubule; cytoskeleton; cytoplasmic vesicle membrane; cytoplasmic vesicle; autophagosome membrane; cytosol
Biological process	autophagy; macroautophagy; autophagosome maturation; autophagosome assembly; autophagy of mitochondrion; cellular response to nitrogen starvation
Sources:Amigo / QuickGO
Orthologs
Databases	NCBI: entry; OMA: entry
Species	Human	Mouse
Entrez	23710	57436
Ensembl	ENSG00000139112	ENSMUSG00000030161
UniProt	Q9H0R8	Q8R3R8
RefSeq (mRNA)	NM_031412; NM_001363598	NM_020590
RefSeq (protein)	NP_113600; NP_001350527	NP_065615
Location (UCSC)	Chr 12: 10.21 – 10.22 Mb	Chr 6: 129.51 – 129.52 Mb
PubMed search
- Wikidata
View/Edit Human	View/Edit Mouse

GABA type A receptor associated protein like 1 is a protein that in humans is encoded by the GABARAPL1 gene.
