= Cysteine protease ATG4A =

Protein-coding gene in humans

ATG4A
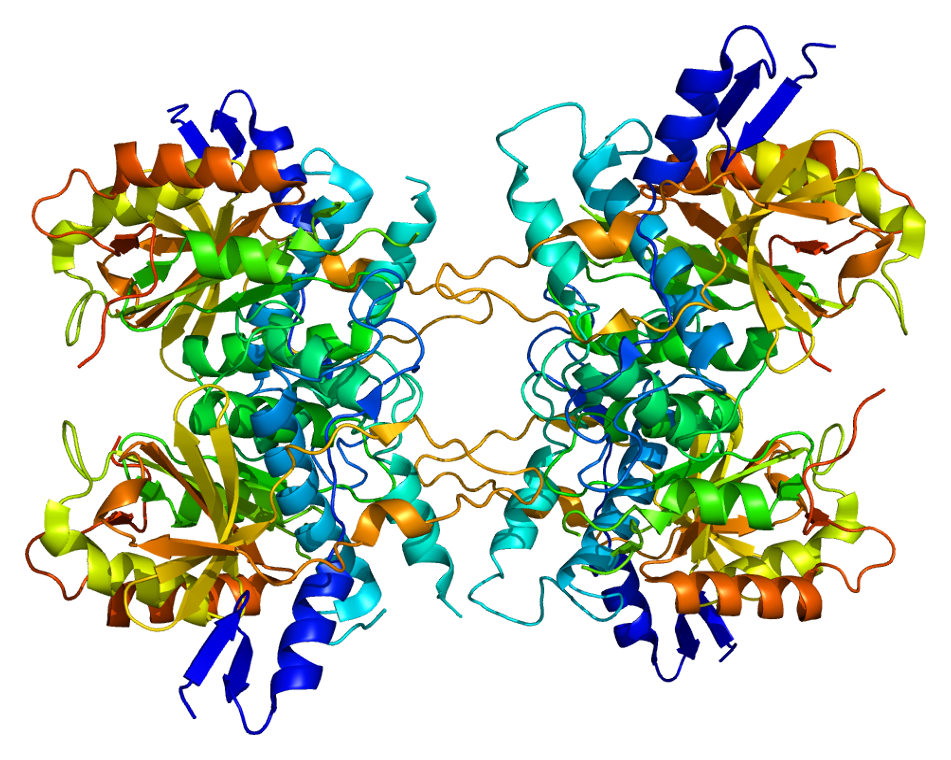

Identifiers
- Aliases: ATG4A, APG4A, AUTL2, autophagy related 4A cysteine peptidase, HsAPG4A
- External IDs: OMIM: 300663; MGI: 2147903; GeneCards: ATG4A
Available structures
PDB	Ortholog search: PDBe RCSB
PDB	List of PDB id codes 2P82

Gene location (Human)
Chr.	X chromosome (human)
Band	Xq22.3	Start	108,091,668 bp
Band	Xq22.3	End	108,154,671 bp

Gene location (Mouse)
Chr.	X chromosome (mouse)
Band	X|X F1	Start	140,956,907 bp
Band	X|X F1	End	141,164,270 bp
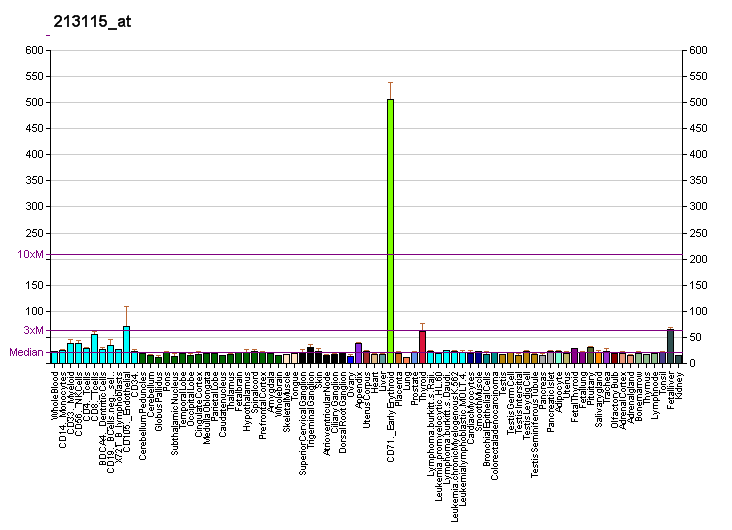
RNA expression pattern
Bgee	Human / Mouse (ortholog); Top expressed in: body of pancreas; gastrocnemius muscle; muscle of thigh; rectum; islet of Langerhans; tibialis anterior muscle; anterior pituitary; left ventricle; deltoid muscle; right lung / Top expressed in: bone marrow; quadriceps femoris muscle; muscle of thigh; proximal tubule; muscle tissue; right kidney; skeletal muscle tissue; ileum; granulocyte; lens; More reference expression data
BioGPS	More reference expression data
Gene ontology
Molecular function	peptidase activity; cysteine-type peptidase activity; protein binding; hydrolase activity; cysteine-type endopeptidase activity
Cellular component	cytoplasm; cytosol
Biological process	autophagy; protein transport; autophagy of nucleus; C-terminal protein lipidation; protein delipidation; autophagy of mitochondrion; autophagosome assembly; proteolysis; protein targeting to membrane
Sources:Amigo / QuickGO
Orthologs
Databases	NCBI: entry; OMA: entry
Species	Human	Mouse
Entrez	115201	666468
Ensembl	ENSG00000101844	ENSMUSG00000079418
UniProt	Q8WYN0	Q8C9S8
RefSeq (mRNA)	NM_052936; NM_178270; NM_178271; NM_001321287; NM_001321288 NM_001321289; NM_001321290	NM_174875
RefSeq (protein)	NP_001308216; NP_001308217; NP_001308218; NP_001308219; NP_443168 NP_840054; NP_840055	NP_777364; NP_001366610; NP_001366611; NP_001366612; NP_001366613
Location (UCSC)	Chr X: 108.09 – 108.15 Mb	Chr X: 140.96 – 141.16 Mb
PubMed search
- Wikidata
View/Edit Human	View/Edit Mouse

Cysteine protease ATG4A is an enzyme that in humans is encoded by the ATG4A gene.

Autophagy is the process by which endogenous proteins and damaged organelles are destroyed intracellularly. Autophagy is postulated to be essential for cell homeostasis and cell remodelling during differentiation, metamorphosis, non-apoptotic cell death, and aging. Reduced levels of autophagy have been described in some malignant tumors, and a role for autophagy in controlling the unregulated cell growth linked to cancer has been proposed. This gene encodes a member of the autophagin protein family. The encoded protein is also designated as a member of the C-54 family of cysteine proteases. Transcript variants that encode distinct isoforms have been identified.
