= Autophagy protein 5 =

Protein-coding gene in the species Homo sapiens

ATG5

Identifiers
- Aliases: ATG5, APG5, APG5-LIKE, APG5L, ASP, hAPG5, autophagy related 5, SCAR25
- External IDs: OMIM: 604261; MGI: 1277186; GeneCards: ATG5
Available structures
| PDB | Ortholog search: PDBe RCSB |
| PDB | List of PDB id codes 4GDK, 4GDL, 4NAW, 4TQ0, 4TQ1, 5D7G |

Gene location (Human)
| Chr. | Chromosome 6 (human) |
| Band | 6q21 | Start | 106,045,423 bp |
| Band | 6q21 | End | 106,325,791 bp |

Gene location (Mouse)
| Chr. | Chromosome 10 (mouse) |
| Band | 10 B2|10 23.24 cM | Start | 44,144,354 bp |
| Band | 10 B2|10 23.24 cM | End | 44,240,287 bp |
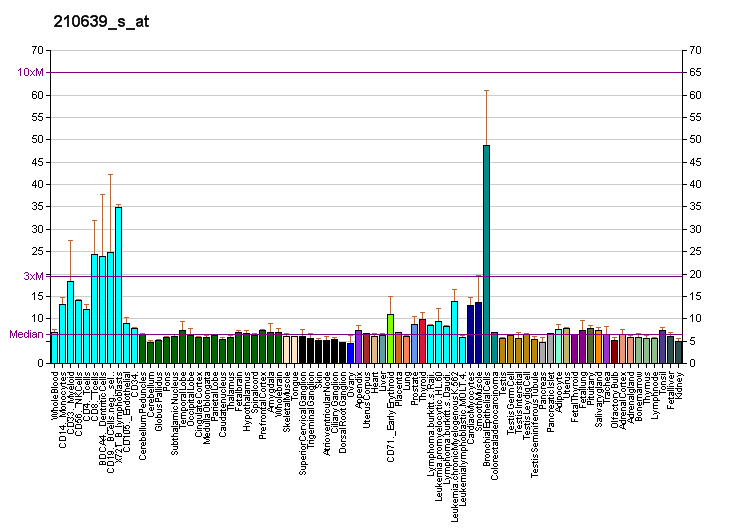

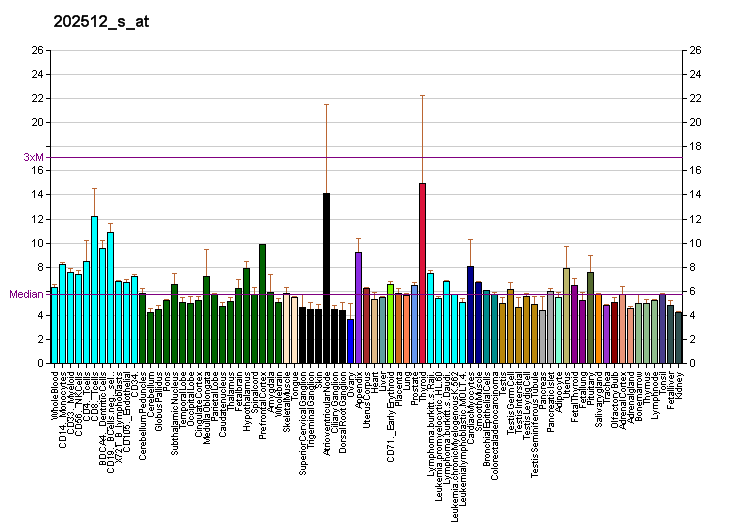

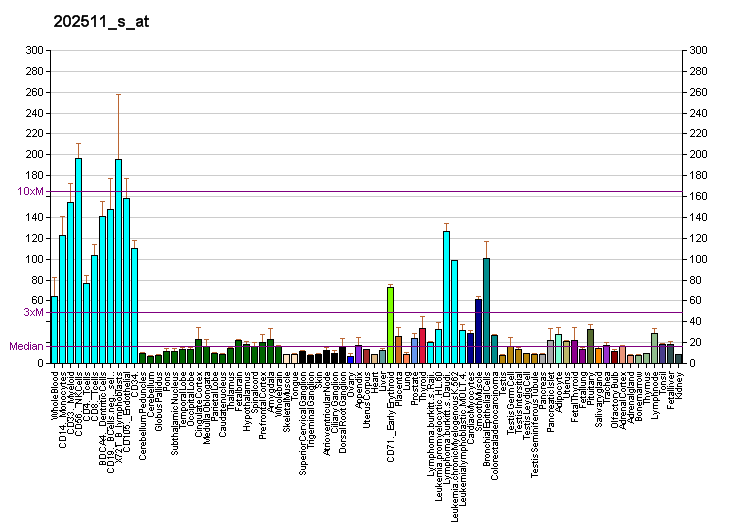
RNA expression pattern
| Bgee | Human / Mouse (ortholog); Top expressed in: gonad; mucosa of colon; mucosa of sigmoid colon; Achilles tendon; jejunal mucosa; endothelial cell; oocyte; rectum; islet of Langerhans; testicle / Top expressed in: primary oocyte; secondary oocyte; zygote; facial motor nucleus; lacrimal gland; epithelium of stomach; left lobe of liver; Rostral migratory stream; seminal vesicula; transitional epithelium of urinary bladder; More reference expression data |
| BioGPS | More reference expression data |
Gene ontology
| Molecular function | Atg8 ligase activity; protein binding |
| Cellular component | cytoplasm; phagophore assembly site membrane; cytosol; phagocytic vesicle membrane; membrane; Atg12-Atg5-Atg16 complex; autophagosome; axoneme; mitochondria associated membranes |
| Biological process | immune system process; negative regulation of cell death; C-terminal protein lipidation; autophagy of nucleus; cellular response to nitrogen starvation; apoptotic process; autophagosome assembly; autophagy of mitochondrion; blood vessel remodeling; cellular response to starvation; response to fungus; macroautophagy; cellular homeostasis; antigen processing and presentation of endogenous antigen; negative regulation of protein ubiquitination; aggrephagy; negative stranded viral RNA replication; vasodilation; negative regulation of apoptotic process; post-translational protein modification; negative thymic T cell selection; otolith development; negative regulation of phagocytosis; regulation of release of sequestered calcium ion into cytosol; ventricular cardiac muscle cell development; heart contraction; protein lipidation involved in autophagosome assembly; positive regulation of mucus secretion; cellular response to nitrosative stress; regulation of cilium assembly; regulation of reactive oxygen species metabolic process; negative regulation of reactive oxygen species metabolic process; negative regulation of histone H4-K16 acetylation; autophagy |
Sources:Amigo / QuickGO
Orthologs
| Databases | NCBI: entry; OMA: entry |
| Species | Human | Mouse |
| Entrez | 9474 | 11793 |
| Ensembl | ENSG00000057663 | ENSMUSG00000038160 |
| UniProt | Q9H1Y0 | Q99J83 |
| RefSeq (mRNA) | NM_001286106; NM_001286107; NM_001286108; NM_001286111; NM_004849 | NM_053069; NM_001314013; NM_001358596 |
| RefSeq (protein) | NP_001273035; NP_001273036; NP_001273037; NP_001273040; NP_004840 | NP_001300942; NP_444299; NP_001345525 |
| Location (UCSC) | Chr 6: 106.05 – 106.33 Mb | Chr 10: 44.14 – 44.24 Mb |
| PubMed search |
- Wikidata
| View/Edit Human | View/Edit Mouse |

Autophagy protein 5 (ATG5) is a protein that, in humans, is encoded by the ATG5 gene located on chromosome 6. It is an E3 ubi autophagic cell death. ATG5 is a key protein involved in the extension of the phagophoric membrane in autophagic vesicles. It is activated by ATG7 and forms a complex with ATG12 and ATG16L1. This complex is necessary for LC3-I (microtubule-associated proteins 1A/1B light chain 3B) conjugation to PE (phosphatidylethanolamine) to form LC3-II (LC3-phosphatidylethanolamine conjugate). ATG5 can also act as a pro-apoptotic molecule targeted to the mitochondria. Under low levels of DNA damage, ATG5 can translocate to the nucleus and interact with survivin.

ATG5 is known to be regulated via various stress induced transcription factors and protein kinases.

== Structure ==
ATG5 comprises three domains: a ubiquitin-like N-terminal domain (UblA), a helix-rich domain (HR) and a ubiquitin-like C-terminal domain (UblB). The three domains are connected by two linker regions (L1 and L2). ATG5 also has an alpha-helix at the N terminus where on Lysine 130 conjugation with ATG12 occurs. Both UblA and UbLB are composed of a five-stranded beta-sheet and two alpha-helices, a feature conserved in most ubiquitin and ubiquitin-like proteins. HR is composed of three long and one short alpha helices, forming a helix-bundle structure.

== Regulation ==
ATG5 is regulated by the p73 from the p53 family of transcription factors. DNA damage induces the p300 acetylase to acetylate p73 with the assistance of c-ABL tyrosine kinase. p73 translocates to the nucleus and acts as a transcription factor for ATG5 as well as other apoptotic and autophagic genes.

Programmed Cell Death Protein 4 (PDCD4) is known to inhibit ATG5 expression via inhibition of protein translation. Two MA3 domains on PDCD4 bind to RNA-helicase EIF4A, preventing translation of ATG5 mRNA.

Many protein kinases can regulate activity of the ATG5 protein. Phosphorylation by various kinases are required in order to achieve its active conformation. Under cell stress conditions, the growth arrest and DNA damage 45 beta (Gadd45ß) protein will interact with MAPK/ERK kinase kinase 4 (MEKK4) to form the Gadd45ß-MEKK4 signaling complex. This complex then activates and selectively targets p38 MAPK to the autophagosome to phosphorylate ATG5 at threonine 75. This leads to the inactivation of ATG5 and inhibition of autophagy.

ATG5 can also be regulated post translationally by microRNA.

== Function ==
=== Autophagy ===
The ATG12-ATG5:ATG16L complex is responsible for elongation of the phagophore in the autophagy pathway. ATG12 is first activated by ATG7, proceeded by the conjugation of ATG5 to the complex by ATG10 via a ubiquitination-like enzymatic process. The ATG12-ATG5 then forms a homo-oligomeric complex with ATG16L. With the help of ATG7 and ATG3, the ATG12-ATG5:ATG16L complex conjugates the C terminus of LC3-I to phosphatidylethanolamine in the phospholipid bilayer, allowing LC3 to associate with the membranes of the phagophore, becoming LC3-II. After formation of the autophagosome, the ATG12-ATG5:ATG16L complex dissociates from the autophagosome.

=== Apoptosis ===
In instances of spontaneous apoptosis or induction of apoptosis via staurosporine, HL-60, or EOL cells, ATG5 undergoes N-terminal cleavage by Calpain-1 and Calpain-2. The cleaved ATG5 translocates from the cytosol to the mitochondria, where it interacts with Bcl-xL, triggering the release of Cytochrome c and activating caspases leading to the apoptotic pathway. This function is independent of its role in autophagy, as it does not require interaction with ATG12.

=== Cell Cycle Arrest ===
In response to DNA damage, ATG5 expression is upregulated, increasing autophagy, preventing caspase activation and apoptosis. ATG5 is also responsible for G_{2}/M arrest and mitotic catastrophe by leading to the phosphorylation of CDK1 and CHEK2, two important regulators of cell cycle arrest. Furthermore, ATG5 is capable of translocating to the nucleus and interacting with survivin to disturb chromosome segregation by antagonistically competing with the ligand Aurora B.

== Clinical Significance ==
As a key regulator of autophagy, any suppression of the ATG5 protein or loss-of-function mutations in the ATG5 gene will negatively affect autophagy. As a result, deficiencies in the ATG5 protein and variations in the gene have been associated with various inflammatory and degenerative diseases as aggregates of ubiquitinated targets are not cleared out via autophagy. Polymorphisms within the Atg5 gene have been associated with Behçet's disease, systemic lupus erythematosus, and lupus nephritis. Mutations in the gene promoter for the Atg5 gene have been associated with sporadic Parkinson's disease and childhood asthma. Downregulation of ATG5 protein and mutations in the Atg5 gene have also been linked with prostate, gastrointestinal and colorectal cancers as ATG5 plays a role in both cell apoptosis and cell cycle arrest. Upregulation of Atg5 on the other hand has been shown to suppress melanoma tumorigenesis through induction of cell senescence. ATG5 also plays a protective role in M. tuberculosis infections by preventing PMN-mediated immunopathology.

An Atg5^{−/−} mutation in mice is known to be embryonic lethal. When the mutation is induced only in mice neurons or hepatocytes, there is an accumulation of ubiquitin-positive inclusion bodies and a decrease in cell function. Overexpression of ATG5 on the other hand has been linked to extend mouse lifespan. In the brain, ATG5 is responsible for astrocyte differentiation through activation of the JAK2-STAT3 pathway via degradation of SOCS2. Furthermore, reduction of ATG5 levels in mice brains leads to a suppression in differentiation and increase in cell proliferation of cortical neural progenitor cells through regulation of β-Catenin.
