= GABARAP =

Protein-coding gene in humans

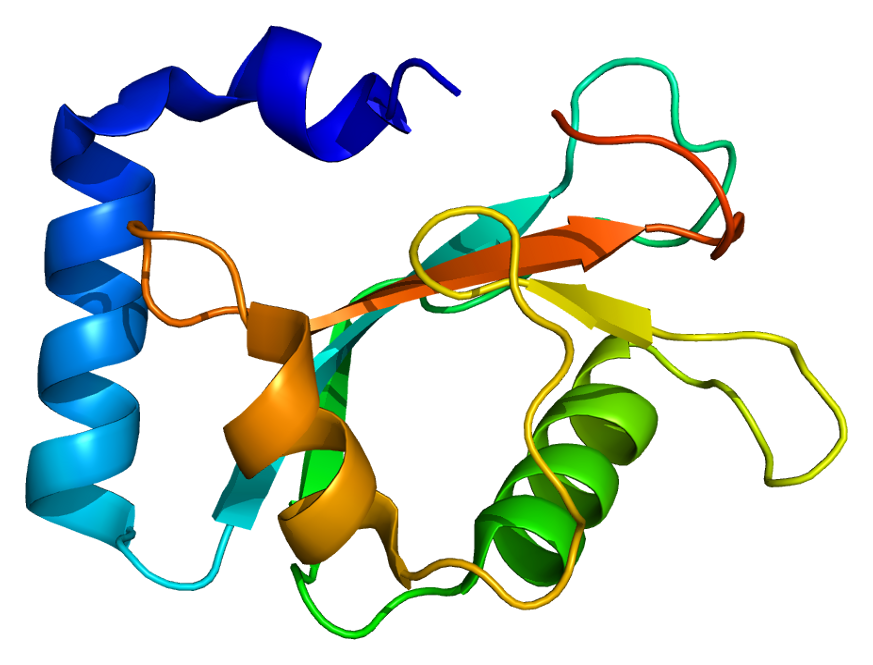

Identifiers
- Aliases: GABARAP, ATG8A, GABARAP-a, MM46, GABA type A receptor-associated protein
- External IDs: OMIM: 605125; MGI: 1861742; GeneCards: GABARAP
Available structures
PDB	Ortholog search: PDBe RCSB
PDB	List of PDB id codes 1GNU, 1KLV, 1KM7, 1KOT, 3D32, 3DOW, 3WIM, 4XC2

Gene location (Human)
Chr.	Chromosome 17 (human)
Band	17p13.1	Start	7,240,008 bp
Band	17p13.1	End	7,242,449 bp

Gene location (Mouse)
Chr.	Chromosome 11 (mouse)
Band	11 B3|11 42.95 cM	Start	69,881,969 bp
Band	11 B3|11 42.95 cM	End	69,885,777 bp
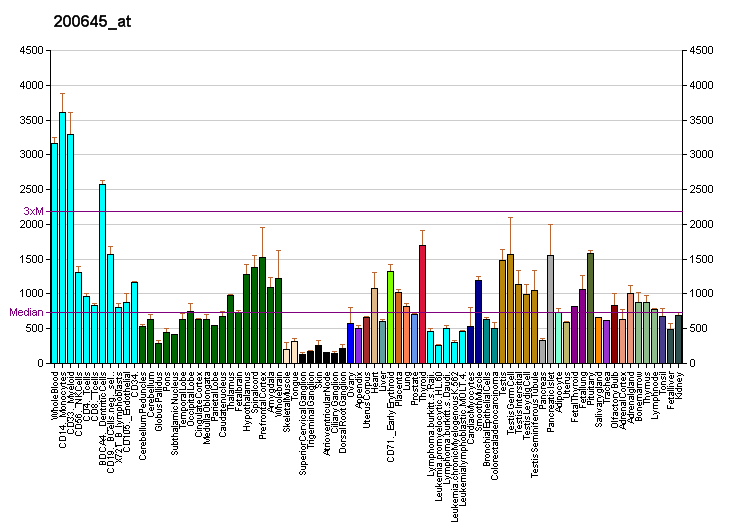
RNA expression pattern
Bgee	Human / Mouse (ortholog); Top expressed in: right testis; left testis; pituitary gland; anterior pituitary; monocyte; right adrenal gland; blood; right adrenal cortex; left adrenal cortex; C1 segment / Top expressed in: molar; calvaria; granulocyte; parotid gland; seminal vesicula; optic nerve; spermatid; atrium; blood; efferent ductule; More reference expression data
BioGPS	More reference expression data
Gene ontology
Molecular function	microtubule binding; protein binding; beta-tubulin binding; ubiquitin protein ligase binding; GABA receptor binding
Cellular component	cytoplasm; cell body; Golgi apparatus; membrane; Golgi membrane; plasma membrane; microtubule associated complex; smooth endoplasmic reticulum; autophagosome; autophagosome membrane; actin cytoskeleton; perinuclear region of cytoplasm; axoneme; lysosome; sperm midpiece; cytoskeleton; microtubule; cytoplasmic vesicle; endomembrane system; cytosol
Biological process	chemical synaptic transmission; protein targeting; autophagy; protein transport; macroautophagy; microtubule cytoskeleton organization; extrinsic apoptotic signaling pathway via death domain receptors; apoptotic process; autophagosome maturation; autophagosome assembly; autophagy of mitochondrion; cellular response to nitrogen starvation
Sources:Amigo / QuickGO
Orthologs
Databases	NCBI: entry; OMA: entry
Species	Human	Mouse
Entrez	11337	56486
Ensembl	ENSG00000170296	ENSMUSG00000018567
UniProt	O95166	Q9DCD6
RefSeq (mRNA)	NM_007278	NM_019749
RefSeq (protein)	NP_009209	NP_062723
Location (UCSC)	Chr 17: 7.24 – 7.24 Mb	Chr 11: 69.88 – 69.89 Mb
PubMed search
- Wikidata
View/Edit Human	View/Edit Mouse

Gamma-aminobutyric acid receptor-associated protein is a protein that in humans is encoded by the GABARAP gene.

== Function ==
Gamma-aminobutyric acid A receptors [GABA(A) receptors] are ligand-gated chloride channels that mediate inhibitory neurotransmission. This gene encodes GABA(A) receptor-associated protein, which is highly positively charged in its N-terminus and shares sequence similarity with light chain-3 of microtubule-associated proteins 1A and 1B. This protein clusters neurotransmitter receptors by mediating interaction with the cytoskeleton.

Moreover, GABARAP has an important function in autophagosome mediated autophagy, since it is crucial for autophagosome formation and sequestration of cytosolic cargo into double-membrane vesicles, leading to subsequent degradation after fusion with lysosomes. In addition, GABARAP can mediate selective autophagy because it binds to so-called autophagic receptors (e.g. p62, NBr1), which bind and recruit specific cargo.

== Interactions ==
GABARAP has been shown to interact with TFRC, ULK1 and GABRG2. A bound structure for GABARAP to GABRG2 consistent with experimental observations has been computationally derived.
