= Sequestosome 1 =

Protein-coding gene in humans

SQSTM1
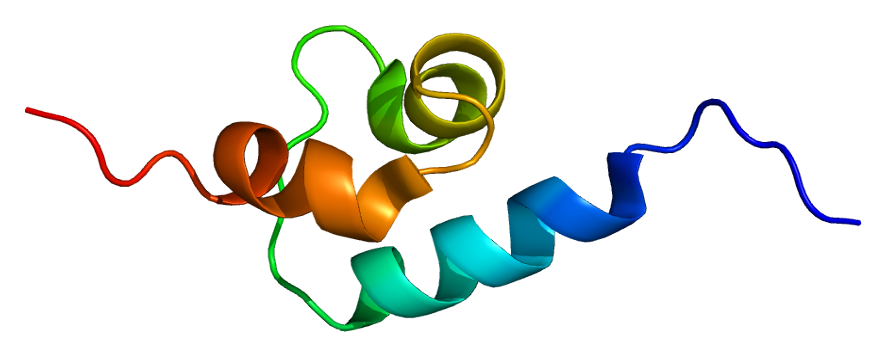

Identifiers
- Aliases: SQSTM1, A170, OSIL, PDB3, ZIP3, p60, p62, p62B, FTDALS3, Sequestosome 1, NADGP, DMRV
- External IDs: OMIM: 601530; MGI: 107931; GeneCards: SQSTM1
Available structures
PDB	Human UniProt search: PDBe RCSB
PDB	List of PDB id codes 1Q02, 2JY7, 2JY8, 2K0B, 2KNV, 4MJS, 4UF8, 4UF9

Gene location (Human)
Chr.	Chromosome 5 (human)
Band	5q35.3	Start	179,806,398 bp
Band	5q35.3	End	179,838,078 bp
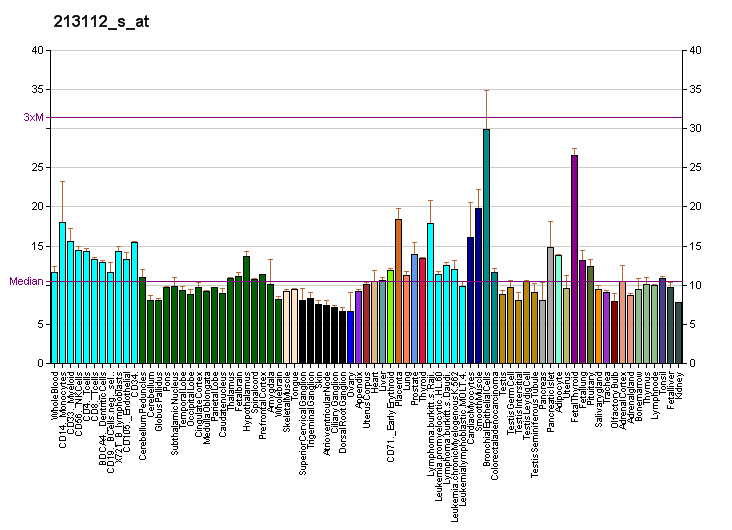

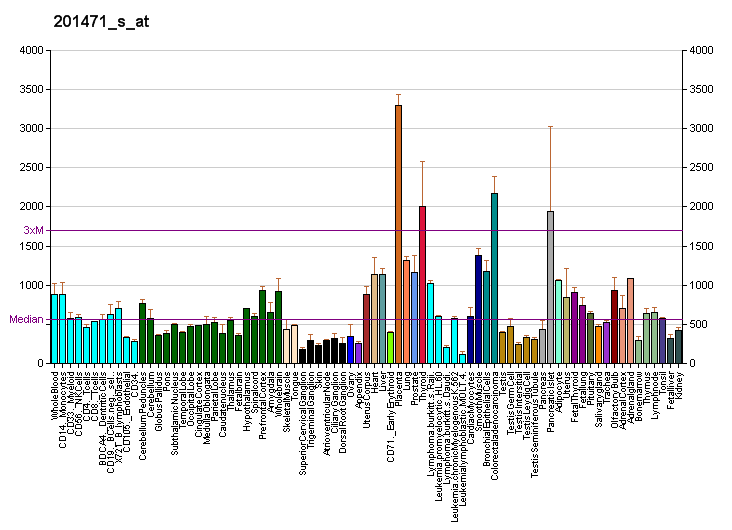
RNA expression pattern
Bgee	Human / Mouse (ortholog); Top expressed in: right adrenal cortex; left adrenal gland; left adrenal cortex; stromal cell of endometrium; muscle of thigh; right lobe of thyroid gland; left lobe of thyroid gland; gallbladder; gastric mucosa; Descending thoracic aorta / Top expressed in: dentate gyrus of hippocampal formation granule cell; muscle of thigh; right kidney; triceps brachii muscle; adrenal gland; ventromedial nucleus; superior frontal gyrus; temporal muscle; central gray substance of midbrain; sternocleidomastoid muscle; More reference expression data
BioGPS	More reference expression data
Gene ontology
Molecular function	protein homodimerization activity; receptor tyrosine kinase binding; zinc ion binding; SH2 domain binding; metal ion binding; protein serine/threonine kinase activity; K63-linked polyubiquitin modification-dependent protein binding; protein binding; identical protein binding; protein kinase binding; protein kinase C binding; ubiquitin binding; enzyme binding; ubiquitin protein ligase binding; ionotropic glutamate receptor binding
Cellular component	cytoplasm; endosome; PML body; late endosome; P-body; phagophore assembly site; nucleoplasm; aggresome; autophagosome; amphisome; endoplasmic reticulum; inclusion body; lysosome; sperm midpiece; extracellular exosome; cytoplasmic vesicle; nucleus; cytosol; intracellular membrane-bounded organelle; autolysosome; mitochondrion; sarcomere; Lewy body
Biological process	apoptotic process; protein localization; cell differentiation; positive regulation of protein phosphorylation; intracellular signal transduction; ubiquitin-dependent protein catabolic process; regulation of mitochondrion organization; protein heterooligomerization; immune system process; response to stress; regulation of Ras protein signal transduction; negative regulation of apoptotic process; autophagy; endosomal transport; regulation of protein complex stability; autophagy of mitochondrion; positive regulation of apoptotic process; regulation of I-kappaB kinase/NF-kappaB signaling; positive regulation of transcription by RNA polymerase II; negative regulation of transcription by RNA polymerase II; protein phosphorylation; mitophagy; response to mitochondrial depolarisation; macroautophagy; endosome organization; protein localization to perinuclear region of cytoplasm; response to ischemia; mitochondrion organization; aggrephagy; selective autophagy; interleukin-1-mediated signaling pathway; positive regulation of long-term synaptic potentiation; positive regulation of protein localization to plasma membrane
Sources:Amigo / QuickGO
Orthologs
Databases	NCBI: entry; OMA: entry
Species	Human	Mouse
Entrez	8878	18412
Ensembl	ENSG00000161011; ENSG00000284099	ENSMUSG00000015837
UniProt	Q13501	n/a
RefSeq (mRNA)	NM_001142298; NM_001142299; NM_003900	NM_001290769; NM_011018
RefSeq (protein)	NP_001135770; NP_001135771; NP_003891	n/a
Location (UCSC)	Chr 5: 179.81 – 179.84 Mb	n/a
PubMed search
- Wikidata
View/Edit Human	View/Edit Mouse

Sequestosome-1 is a protein that in humans is encoded by the SQSTM1 gene. Also known as the ubiquitin-binding protein p62, it is an autophagosome cargo protein that targets other proteins that bind to it for selective autophagy. By interacting with GATA4 and targeting it for degradation, it can inhibit GATA-4 associated senescence and senescence-associated secretory phenotype.

Mutations in SQSTM1 are a common cause of Paget's disease of bone.

== Interactions ==
Sequestosome 1 has been shown to interact with:

- MAP1LC3A,
- PRKCI,
- RAD23A,
- RIPK1,
- TRAF6
- TrkA, and
- TrkB.
- Nrf2

== Role in cancer ==
The SQSTM1 gene, which is actively transcribed as part of normal cellular function, is sometimes identified in fusion proteins, which can cause cancer when SQSTM1 is abnormally fused to a tyrosine kinase or other pro-proliferation gene. These genes are normally tightly regulated, but when bound to a minimally regulated gene like SQSTM1, they cause abnormal over-expression.
