= ATG10 =

Protein-coding gene in the species Homo sapiens

Identifiers
- Aliases: ATG10, APG10, APG10L, pp12616, autophagy related 10
- External IDs: OMIM: 610800; MGI: 1914045; GeneCards: ATG10

Gene location (Human)
Chr.	Chromosome 5 (human)
Band	5q14.1-q14.2	Start	81,972,023 bp
Band	5q14.1-q14.2	End	82,276,857 bp

Gene location (Mouse)
Chr.	Chromosome 13 (mouse)
Band	13|13 C3	Start	91,083,475 bp
Band	13|13 C3	End	91,372,087 bp
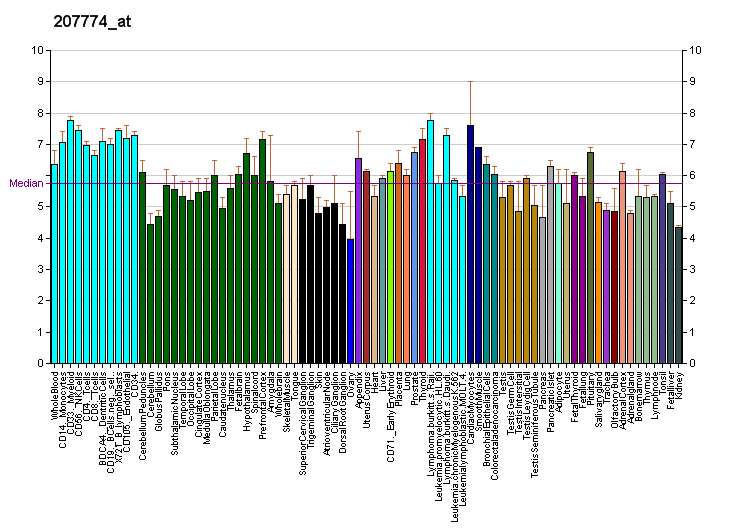
RNA expression pattern
Bgee	Human / Mouse (ortholog); Top expressed in: testicle; gonad; islet of Langerhans; monocyte; ganglionic eminence; tibial arteries; skin of abdomen; gastrocnemius muscle; right coronary artery; stromal cell of endometrium / Top expressed in: interventricular septum; Epithelium of choroid plexus; epithelium of small intestine; myocardium of ventricle; intercostal muscle; right kidney; extraocular muscle; facial motor nucleus; Rostral migratory stream; lumbar spinal ganglion; More reference expression data
BioGPS	More reference expression data
Gene ontology
Molecular function	Atg12 transferase activity; transferase activity
Cellular component	cytoplasm; cytosol; intracellular anatomical structure
Biological process	autophagy; protein transport; protein modification by small protein conjugation; macroautophagy; positive regulation of protein modification process; ER overload response; protein lipidation
Sources:Amigo / QuickGO
Orthologs
Databases	NCBI: entry; OMA: entry
Species	Human	Mouse
Entrez	83734	66795
Ensembl	ENSG00000152348	ENSMUSG00000021619
UniProt	Q9H0Y0	Q8R1P4
RefSeq (mRNA)	NM_001131028; NM_031482	NM_025770
RefSeq (protein)	NP_001124500; NP_113670	NP_080046; NP_001391846; NP_001391847; NP_001391848; NP_001391849 NP_001391850; NP_001391851; NP_001391852; NP_001391854; NP_001391855; NP_001391856; NP_001391857
Location (UCSC)	Chr 5: 81.97 – 82.28 Mb	Chr 13: 91.08 – 91.37 Mb
PubMed search
- Wikidata
View/Edit Human	View/Edit Mouse

Autophagy-related protein 10 is a protein that in humans is encoded by the ATG10 gene.
