= Autophagin =

Protease

Autophagin-1 (Atg4/Apg4) is a unique cysteine protease responsible for the cleavage of the carboxyl terminus of Atg8/Apg8/Aut7, a reaction essential for its lipidation during autophagy. Human Atg4 homologues cleave the carboxyl termini of the three human Atg8 homologues, microtubule-associated protein light chain 3 (LC3), GABARAP, and GATE-16. The Protein is approximately 393 amino acids long and has a relative molecular mass of about 43-44 kDa.

Autophagy is currently being researched in relation to several human disorders. The future challenge is to develop methods to separately manipulate the activity of each of the autophagic pathways. This would allow researchers to further understand their contribution to disease such as cancer, neurodegeneration, infectious disease, muscular disorders and possibly will provide therapeutic tools.

== See also ==
- Autophagy
- Apoptosis
- Ubiquitin
