= MAP1A =

Protein-coding gene in the species Homo sapiens

Identifiers
- Aliases: MAP1A, MAP1L, MTAP1A, microtubule associated protein 1A
- External IDs: OMIM: 600178; MGI: 1306776; GeneCards: MAP1A

Gene location (Mouse)
Chr.	Chromosome 2 (mouse)
Band	2 E5|2 60.37 cM	Start	121,120,081 bp
Band	2 E5|2 60.37 cM	End	121,141,313 bp
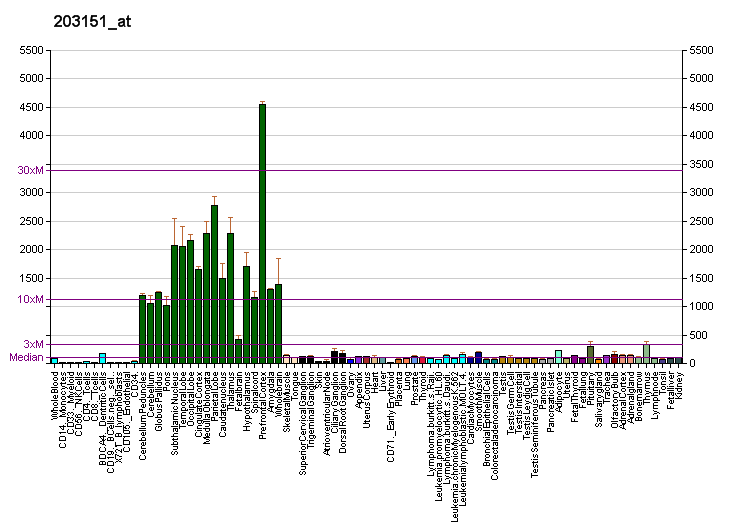

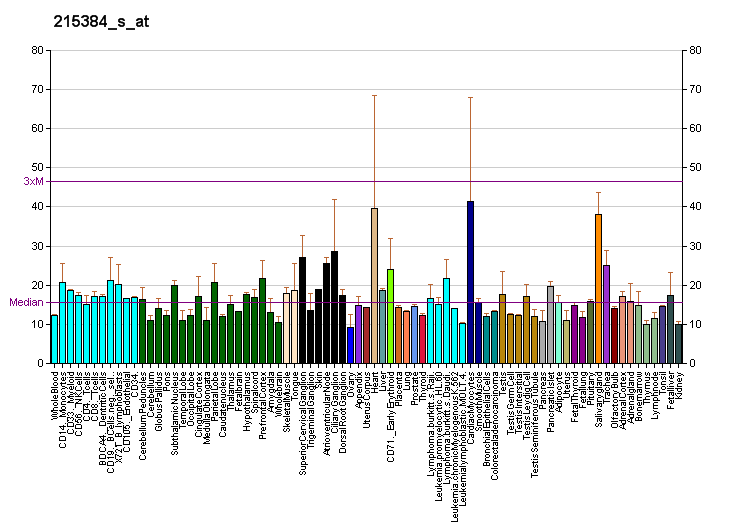
RNA expression pattern
Bgee	Human / Mouse (ortholog); Top expressed in: Brodmann area 10; external globus pallidus; Region I of hippocampus proper; postcentral gyrus; Brodmann area 46; superior vestibular nucleus; pons; entorhinal cortex; orbitofrontal cortex; frontal pole / Top expressed in: primary visual cortex; superior frontal gyrus; dentate gyrus of hippocampal formation granule cell; subiculum; pontine nuclei; central gray substance of midbrain; medial vestibular nucleus; prefrontal cortex; dorsal tegmental nucleus; cerebellar cortex; More reference expression data
BioGPS	More reference expression data
Gene ontology
Molecular function	microtubule binding; protein binding; structural molecule activity; actin binding; cytoskeletal anchor activity; tubulin binding; tau protein binding
Cellular component	cytoplasm; microtubule; cytoskeleton; microtubule associated complex; cytosol; axon; dendrite; cell projection; neuron projection; soma; axon initial segment; dendritic shaft; dendritic branch; synapse; primary dendrite; dendritic microtubule; axon cytoplasm
Biological process	microtubule cytoskeleton organization; axonogenesis; memory; associative learning; dendrite development; regulation of microtubule depolymerization; negative regulation of proteasomal ubiquitin-dependent protein catabolic process; regulation of synaptic plasticity; voluntary musculoskeletal movement; neuron cellular homeostasis; anterograde axonal protein transport; retrograde axonal protein transport; negative regulation of protein localization to microtubule; positive regulation of protein localization; neuron projection maintenance; positive regulation of protein localization to cell surface
Sources:Amigo / QuickGO
Orthologs
Databases	NCBI: entry
Species	Human	Mouse
Entrez	4130	17754
Ensembl	n/a	ENSMUSG00000027254
UniProt	P78559	Q9QYR6
RefSeq (mRNA)	NM_002373	NM_001173506; NM_032393
RefSeq (protein)	NP_002364	NP_001166977; NP_115769
Location (UCSC)	n/a	Chr 2: 121.12 – 121.14 Mb
PubMed search
- Wikidata
View/Edit Human	View/Edit Mouse

Microtubule-associated protein 1A is a protein that in humans is encoded by the MAP1A gene.

== Function ==
This gene encodes a protein that belongs to the microtubule-associated protein family. The proteins of this family are thought to be involved in microtubule assembly, which is an essential step in neurogenesis. The product of this gene is a precursor polypeptide that presumably undergoes proteolytic processing to generate the final MAP1A heavy chain and LC2 light chain. Expression of this gene is almost exclusively in the brain. Studies of the rat microtubule-associated protein 1A gene suggested a role in early events of spinal cord development.

== Interactions ==
MAP1A has been shown to interact with DISC1.
