= ATG7 =

Protein-coding gene in the species Homo sapiens

Identifiers
- Aliases: ATG7, APG7-LIKE, APG7L, GSA7, autophagy related 7, SCAR31
- External IDs: OMIM: 608760; MGI: 1921494; GeneCards: ATG7

Gene location (Human)
Chr.	Chromosome 3 (human)
Band	3p25.3	Start	11,272,309 bp
Band	3p25.3	End	11,557,665 bp

Gene location (Mouse)
Chr.	Chromosome 6 (mouse)
Band	6|6 E3	Start	114,620,058 bp
Band	6|6 E3	End	114,837,575 bp
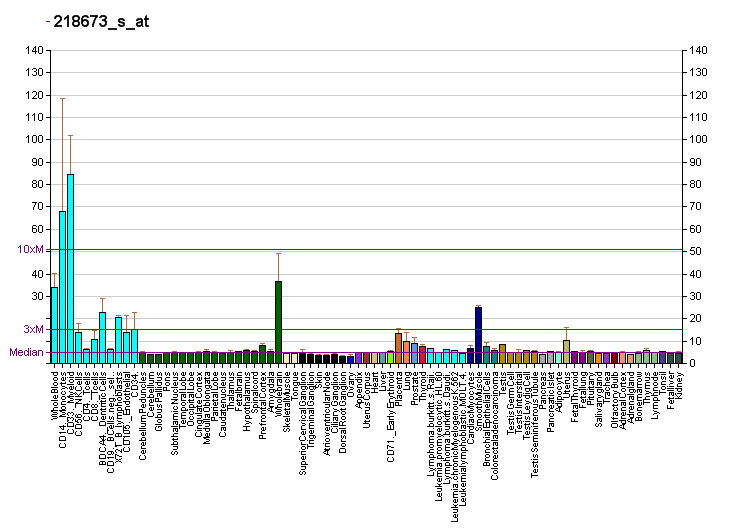
RNA expression pattern
Bgee	Human / Mouse (ortholog); Top expressed in: monocyte; Achilles tendon; oocyte; islet of Langerhans; epithelium of colon; testicle; granulocyte; blood; buccal mucosa cell; rectum / Top expressed in: lumbar spinal ganglion; granulocyte; spermatocyte; morula; morula; spermatid; genital tubercle; tail of embryo; zygote; left lobe of liver; More reference expression data
BioGPS	More reference expression data
Gene ontology
Molecular function	protein homodimerization activity; transcription factor binding; ubiquitin activating enzyme activity; protein binding; ubiquitin-like modifier activating enzyme activity; Atg12 activating enzyme activity; Atg8 activating enzyme activity
Cellular component	cytoplasm; axoneme; extracellular region; axon; secretory granule lumen; ficolin-1-rich granule lumen; cytosol; phagophore assembly site
Biological process	positive regulation of protein catabolic process; cellular response to hyperoxia; cellular response to starvation; membrane fusion; defense response to virus; positive regulation of protein modification process; positive regulation of apoptotic process; protein transport; protein lipidation; suppression by virus of host autophagy; protein ubiquitination; autophagy; ageing; response to glucose; macroautophagy; response to nutrient levels; neutrophil degranulation; negative regulation of cell death; cellular response to morphine; negative regulation of mitochondrial DNA replication; regulation of neuron death; response to fluoride; negative regulation of oxidative stress-induced neuron death; autophagy of mitochondrion; autophagosome assembly; C-terminal protein lipidation; cellular response to nitrogen starvation; piecemeal microautophagy of the nucleus; late nucleophagy; positive regulation of autophagy; regulation of circadian rhythm; chaperone-mediated autophagy; protein modification by small protein conjugation; rhythmic process
Sources:Amigo / QuickGO
Orthologs
Databases	NCBI: entry; OMA: entry
Species	Human	Mouse
Entrez	10533	74244
Ensembl	ENSG00000197548	ENSMUSG00000030314
UniProt	O95352	Q9D906
RefSeq (mRNA)	NM_001136031; NM_001144912; NM_006395; NM_001349232; NM_001349233 NM_001349234; NM_001349235; NM_001349236; NM_001349237; NM_001349238	NM_001253717; NM_001253718; NM_028835; NM_001379130
RefSeq (protein)	NP_001129503; NP_001138384; NP_006386; NP_001336161; NP_001336162 NP_001336163; NP_001336164; NP_001336165; NP_001336166; NP_001336167	NP_001240646; NP_001240647; NP_083111; NP_001366059
Location (UCSC)	Chr 3: 11.27 – 11.56 Mb	Chr 6: 114.62 – 114.84 Mb
PubMed search
- Wikidata
View/Edit Human	View/Edit Mouse

Autophagy related 7 is a protein in humans encoded by ATG7 gene. Related to GSA7; APG7L; APG7-LIKE.

ATG 7, present in both plant and animal genomes, acts as an essential protein for cell degradation and its recycling. The sequence associates with the ubiquitin- proteasome system, UPS, required for the unique development of an autophagosomal membrane and fusion within cells.

ATG7 was identified based on homology to yeast cells Pichia pastoris GSA7 and Saccharomyces cerevisiae APG7. The protein appears to be required for fusion of peroxisomal and vacuolar membranes.

Autophagy is an important cellular process that helps in maintaining homeostasis. It goes through destroying and recycling the cytoplasmic organelles and macromolecules. During the initiation of autophagy, ATG7 acts like an E-1 enzyme for ubiquitin-like proteins (UBL) such as ATG12 and ATG8. ATG7 helps these UBL proteins in targeting their molecule by binding to them and activating their transfer to an E-2 enzyme. ATG7's role in both of these autophagy-specific UBL systems makes it an essential regulator of autophagosome assembly.

Homologous to the ATP-binding and catalytic sites of E1 activator proteins, ATG7 uses its cysteine residue to create a thiol-ester bond with free Ubiquitin molecules. Through UPS, Ubiquitin will continue to bind to other autophagy-related proteins, E2 conjugation proteins and E3 protein ligases, to attach Ubiquitins to a target substrate to induce autophagy.

ATG 7 is often associated with ATG12/ ATG5 sequenced ubiquitination cascade. As well in presence of p53 cell cycle pathways during stressed and nutrient poor environments.
