= MAP1B =

Protein-coding gene in the species Homo sapiens

Identifiers
- Aliases: MAP1B, FUTSCH, MAP5, PPP1R102, microtubule-associated protein 1B, microtubule associated protein 1B, PVNH9, DFNA83
- External IDs: OMIM: 157129; MGI: 1306778; GeneCards: MAP1B

Gene location (Human)
Chr.	Chromosome 5 (human)
Band	5q13.2	Start	72,107,234 bp
Band	5q13.2	End	72,209,565 bp

Gene location (Mouse)
Chr.	Chromosome 13 (mouse)
Band	13 D1|13 52.9 cM	Start	99,557,954 bp
Band	13 D1|13 52.9 cM	End	99,653,048 bp
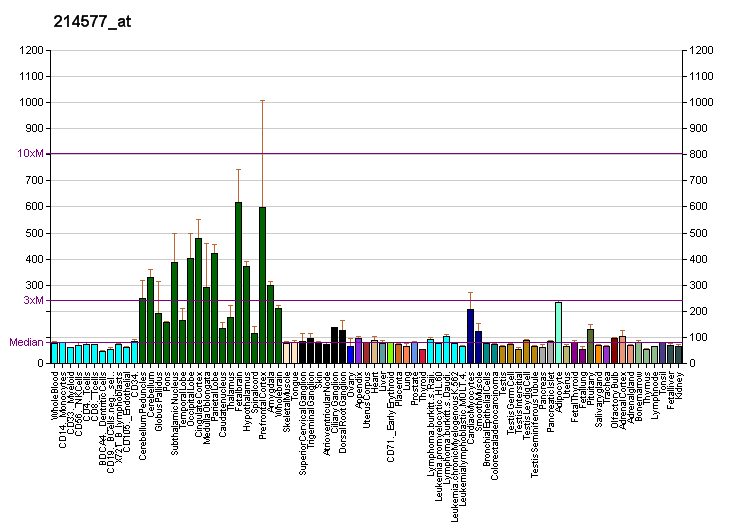
RNA expression pattern
Bgee	Human / Mouse (ortholog); Top expressed in: lateral nuclear group of thalamus; pars compacta; middle temporal gyrus; pars reticulata; Brodmann area 23; superior vestibular nucleus; pons; external globus pallidus; parietal lobe; postcentral gyrus / Top expressed in: facial motor nucleus; anterior horn of spinal cord; median eminence; substantia nigra; medial dorsal nucleus; habenula; medial vestibular nucleus; Rostral migratory stream; pontine nuclei; medial geniculate nucleus; More reference expression data
BioGPS	More reference expression data
Gene ontology
Molecular function	microtubule binding; structural molecule activity; protein binding; actin binding; tubulin binding; phospholipid binding; protein-containing complex binding
Cellular component	cell projection; postsynaptic density; plasma membrane; dendritic spine; photoreceptor outer segment; synapse; microtubule associated complex; cell junction; microtubule; cytoskeleton; cytoplasm; cytosol; axon; dendrite; somatodendritic compartment; soma; apical dendrite; basal dendrite; hippocampal mossy fiber; growth cone; varicosity; perikaryon; perinuclear region of cytoplasm
Biological process	negative regulation of intracellular transport; axonogenesis; dendrite development; nervous system development; microtubule bundle formation; axon extension; positive regulation of axon extension; mitochondrion transport along microtubule; establishment of monopolar cell polarity; cellular process or phenomenon; microtubule cytoskeleton organization; neuron migration; regulation of microtubule depolymerization; negative regulation of microtubule depolymerization; synapse assembly; response to wounding; response to mechanical stimulus; response to carbohydrate; response to inorganic substance; peripheral nervous system axon regeneration; response to insecticide; developmental maturation; positive regulation of microtubule polymerization; response to nutrient levels; response to estradiol; response to vitamin A; positive regulation of neuron differentiation; neuron development; response to axon injury; induction of synaptic plasticity by chemical substance; cellular response to growth factor stimulus; cellular response to peptide hormone stimulus
Sources:Amigo / QuickGO
Orthologs
Databases	NCBI: entry; OMA: entry
Species	Human	Mouse
Entrez	4131	17755
Ensembl	ENSG00000131711	ENSMUSG00000052727
UniProt	P46821	P14873
RefSeq (mRNA)	NM_005909; NM_032010; NM_001324255	NM_008634
RefSeq (protein)	NP_001311184; NP_005900	NP_032660
Location (UCSC)	Chr 5: 72.11 – 72.21 Mb	Chr 13: 99.56 – 99.65 Mb
PubMed search
- Wikidata
View/Edit Human	View/Edit Mouse

Microtubule-associated protein 1B is a protein that in humans is encoded by the MAP1B gene.

== Function ==
This gene encodes a protein that belongs to the microtubule-associated protein family. The proteins of this family are thought to be involved in microtubule assembly, which is an essential step in neurogenesis. The product of this gene is a precursor polypeptide that presumably undergoes proteolytic processing to generate the final MAP1B heavy chain and LC1 light chain. Gene knockout studies of the mouse microtubule-associated protein 1B gene suggested an important role in development and function of the nervous system. Two alternatively spliced transcript variants have been described.

== Interactions ==
MAP1B has been shown to interact with Acidic leucine-rich nuclear phosphoprotein 32 family member A and RASSF1.
