= ATG12 =

Protein-coding gene in the species Homo sapiens

Identifiers
- Aliases: ATG12, APG12, APG12L, FBR93, HAPG12, autophagy related 12
- External IDs: OMIM: 609608; MGI: 1914776; GeneCards: ATG12
Available structures
PDB	Ortholog search: PDBe RCSB
PDB	List of PDB id codes 4GDK, 4GDL, 4NAW

Gene location (Human)
Chr.	Chromosome 5 (human)
Band	5q22.3	Start	115,828,200 bp
Band	5q22.3	End	115,841,837 bp

Gene location (Mouse)
Chr.	Chromosome 18 (mouse)
Band	18|18 C	Start	46,863,211 bp
Band	18|18 C	End	46,874,647 bp
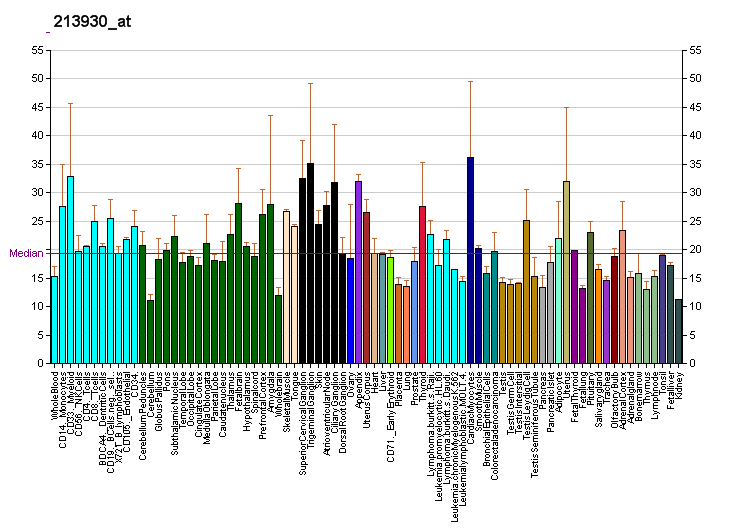

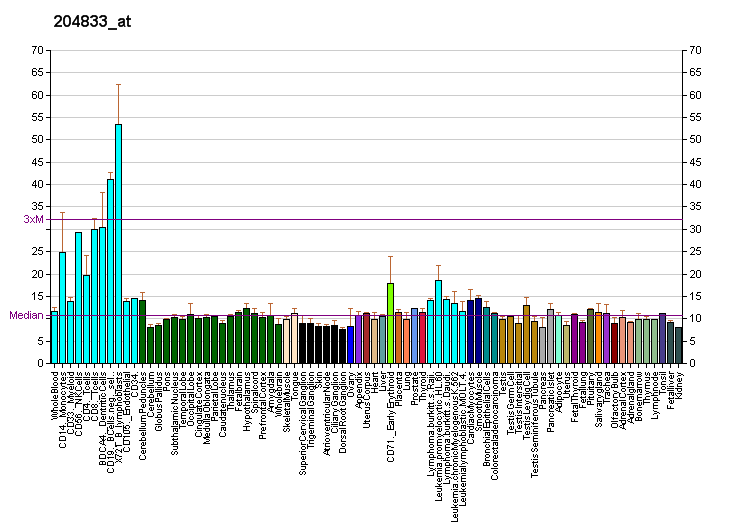

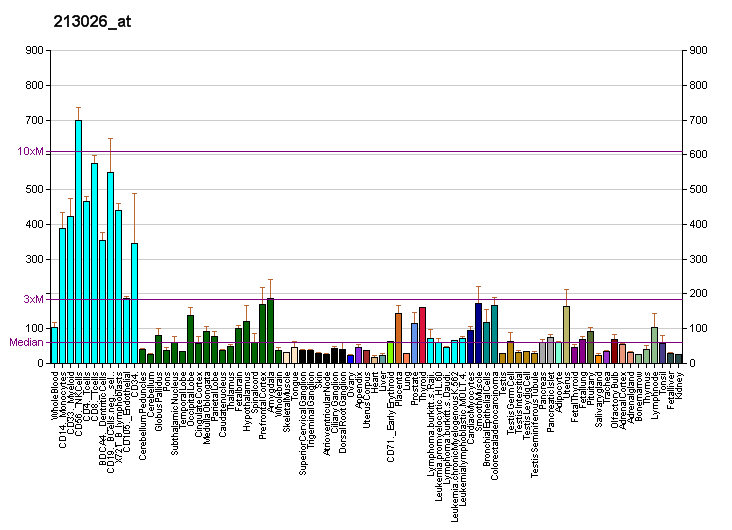
RNA expression pattern
Bgee	Human / Mouse (ortholog); Top expressed in: Achilles tendon; pericardium; pars reticulata; pons; lateral nuclear group of thalamus; corpus callosum; pars compacta; external globus pallidus; subthalamic nucleus; visceral pleura / Top expressed in: blood; cumulus cell; trigeminal ganglion; primary oocyte; lumbar spinal ganglion; perirhinal cortex; entorhinal cortex; retinal pigment epithelium; choroid plexus; spermatocyte; More reference expression data
BioGPS	More reference expression data
Gene ontology
Molecular function	protein binding; Atg8 ligase activity
Cellular component	cytoplasm; cytosol; phagophore assembly site membrane; phagocytic vesicle membrane; Atg12-Atg5-Atg16 complex; membrane; autophagosome; protein-containing complex
Biological process	autophagy; autophagy of nucleus; C-terminal protein lipidation; autophagy of mitochondrion; macroautophagy; autophagosome assembly
Sources:Amigo / QuickGO
Orthologs
Databases	NCBI: entry; OMA: entry
Species	Human	Mouse
Entrez	9140	67526
Ensembl	ENSG00000145782	ENSMUSG00000032905
UniProt	O94817	Q9CQY1
RefSeq (mRNA)	NM_001277783; NM_004707	NM_026217
RefSeq (protein)	NP_001264712; NP_004698	NP_080493
Location (UCSC)	Chr 5: 115.83 – 115.84 Mb	Chr 18: 46.86 – 46.87 Mb
PubMed search
- Wikidata
View/Edit Human	View/Edit Mouse

Autophagy related 12 is a protein that in humans is encoded by the ATG12 gene.

Autophagy is a process of bulk protein degradation in which cytoplasmic components, including organelles, are enclosed in double-membrane structures called autophagosomes and delivered to lysosomes or vacuoles for degradation. ATG12 is the human homolog of a yeast protein involved in autophagy (Mizushima et al., 1998).[supplied by OMIM]

Autophagy requires the covalent attachment of the protein Atg12 to ATG5 through a ubiquitin-like conjugation system. The Atg12-Atg5 conjugate then promotes the conjugation of ATG8 to the lipid phosphatidylethanolamine.

Atg12 was found to be involved in apoptosis. This protein promotes apoptosis through an interaction with anti-apoptotic members of the Bcl-2 family.
