= ACAMPs =

Molecular markers associated with apoptosis

Apoptotic-cell associated molecular patterns (ACAMPs) are molecular markers present on cells which are going through apoptosis, i.e. programmed cell death (similarly, Pathogen-associated molecular patterns (PAMPs) are markers of invading pathogens and Damage-associated molecular patterns (DAMPs) are markers of damaged tissue). The term was used for the first time by C. D. Gregory in 2000. Recognition of these patterns by the pattern recognition receptors (PRRs) of phagocytes then leads to phagocytosis of the apoptotic cell. These patterns include eat-me signals on the apoptotic cells, loss of don't-eat-me signals on viable cells and come-get-me signals (also find-me signals)) secreted by the apoptotic cells in order to attract phagocytes (mostly macrophages and immature dendritic cells). Thanks to these markers, apoptotic cells, unlike necrotic cells, do not trigger the unwanted immune response.

== Eat-me signals ==
Eat-me signals mark the apoptotic cells for phagocytes which can subsequently engulf them and actively prevent the inflammation. Various molecular markers can serve as eat-me signals, particularly a change in composition of the cell membrane, modifications of molecules on the cell surface, changed charge on the plasma membrane, or indirectly the extracellular bridging molecules.

=== Cell membrane composition ===
Deposition of different phospholipids in the phospholipid bilayer of the cell membrane is strictly asymmetric. On a viable cell, phosphatidylserine is only present in the inner layer of the cell membrane – this is maintained by aminophospholipid translocase. During apoptosis, the phospholipid scrambling activity occurs and the aminophospholipid translocase activity is reduced. Consequently, the phosphatidylserine content in the outer leaflet of the membrane is quickly increased. It is then recognized by one or more receptors of the phagocytes. The phosphatidylserine molecules can also be oxidized and contribute to the induction of engulfment.

=== Surface molecules ===
Some molecules naturally present on cells can also work as eat-me signals after certain modifications. The externalized phospholipids can be oxidized and recognized by scavenger receptors of the phagocytes. Similarly, adhesion molecule ICAM3, normally recognized by macrophage integrins, is after alteration bound by macrophage CD14.

Additionally, some intracellular molecules are displayed on the cell surface after induction of the apoptotic program to ease the recognition. As an example, annexin I is externalized in the same locations as phosphatidylserine and helps with clustering phagocytic phosphatidylserine receptors around the apoptotic cell. Another externalized molecule marking apoptotic cells is calreticulin.

Generally, the ability of apoptotic cells to change their charge with polyanionic structures marks them as a target for phagocytosis.

=== Extracellular bridging molecules ===
Extracellular bridging molecules are serum proteins which facilitate connection between apoptotic cell and phagocyte. They can also be seen as secreted forms of pattern recognition receptors (PRRs).^{7} These include collectins, components of complement pathways (e.g. C1q, C3b) and other molecules found in extracellular space. Collectins (e.g. mannose-binding lectin and surfactant protein A) bind the altered surface sugars on apoptotic cell and enable easier uptake by phagocytes which recognize their complex with calreticulin.

Besides complement particles C1q and C3b which help to opsonize the apoptotic cells, also thrombospondin, pentraxins (C-reactive protein and serum amyloid P), β2GP1, MFG-E8 and GAS-6 are also capable of creating a bridge between macrophage and apoptotic cell.

== Don't-eat-me signals ==
Don't-eat-me signals (also SAMPs = self-associated molecular patterns) are present on all host viable cells and actively protect the cells from engulfment. They achieve this by facilitating a detachment of phagocytes from the cell (CD31-CD31 interaction) or even sending repulsive signals towards the phagocyte (CD47-SIRPα interaction). Another molecule, CD300a binds the externalized phospholipids and prevents the phagocytosis. During apoptosis, these signals must be removed or changed in order not to block the ingestion by phagocyte.

Another marker of non-apoptotic cells is specific surface molecules glycosylation. The sugar chains are usually terminated with sialic acid which then binds various molecules and receptors and efficiently prevents the cell from phagocytosis.

Non-apoptotic cells also express complement inhibitors, preventing the assembly of C3 convertase or the lytic pore. Among soluble inhibitors there are factor H, C1 inhibitor, C4b-binding protein, factor I, S protein or clusterin, the membrane-bound inhibitors are CR1, membrane cofactor protein (MCF), decay accelerating factor (DAF) or protectin (CD59).

== Come-get-me signals ==
Phagocytes are attracted to the site with apoptotic cells by so-called come-get-me or find-me signals. During apoptosis, caspase 3 activates the Ca2+-independent phospholipase A2, leading to release of lysophosphatidylcholine which acts as such attractant. Other find-me signals include fractalkine, sphingosine-1-phosphate, ATP and UTP nucleotides, or endothelial monocyte-activating polypeptide II (EMAP II).

== Phagocyte receptors involved in ACAPMs recognition ==
Diversity of ACAMPs requires many receptor families for their recognition. These include scavenger receptors (e.g. CD36, CD68, LOX-1 recognizing oxidized LDL), integrins (e.g. α_{v}β_{3}recognizing MFG-E8 or thrombospondin), lectins (binding the altered sugars), the receptor tyrosine kinase MER (recognizing GAS-6), LRP1 (interacts with calreticulin which is a known C1q receptor), or complement receptors (CR3 and CR4).

There is a variety of receptors which recognize the externalized phosphatidylserine. Among others, brain-specific angiogenesis inhibitor 1 (BAI1), T-cell immunoglobulin and mucin-domain-containing molecule 4 (TIM-4) and TIM-1, stabilin-2, receptor for advanced glycation end products (RAGE), The phosphatidylserine receptor (PSR), previously thought to mediate the engulfment of apoptotic cells, was shown to only indirectly contribute to the process.

Certain molecules which are numbered among ACAMPs are recognized by pattern recognition receptors (PRR) because they share structural characteristics with PAMPs. As an example, CD14 normally binds lipopolysaccharide (LPS) on the surface of gram-negative bacteria but can also recognize LPS-like structures on apoptotic cells. C1q and collectins are other PRRs which could potentially recognize both PAMPs and ACAMPs structures. It is necessary to additionally use the unique recognition pathways for distinguishing the two cases (for example, the Toll-like receptors signalling directs the proinflammatory response triggered by PAMPs).
