= TMEM238 =

Identifiers
- Aliases: TMEM238, transmembrane protein 238
- External IDs: MGI: 1922935; GeneCards: TMEM238

Gene location (Human)
Chr.	Chromosome 19 (human)
Band	19q13.42	Start	55,379,244 bp
Band	19q13.42	End	55,384,292 bp

Gene location (Mouse)
Chr.	Chromosome 7 (mouse)
Band	7|7 A1	Start	4,787,556 bp
Band	7|7 A1	End	4,792,655 bp
RNA expression pattern
Bgee	Human / Mouse (ortholog); Top expressed in: mucosa of transverse colon; olfactory zone of nasal mucosa; body of pancreas; duodenum; right lobe of liver; minor salivary glands; skin of abdomen; human kidney; left lobe of thyroid gland; right lobe of thyroid gland / Top expressed in: epithelium of stomach; parotid gland; lacrimal gland; right kidney; ileum; left lobe of liver; jejunum; embryo; vestibular membrane of cochlear duct; transitional epithelium of urinary bladder; More reference expression data
BioGPS	n/a
Orthologs
Databases	NCBI: entry; OMA: entry
Species	Human	Mouse
Entrez	388564	664968
Ensembl	ENSG00000233493	ENSMUSG00000030431
UniProt	C9JI98	A9JSM3
RefSeq (mRNA)	NM_001190764	NM_029384
RefSeq (protein)	NP_001177693	NP_083660
Location (UCSC)	Chr 19: 55.38 – 55.38 Mb	Chr 7: 4.79 – 4.79 Mb
PubMed search
- Wikidata
View/Edit Human	View/Edit Mouse

Transmembrane protein 238 is a transmembrane protein that in humans is encoded by the TMEM238 gene. The Homo sapiens TMEM238 gene is related to Bardet-Biedl Syndrome 2 and may play a role in amino acid transport, primarily showing expression in stomach and colon tissues.

== Gene ==
=== Locus ===
TMEM238 in Homo sapiens spans 5,049 base pairs and has two exons. TMEM238 in humans is located at 19q13.42 near the end of the long arm, minus strand of the chromosome. No splice isoforms or variants are known.

The general position of TMEM238 on human chromosome 19 marked by a red line from GeneCards.

=== Gene neighborhood ===
TMEM238 is chromosomally located between the transmembrane protein 190 (TMEM190) gene and ribosomal protein L28 (RPL28) gene. TMEM190 is involved in protein self-association and hematopoietic progenitor cell differentiation. RPL28 encodes a ribosomal protein that is part of the large 60S subunit.

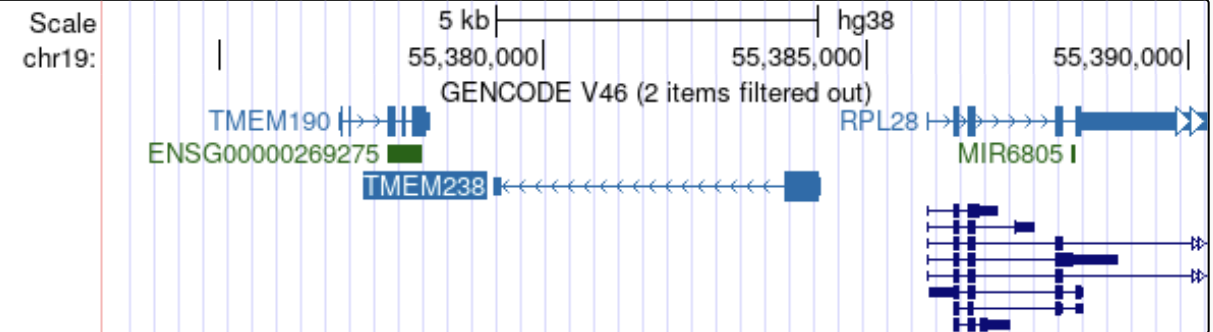
TMEM238 human gene neighbors diagram from UCSC Genome Browser.

== Protein ==
Transmembrane protein 238 is composed of 176 amino acids, weighing approximately 18.0 kDa. It has a basal isoelectric point of approximately 11.5. The protein is rich in alanine, arginine, and small amino acids, with a greater preponderance of basic amino acids.

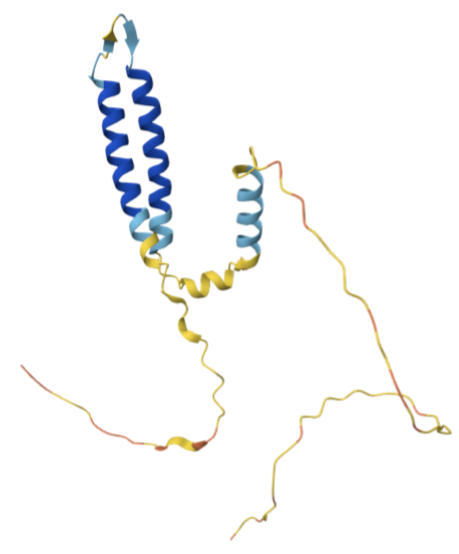
TMEM238 protein folding structuve via AlphaFold

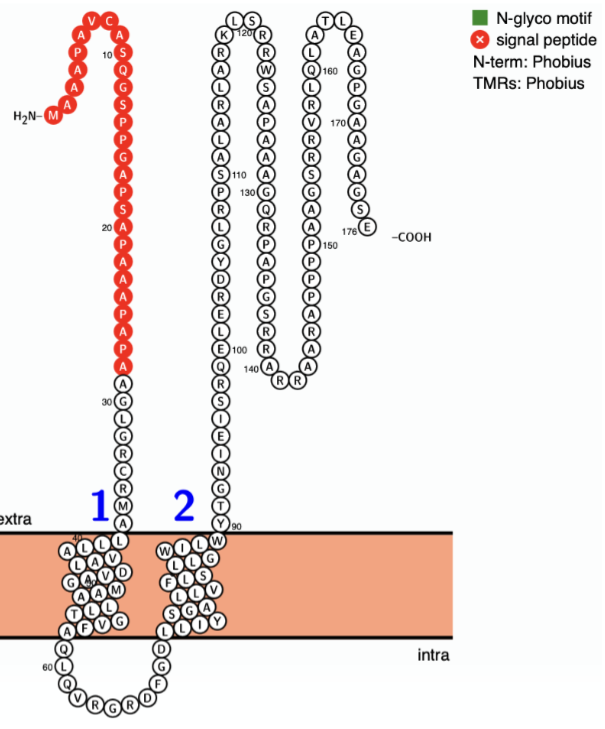
TMEM238 protein topology in the membrane visualized via Protter

=== Protein structure ===
The secondary structure of the protein has two transmembrane domains shown as dark blue alpha helices.

Protein topology within the membrane shows extracellular N- and C-terminals with a short intracellular domain between transmembrane domains.

== Gene level regulation ==
=== Expression pattern ===
TMEM238 shows higher expression in colon and stomach tissues, but variable ubiquitous expression in all other tissues.

=== In situ hybridization ===
TMEM238 gene expression in the mouse brain shows higher expression in the pons and medulla as indicated by white arrows in the sagittal plane view.

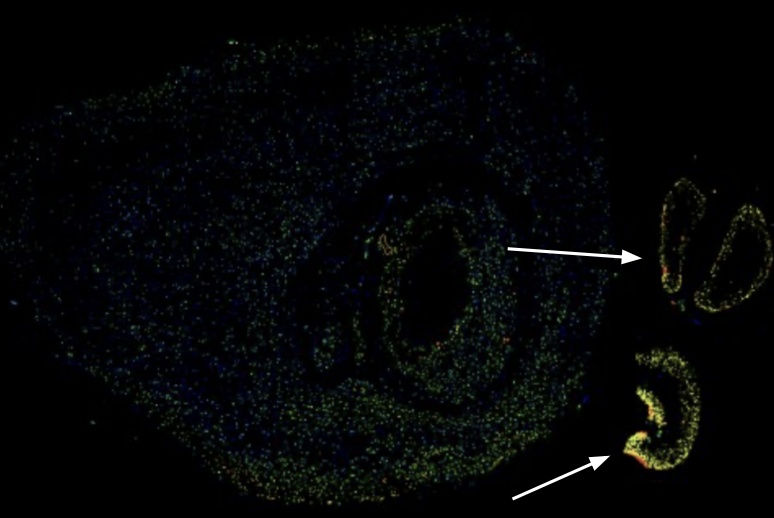
TMEM238 gene expression in the Mus musculus brain in the sagittal plane from the Allen Brain Atlas. Increased expression was found in the pons and medulla as indicated by the yellow fluorescence and white arrows.

== Protein level regulation ==
=== Subcellular localization ===
The presence of two transmembrane domains within the protein confirm its presence in the plasma membrane.

=== Lipid anchor attachment ===
The protein is not glycosylphosphatidylinositol (GPI) anchored, instead relying on hydrophobic transmembrane domains.

=== Phosphorylation ===
Six post-translational phosphorylation modification sites were found within the protein. Presence of such sites indicate that both the N-terminus and C-terminus of the protein are located in the cytosol.

== Homology ==
Orthologs can be found in vertebrates dating back to 563 million years ago from human divergence but not in any invertebrates.

TMEM238 Ortholog Table
Taxonomic Class	Genus and Species	Common name	Date of Divergence from Humans (MYA)	Accession number	Sequence length	Sequence identity	Sequence similarity
Mammalia	Homo sapiens	Human	0	NP_001177693.1	176	100.0	100.0
Mammalia	Mus musculus	Rodentia	87	NP_083660.1	176	85.2	86.9
Mammalia	Eschrichtius robustus	Gray Whale	94	XP_068384946.1	178	87.1	91.0
Mammalia	Trichosurus vulpecula	Common Brushtail Possum	160	XP_036599039.1	168	65.8	70.7
Reptilia	Alligator mississippiensis	American Alligator	319	XP_019356415.1	131	48.9	55.0
Reptilia	Malaclemys terrapin pileata	Mississippi Diamondback Terrapin Turtle	319	XP_053865811.1	123	43.2	54.0
Reptilia	Pantherophis guttatus	Corn Snake	319	XP_034292043.1	158	33.0	42.0
Aves	Gallus gallus	Red Junglefowl Chicken	319	XP_040503607.1	135	33.3	41.4
Aves	Sylvia atricapilla	Eurasian Blackcap Bird	319	XP_066185702.1	131	33.0	39.5
Amphibia	Xenopus laevis	African Clawed Frog	352	XP_018083581.1	160	39.7	51.3
Amphibia	Bufotes viridis	European Green Toad	352	CAK8623525.1	137	36.5	48.6
Dipnoi	Protopterus annectens	West African Lungfish	408	XP_043937488.1	138	36.4	50.0
Coelacanthi	Latimeria chalumnae	West Indian Ocean Coelacanth	415	XP_006010124.1	143	41.1	53.3
Ray-Finned Fishes	Nothobranchius furzeri	Turquoise Killifish	429	XP_015830691.2	104	29.0	40.3
Ray-Finned Fishes	Danio rerio	Zebrafish	429	NP_001076543.1	105	26.4	37.4
Ray-Finned Fishes	Nerophis ophidion	Straightnose Pipefish	429	XP_061764902.1	191	26.1	42.4
Ray-Finned Fishes	Hippocampus zosterae	Dwarf Seahorse	429	XP_051927990.1	185	25.6	33.8
Cartilaginous Fishes	Callorhinchus milii	Australian Ghostshark	462	XP_007905786.1	144	38.8	52.5
Cartilaginous Fishes	Chiloscyllium plagiosum	Whitespotted Bamboo Shark	462	XP_043571155.1	155	27.2	37.6
Hyperoartia	Lethenteron reissneri	Asiatic Brook Lamprey	563	XP_061425829.1	210	27.3	34.3
Hyperoartia	Petromyzon marinus	Sea Lamprey	563	XP_032832039.1	158	25.3	38.7

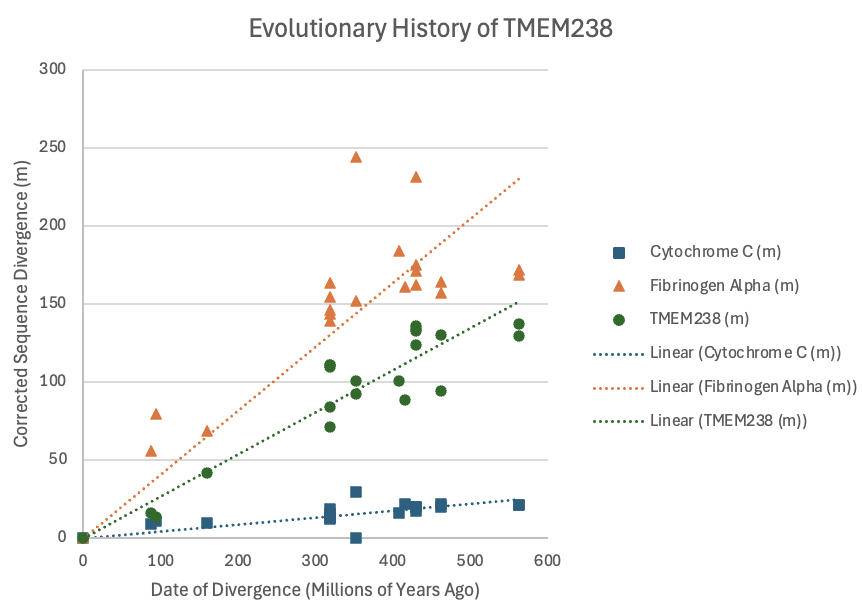
TMEM238 evolutionary history in humans compared to the rates of cytochrome c and fibrinogen alpha

=== Evolutionary history ===
TMEM238 is evolving moderately quickly in history with a rate faster than cytochrome c but slower than fibrinogen alpha.

=== Function and biochemistry ===
The TMEM238 protein is predicted to be an integral component of the membrane and play a role in amino acid transport.

=== Interacting proteins ===
Several proteins interact with transmembrane protein 238, all located in the cell membrane.

Protein Interactions
Abbreviated Name	Full Name	Statistical Measures	Compartment of the Cell	Protein Function
KRTCAP3	Keratinocyte Associated Protein 3	0.4504	Cell Membrane	Adiposity
TMEM30B	Transmembrane Protein 30B	0.4512	Cell Membrane, Golgi, ER	Aminophospholipid transport, regulate protein exit from ER
TMEM223	Transmembrane Protein 223	0.524	Cell Membrane	Nervous System Development
CATSPERB	Cation Channel Sperm-Associated Protein Subunit Beta	0.573	Cell Membrane, Cilium	Sperm cell hyperactivation, motility, spermatogenesis

== Clinical significance ==
The Homo sapiens TMEM238 gene is related to Bardet-Biedl Syndrome 2, a ciliopathic human genetic disorder.

Expression of the TMEM238 protein was also shown to increase in several disease states including asthma and low invasive breast cancers as found in various microarray experiments. DNA methylation in TMEM238 was identified as a mediator in the developmental BPA exposure and female-specific body weight phenotypes in mice. Upregulation of the TMEM238 gene is present in POEMS syndrome.
