= Haloacid dehydrogenase superfamily =

Hydrolase_3
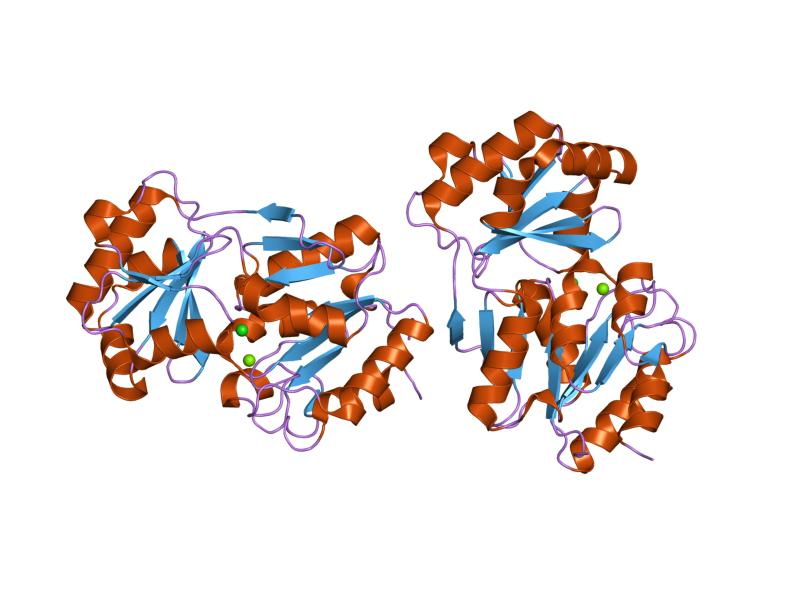
- crystal structure of had-like phosphatase yida from e. coli

Identifiers
- Symbol: Hydrolase_3
- Pfam: PF08282
- Pfam clan: CL0137
- ECOD: 2006.1.1
Available protein structures:
- PDB: PF08282 (ECOD; PDBsum)
- AlphaFold: PF08282

The haloacid dehydrogenase superfamily (HAD superfamily) is a superfamily of enzymes that include phosphatases, phosphonatases, P-type ATPases, beta-phosphoglucomutases, phosphomannomutases, and dehalogenases, and are involved in a variety of cellular processes ranging from amino acid biosynthesis to detoxification.

== Examples ==
A HAD domain is found in several distinct proteins including:

- Phospholipid-translocating ATPase EC 3.6.3.1, a putative lipid-flipping enzyme involved in cold tolerance in Arabidopsis
- 3-deoxy-D-manno-octulosonate (KDO) 8-phosphate phosphatase (EC 3.1.3.45), which catalyses the final step in the biosynthesis of KDO - a component of lipopolysaccharide in Gram-negative bacteria
- Mannosyl-3-phosphoglycerate phosphatase (EC 3.1.3.70), which hydrolyses mannosyl-3-phosphoglycerate to form the osmolyte mannosylglycerate
- Phosphoglycolate phosphatase (EC 3.1.3.18), which catalyses the dephosphorylation of 2-phosphoglycolate
- 5´-Nucleotidase (EC 3.1.3.5) which either catalyzes the hydrolysis of IMP. or IMP and GMP
- Hypothetical proteins

Human genes encoding proteins that contain this domain include:

- ATP8B3, ATP8B4, ATP10A, ATP10B, ATP10D
