= Factor I =

Factor I may refer to:

- Complement factor I, a protein of the complement system
- Fibrinogen, a protein involved in blood coagulation
- Factor 1, a component of the Psychopathy Checklist
