= Eat-me signals =

Cells release eat-signals onto their surface to induce phagocytes to eat them

Eat-me signals are molecules exposed on the surface of a cell to induce phagocytes to phagocytose (eat) that cell. Currently known eat-me signals include: phosphatidylserine, oxidized phospholipids, sugar residues (such as galactose), deoxyribonucleic acid (DNA), calreticulin, annexin A1, histones and pentraxin-3 (PTX3).

The most well characterised eat-me signal is the phospholipid phosphatidylserine. Healthy cells do not expose phosphatidylserine on their surface, whereas dead, dying, infected, injured and some activated cells expose phosphatidylserine on their surface in order to induce phagocytes to phagocytose them. Most glycoproteins and glycolipids on the surface of our cells have short sugar chains that terminate in sialic acid residues, which inhibit phagocytosis, but removal of these residues reveals galactose residues (and subsequently N-acetylglucosamine and mannose residues) that can bind opsonins or directly activate phagocytic receptors. Calreticulin, annexin A1, histones, pentraxin-3 and DNA may be released by (and onto the surface of) dying cells to encourage phagocytes to eat these cells, thereby acting as self-opsonins. Eat-me signals, or the opsonins that bind them, are recognised by phagocytic receptors on phagocytes, inducing engulfment of the cell exposing the eat-me signal.

== Function ==
Phosphatidylserine (PtdSer) and Phosphatidylethanolamine (PtdEtn) are two aminophospholipids predominantly located within the cytoplasmic inner membrane leaflet. During apoptosis, they translocate to the outer membrane, signaling for engulfment. ATP-dependent flippases maintain lipid asymmetry within the plasma membrane via the translocation of PtdSer and PtdEtn from the outer to inner leaflet during normal conditions, while scramblases facilitate their exposure by translocating from the inner to outer leaflet during apoptosis. Aminophospholipid PtdSer plays a crucial role in maintaining proper immune function due to its anti-inflammatory properties. Chaperone Protein CDC50 ensures proper localization of P4-ATPases to maintain proper lipid asymmetry while under normal conditions. However, during apoptosis, these chaperones are downregulated allowing for scramblases to facilitate the exposure of PtdSer and PtdEtn. Through the coordination of lipids, flippases, scramblases, and their associated chaperones, the exposure of eat-me signals is highly regulated, ensuring the proper identification and engulfment of apoptotic cells. Recent studies have shown that inhibition of this pathway disrupts the identification and engulfment process of apoptotic cells, contributing to cancer progression. While PtdSer exposure is regarded as one of the most common eat-me signals, its sole exposure might not be sufficient to upregulate phagocytosis. In certain cases, PtdSer must be expressed alongside other eat-me signals in order to be effectively recognized by phagocytes. Recent research identified calreticulin to be the second ligand required for activation of phagocytosis, working in conjunction with PtdSer. Other studies have found that a threshold level of PtdSer expression is required in order for activation of phagocytosis to occur, indicating a possible role in non-apoptotic pathways. However, a specific quantitative value for this threshold has yet to be determined.

== Role in cancer research ==
CD47 is a phagocytosis inhibitor that is often overexpressed in cancer cells, particularly in gastrointestinal (GI) cancer. The binding of CD47 to SIRPα triggers the phosphorylation of tyrosine residues on SIRPα, inhibiting phagocytosis. Overexpression of the CD47-SIRPα pathway leads to the failed detection and removal of apoptotic cells resulting in cellular damage, contributing to cancer progression. Calreticulin (CRT) is a protein that promotes phagocytosis in cancer cells via the binding to low-density lipoprotein receptor-related protein (LRP) on the phagocytes. However, when CD47 is overexpressed, inhibition of CRT mediated phagocytosis can occur due to activation of the CD47-SIRPα pathway. Regulation of CD47 inhibition and CRT promotion is key in mediating phagocytosis ensuring proper identification and engulfment and maintaining proper immune function. The CD47-SIRPα pathway is a prominent pathway seen in malignant formation, specifically in the GI tract, and is a potential target for GI cancer research.

== Identification ==
Engulfment receptors found on phagocytes are crucial for the initiating engulfment of apoptotic cells as well as their proper identification. A variety of engulfment receptors are observed, due to the low specificity of each receptor thus requiring multiple means of recognition. The exposure of specific eat-me signals recruitment and activation of specific engulfment receptors during phagocytosis. Recognition of "eat-me" signals relies primarily on the formation of ligand-receptor complexes. This identification and specificity of ligand-receptors is crucial for proper identification and engulfment of apoptotic cells, ensuring proper immune function.

== See also ==
- Find-me signals
