= Phospholipid-transporting ATPase VA =

Protein-coding gene in the species Homo sapiens

ATP10A

Identifiers
- Aliases: ATP10A, ATP10C, ATPVA, ATPVC, ATPase phospholipid transporting 10A (putative)
- External IDs: OMIM: 605855; MGI: 1330809; GeneCards: ATP10A
Enzyme activity
EC #	BRENDA	ExPASy	KEGG	MetaCyc
7.6.2.1	↗	↗	↗	↗

Gene location (Human)
Chr.	Chromosome 15 (human)
Band	15q12	Start	25,677,273 bp
Band	15q12	End	25,865,184 bp

Gene location (Mouse)
Chr.	Chromosome 7 (mouse)
Band	7|7 B5	Start	58,305,914 bp
Band	7|7 B5	End	58,479,168 bp
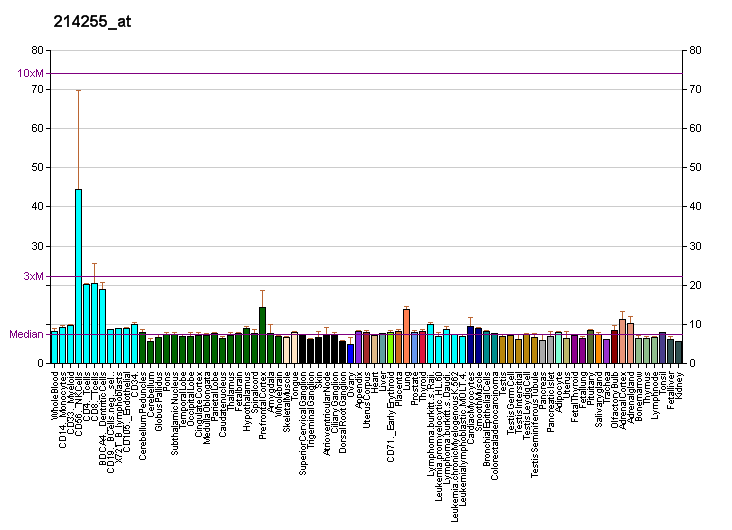

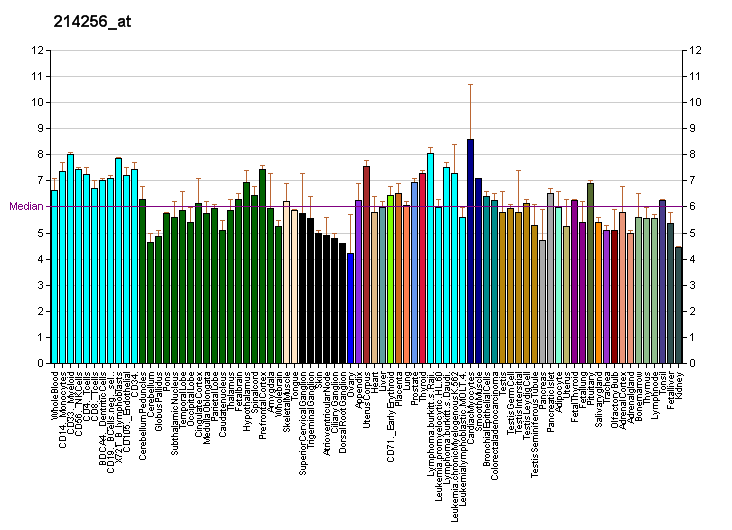
RNA expression pattern
Bgee	Human / Mouse (ortholog); Top expressed in: endothelial cell; Descending thoracic aorta; ascending aorta; tibial arteries; dorsal motor nucleus of vagus nerve; inferior olivary nucleus; glomerulus; metanephric glomerulus; left coronary artery; right coronary artery / Top expressed in: cumulus cell; spermatid; gastrula; adrenal gland; thymus; internal carotid artery; seminiferous tubule; decidua; endothelial cell of lymphatic vessel; substantia nigra; More reference expression data
BioGPS	More reference expression data
Gene ontology
Molecular function	nucleotide binding; protein binding; hydrolase activity; ATP binding; magnesium ion binding; metal ion binding; ATPase-coupled intramembrane lipid transporter activity
Cellular component	integral component of membrane; plasma membrane; endoplasmic reticulum; endoplasmic reticulum membrane; membrane
Biological process	phospholipid transport; ion transmembrane transport; lipid transport; phospholipid translocation; regulation of cell shape
Sources:Amigo / QuickGO
Orthologs
Databases	NCBI: entry; OMA: entry
Species	Human	Mouse
Entrez	57194	11982
Ensembl	ENSG00000206190	ENSMUSG00000025324
UniProt	O60312	O54827
RefSeq (mRNA)	NM_024490	NM_009728
RefSeq (protein)	NP_077816	NP_033858
Location (UCSC)	Chr 15: 25.68 – 25.87 Mb	Chr 7: 58.31 – 58.48 Mb
PubMed search
- Wikidata
View/Edit Human	View/Edit Mouse

Phospholipid-transporting ATPase VA also known as ATPase class V type 10A or aminophospholipid translocase VA is an enzyme that in humans is encoded by the ATP10A gene.

== Function ==
The protein encoded by ATP10A belongs to the family of P-type cation transport ATPases, and to the subfamily of aminophospholipid-transporting ATPases. The aminophospholipid translocases transport phosphatidylserine and phosphatidylethanolamine from one side of a bilayer to another. This gene is maternally expressed. It maps within the most common interval of deletion responsible for Angelman syndrome, also known as 'happy puppet syndrome'.

== See also ==
- Haloacid dehydrogenase superfamily
