= Find-me signals =

Cells destined for apoptosis release molecules referred to as find-me signals. These signal molecules are used to attract phagocytes which engulf and eliminate damaged cells. Find-me signals are typically released by the apoptotic cells while the cell membrane remains intact. This ensures that the phagocytic cells are able to remove the dying cells before their membranes are compromised. A leaky membrane leads to secondary necrosis which may cause additional inflammation, therefore, it is best to remove dying cells before this occurs. One cell is capable of releasing multiple find-me signals. Should a cell lack the ability to release its find-me signal, other cells may release additional find-me signals to overcome the discrepancy.

Inflammation can be suppressed by find-me signals during cell clearance. A phagocyte may also be able to engulf more material or enhance its ability to engulf materials when stimulated by find-me signals.

A wide range of molecules, from cellular lipids, proteins, peptides, to nucleotides, act as find-me signals.

== History ==
The correlation between the early stages of cell death and the removal of apoptotic cells was first studied in C. elegans. Mutants that could not carry out normal caspase-mediated apoptosis were used to demonstrate that cells in the beginning stages of death were still efficiently recognized and removed by phagocytes. This occurred because the engulfment machinery of the phagocytes was still functioning normally even though the apoptotic process in the dying cell was disrupted.

A study done in 2003 showed the breast cancer cells release find me signals known as lysophosphatidylcholine. This research brought the concept of find-me signals to the fore front of cell clearance research and introduced the idea that dying cells release signals that flow throughout the body's tissues in order to alert and recruit monocytes to their location.

== Chemicals that act as find-me signals ==
Known types of find-me signals include:

- Lipids:
  - lysophosphatidylcholine (lysoPC)
  - sphingosine-1-phosphate (S1P)
- Proteins and peptides:
  - fractalkine (CX3CL1)
  - interleukin-8 (IL-8)
  - complement components C3a and C5a
  - split tyrosyl tRNA synthetase (mini TyrRS)
  - dimerized ribosomal protein S19 (RP S19)
  - endothelial monocyte-activating polypeptide II (EMAP II)
  - Formyl peptides, especially N-formylmethionine-leucyl-phenylalanine, fMLP)
- Nucleotides: adenosine triphosphate (ATP), adenosine diphosphate (ADP), uridine triphosphate (UTP) and uridine diphosphate (UDP).

All of these molecules are linked to monocyte or macrophage recruitment towards dying cells. The receptor on the monocyte or other phagocyte for ATP and UTP signals has been shown to be P2Y2 in vivo. The receptor on the monocyte or other phagocyte for the CX3CL1 signal has been shown to be CX3CR1 in vivo. The roles of the S1P and LPC signals remained to be established through a model in vivo.

=== Lipids ===
==== Lysophosphatidylcholine (LPC) ====
Identified in breast cancer cells, this find-me signals is released by MCF-7 cells to attract the THP-1 monocytes. Other cells and different methods of apoptosis may be able to release LPC, but MCF-7 cells have been the most thoroughly studied.

The enzyme calcium-independent phospholipase A2 (iPLA2) is most likely responsible for the apoptotic cell releasing LPC as it is dying. The amount of LPC released is small, so it is unclear how it is able to set up a concentration gradient in the serum or plasma in order to attract phagocytes to their location. High concentrations of LPC cause lysis of many cells in its vicinity. LPC may be present in a different chemical from rather than its native form when released by an apoptotic cell. It may bind to components of the serum, making it unavailable to be modified or taken into other tissues. LPC may also be able to function with other soluble molecules.

The receptor on the phagocyte that is thought to be linked to LPC is G2A, but it has not been confirmed. The role of LPC as a find-me signal has also not been characterized in vivo.

==== Sphingosine 1-phosphate (S1P) ====
It has been suggested that the induction of apoptosis results in increased expression of S1P kinase 1 (SphK1). The increased presence of SphK1 is linked to the creation of S1P, which then recruits macrophages to the immediate area surrounding apoptotic cells. It has also been suggested that S1P kinase 2 (SphK2) is a target of caspase 1, and that a cleaved fragment of SphK2 is what is released from dying cells into the surrounding extracellular space where it is transformed into S1P. All of the studies thus far characterizing S1P have been done in vitro, and the role or S1P in recruiting phagocytes to apoptotic cells in vivo has not been determined. Staurosine-induced cell death has been shown to influence caspase-1 to initiate the cleavage of SphK2. In other forms of apoptosis, caspase-1 is not normally induced, meaning the formation of S1P needs to be further studied.

S1P can be recognized by the G protein-coupled receptors S1P1 through S1P5. Which one of these receptors is relevant in the recruitment of phagocytes to apoptotic cells is not yet known.

Sphingosine kinase 1 and sphingosine kinase 2 have been linked to S1P generation during apoptosis through different pathways. The level of SphK1 is increased during apoptosis while caspases cleave SphK2.

=== CX3CL1 ===
CX3CL1 is a soluble fragment of fractalkine protein that serves as a find-me signal for monocytes. A soluble fragment of fractalkine that is usually on the plasma membrane as an intercellular adhesion molecule is sent out as a 60 kDa fragment during apoptosis as a find me signal. CX3CL1 release is dependent upon caspase indirectly. CX3CL1 could also be released as part of microparticles from the beginning stages of apoptotic death of Burkitt Lymphoma cells.

The receptors on monocytes that are able to detect the presence of CX3CL1 are CX3R1 receptors, as shown in both in vivo and in vitro studies.

=== Nucleotides: ATP and UTP ===
These were the most recent find me signals to be characterized as components of the supernatant of apoptotic cells. Studies were able to show that the controlled release of the nucleotides ATP and UTP from cells in the beginning stages of apoptosis can potentially attract monocytes in vivo and in vitro. This has been observed in Jurkat cells (primary thymocytes), MCF-7 cells, and lung epithelial cells. Release is dependent upon caspase activity.

Less than 2% of ATP released from the beginning stages of cell death is released when the dying cell's plasma membrane is still intact. The released ATP preferentially attracts phagocytes through chemotaxis, rather than random migration through chemokineses.

The receptors on monocytes that are able to sense the release of nucleotides are in the P2Y family of nucleotide receptors. Monocytic P2Y2 has been shown to be able to recognize nucleotides in vitro and in genetically modified mice.

Nucleotides are often degraded by nucleotide triphosphatases (NTPases) when they are in the extracellular space. Only a small amount of ATP is released during find me signaling, so it is unclear how the nucleotide avoids degradation by NTPases in order to establish a gradient used to signal clearing by monocytes. NTPases may serve as regulators in various tissues in order to control how far the nucleotide signal can travel.

The signaling pathway within the monocyte downstream of P2Y receptor activation is still unknown.

=== Others ===
The ribosomal protein S19 has been suggested as a possible find me signal. Apoptosis causes a dimerization of S19, inducing a conformation change that allows it to bind to the C5a receptor on monocytes. Research suggests that S19 is released during the late to final stages of apoptosis.

EMAPII, a fragment of tyrosyl tRNA synthetase, has also been shown to attract monocytes. This molecule has inflammatory properties, meaning it is capable of attracting and activating neutrophils.

== In apoptosis ==
=== Background ===
Humans turn over billions of cells as a part of normal bodily processes every day, which correlates with about 1 million cells being replaced per second. The ultimate goal of the body's intrinsic cell death mechanisms is to efficiently and asymptomatically clear dying cells. There are many reasons as to why the body needs to get rid of non diseased and diseased cells.

As a part of the cell's natural division process, excess cells may be generated during normal growth, development, or tissue repair after illness or an injury. Only a fraction of these new cells will stay and become mature, while the rest will die and be cleared by the body's immune system.

Cells may also need to be removed because they are too old or become damaged over time. Cell damage can occur through environmental factors such as air pollution, UV radiation from the sun, or physical injury.

In most cases, the cells that are dying are recognized by phagocytes through find-me signals and removed. Quick and efficient clearing of apoptotic cells is crucial to prevent secondary necrosis of dying cells and to avoid autoantigens causing immune responses. Find-me signals alert the presence of apoptotic cells to phagocytes when they are in the beginning states of dying. The phagocytes are able to use the find-me signals to locate the dying cell.

Find-me signals set up a gradient within the tissue they are in to attract phagocytes to their location. The phagocytes migrate to the dying cell through the use of their receptors responding to the find-me signals initiating a signaling pathway within, causing them to move to the proximity of the cell emitting those signals.

If the body's immune system, or more specifically phagocytes, fail to clear dying cells in the body, symptoms such as chronic inflammation, autoimmune disorders, and developmental abnormalities have been shown to occur. As long as the engulfment process is functioning and efficient, uncleared apoptotic cells go unnoticed in the body and do not cause any long-term symptoms. If this process is disrupted in any way, the accumulation of secondary necrotic cells in tissues of the body can occur. This is associated with autoimmune disorders, causing the immune system to attack self-antigens on the uncleared cells.

=== Release from dying cells ===
The main function of a find-me signal is to be released while a cell undergoing apoptosis is still intact in order to attract phagocytes to come and clear the dying cell before secondary necrosis can occur. This suggests that the initiation of apoptosis may be coupled with the release of find me signals from the dying cells.

As of now, it is unknown how LPC is released from apoptotic cells.

S1P generation involved caspase-1-dependent release of sphingosine kinase 2 (SphK2) fragments.

CX3CL1 release is mediated through the release of a 60 kDa microparticle fragment of fractalkine from the beginning stages of Burkitt Lymphoma cell apoptosis.

Nucleotide release is one of the better defined find me signal release mechanisms. They are released through a pannexin family channel known as PANX1. PANX1 is a four pass transmembrane protein that forms large pores in the plasma membrane of a cell, allowing molecules up to 1 kDa in size to pass through. The nucleotides are detected by P2Y2 on monocytes, which causes them to migrate to the location of the apoptotic cell.

=== Engulfment and clearance of apoptotic cells by phagocytes ===
Phagocytes are able to sense the find-me signals presented by an apoptotic cell during the beginning stages of cell death. They sense the find-me signal gradient and migrate to the vicinity of the signaling cell. Using the presented find-me signal along with the "eat-me" signal also exposed by the apoptotic cell, the phagocyte is able to recognize the dying cell and engulf it.

Phagocytes contribute to the "final stages" of cell death by apoptosis. They are often already nearby a dying cell and do not have to travel far in order to engulf and clear it. In most mammalian systems, however, this is not the case. In the human thymus, for example, a dying thymocyte is likely to be engulfed by a healthy neighboring thymocyte, and a macrophage or dendritic cell that resides in the thymus is likely to carry out clearance of the corpse. In this case, a dying cell needs to be able to send out an advertisement of sorts to declare its state of death in order to recruit phagocytes to its location. Phagocytic cells use the soluble find-me signals released by the apoptotic signals to do this. Phagocytes detect the gradient set up by the find-me signals presented by the dying cell in order to navigate to their location.

Steps in the engulfment and clearance of apoptotic cells by phagocytes:

1. Phagocytes need to be in the vicinity of the cells presenting find-me signals. The phagocytes use the find-me signals to locate these cells and move to their location.
2. The phagocytes interact with the dying cells through the presenting eat-me signals through specific eat-me signal receptors on the phagocytic cell.
3. The phagocyte will engulf the eat-me signal presenting cell through induced signaling of engulfment receptors and by the reorganization of the phagocytic cell's cytoskeleton.
4. The components of the dying cell are processed by the phagocytes within their lysosomes.

== Non-apoptotic roles ==
Find me signals may also play a role in phagocytic activity of cell in the direct vicinity of cells undergoing apoptosis. This phenomenon allows neighboring cells adjacent to the apoptotic cell sending out the find me signal to be engulfed without going through the trouble of releasing find me signals of their own.

Find me signals could possibly play a role in priming phagocytes to enhance their phagocytic capacity. In addition, they may also be able to enhance production of certain bridging molecules created by macrophages.

== See also ==
- Eat-me signals
