= Autophagic cell death =

Autophagic cell death (ACD) is a controversial form of programmed cell death that is morphologically distinct from apoptosis and necrosis. While autophagy is generally considered a cellular survival mechanism, ACD occurs when excessive or dysregulated autophagy leads to the cell's demise. This type of cell death is characterized by the large-scale accumulation of autophagosomes, giving the cell a vacuolated appearance. However, the exact mechanisms and circumstances under which autophagy transitions from a protective process to a lethal one remain subjects of ongoing debate.
