= Pseudoapoptosis =

Cellular state

Pseudoapoptosis can be defined from multiple viewpoints, with an underlying premise of the differences in cellular processes and states relating to apoptosis. Pseudoapoptosis can be referred to as an apoptotic-like cellular state that can be readily reversed, or as a process that induces rapid apoptosis through the introduction of drugs such as bleomycin.

Pseudoapoptosis has been used to define a cellular state closely resembling the initial stages of apoptosis, but asserts a readily reversible state of which a cell can resume normal cellular function. Chemical and morphological changes a cell may undergo associated with pseudoapoptosis include blebbing, plasma membrane lipid asymmetry, cytoskeleton alterations, changes in mitochondrial function, and increased concentration of cytosolic calcium. Regardless of these cellular alterations, pseudoapoptotic cells reverse these changes to resume normal cellular process.

Pseudoapoptosis has also been used in some instances when describing an accelerated, drug induced apoptotic pathway by bleomycin. Cell death occurs as it would in apoptosis, but certain apoptotic mechanisms are not utilized when in the presence of bleomycin.

== Bleomycin ==
Bleomycin (BLM) is a cytotoxic, anticancerous drug that catalyzes double-stranded breaks (DSB) and single-stranded breaks (SSB) along DNA molecules. BLM has four distinguishable molecular components that determine function, including a DNA-binding region, metal binding domain, linker region, and a carbohydrate moiety. The metal binding domain associates with metals such as iron, cobalt, and zinc, each provides the basis of selectivity towards interaction with specific regions of DNA for catalytic cleavage. It is believed that the catalytic activity of BLM is carried out by associating with DNA molecules in linker regions between nucleosomes. Specific nucleotide sequences within the minor groove of a DNA molecule are a primary target as a catalytic site.

At appropriate dosages, BLM generates morphological changes resembling typical apoptotic events, such as membrane blebbing and altered mitochondrial functioning. Degradation of DNA is also induced without the presence or assistance of specific endonuclease or protease that are involved under classic apoptotic conditions, which defines the usage of this form of pseudoapoptosis. The relative dose administered determines the extent to which DNA fragmentation occurs. In the presence of large BLM concentrations, pseudoapoptosis is observed as rapid DNA fragmentation occurs, resulting in cell death in the absence of typical apoptotic components such as specific endonucleases and proteases. Experimental evidence has suggested that every BLM molecule induces an average of 8 to 10 DNA strand breaks. An average ratio of 6 single-stranded breaks are generated for every double-stranded break. These numbers are dependent upon the form of BLM taken into consideration as deglyco-bleomycin has been found to be 100 times less toxic than wild-type BLM. Other forms of BLM forming complexes with various metals has suggested other variability when inducing pseudoapoptosis.

== ATP-gated P2X7 receptors ==
Studies have shown to induce apoptotic-like cellular states through the activation of ATP-gated P2X7 receptors, but under certain conditions these changes are reversed and normal cellular functions continue. This process has also been used to define pseudoapoptosis.

Antigen-presenting cells contain membrane bound P2X7 receptors which are involved in acute inflammatory responses. P2X purinergic receptors are ATP-gated ion channels that become activated in the presence of extracellular adenosine triphosphate (ATP). Prolonged exposure to extracellular ATP can generate or couple to a variety of cellular responses, including cell fusion, cell proliferation, release of pro-inflammatory cytokines, and bone formation.

When pertaining to apoptosis, prolonged activation of P2X7 receptors can stimulate stress responses resulting in activated kinases responsible for inducing morphological and chemical changes, leading to apoptotic events and subsequent cellular death. Experimental deduction has shown when cells are briefly exposed to high extracellular ATP on the order of seconds to minutes, pseudoapoptotic events will occur. Apoptotic events such as membrane blebbing, phosphatidylserine flips (exposure to extracellular space), mitochondrial swelling, and microvesicle shedding are present, but cellular death does not occur. All of these events have proven to be fully reversible. Sustained activation for a longer period of time leads to further mitochondrial swelling, resulting in the release of cytochrome c, which initiates a cascade of apoptotic events leading to cellular death.

- Membrane blebbing can be attributed to two separate pathways.
  - Calcium independent
    - RhoA/ROCK1 pathway
  - Calcium Dependent
    - Rapid and reversible. Associated with extracellular phosphatidylserine exposure, membrane blebbing, with no release of cytochrome c.
