= Nemosis =

Nemosis is a process of cell activation and death in human fibroblasts. Initially discovered as programmed necrosis, the name nemosis, is a derivative from the Goddess Nemesis in Greek mythology. This name was adopted for fibroblast activation based on its initiation by direct cell–cell interactions as opposed to preference for extracellular matrix (ECM) contacts. Contacts between normal diploid fibroblasts induce cell activation leading to programmed cell death, PCD. This type of PCD has features of necrosis rather than apoptosis.

Nemosis of fibroblasts, or mesenchymal cells in general, generates large amounts of mediators of inflammation, such as prostaglandins, as well as growth factors such as hepatocyte growth factor. It is thus indicated to contribute to processes like acute and chronic inflammation, and cancer. Factors secreted by nemotic fibroblasts also break down the ECM. Such factors include several matrix metalloproteinases, and plasminogen activation.
