= John Kerr (pathologist) =

Australian pathologist (1934–2024)

John Foxton Ross Kerr AO
- Born: 24 January 1934; Sydney, Australia
- Died: 4 June 2024 (aged 90)
- Education: University of Queensland (BSc, MBBS); University of London (PhD)
- Known for: Apoptosis; Necrosis
- Scientific career
- Fields: Pathology
- Workplaces: Royal Brisbane Hospital; University of Queensland

John Foxton Ross Kerr AO (24 January 1934 – 4 June 2024) was an Australian pathologist. He was the first to describe the ultrastructural changes in apoptosis, and could show that they differ significantly from the changes that occur in necrosis, another form of cell death. For the first time, he placed the roles of cell death in normal adult mammals, and in disease, into scientific focus.

== Biography ==
=== Education ===
Kerr attended Sydney Church of England Grammar School (Shore School) in North Sydney, Australia, where he was head of the school in 1950. He was third in the Leaving Certificate in New South Wales. He then studied at the University of Queensland in Brisbane, Australia. In 1955, Kerr earned a Bachelor of Science (BSc) degree, and in 1957, a Bachelor of Medicine, Bachelor of Surgery (MBBS) in which he graduated with First Class Honours and in top place. As a medical assistant, he worked at the Royal Brisbane Hospital. In 1964, he earned a PhD at the University of London.

=== Academic career ===
Starting in 1965, he taught pathology at the University of Queensland, and was made a professor in 1974. He became a professor emeritus in 1995.

Kerr, in collaboration with Andrew Wyllie and Alastair Currie, coined the term apoptosis to describe natural developmental cell death.

=== Death ===
Kerr died on 4 June 2024, at the age of 90.

== Awards and honours ==
Kerr has received numerous awards and honours:

- 1974–1992 – Fellow of the Royal College of Physicians
- 1993 – Bancroft Medal of the Australian Medical Association
- 1995 – Fred W. Stewart Award
- 1996 – Officer of the Order of Australia
- 1998 – Fellow of the Australian Academy of Science
- 2000 – Paul Ehrlich and Ludwig Darmstaedter Prize
- 2002 – Charles IV Prize of Charles University in Prague

== Notes and references ==
Bibliography

- Sternberg, S. S. (March 1996). "John Foxton Ross Kerr, M.B., PH.D., recipient of the 1995 Fred W. Stewart Award". The American Journal of Surgical Pathology. 20 (3): 380–381. doi:10.1097/00000478-199603000-00020. PMID 8772792.
- O'Rourke, M. G. E.; Ellem, K. A. O. (August 2000). "John Kerr and apoptosis". Medical Journal of Australia. 173 (11): 616–617. doi:10.5694/j.1326-5377.2000.tb139362.x. PMID 11379508. S2CID 38265127.
