= Ralph Lilley Turner =

British philologist of Indian languages

Professor Sir Ralph Lilley Turner MC

Director of the School of Oriental Studies, University of London
- In office 1937–1957

Personal details
- Born: 5 October 1888 Charlton, London, England
- Died: 22 April 1983 (aged 94)
- Relatives: Jeremy Irvine (great-grandson)
- Occupation: Philologist of Indian languages

THE GURKHA SOLDIER Bravest of the brave, most generous of the generous, never had country more faithful friends than you. Professor Sir Ralph Turner MC

Sir Ralph Lilley Turner MC (5 October 1888 – 22 April 1983) was a British philologist of Indian languages and a university administrator. He is notable for composing an Indo-Aryan comparative dictionary. He is also the author of some publications concerning the Romani language.

== Early life and education ==
Turner was born in Charlton, London, the son of Bertha (Lilley) and George S. Turner. He was educated at the Perse School and Christ's College, Cambridge.

== Career ==
In 1913, he joined the Indian Educational Service as a lecturer at Queen's College, Benares. From 1915 to 1919, he served with the 2nd battalion, 3rd Queen Alexandra's Own Gurkha Rifles in the British Indian Army during World War I, winning the Military Cross in Palestine. From 1920 to 1922, he was Professor of Indian Linguistics at Benares Hindu University.

In 1922, Turner returned to England as Professor of Sanskrit at the School of Oriental Studies at the University of London. Between 1924 and 1932, he also published several papers on Romani Studies in the Journal of the Gypsy Lore Society, including "On the position of Romani in Indo-Aryan" (1927). He was director of the school from 1937 to 1957, although he continued to occupy his chair as well until 1954. From 1939 onwards, he frequently warned the War Office that, given the possibility of war with Japan, it was essential to start training linguists immediately, but his warnings were ignored. It was only after the outbreak of war with Japan that, early in 1942, the War Office and the Board of Education put together a plan with SOAS for short courses in Japanese to meet wartime demands.

He was knighted in 1950. His magnum opus, the Comparative Dictionary of the Indo-Aryan languages was published in 1966. An Index to this work was produced in 1969 by his wife Dorothy Rivers Turner, née Goulty, who had been arranging slips for the dictionary since the first year of their marriage in about 1920. She also collaborated on Phonetic Analysis in 1971, which appeared in print a few months before her death.

The British memorial in London to the Gurkhas was unveiled by Queen Elizabeth II on 3 December 1997. The legend on the Gurkha memorial is taken from the following quotation written by Sir Ralph:

As I write these last words, my thoughts return to you who were my comrades, the stubborn and indomitable peasants of Nepal. Once more I hear the laughter with which you greeted every hardship. Once more I see you in your bivouacs or about your fires, on forced march or in the trenches, now shivering with wet and cold, now scorched by a pitiless and burning sun. Uncomplaining you endure hunger and thirst and wounds; and at the last your unwavering lines disappear into the smoke and wrath of battle. Bravest of the brave, most generous of the generous, never had country more faithful friends than you.

== Personal life ==
He was married to Dorothy Rivers Goulty, with whom he had three daughters and a son. One of his grandchildren is Professor Geoffrey L. Smith, head of the Department of Pathology at the University of Cambridge.

Another grandchild of Sir Ralph Turner is David Tee, who is the current 2026 captain of the England 70+ cricket team, having competed and won both the 2025 Ashes and 2025 World Cup in New Zealand. Earlier in his career, he had a successful few years for Hertfordshire, and toured the West Indies representing Great British colleges.

Through his daughter, Kathleen L. Turner, one of his great-grandchildren is actor Jeremy Irvine.

== Works ==
- A Comparative and Etymological Dictionary of the Nepali Language
- A Comparative Dictionary of the Indo-Aryan Languages

== Archives ==
- Papers of Ralph Turner are held by SOAS Special Collections

Academic offices
Preceded by Sir Edward Denison Ross	Director of SOAS University of London; 1937–1957	Succeeded by Sir Cyril Philips
