= Apo2.7 =

Apo2.7 is a protein confined to the mitochondrial membrane. It can be detected during early stages of apoptosis. It can be used to detect apoptosis via flow cytometry.
