= Vernonica Franklin-Tong =

Cell biologist

Noni Franklin-Tong FRS
- Born: Vernonica Elsa Tong; London
- Education: University of Birmingham
- Scientific career
- Fields: Self-incompatibility; Signalling; Cytoskeleton; Programmed cell death
- Workplaces: Umeå University; University of Edinburgh
- Thesis: The genetics of self-incompatibility in Papaver rhoeas L. (1986)
- Website: www.birmingham.ac.uk/staff/profiles/biosciences/franklin-tong-noni.aspx

Vernonica "Noni" Elsa Franklin-Tong FRS is an English plant cell biologist who is Emeritus Professor at the University of Birmingham. She is known for her studies on self-incompatibility in Papaver rhoeas. In 2021 she was elected a Fellow of the Royal Society.

== Early life and education ==
Franklin-Tong was born in London. She was an undergraduate student at the University of Birmingham, where she majored in biological sciences. She remained at Birmingham for her graduate studies, where she completed a PhD on the genetics of self-incompatibility in Papaver rhoeas in 1986.

== Research and career ==
Franklin-Tong was awarded a Biotechnology and Biological Sciences Research Council (BBSRC) advanced fellowship. In 1997, she was appointed a lecturer at the University of Birmingham, and promoted to chair in 2004. Her research investigates the cellular mechanisms involved in the regulation of the cell-cell recognition system of self-incompatibility in Papaver rhoeas. Self-incompatibility prevents inbreeding through the recognition and inhibition of a flower's own pollen, ultimately determining the reproductive success of flowering plants.

Franklin-Tong developed an in vitro bioassay that allowed for the first investigations into the cell biology of self-incompatibility, unravelling the mechanisms that underpin the rejection of pollen that is not compatible. She identified an intricate intracellular signalling network that regulates this self-incompatibility and culminates in cell death.

The pollen S-determinant (PrpS) can be functionally expressed in Arabidopsis thaliana, a model plant that is self-compatibile. When transgenic Arabidopsis thaliana pollen is exposed to recombinant Papaver rhoeas a similar response occurs to those detected in incompatible Papaver rhoeas pollen. This indicates that PrpS is a species with no self-incompatibility that diverged over one hundred million years ago.

== Selected publications ==
- W G van Doorn; E P Beers; J L Dangl; et al. (2011). "Morphological classification of plant cell deaths". Cell Death & Differentiation. 18 (8): 1241–1246. doi:10.1038/cdd.2011.36. PMC 3172093. PMID 21494263. Wikidata Q37865383.
- Vernonica E. Franklin-Tong (1999). "Signaling and the modulation of pollen tube growth". The Plant Cell. 11 (4): 727–738. doi:10.1105/tpc.11.4.727. PMID 10213789. Wikidata Q95297242.
- Jason J. Rudd; Vernonica E. Franklin-Tong (2001). "Unravelling response-specificity in Ca2+ signalling pathways in plant cells". New Phytologist. 151 (1): 7–33. doi:10.1046/j.1469-8137.2001.00173.x. PMID 33873376. Wikidata Q104903614.
- Thomas Dresselhaus; Noni Franklin-Tong (2013). "Male-female crosstalk during pollen germination, tube growth and guidance, and double fertilization". Molecular Plant. 6 (4): 1018–36. doi:10.1093/mp/sst061. PMID 23571489. Wikidata Q26829569.

== Personal life ==
Franklin-Tong was diagnosed with breast cancer in 2014.
