= Alastair Currie =

Scottish pathologist (1921–1994)

- Born: 8 August 1921; Islay, Scotland
- Died: 12 January 1994 (aged 72); Edinburgh, Scotland
- Spouse: Jeanne Clark
- Children: 5

Academic background
- Education: Glasgow High School
- Alma mater: University of Glasgow; University of Edinburgh

Sir Alastair Robert Currie (8 October 1921 – 12 January 1994) was a Scottish pathologist, who was professor of pathology, at Edinburgh University, 1972–86, and then emeritus. He was eminent in the field of cancer research and humanitarian causes.

== Life ==
He was born on the island of Islay of the western Scottish coast on 8 October 1921. He was the son of John Currie and Maggie Mactaggart. He attended Port Ellen Primary School then Bowmore High School. He was then sent to the mainland to attend Glasgow High School for his final school years, from whence he studied medicine at Glasgow University graduating MB ChB in 1944. He then studied as a postgraduate at Edinburgh University.

From 1947, he lectured in Pathology at Glasgow University. In 1959 he took a job in London with the Imperial Cancer Research Fund as Head of Pathology, beginning a lifelong connection with cancer research. In 1962 he was offered the Regius Professor chair in Pathology at Aberdeen University. His research began to concentrate on cell death. During this he did joint research with the Australian, John Kerr, and Andrew Wyllie. They called this process apoptosis, publishing their results in 1972.

Glasgow University and Aberdeen University each awarded him an honorary doctorate: LLD from Glasgow and DSc from Aberdeen.

In 1964 he was elected a member of the Harveian Society of Edinburgh. In 1964, he was also elected a Fellow of the Royal Society of Edinburgh. His proposers were George L Montgomery, James Norman Davidson, Thomas Symington and Richard H A Swain. He served as their vice-president 1988–90 and president 1991–93

He died in Edinburgh on 12 January 1994.

== Family ==
In 1949 he married Jeanne Clark, whom he had met as a fellow medical student in 1942. They had three sons and two daughters. They were predeceased by one of their children.

== Positions of note ==
- Chairman of the Medical Research Council 1976–80
- Chairman of the Cancer Research Campaign Scientific Committee 1979–83
- Vice President of the Cancer Research Campaign Scientific Committee 1988–90
- Vice Chairman of the Caledonian Research Foundation 1989–94
- Chairman of the board of governors, Beatson Institute for Cancer Research, in Glasgow 1984–91
- Chairman, Paterson Institute for Cancer Research, Manchester 1990–92
- Advisor to Canada's Scientific Advisory Council 1982–88
