= Geoffrey L. Smith =

British virologist

Geoffrey Smith FRS FMedSci FRSB
- Born: 23 July 1955 (age 70)
- Scientific career
- Thesis: Replication of the influenze virus genome (1981)
- Website: www.path.cam.ac.uk/directory/geoffrey-smith

Geoffrey Lilley Smith (born 1955) is a British virologist and medical research authority in the area of Vaccinia virus and the family of Poxviruses. Since 1 October 2011 he is head of the Department of Pathology at the University of Cambridge and a principal research fellow of the Wellcome Trust. Before that, he was head of the Department of Virology at Imperial College London.

== Education ==
Smith was educated at the Bootham School in York and completed his bachelor's degree at the University of Leeds in 1977. In 1981 he was awarded a PhD in Virology for research completed at the National Institute for Medical Research.

== Career and research ==
Between 1981 and 1984, while he was working in the United States under the National Institutes of Health, Smith developed and pioneered the use of genetically engineered live vaccines. Between 1985 and 1989 he lectured at the University of Cambridge. During 2002 Smith sequenced a strain of Camelpox showing how close it was to human Smallpox.

Prior to 2002, he was based at the Sir William Dunn School of Pathology at the University of Oxford. Between 1988 and 1992 his work was funded by the Jenner Fellowship from The Lister Institute; he became a governor of the Institute in 2003.

Smith was editor-in-chief of the Journal of General Virology up until 2008 and chairs the World Health Organization's Advisory Committee on Variola Virus Research. In 2009 Smith was elected as one of the founding members of the new European Academy of Microbiology and the following year was elected as a corresponding member of the Gesellschaft für Virologie. Until 2011 he was the head of the Department of Virology at Imperial College London. As of 2011 Smith became president of the International Union of Microbiological Societies.

Andrew H. Wyllie had been the previous holder of the head of the Department of Pathology at Cambridge until retirement in September 2011.

=== Publications ===
- Binns, Matthew M.; Smith, Geoffrey L. (27 May 1992). Recombinant Poxviruses. CRC Press. ISBN 978-0849361791.
- Smith, G. L.; Irving, W. L.; McCauley, J. W.; et al., eds. (February 2006). New Challenges to Health: The Threat of Virus Infection. Society for General Microbiology Symposia. Cambridge University Press. ISBN 978-0511141171.
- Gillespie, Stephen H.; Smith, Geoffrey L.; Osbourn, Anne, eds. (February 2006). Microbe-vector Interactions in Vector-borne Diseases. Society for General Microbiology Symposia. Cambridge University Press. ISBN 978-0511141126.
- Khan, Ali S.; Smith, Geoffrey L., eds. (December 2010). Scientific review of variola virus research, 1999–2010 (PDF) (Report). Geneva: WHO. WHO/HSE/GAR/BDP/2010.3.

== Awards and honours ==
In 2002, Smith was elected as a Fellow of the Academy of Medical Sciences. In 2003, he was elected a Fellow of the Royal Society and in 2005 was awarded the Feldburg Foundation Prize for his work on poxviruses. Since 2010, he is a founding member of the European Academy of Microbiology. In 2011 he was elected as a fellow of the Academy of Sciences Leopoldina. In June 2012 Smith was awarded the 2012 GlaxoSmithKline International Member of the Year Award by the American Society for Microbiology.

== Personal life ==
His maternal grandfather was Ralph Lilley Turner, director of the School of Oriental Studies and a philologist of Indian languages.
