= Necrotaxis =

Necrotaxis embodies a special type of chemotaxis when the chemoattractant molecules are released from necrotic or apoptotic cells. Investigations of necrotaxis proved that ability to sense substances released from dying cells is present in unicellular level (e.g. Paramecium) as well as in vertebrates (see interactions of leukocytes with corpse of dead cells). Composition of the substances inducing necrotaxis is rather complex, some of them are still obscure. However, depending on the chemical character of molecules released, necrotaxis can accumulate or repel cells, which underlines the pathophysiological significance of the phenomenon. Model experiments of necrotaxis deal with special way of killing the target cells. For this purpose laser irradiation is used frequently. Several mathematical models are also available to describe the special locomotor characteristics of this migratory response of cells.

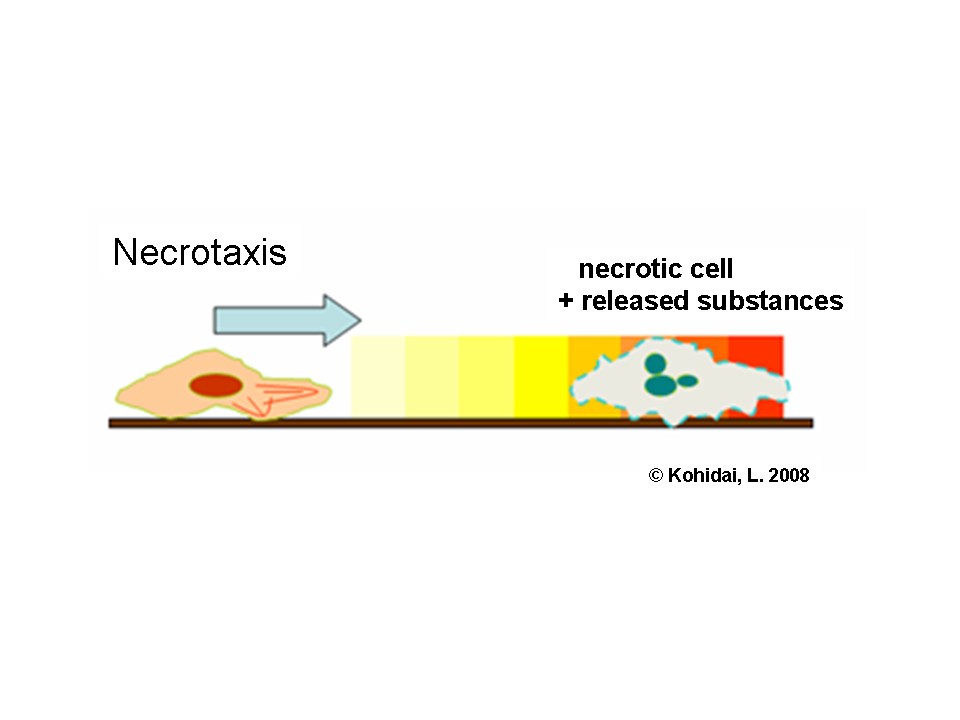
Haptotaxis
