= Andrew Wyllie (pathologist) =

Scottish pathologist (1944–2022)

Andrew David Hamilton Wyllie FMedSci FRS (24 January 1944 – 26 May 2022) was a Scottish pathologist.

== Background ==
Andrew David Hamilton Wyllie was born in Aberdeen on 24 January 1944. In 1972, while working with electron microscopes at the University of Aberdeen he realised the significance of natural cell death. He and his colleagues John Kerr and Alastair Currie called this process apoptosis, from the use of this word in an ancient Greek poem to mean "falling off" (like leaves falling from a tree). He completed postdoctoral training in Cambridge University and became Professor of Experimental Pathology at the University of Edinburgh Medical School in 1992. He left Edinburgh for a chair at Cambridge in 1998 where he continued to lecture to undergraduate medical and natural sciences students. His works have contributed to the understanding of apoptosis in health and in disease. Apoptosis is used during early development to eliminate unwanted cells; for example, those between the fingers of a developing hand. In adults, apoptosis is used to rid the body of cells that have been damaged beyond repair. Apoptosis also plays a critical role in preventing cancer. If apoptosis is for some reason prevented, it can lead to uncontrolled cell division and the subsequent development of a tumour.

After retirement, Wyllie was succeeded in his role as Head of the Department of Pathology at Cambridge by Geoffrey L. Smith in October 2011. Wyllie died after a long illness at his home in Willingham, Cambridgeshire, on 26 May 2022, aged 78.

== Career and awards ==
- University of Aberdeen – BSc, MB, ChB (1975), PhD
- 1994 – Bertner Award, MD Anderson Cancer Centre, University of Texas, USA
- 1995 – Fellow of the Royal Society
- 1998 – Hans Bloemendal Award, University of Nijmegen
- 1998 – Fellow of the Academy of Medical Sciences
- 1998 – 2011 Professor of Pathology and Head of the Department, University of Cambridge, England, and an Honorary Consultant, Addenbrooke's Hospital, Cambridge
- 1999 – Gairdner Foundation International Award
- 2001 – Scheele Award
