= Complement factor I =

Protein

CFI

Identifiers
- Aliases: CFI, AHUS3, ARMD13, C3BINA, C3b-INA, FI, IF, KAF, complement factor I
- External IDs: OMIM: 217030; MGI: 105937; GeneCards: CFI
Available structures
PDB	Ortholog search: PDBe RCSB
PDB	List of PDB id codes 2XRC
Enzyme activity
EC #	BRENDA	ExPASy	KEGG	MetaCyc
3.4.21.45	↗	↗	↗	↗

Gene location (Human)
Chr.	Chromosome 4 (human)
Band	4q25	Start	109,740,694 bp
Band	4q25	End	109,802,179 bp

Gene location (Mouse)
Chr.	Chromosome 3 (mouse)
Band	3 G3|3 59.21 cM	Start	129,629,533 bp
Band	3 G3|3 59.21 cM	End	129,668,981 bp
RNA expression pattern
Bgee	Human / Mouse (ortholog); Top expressed in: germinal epithelium; parietal pleura; right lobe of liver; gallbladder; palpebral conjunctiva; visceral pleura; kidney tubule; human kidney; right adrenal cortex; caput epididymis / Top expressed in: left lobe of liver; epithelium of stomach; pyloric antrum; gallbladder; mucous cell of stomach; fetal liver hematopoietic progenitor cell; migratory enteric neural crest cell; human fetus; endocardial cushion; yolk sac; More reference expression data
BioGPS	n/a
Gene ontology
Molecular function	peptidase activity; hydrolase activity; serine-type peptidase activity; metal ion binding; serine-type endopeptidase activity; scavenger receptor activity; protein binding
Cellular component	extracellular exosome; membrane; extracellular region; extracellular space
Biological process	complement activation, classical pathway; regulation of complement activation; receptor-mediated endocytosis; proteolysis; immune system process; innate immune response; viral process; vesicle-mediated transport; endocytosis
Sources:Amigo / QuickGO
Orthologs
Databases	NCBI: entry; OMA: entry
Species	Human	Mouse
Entrez	3426	12630
Ensembl	ENSG00000205403	ENSMUSG00000058952
UniProt	P05156; Q8WW88	Q61129
RefSeq (mRNA)	NM_000204; NM_001318057; NM_001331035	NM_007686; NM_001329552
RefSeq (protein)	NP_000195; NP_001304986; NP_001317964; NP_001362207; NP_001362208 NP_001362209; NP_001362210; NP_001362211; NP_001362212; NP_001362213; NP_001304986.1	NP_001316481; NP_031712
Location (UCSC)	Chr 4: 109.74 – 109.8 Mb	Chr 3: 129.63 – 129.67 Mb
PubMed search
- Wikidata
View/Edit Human	View/Edit Mouse

Complement factor I, also known as C3b/C4b inactivator, is a protein that in humans is encoded by the CFI gene. Complement factor I (factor I) is a protein of the complement system, first isolated in 1966 in guinea pig serum, that regulates complement activation by cleaving cell-bound or fluid phase C3b and C4b. It is a soluble glycoprotein that circulates in human blood at an average concentration of 35 μg/mL.

== Synthesis ==
The gene for Factor I in humans is located on chromosome 4. Factor I is synthesized mostly in the liver, but also in monocytes, fibroblasts, keratinocytes, and endothelial cells. When synthesized, it is a 66kDa polypeptide chain with N-linked glycans at 6 positions. Then, factor I is cleaved by furin to yield the mature factor I protein, which is a disulfide-linked dimer of heavy chain (residues 19-335, 51 kDalton) and light chain (residues 340-583, 37 kDalton). Only the mature protein is active.

== Structure ==
Factor I is a glycoprotein heterodimer consisting of a disulfide linked heavy chain and light chain.

The factor I heavy chain has four domains: an FI membrane attack complex (FIMAC) domain, CD5 domain, and low density lipoprotein receptor 1 and 2 (LDLr1 and LDLr2) domains. the heavy chain plays an inhibitory role in maintaining the enzyme inactive until it meets the complex formed by the substrate (either C3b or C4b) and a cofactor protein (Factor H, C4b-binding protein, complement receptor 1, and membrane cofactor protein). Upon binding of the enzyme to the substrate:cofactor complex, the heavy:light chain interface is disrupted, and the enzyme activated by allostery. The LDL-receptor domains contain one Calcium-binding site each.

The factor I light chain contains only the serine protease domain. This domain contains the catalytic triad His-362, Asp-411, and Ser-507, which is responsible for specific cleavage of C3b and C4b. Conventional protease inhibitors do not completely inactivate Factor I but they can do so if the enzyme is pre-incubated with its substrate: this supports the proposed rearrangement of the molecule upon binding to the substrate.

Both heavy and light chains bear Asn-linked glycans, on three distinct glycosylation sites each.

Crystal structure the crystal structure of human Factor I has been deposited as PDB: 2XRC.

== Clinical significance ==
Dysregulated factor I activity has clinical implications. Loss of function mutations in the Complement Factor I gene lead to low levels of factor I which results in increased complement activity. Factor I deficiency in turn leads to low levels of complement component 3 (C3), factor B, factor H and properdin in blood, due to unregulated activation of C3 convertase, and to low levels of IgG, due to loss of iC3b and C3dg production. In addition to the following diseases, low factor I is associated with recurrent bacterial infections in children.

=== Age-related macular degeneration ===
Research suggests that mutations in the CFI gene contribute to development of age-related macular degeneration. This contribution is thought to be due to the dysregulation of the alternative pathway, leading to increased inflammation in the eye.

=== Atypical hemolytic uremic syndrome ===
Atypical hemolytic uremic syndrome is caused by complement overactivation. Heterozygous mutations in the serine protease domain of the CFI gene account for 5-10% of cases.
