= PANX1 =

Protein-coding gene in the species Homo sapiens

Identifiers
- Aliases: PANX1, MRS1, PX1, UNQ2529, pannexin 1, OOMD7, Pannexin1
- External IDs: OMIM: 608420; MGI: 1860055; GeneCards: PANX1

Gene location (Human)
Chr.	Chromosome 11 (human)
Band	11q21	Start	94,128,841 bp
Band	11q21	End	94,181,968 bp

Gene location (Mouse)
Chr.	Chromosome 9 (mouse)
Band	9|9 A2	Start	14,913,424 bp
Band	9|9 A2	End	14,956,774 bp
RNA expression pattern
Bgee	Human / Mouse (ortholog); Top expressed in: ganglionic eminence; stromal cell of endometrium; secondary oocyte; islet of Langerhans; monocyte; ventricular zone; Achilles tendon; gastrocnemius muscle; testicle; right coronary artery / Top expressed in: lumbar spinal ganglion; tail of embryo; intestinal villus; stroma of bone marrow; genital tubercle; ganglionic eminence; Rostral migratory stream; jejunum; ventricular zone; thymus; More reference expression data
BioGPS	n/a
Gene ontology
Molecular function	transmembrane transporter binding; calcium channel activity; channel activity; scaffold protein binding; gap junction channel activity; protease binding; actin filament binding; leak channel activity; protein heterodimerization activity; actin binding; gap junction hemi-channel activity; signaling receptor binding; wide pore channel activity
Cellular component	integral component of membrane; endoplasmic reticulum membrane; cell junction; bleb; gap junction; membrane; endoplasmic reticulum; plasma membrane; protein-containing complex
Biological process	response to ATP; cation transport; ion transport; response to ischemia; calcium ion transmembrane transport; transmembrane transport; protein hexamerization; calcium ion transport; cell-cell signaling; transport
Sources:Amigo / QuickGO
Orthologs
Databases	NCBI: entry; OMA: entry
Species	Human	Mouse
Entrez	24145	55991
Ensembl	ENSG00000110218	ENSMUSG00000031934
UniProt	Q96RD7	Q9JIP4
RefSeq (mRNA)	NM_015368	NM_019482
RefSeq (protein)	NP_056183	NP_062355
Location (UCSC)	Chr 11: 94.13 – 94.18 Mb	Chr 9: 14.91 – 14.96 Mb
PubMed search
- Wikidata
View/Edit Human	View/Edit Mouse

Pannexin 1 is a protein in humans that is encoded by the PANX1 gene.

The protein encoded by this gene belongs to the innexin family. Innexin family members are the structural components of gap junctions. This protein and pannexin 2 are abundantly expressed in central nerve system (CNS) and are coexpressed in various neuronal populations. Studies in Xenopus oocytes suggest that this protein alone and in combination with pannexin 2 may form cell type-specific gap junctions with distinct properties.

== Clinical relevance ==
Truncating mutations in this gene have been shown to promote breast cancer metastasis to the lungs by allowing cancer cells to survive mechanical stretch in the microcirculation.

Disruptions of this gene have been associated to melanoma tumor progression.

Pannexin 1 is also an important component of membrane channels involved in the formation of thin plasma membrane extensions called apoptopodia and beaded apoptopodia during apoptosis.
