= 3-deoxy-manno-octulosonate-8-phosphatase =

Class of enzymes

Identifiers
- EC no.: 3.1.3.45
- CAS no.: 59088-24-3

Databases
- IntEnz: IntEnz view
- BRENDA: BRENDA entry
- ExPASy: NiceZyme view
- KEGG: KEGG entry
- MetaCyc: metabolic pathway
- PRIAM: profile
- PDB structures: RCSB PDB PDBe PDBsum
- Gene Ontology: AmiGO / QuickGO
Search
- PMC: articles
- PubMed: articles
- NCBI: proteins

3-deoxy-manno-octulosonate-8-phosphatase (EC 3.1.3.45) catalyzes the reaction

3-deoxy-α-D-manno-2-octulosonic acid 8-phosphate
H_{2}O
P_{i}
3-deoxy-α-D-manno-oct-2-ulopyranosonic acid

The enzyme characterised from Escherichia coli uses water to hydrolyse the phosphate ester, 3-deoxy-α-D-manno-2-octulosonic acid 8-phosphate to the corresponding sugar, with orthophosphate (P_{i}) as byproduct. It is specific for its substrate and is part of the pathway to nucleoside sugars.

The enzyme is an hydrolase, specifically those acting on phosphoric monoester bonds. The systematic name is 3-deoxy-D-manno-octulosonate-8-phosphate 8-phosphohydrolase.
