= CATSPERB =

Protein in homo sapiens

Identifiers
- Aliases: CATSPERB, C14orf161, CatSper(beta), cation channel sperm associated auxiliary subunit beta
- External IDs: OMIM: 611169; MGI: 2443988; GeneCards: CATSPERB

Gene location (Human)
Chr.	Chromosome 14 (human)
Band	14q32.12	Start	91,580,696 bp
Band	14q32.12	End	91,780,707 bp

Gene location (Mouse)
Chr.	Chromosome 12 (mouse)
Band	12|12 E	Start	101,370,912 bp
Band	12|12 E	End	101,592,268 bp
RNA expression pattern
Bgee	Human / Mouse (ortholog); Top expressed in: body of pancreas; testicle; Descending thoracic aorta; ascending aorta; gallbladder; gonad; endometrium; minor salivary glands; islet of Langerhans; tonsil / Top expressed in: spermatocyte; spermatid; testicle; seminiferous tubule; islet of Langerhans; More reference expression data
BioGPS	n/a
Orthologs
Databases	NCBI: entry; OMA: entry
Species	Human	Mouse
Entrez	79820	271036
Ensembl	ENSG00000133962; ENSG00000274338	ENSMUSG00000047014
UniProt	Q9H7T0	A2RTF1
RefSeq (mRNA)	NM_024764	NM_173023
RefSeq (protein)	NP_079040	NP_766611
Location (UCSC)	Chr 14: 91.58 – 91.78 Mb	Chr 12: 101.37 – 101.59 Mb
PubMed search
- Wikidata
View/Edit Human	View/Edit Mouse

Cation channel sperm-associated auxiliary subunit beta is a protein in humans encoded by the CATSPERB gene.
