= Ruptosis =

Ruptosis is a form of cell death observed in Planaria (sp), specifically Schmidtea mediterranea. Specialized cells called ruptoblasts undergo ruptosis, when triggered by the activin hormone. These cells release potent cytotoxic agents that kill nearby cells, bacteria, and even mammalian cells.

== History ==
Scientists observed ruptosis while studying tissue rejection in planarian chimeras. Researchers at Stanford University fused tissue from multiple planarian strains. The chimeras expressed inflammatory responses and tissue rejection. Elevated activin levels accompanied these responses. Live-cell imaging and flow cytometry revealed cells that ruptured within seconds to minutes upon activin exposure. These cells vanished after killing their neighbors. Researchers named the cells ruptoblasts and the process ruptosis. The primary paper appeared in Cell on June 2, 2026.

== Mechanism ==
Ruptoblasts are glandular or secretory cells distributed throughout the planarian body, with fewer in the head region. Single-cell RNA sequencing shows they express markers of parenchymal glandular cells and transcription factor fer3l-1, but not activin itself. Activin also functions as an inflammatory cytokine. Excessive activin arises from protein injection, genetic chimerism, or bacterial infection. Upon detection, endoplasmic reticulum (ER)-derived calcium accumulates rapidly along the cell's cytoskeleton. This creates a calcium gradient between the cell's interior and exterior, leading to a rupture possibly in less than two minutes.

A single ruptoblast was observed to eliminate as many as 70 surrounding cells in vitro, including bacterial, planarian, and mammalian cells. The effect is localized, and does not trigger chain reactions or lingering toxicity. Inhibiting intracellular calcium prevents full membrane rupture. Disrupting myosin II or actin polymerization delays the process. These findings confirm the role of ER calcium and cytoskeletal dynamics.

Ruptoblasts contribute to immune defense and tissue rejection in planarians. In chimeras, they drive inflammation and rejection of foreign tissue. Ablation of ruptoblasts via fer3l-1 knockdown suppresses chronic inflammation, but impairs bacterial clearance. During bacterial infection, such as with E. coli, ruptoblasts activate and clear pathogens through cytotoxic release. Planarians regenerate lost ruptoblasts quickly from neoblasts, their pluripotent stem cells. The localized cytotoxicity suggests potential for targeted applications, such as fighting infections or tumors.

== Evolutionary context ==
Ruptoblasts appear unique to or enriched in basal bilaterians such as planarians. Researchers have reported similar cells in other invertebrates. This points to an ancient evolutionary origin predating vertebrate immune systems. Unlike hematopoietic immune cells (such as T cells or neutrophils) in vertebrates, ruptoblasts derive from glandular lineages. Planarians lack antibodies, yet mount robust responses during regeneration. Ruptosis couples hormonal surveillance (via activin) with immune defense. Vertebrates may have lost this mechanism because they lack the extensive regenerative capacity of planarians, which rely on stem cells to repair ruptosis damage.

== Other cell death pathways ==
Ruptosis differs from known forms of cell death. Apoptosis involves orderly dismantling over hours. Necroptosis and pyroptosis feature membrane pores that gradually leak contents. Ruptosis completes in seconds to minutes with total cell disappearance and rapid, broad-spectrum cytotoxicity. Ruptosis is the most explosive observed cell death. It bears superficial similarities with other lytic deaths, but is unique in its speed, mechanism, and trigger method.

== Research ==
Research explores conservation of ruptoblast-like cells and potential applications.

== See also ==
- Planarian
- Activin
- Cell death
- Regeneration (biology)
