= C3 convertase =

The term C3 convertase may refer to:

- C3-convertase, an enzyme
- Alternative-complement-pathway C3/C5 convertase, an enzyme
