= Apoptosis =

Form of programmed cell death

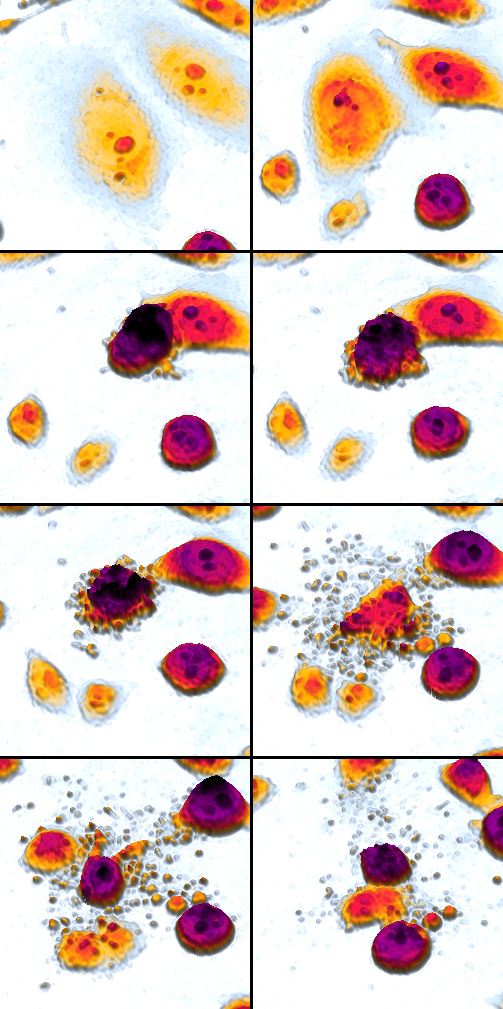
- An etoposide-treated DU145 prostate cancer cell exploding into a cascade of apoptotic bodies. The sub images were extracted from a 61-hour time-lapse microscopy video, created using quantitative phase-contrast microscopy. The optical thickness is color-coded. With increasing thickness, color changes from gray to yellow, red, purple and finally black. See the video at The Cell: An Image Library

Identifiers
- MeSH: D017209

Apoptosis (from Ancient Greek: ἀπόπτωσις, romanized: apóptōsis, lit. 'falling off') is a form of programmed cell death that occurs in multicellular organisms and in some eukaryotic, single-celled microorganisms such as yeast. Biochemical events lead to characteristic cellular changes (morphology) and death. These changes include blebbing, cell shrinkage, nuclear fragmentation, chromatin condensation, DNA fragmentation, and mRNA decay. The average adult human loses 50 to 70 billion cells each day to apoptosis. (Note: Note that the average human adult has more than 13 trillion cells (1.3×10^{13}), of which at most only 70 billion (7.0×10^{10}) die per day. That is, about 5 out of every 1,000 cells (0.5%) die each day due to apoptosis.) For the average human child between 8 and 14 years old, each day the approximate loss is 20 to 30 billion cells.

In contrast to necrosis, which is a form of traumatic cell death that results from acute cellular injury, apoptosis is a highly regulated and controlled process that confers advantages during an organism's life cycle. For example, the separation of fingers and toes in a developing human embryo occurs because cells between the digits undergo a form of apoptosis that is genetically determined. Unlike necrosis, apoptosis produces cell fragments called apoptotic bodies that phagocytes are able to engulf and remove before the contents of the cell can spill out onto surrounding cells and cause damage to them.

Because apoptosis cannot stop once it has begun, it is a highly regulated process. Apoptosis can be initiated through one of two pathways. In the intrinsic pathway the cell kills itself because it senses cell stress, while in the extrinsic pathway the cell kills itself because of signals from other cells. Weak external signals may also activate the intrinsic pathway of apoptosis. Both pathways induce cell death by activating caspases, which are proteases, or enzymes that degrade proteins. The two pathways both activate initiator caspases, which then activate executioner caspases, which then kill the cell by degrading proteins indiscriminately.

In addition to its importance as a biological phenomenon, defective apoptotic processes have been implicated in a wide variety of diseases. Excessive apoptosis causes atrophy, whereas an insufficient amount results in uncontrolled cell proliferation, such as cancer. Some factors, like Fas receptors and caspases, promote apoptosis, while some members of the Bcl-2 family of proteins inhibit apoptosis.

== Discovery and etymology ==
German scientist Carl Vogt was first to describe the principle of apoptosis in 1842. In 1885, anatomist Walther Flemming delivered a more precise description of the process of programmed cell death. However, it was not until 1965 that the topic was resurrected. While studying tissues using electron microscopy, John Kerr at the University of Queensland was able to distinguish apoptosis from traumatic cell death. Following the publication of a paper describing the phenomenon, Kerr was invited to join Alastair Currie, as well as Andrew Wyllie, who was Currie's graduate student, at the University of Aberdeen. In 1972, the trio published a seminal article in the British Journal of Cancer. Kerr had initially used the term programmed cell necrosis, but in the article, the process of natural cell death was called apoptosis. Kerr, Wyllie and Currie credited James Cormack, a professor of Greek language at University of Aberdeen, with suggesting the term apoptosis. Kerr received the Paul Ehrlich and Ludwig Darmstaedter Prize on March 14, 2000, for his description of apoptosis. He shared the prize with Boston biologist H. Robert Horvitz.

For many years, neither "apoptosis" nor "programmed cell death" was a highly cited term. Two discoveries brought cell death from obscurity to a major field of research: identification of the first component of the cell death control and effector mechanisms, and linkage of abnormalities in cell death to human disease, in particular cancer. This occurred in 1988 when it was shown that BCL2, the gene responsible for follicular lymphoma, encoded a protein that inhibited cell death.

The 2002 Nobel Prize in Medicine was awarded to Sydney Brenner, H. Robert Horvitz and John Sulston for their work identifying genes that control apoptosis. The genes were identified by studies in the nematode C. elegans and homologues of these genes function in humans to regulate apoptosis.

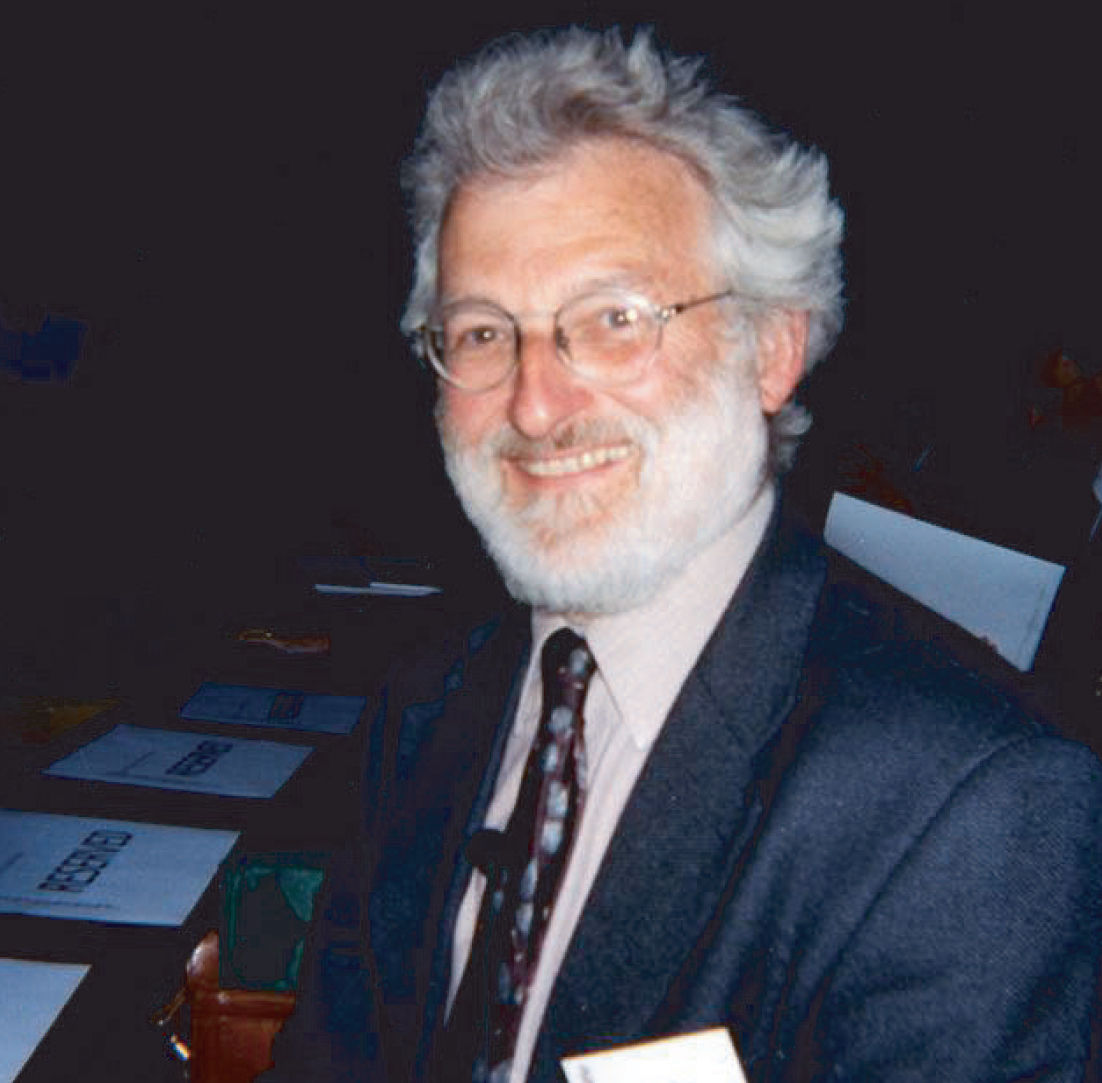
John Sulston won the Nobel Prize in Medicine in 2002, for his pioneering research on apoptosis.

In Greek, apoptosis translates to the "falling off" of leaves from a tree. Cormack, professor of Greek language, reintroduced the term for medical use as it had a medical meaning for the Greeks over two thousand years before. Hippocrates used the term to mean "the falling off of the bones". Galen extended its meaning to "the dropping of the scabs". Cormack was no doubt aware of this usage when he suggested the name. Debate continues over the correct pronunciation, with opinion divided between a pronunciation with the second p silent (/æpəˈtoʊsɪs/ ap-ə-TOH-sis) and the second p pronounced (/eɪpəpˈtoʊsɪs/). In English, the p of the Greek -pt- consonant cluster is typically silent at the beginning of a word (e.g. pterodactyl, Ptolemy), but articulated when used in combining forms preceded by a vowel, as in helicopter or the orders of insects: diptera, lepidoptera, etc.

In the original Kerr, Wyllie & Currie paper, there is a footnote regarding the pronunciation:

We are most grateful to Professor James Cormack of the Department of Greek, University of Aberdeen, for suggesting this term. The word "apoptosis" (ἀπόπτωσις) is used in Greek to describe the "dropping off" or "falling off" of petals from flowers, or leaves from trees. To show the derivation clearly, we propose that the stress should be on the penultimate syllable, the second half of the word being pronounced like "ptosis" (with the "p" silent), which comes from the same root "to fall", and is already used to describe the drooping of the upper eyelid.

== Activation mechanisms ==
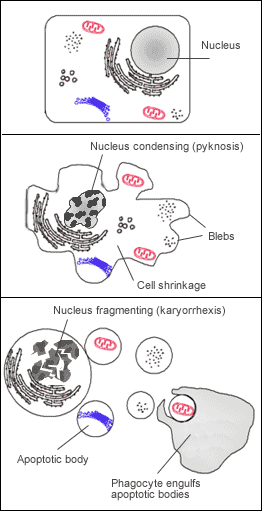

Control of the apoptotic mechanisms

The initiation of apoptosis is tightly regulated by activation mechanisms, because once apoptosis has begun, it inevitably leads to the death of the cell. The two best-understood activation mechanisms are the intrinsic pathway (also called the mitochondrial pathway) and the extrinsic pathway. The intrinsic pathway is activated by intracellular signals generated when cells are stressed and depends on the release of proteins from the intermembrane space of mitochondria. The extrinsic pathway is activated by extracellular ligands binding to cell-surface death receptors, which leads to the formation of the death-inducing signaling complex (DISC).

A cell initiates intracellular apoptotic signaling in response to a stress, which may bring about cell death. The binding of nuclear receptors by glucocorticoids, heat, radiation, nutrient deprivation, viral infection, hypoxia, increased intracellular concentration of free fatty acids and increased intracellular calcium concentration, for example, by damage to the membrane, can all trigger the release of intracellular apoptotic signals by a damaged cell. A number of cellular components, such as poly ADP ribose polymerase, may also help regulate apoptosis. Single cell fluctuations have been observed in experimental studies of stress induced apoptosis.

Before the actual process of cell death is precipitated by enzymes, apoptotic signals must cause regulatory proteins to initiate the apoptosis pathway. This step allows those signals to cause cell death, or the process to be stopped, should the cell no longer need to die. Several proteins are involved, but two main methods of regulation have been identified: the targeting of mitochondria functionality, or directly transducing the signal via adaptor proteins to the apoptotic mechanisms. An extrinsic pathway for initiation identified in several toxin studies is an increase in calcium concentration within a cell caused by drug activity, which also can cause apoptosis via a calcium binding protease calpain.

=== Intrinsic pathway ===
The intrinsic pathway is also known as the mitochondrial pathway. Mitochondria are essential to multicellular life. Without them, a cell ceases to respire aerobically and quickly dies. This fact forms the basis for some apoptotic pathways. Apoptotic proteins that target mitochondria affect them in different ways. They may cause mitochondrial swelling through the formation of membrane pores, or they may increase the permeability of the mitochondrial membrane and cause apoptotic effectors to leak out. There is also a growing body of evidence indicating that nitric oxide is able to induce apoptosis by helping to dissipate the membrane potential of mitochondria and therefore make it more permeable. Nitric oxide has been implicated in initiating and inhibiting apoptosis through its possible action as a signal molecule of subsequent pathways that activate apoptosis.

During apoptosis, cytochrome c is released from mitochondria through the actions of the proteins Bax and Bak. The mechanism of this release is enigmatic, but appears to stem from a multitude of Bax/Bak homo- and hetero-dimers of Bax/Bak inserted into the outer membrane. Once cytochrome c is released it binds with Apoptotic protease activating factor – 1 (Apaf-1) and ATP, which then bind to pro-caspase-9 to create a protein complex known as an apoptosome. The apoptosome cleaves the pro-caspase to its active form of caspase-9, which in turn cleaves and activates pro-caspase into the effector caspase-3.

Mitochondria also release proteins known as SMACs (second mitochondria-derived activator of caspases) into the cell's cytosol following the increase in permeability of the mitochondria membranes. SMAC binds to proteins that inhibit apoptosis (IAPs) thereby deactivating them, and preventing the IAPs from arresting the process and therefore allowing apoptosis to proceed. IAP also normally suppresses the activity of a group of cysteine proteases called caspases, which carry out the degradation of the cell. Therefore, the actual degradation enzymes can be seen to be indirectly regulated by mitochondrial permeability.

=== Extrinsic pathway ===
Overview of signal transduction pathways

Overview of TNF (left) and Fas (right) signalling in apoptosis, an example of direct signal transduction

Two theories of the direct initiation of apoptotic mechanisms in mammals have been suggested: the TNF-induced (tumor necrosis factor) model and the Fas-Fas ligand-mediated model, both involving receptors of the TNF receptor (TNFR) family coupled to extrinsic signals.

==== TNF pathway ====
TNF is a cytokine produced mainly by activated macrophages, and is the major extrinsic mediator of apoptosis. Most cells in the human body have two receptors for TNF: TNFR1 and TNFR2. The binding of TNF to TNFR1 has been shown to initiate the pathway that leads to caspase activation via the intermediate membrane proteins TNF receptor-associated death domain (TRADD) and Fas-associated death domain protein (FADD). cIAP1/2 can inhibit TNF signaling by binding to TRAF2. FLIP inhibits the activation of caspase-8. Binding of this receptor can also indirectly lead to the activation of transcription factors involved in cell survival and inflammatory responses. However, signalling through TNFR1 might also induce apoptosis in a caspase-independent manner. The link between TNF and apoptosis shows why an abnormal production of TNF plays a fundamental role in several human diseases, especially in autoimmune diseases. The TNF receptor superfamily also includes death receptors (DRs), such as DR4 and DR5. These receptors bind to the protein TRAIL and mediate apoptosis. Apoptosis is known to be one of the primary mechanisms of targeted cancer therapy. Luminescent iridium complex-peptide hybrids (IPHs) have recently been designed, which mimic TRAIL and bind to death receptors on cancer cells, thereby inducing their apoptosis.

==== Fas pathway ====
The fas receptor (First apoptosis signal) – (also known as Apo-1 or CD95) is a transmembrane protein of the TNF family which binds the Fas ligand (FasL). The interaction between Fas and FasL results in the formation of the death-inducing signaling complex (DISC), which contains the FADD, caspase-8 and caspase-10. In some types of cells (type I), processed caspase-8 directly activates other members of the caspase family, and triggers the execution of apoptosis of the cell. In other types of cells (type II), the Fas-DISC starts a feedback loop that spirals into increasing release of proapoptotic factors from mitochondria and the amplified activation of caspase-8.

==== Common components ====
Following TNF-R1 and Fas activation in mammalian cells a balance between proapoptotic (BAX, BID, BAK, or BAD) and anti-apoptotic (Bcl-Xl and Bcl-2) members of the Bcl-2 family are established. This balance is the proportion of proapoptotic homodimers that form in the outer-membrane of the mitochondrion. The proapoptotic homodimers are required to make the mitochondrial membrane permeable for the release of caspase activators such as cytochrome c and SMAC. Control of proapoptotic proteins under normal cell conditions of nonapoptotic cells is incompletely understood, but in general, Bax or Bak are activated by the activation of BH3-only proteins, part of the Bcl-2 family.

==== Caspases ====
Caspases play the central role in the transduction of ER apoptotic signals. Caspases are proteins that are highly conserved, cysteine-dependent aspartate-specific proteases. There are two types of caspases: initiator caspases (caspases 2, 8, 9, 10, 11, and 12) and effector caspases (caspases 3, 6, and 7). The activation of initiator caspases requires binding to specific oligomeric activator protein. These active initiator caspases activate the effector caspases through proteolytic cleavage. The active effector caspases then proteolytically degrade a host of intracellular proteins to carry out the cell death program.

==== Caspase-independent apoptotic pathway ====
There also exists a caspase-independent apoptotic pathway that is mediated by AIF (apoptosis-inducing factor).

=== Apoptosis model in amphibians ===
The frog Xenopus laevis serves as an ideal model system for the study of the mechanisms of apoptosis. In fact, iodine and thyroxine also stimulate the spectacular apoptosis of the cells of the larval gills, tail and fins in amphibian's metamorphosis, and stimulate the evolution of their nervous system transforming the aquatic, vegetarian tadpole into the terrestrial, carnivorous frog.

== Negative regulators of apoptosis ==
Negative regulation of apoptosis inhibits cell death signaling pathways, helping tumors to evade cell death and developing drug resistance. The ratio between anti-apoptotic (Bcl-2) and pro-apoptotic (Bax) proteins determines whether a cell lives or dies. Many families of proteins act as negative regulators categorized into either antiapoptotic factors, such as IAPs and Bcl-2 proteins or prosurvival factors like cFLIP, BNIP3, FADD, Akt, and NF-κB.

== Proteolytic caspase cascade: Killing the cell ==
Many pathways and signals lead to apoptosis, but these converge on a single mechanism that actually causes the death of the cell. After a cell receives stimulus, it undergoes organized degradation of cellular organelles by activated proteolytic caspases. In addition to the destruction of cellular organelles, mRNA is rapidly and globally degraded by a mechanism that is not yet fully characterized. mRNA decay is triggered very early in apoptosis.

A cell undergoing apoptosis shows a series of characteristic morphological changes. Early alterations include:

1. Cell shrinkage and rounding occur because of the two parallel processes: (a) retraction of lamellipodia and the breakdown of the proteinaceous cytoskeleton by caspases and (b) water removal decreasing cytoplasmic diffusion.
2. The cytoplasm appears dense, and the organelles appear tightly packed.
3. Chromatin undergoes condensation into compact patches against the nuclear envelope (also known as the perinuclear envelope) in a process known as pyknosis, a hallmark of apoptosis.
4. The nuclear envelope becomes discontinuous and the DNA inside it is fragmented in a process referred to as karyorrhexis. The nucleus breaks into several discrete chromatin bodies or nucleosomal units due to the degradation of DNA.

Apoptosis progresses quickly and its products are quickly removed, making it difficult to detect or visualize on classical histology sections. During karyorrhexis, endonuclease activation leaves short DNA fragments, regularly spaced in size. These give a characteristic "laddered" appearance on agar gel after electrophoresis. Tests for DNA laddering differentiate apoptosis from ischemic or toxic cell death.

=== Apoptotic cell disassembly ===
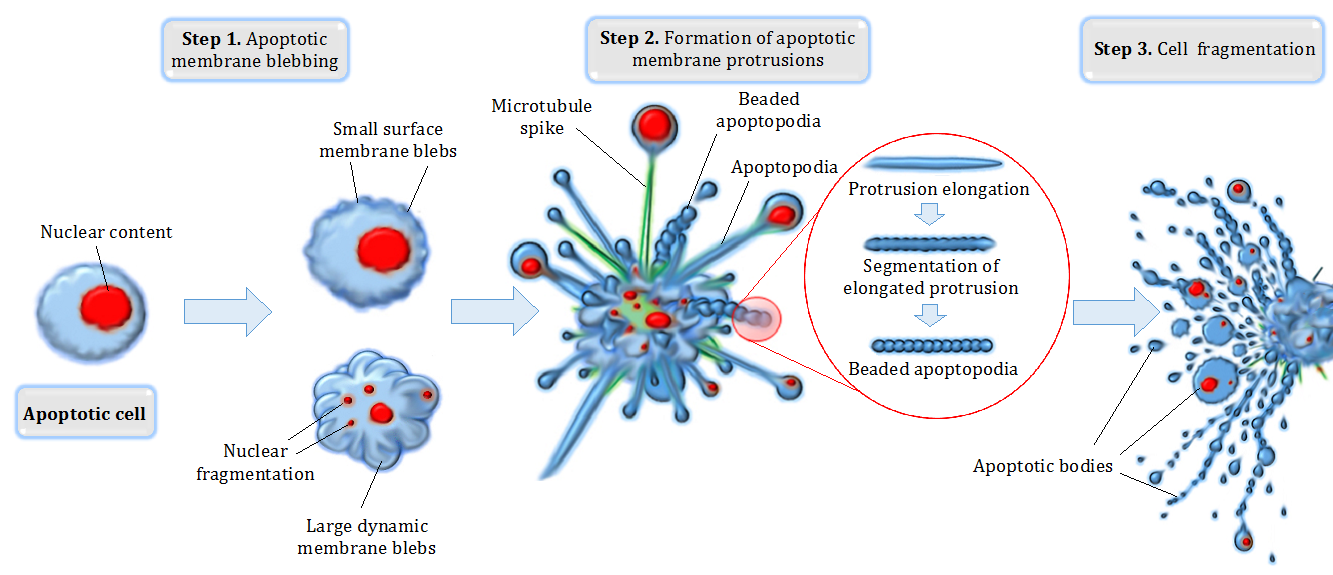
Different steps in apoptotic cell disassembly

Before the apoptotic cell is disposed of, there is a process of disassembly. There are three recognized steps in apoptotic cell disassembly:

1. Membrane blebbing: The cell membrane shows irregular buds known as blebs. Initially these are smaller surface blebs. Later these can grow into larger so-called dynamic membrane blebs. An important regulator of apoptotic cell membrane blebbing is ROCK1 (rho associated coiled-coil-containing protein kinase 1).
2. Formation of membrane protrusions: Some cell types, under specific conditions, may develop different types of long, thin extensions of the cell membrane called membrane protrusions. Three types have been described: microtubule spikes, apoptopodia (feet of death), and beaded apoptopodia (the latter having a beads-on-a-string appearance). Pannexin 1 is an important component of membrane channels involved in the formation of apoptopodia and beaded apoptopodia.
3. Fragmentation: The cell breaks apart into multiple vesicles called apoptotic bodies, which undergo phagocytosis. The plasma membrane protrusions may help bring apoptotic bodies closer to phagocytes.

=== Removal of dead cells ===
The removal of dead cells by neighboring phagocytic cells has been termed efferocytosis. Dying cells that undergo the final stages of apoptosis display apoptotic-cell associated molecular patterns (ACAMPs), such as phosphatidylserine on the outer leaflet of the cell membrane. Phosphatidylserine is normally found on the inner leaflet surface of the plasma membrane, but is redistributed during apoptosis to the extracellular surface by a protein known as scramblase. These molecules mark the cell for phagocytosis by cells possessing the appropriate receptors, such as macrophages. The removal of dying cells by phagocytes occurs in an orderly manner without eliciting an inflammatory response. During apoptosis cellular RNA and DNA are separated from each other and sorted to different apoptotic bodies; separation of RNA is initiated as nucleolar segregation.

== Pathway knock-outs ==
Many knock-outs have been made in the apoptosis pathways to test the function of each of the proteins. Several caspases, in addition to APAF1 and FADD, have been mutated to determine the new phenotype. In order to create a tumor necrosis factor (TNF) knockout, an exon containing the nucleotides 3704–5364 was removed from the gene. This exon encodes a portion of the mature TNF domain, as well as the leader sequence, which is a highly conserved region necessary for proper intracellular processing. TNF-/- mice develop normally and have no gross structural or morphological abnormalities. However, upon immunization with SRBC (sheep red blood cells), these mice demonstrated a deficiency in the maturation of an antibody response; they were able to generate normal levels of IgM, but could not develop specific IgG levels. Apaf-1 is the protein that turns on caspase 9 by cleavage to begin the caspase cascade that leads to apoptosis. Since a -/- mutation in the APAF-1 gene is embryonic lethal, a gene trap strategy was used in order to generate an APAF-1 -/- mouse. This assay is used to disrupt gene function by creating an intragenic gene fusion. When an APAF-1 gene trap is introduced into cells, many morphological changes occur, such as spina bifida, the persistence of interdigital webs, and open brain. In addition, after embryonic day 12.5, the brain of the embryos showed several structural changes. APAF-1 cells are protected from apoptosis stimuli such as irradiation. A BAX-1 knock-out mouse exhibits normal forebrain formation and a decreased programmed cell death in some neuronal populations and in the spinal cord, leading to an increase in motor neurons.

The caspase proteins are integral parts of the apoptosis pathway, so it follows that knock-outs made have varying damaging results. A caspase 9 knock-out leads to a severe brain malformation. A caspase 8 knock-out leads to cardiac failure and thus embryonic lethality. However, with the use of cre-lox technology, a caspase 8 knock-out has been created that exhibits an increase in peripheral T cells, an impaired T cell response, and a defect in neural tube closure. These mice were found to be resistant to apoptosis mediated by CD95, TNFR, etc. but not resistant to apoptosis caused by UV irradiation, chemotherapeutic drugs, and other stimuli. Finally, a caspase 3 knock-out was characterized by ectopic cell masses in the brain and abnormal apoptotic features such as membrane blebbing or nuclear fragmentation. A remarkable feature of these KO mice is that they have a very restricted phenotype: Casp3, 9, APAF-1 KO mice have deformations of neural tissue and FADD and Casp 8 KO showed defective heart development, however, in both types of KO other organs developed normally and some cell types were still sensitive to apoptotic stimuli suggesting that unknown proapoptotic pathways exist.

== Methods for distinguishing apoptotic from necrotic cells ==
Long-term live cell imaging (12h) of multinucleated mouse pre-Adipocyte trying to undergo mitosis. Due to the excess of genetic material the cell fails to replicate and dies by apoptosis.

Label-free live cell imaging, time-lapse microscopy, flow fluorocytometry, and transmission electron microscopy can be used to compare apoptotic and necrotic cells. There are also various biochemical techniques for analysis of cell surface markers (phosphatidylserine exposure versus cell permeability by flow cytometry), cellular markers such as DNA fragmentation (flow cytometry), caspase activation, Bid cleavage, and cytochrome c release (Western blotting). Supernatant screening for caspases, HMGB1, and cytokeratin 18 release can identify primary from secondary necrotic cells. However, no distinct surface or biochemical markers of necrotic cell death have been identified yet, and only negative markers are available. These include absence of apoptotic markers (caspase activation, cytochrome c release, and oligonucleosomal DNA fragmentation) and differential kinetics of cell death markers (phosphatidylserine exposure and cell membrane permeabilization). A selection of techniques that can be used to distinguish apoptosis from necroptotic cells could be found in these references.

== Implication in disease ==
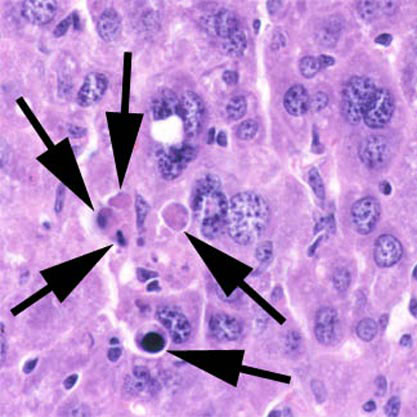
A section of mouse liver showing several apoptotic cells, indicated by arrows

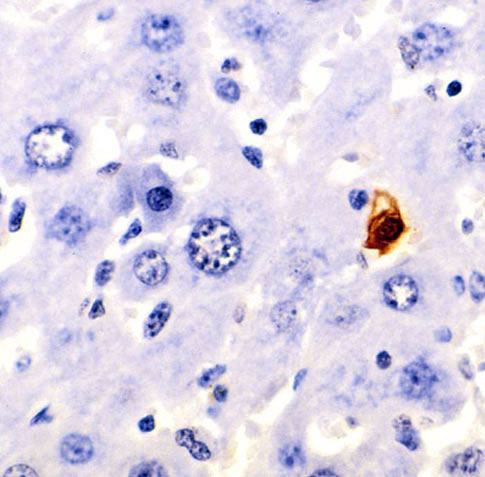
A section of mouse liver stained to show cells undergoing apoptosis (orange)

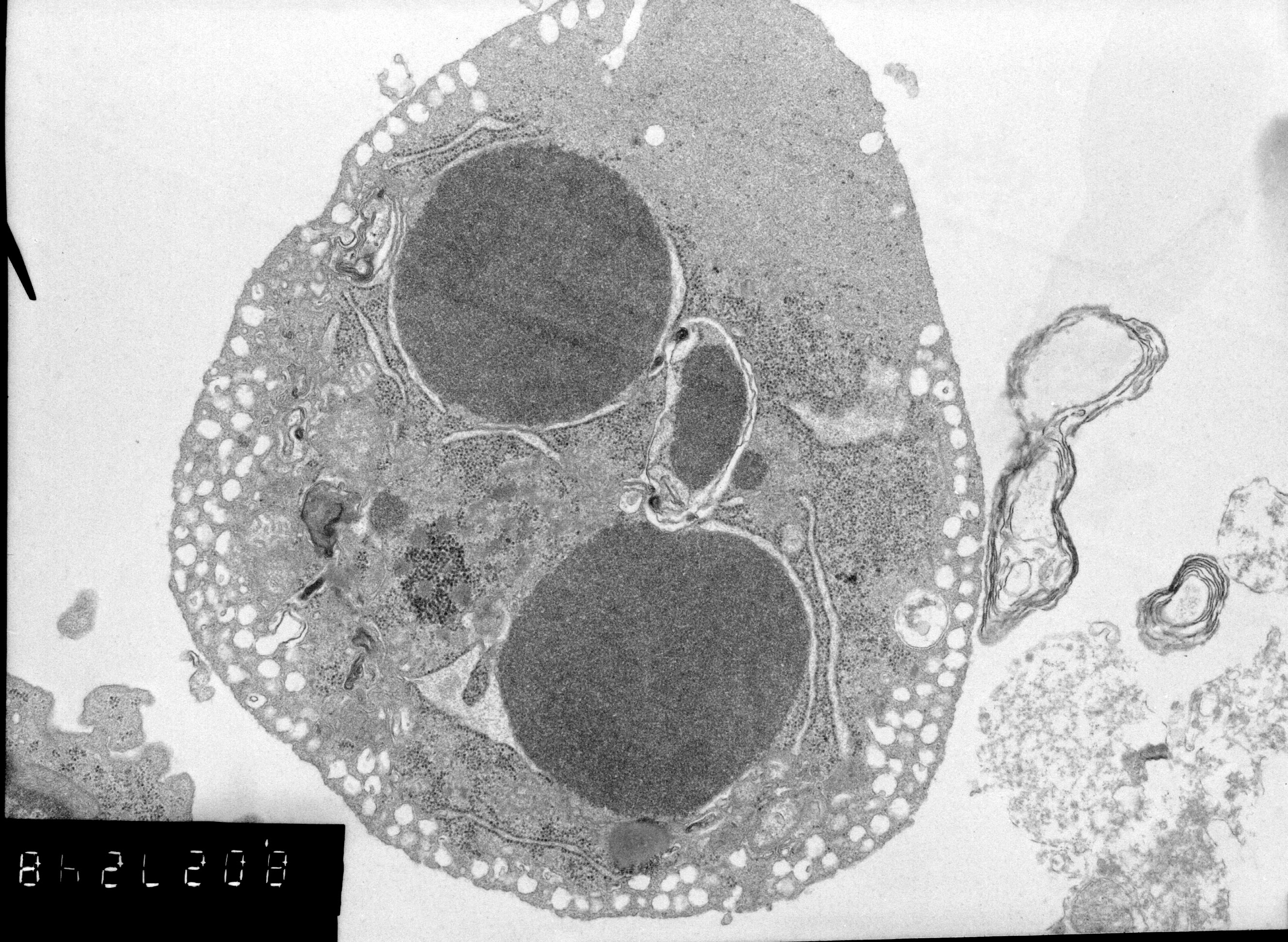
Neonatal cardiomyocytes ultrastructure after anoxia-reoxygenation

=== Defective pathways ===
The various types of apoptotic pathways contain a multitude of different biochemical components, many of them not yet understood. As a pathway is more or less sequential in nature, removing or modifying one component leads to an effect in another. In a living organism, this can have disastrous effects, often in the form of disease or disorder. A discussion of every disease caused by modification of the various apoptotic pathways would be impractical, but the underlying concept is the same: The normal functioning of the pathway has been disrupted in such a way as to impair the ability of the cell to undergo normal apoptosis. This results in a cell that lives past its "use-by date" and can replicate and pass on any faulty machinery to its progeny, increasing the likelihood of the cell's becoming cancerous or diseased.

A recently described example of this concept in action can be seen in the development of a lung cancer called NCI-H460. The X-linked inhibitor of apoptosis protein (XIAP) is overexpressed in cells of the H460 cell line. XIAPs bind to the processed form of caspase-9 and suppress the activity of apoptotic activator cytochrome c; therefore, overexpression leads to a decrease in the number of proapoptotic agonists. As a consequence, the balance of anti-apoptotic and proapoptotic effectors is upset in favour of the former, and the damaged cells continue to replicate despite being directed to die. Defects in regulation of apoptosis in cancer cells occur often at the level of control of transcription factors. As a particular example, defects in molecules that control transcription factor NF-κB in cancer change the mode of transcriptional regulation and the response to apoptotic signals, to curtail dependence on the tissue that the cell belongs. This degree of independence from external survival signals, can enable cancer metastasis.

==== Dysregulation of p53 ====
The tumor-suppressor protein p53 accumulates when DNA is damaged due to a chain of biochemical factors. Part of this pathway includes alpha-interferon and beta-interferon, which induce transcription of the p53 gene, resulting in the increase of p53 protein level and enhancement of cancer cell-apoptosis. p53 prevents the cell from replicating by stopping the cell cycle at G1, or interphase, to give the cell time to repair; however, it will induce apoptosis if damage is extensive and repair efforts fail. Any disruption to the regulation of the p53 or interferon genes will result in impaired apoptosis and the possible formation of tumors.

=== Inhibition ===
Inhibition of apoptosis can result in a number of cancers, inflammatory diseases, and viral infections. It was originally believed that the associated accumulation of cells was due to an increase in cellular proliferation, but it is now known that it is also due to a decrease in cell death. The most common of these diseases is cancer, the disease of excessive cellular proliferation, which is often characterized by an overexpression of IAP family members. As a result, the malignant cells experience an abnormal response to apoptosis induction: Cycle-regulating genes (such as p53, ras or c-myc) are mutated or inactivated in diseased cells, and further genes (such as bcl-2) also modify their expression in tumors. Some apoptotic factors are vital during mitochondrial respiration e.g. cytochrome C. Pathological inactivation of apoptosis in cancer cells is correlated with frequent respiratory metabolic shifts toward glycolysis (an observation known as the "Warburg hypothesis".

==== HeLa cell ====
Apoptosis in HeLa (Note: HeLa cells are an immortalized cancer cell line used frequently in research. The cell line was established by removing cells directly from Henrietta Lacks, a cancer patient.) cells is inhibited by proteins produced by the cell; these inhibitory proteins target retinoblastoma tumor-suppressing proteins. These tumor-suppressing proteins regulate the cell cycle, but are rendered inactive when bound to an inhibitory protein. HPV E6 and E7 are inhibitory proteins expressed by the human papillomavirus, HPV being responsible for the formation of the cervical tumor from which HeLa cells are derived. HPV E6 causes p53, which regulates the cell cycle, to become inactive. HPV E7 binds to retinoblastoma tumor suppressing proteins and limits its ability to control cell division. These two inhibitory proteins are partially responsible for HeLa cells' immortality by inhibiting apoptosis to occur.

==== Treatments ====
The main method of treatment for potential death from signaling-related diseases involves either increasing or decreasing the susceptibility of apoptosis in diseased cells, depending on whether the disease is caused by either the inhibition of or excess apoptosis. For instance, treatments aim to restore apoptosis to treat diseases with deficient cell death and to increase the apoptotic threshold to treat diseases involved with excessive cell death. To stimulate apoptosis, one can increase the number of death receptor ligands (such as TNF or TRAIL), antagonize the anti-apoptotic Bcl-2 pathway, or introduce Smac mimetics to inhibit the inhibitor (IAPs). The addition of agents such as Herceptin, Iressa, or Gleevec works to stop cells from cycling and causes apoptosis activation by blocking growth and survival signaling further upstream. Finally, adding p53-MDM2 complexes displaces p53 and activates the p53 pathway, leading to cell cycle arrest and apoptosis. Many different methods can be used either to stimulate or to inhibit apoptosis in various places along the death signaling pathway.

Apoptosis is a multi-step, multi-pathway cell-death programme that is inherent in every cell of the body. In cancer, the apoptosis cell-division ratio is altered. Cancer treatment by chemotherapy and irradiation kills target cells primarily by inducing apoptosis.

=== Hyperactive apoptosis ===
On the other hand, loss of control of cell death (resulting in excess apoptosis) can lead to neurodegenerative diseases, hematologic diseases, and tissue damage. Neurons that rely on mitochondrial respiration undergo apoptosis in neurodegenerative diseases such as Alzheimer's and Parkinson's. (an observation known as the "Inverse Warburg hypothesis"). Moreover, there is an inverse epidemiological comorbidity between neurodegenerative diseases and cancer. The progression of HIV is directly linked to excess, unregulated apoptosis. In a healthy individual, the number of CD4+ lymphocytes is in balance with the cells generated by the bone marrow; however, in HIV-positive patients, this balance is lost due to an inability of the bone marrow to regenerate CD4+ cells. In the case of HIV, CD4+ lymphocytes die at an accelerated rate through uncontrolled apoptosis, when stimulated.

At the molecular level, hyperactive apoptosis can be caused by defects in signaling pathways that regulate the Bcl-2 family proteins. Increased expression of apoptotic proteins such as BIM, or their decreased proteolysis, leads to cell death and can cause a number of pathologies, depending on the cells where excessive activity of BIM occurs. Cancer cells can escape apoptosis through mechanisms that suppress BIM expression or by increased proteolysis of BIM.

==== Treatments ====
Treatments aiming to inhibit works to block specific caspases. Finally, the Akt protein kinase promotes cell survival through two pathways. Akt phosphorylates and inhibits Bad (a Bcl-2 family member), causing Bad to interact with the 14-3-3 scaffold, resulting in Bcl dissociation and thus cell survival. Akt also activates IKKα, which leads to NF-κB activation and cell survival. Active NF-κB induces the expression of anti-apoptotic genes such as Bcl-2, resulting in inhibition of apoptosis. NF-κB has been found to play both an antiapoptotic role and a proapoptotic role depending on the stimuli utilized and the cell type.

=== HIV progression ===
The progression of the human immunodeficiency virus infection into AIDS is due primarily to the depletion of CD4+ T-helper lymphocytes in a manner that is too rapid for the body's bone marrow to replenish the cells, leading to a compromised immune system. One of the mechanisms by which T-helper cells are depleted is apoptosis, which results from a series of biochemical pathways:

1. HIV enzymes deactivate anti-apoptotic Bcl-2. This does not directly cause cell death but primes the cell for apoptosis should the appropriate signal be received. In parallel, these enzymes activate proapoptotic procaspase-8, which does directly activate the mitochondrial events of apoptosis.
2. HIV may increase the level of cellular proteins that prompt Fas-mediated apoptosis.
3. HIV proteins decrease the amount of CD4 glycoprotein marker present on the cell membrane.
4. Released viral particles and proteins present in extracellular fluid are able to induce apoptosis in nearby "bystander" T helper cells.
5. HIV decreases the production of molecules involved in marking the cell for apoptosis, giving the virus time to replicate and continue releasing apoptotic agents and virions into the surrounding tissue.
6. The infected CD4+ cell may also receive the death signal from a cytotoxic T cell.

Cells may also die as direct consequences of viral infections. HIV-1 expression induces tubular cell G2/M arrest and apoptosis. The progression from HIV to AIDS is not immediate or even necessarily rapid; HIV's cytotoxic activity toward CD4+ lymphocytes is classified as AIDS once a given patient's CD4+ cell count falls below 200.

Researchers from Kumamoto University in Japan have developed a new method to eradicate HIV in viral reservoir cells, named "Lock-in and apoptosis." Using the synthesized compound Heptanoylphosphatidyl L-Inositol Pentakisphophate (or L-Hippo) to bind strongly to the HIV protein PR55Gag, they were able to suppress viral budding. By suppressing viral budding, the researchers were able to trap the HIV virus in the cell and allow for the cell to undergo apoptosis (natural cell death). Associate Professor Mikako Fujita has stated that the approach is not yet available to HIV patients because the research team has to conduct further research on combining the drug therapy that currently exists with this "Lock-in and apoptosis" approach to lead to complete recovery from HIV.

=== Viral infection ===
Viral induction of apoptosis occurs when one or several cells of a living organism are infected with a virus, leading to cell death. Cell death in organisms is necessary for the normal development of cells and the cell cycle maturation. It is also important in maintaining the regular functions and activities of cells.

Viruses can trigger apoptosis of infected cells via a range of mechanisms including:

- Receptor binding
- Activation of protein kinase R (PKR)
- Interaction with p53
- Expression of viral proteins coupled to MHC proteins on the surface of the infected cell, allowing recognition by cells of the immune system (such as natural killer and cytotoxic T cells) that then induce the infected cell to undergo apoptosis.

Canine distemper virus (CDV) is known to cause apoptosis in central nervous system and lymphoid tissue of infected dogs in vivo and in vitro. Apoptosis caused by CDV is typically induced via the extrinsic pathway, which activates caspases that disrupt cellular function and eventually leads to the cells death. In normal cells, CDV activates caspase-8 first, which works as the initiator protein followed by the executioner protein caspase-3. However, apoptosis induced by CDV in HeLa cells does not involve the initiator protein caspase-8. HeLa cell apoptosis caused by CDV follows a different mechanism than that in vero cell lines. This change in the caspase cascade suggests CDV induces apoptosis via the intrinsic pathway, excluding the need for the initiator caspase-8. The executioner protein is instead activated by the internal stimuli caused by viral infection not a caspase cascade.

The Oropouche virus (OROV) is found in the family Bunyaviridae. The study of apoptosis brought on by Bunyaviridae was initiated in 1996, when it was observed that apoptosis was induced by the La Crosse virus into the kidney cells of baby hamsters and into the brains of baby mice.

OROV is a disease that is transmitted between humans by the biting midge (Culicoides paraensis). It is referred to as a zoonotic arbovirus and causes febrile illness, characterized by the onset of a sudden fever known as Oropouche fever.

The Oropouche virus also causes disruption in cultured cells – cells that are cultivated in distinct and specific conditions. An example of this can be seen in HeLa cells, whereby the cells begin to degenerate shortly after they are infected.

With the use of gel electrophoresis, it can be observed that OROV causes DNA fragmentation in HeLa cells. It can be interpreted by counting, measuring, and analyzing the cells of the Sub/G1 cell population. When HeLA cells are infected with OROV, the cytochrome C is released from the membrane of the mitochondria, into the cytosol of the cells. This type of interaction shows that apoptosis is activated via an intrinsic pathway.

In order for apoptosis to occur within OROV, viral uncoating, viral internalization, along with the replication of cells is necessary. Apoptosis in some viruses is activated by extracellular stimuli. However, studies have demonstrated that the OROV infection causes apoptosis to be activated through intracellular stimuli and involves the mitochondria.

Many viruses encode proteins that can inhibit apoptosis. Several viruses encode viral homologs of Bcl-2. These homologs can inhibit proapoptotic proteins such as BAX and BAK, which are essential for the activation of apoptosis. Examples of viral Bcl-2 proteins include the Epstein-Barr virus BHRF1 protein and the adenovirus E1B 19K protein. Some viruses express caspase inhibitors that inhibit caspase activity and an example is the CrmA protein of cowpox viruses. Whilst a number of viruses can block the effects of TNF and Fas. For example, the M-T2 protein of myxoma viruses can bind TNF preventing it from binding the TNF receptor and inducing a response. Furthermore, many viruses express p53 inhibitors that can bind p53 and inhibit its transcriptional transactivation activity. As a consequence, p53 cannot induce apoptosis, since it cannot induce the expression of proapoptotic proteins. The adenovirus E1B-55K protein and the hepatitis B virus HBx protein are examples of viral proteins that can perform such a function.

Viruses can remain intact from apoptosis in particular in the latter stages of infection. They can be exported in the apoptotic bodies that pinch off from the surface of the dying cell, and the fact that they are engulfed by phagocytes prevents the initiation of a host response. This favours the spread of the virus. Prions can cause apoptosis in neurons.

== Plants ==
Programmed cell death in plants has a number of molecular similarities to that of animal apoptosis, but it also has differences, notable ones being the presence of a cell wall and the lack of an immune system that removes the pieces of the dead cell. Instead of an immune response, the dying cell synthesizes substances to break itself down and places them in a vacuole that ruptures as the cell dies. Additionally, plants do not contain phagocytic cells, which are essential in the process of breaking down and removing apoptotic bodies. Whether this whole process resembles animal apoptosis closely enough to warrant using the name apoptosis (as opposed to the more general programmed cell death) is unclear.

== Caspase-independent apoptosis ==
The characterization of the caspases allowed the development of caspase inhibitors, which can be used to determine whether a cellular process involves active caspases. Using these inhibitors, it was discovered that cells can die while displaying a morphology similar to apoptosis without caspase activation. Later studies linked this phenomenon to the release of AIF (apoptosis-inducing factor) from the mitochondria and its translocation into the nucleus mediated by its nuclear localization signal (NLS). Inside the mitochondria, AIF is anchored to the inner membrane. In order to be released, the protein is cleaved by a calcium-dependent calpain protease.

== See also ==
- Anoikis
- Apaf-1
- Apo2.7
- Apoptotic DNA fragmentation
- Atromentin induces apoptosis in human leukemia U937 cells.
- Autolysis
- Autophagy
- Cisplatin
- Cytotoxicity
- Entosis
- Ferroptosis
- Homeostasis
- Immunology
- Necrobiosis
- Necrosis
- Necrotaxis
- Nemosis
- Mitotic catastrophe
- p53
- Paraptosis
- Pseudoapoptosis
- PI3K/AKT/mTOR pathway
- Ruptosis

== General bibliography ==
- Alberts B, Johnson A, Lewis J, Raff M, Roberts K, Walter P (2015). Molecular Biology of the Cell (6th ed.). Garland Science. p. 2. ISBN 978-0-8153-4432-2.
