= Phospholipid-translocating ATPase =

Class of enzymes

phospholipid-translocating ATPase

Identifiers
- EC no.: 3.6.3.1

Databases
- IntEnz: IntEnz view
- BRENDA: BRENDA entry
- ExPASy: NiceZyme view
- KEGG: KEGG entry
- MetaCyc: metabolic pathway
- PRIAM: profile
- PDB structures: RCSB PDB PDBe PDBsum
- Gene Ontology: AmiGO / QuickGO
Search
- PMC: articles
- PubMed: articles
- NCBI: proteins

In enzymology, a phospholipid-translocating ATPase (EC 3.6.3.1) is an enzyme that catalyzes the chemical reaction

ATP + H_{2}O + phospholipid in $\rightleftharpoons$ ADP + phosphate + phospholipid out

The 3 substrates of this enzyme are ATP, H_{2}O, and phospholipid, whereas its 3 products are ADP, phosphate, and phospholipid.

This enzyme belongs to the family of hydrolases, specifically those acting on acid anhydrides to catalyse transmembrane movement of substances. The systematic name of this enzyme class is ATP phosphohydrolase (phospholipid-flipping). Other names in common use include Mg^{2+}-ATPase, flippase, and aminophospholipid-transporting ATPase.
