= Vojo Deretic =

American geneticist

Vojo Deretic, Ph.D.
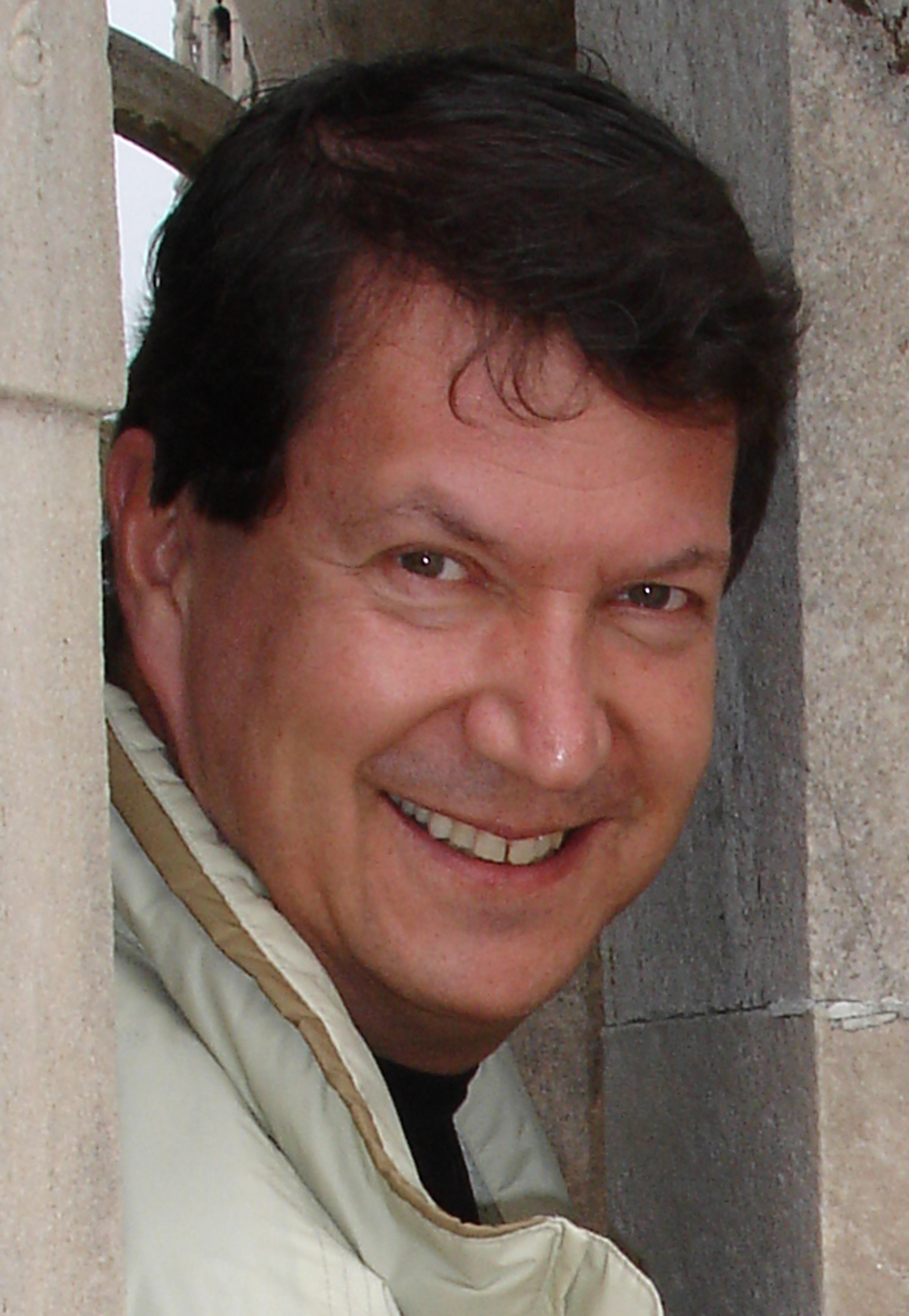
- Known for: Autophagy

Vojo Deretic, is distinguished professor and chair of the Department of Molecular Genetics and Microbiology at the University of New Mexico School of Medicine. Deretic was the founding director of the Autophagy, Inflammation and Metabolism (AIM) Center of Biomedical Research Excellence. The AIM center promotes autophagy research nationally and internationally.

== Education ==
Deretic received his undergraduate, graduate and postdoctoral education in Belgrade, Paris, and Chicago. He was a faculty member at the University of Texas, University of Michigan, and joined University of New Mexico Health Sciences Center in 2001.

== Career and research ==
Deretic's research focuses on autophagy in infection and immunity. Autophagy, a cytoplasmic pathway for quality control and metabolism, removes damaged organelles and has been linked to cancer, neurodegeneration, diabetes, development, and aging. His team helped show that autophagic degradation eliminates intracellular microbes, including Mycobacterium tuberculosis, supporting roles in innate and possibly adaptive immunity.

Studies from his lab defined basic and immune-specialized autophagy mechanisms, including HyPAS prophagophores formed by fusion of ATG16L1^{+} endosomes with cis-Golgi–derived FIP200 membranes, and their conversion to LC3^{+} phagophores via atg8ylation. They further showed that atg8ylation and mATG8s recruit ESCRTs to seal phagophores and maintain nonporous autophagosomal membranes.

The link between autophagy's quality-control and innate immunity functions likely reflects endosymbiotic origins of mitochondria. Autophagy and non-canonical, atg8ylation-linked processes limit microbes but are pathogen targets, as shown by SARS-CoV-2 inhibition of HyPAS formation.

His group connected autophagy to TLRs, TBK1, immunity-related GTPases such as IRGM and TRIMs including TRIM5, TRIM16, PYRIN/TRIM20, and TRIM21, which act as autophagic receptor-regulators. Their studies further showed how IRGM assembles core ATG factors and recruits SNARE Syntaxin 17; TBK1 phosphorylates Syntaxin 17 to control autophagy initiation, and both IRGM and Syntaxin 17 bind ATG8s. They showed that IRGM and mammalian Atg8s regulate lysosomal biogenesis and control mTOR and TFEB.

A recent review proposed membrane "atg8ylation" as a general stress/remodeling response, with mATG8–SNARE interactions expanded to drive lysosome biogenesis via a TGN-lysosome route. These studies suggest mATG8s redirect membrane flow toward the lysosomal–autolysosomal system and help close autophagosomes via ESCRTs. Deretic and Lazarou reviewed the broader atg8ylation model and immune implications, including mTOR inactivation, stress-granule formation, translational control, and the integrated stress response during lysosomal damage.

Work from the AIM Center detailed how cells sense and repair membrane damage: GALTOR (galectin-8–mTOR) links endomembrane damage to autophagy, galectin-3 recruits ESCRTs for lysosome repair, and galectin-9 activates AMPK via K63-ubiquitination of TAK1. They also showed ATG9A with IQGAP1 mobilizes ESCRTs to protect the plasma membrane from pores formed by GSDMD, MLKL, M. tuberculosis, and SARS-CoV-2 ORF3a, and that ATG5 tunes the atg8ylation cascade between autophagy and secretion.

The lab also showed that autophagy mediates unconventional secretion ("secretory autophagy") of cytosolic proteins, including IL-1β, extending autophagy's effects to extracellular signaling and inflammation.

Autophagy and coronavirus biology intersect: SARS-CoV-2 inhibits HyPAS, ATG9A protects from ORF3a-induced plasma-membrane damage, and earlier airway-epithelium work explained chloroquine-like actions on inflammation and fibrosis. Preprints reported chloroquine-like effects of azithromycin/ciprofloxacin and activity of ciprofloxacin (and ambroxol) against SARS-CoV-2 in Vero E6 cells.

A comprehensive review summarized autophagy in immunity and inflammation, and a later review in Immunity surveyed disease links from infection (including COVID-19) to cancer, cardiovascular and liver disease, neurodegeneration, diabetes and metabolic disorders.

Early publications include Cell and Science. Recent primary publications include Cell, Molecular Cell, Developmental Cell, Journal of Cell Biology and Nature Cell Biology.

== See also ==
- Autophagy Inflammation and Metabolism (AIM) Center
