= GBP2 =

Protein-coding gene in humans

Identifiers
- Aliases: GBP2, guanylate binding protein 2
- External IDs: OMIM: 600412; MGI: 102772; GeneCards: GBP2

Gene location (Human)
Chr.	Chromosome 1 (human)
Band	1p22.2	Start	89,106,132 bp
Band	1p22.2	End	89,150,456 bp

Gene location (Mouse)
Chr.	Chromosome 3 (mouse)
Band	3 H1|3 66.69 cM	Start	142,326,363 bp
Band	3 H1|3 66.69 cM	End	142,343,769 bp
RNA expression pattern
Bgee	Human / Mouse (ortholog); Top expressed in: tendon of biceps brachii; Achilles tendon; monocyte; gastric mucosa; granulocyte; pericardium; muscle layer of sigmoid colon; blood; right adrenal gland; urethra / Top expressed in: subcutaneous adipose tissue; mucous cell of stomach; submandibular gland; white adipose tissue; conjunctival fornix; right lung lobe; carotid body; tunica adventitia of aorta; mesenteric lymph nodes; iris; More reference expression data
BioGPS	n/a
Gene ontology
Molecular function	nucleotide binding; GTP binding; protein binding; hydrolase activity; GTPase activity; protein homodimerization activity
Cellular component	Golgi membrane; membrane; nucleoplasm; cytosol; actin cytoskeleton; nucleus; cytoplasm; Golgi apparatus; perinuclear region of cytoplasm; symbiont-containing vacuole membrane; cytoplasmic vesicle
Biological process	type I interferon signaling pathway; immune response; interferon-gamma-mediated signaling pathway; protein localization to nucleus; cellular response to interferon-gamma; cellular response to interleukin-1; cellular response to tumor necrosis factor; defense response to protozoan; defense response to Gram-positive bacterium
Sources:Amigo / QuickGO
Orthologs
Databases	NCBI: entry; OMA: entry
Species	Human	Mouse
Entrez	2634	14469
Ensembl	ENSG00000162645	ENSMUSG00000028270
UniProt	P32456	Q9Z0E6
RefSeq (mRNA)	NM_004120	NM_010260
RefSeq (protein)	NP_004111	NP_034390
Location (UCSC)	Chr 1: 89.11 – 89.15 Mb	Chr 3: 142.33 – 142.34 Mb
PubMed search
- Wikidata
View/Edit Human	View/Edit Mouse

Interferon-induced guanylate-binding protein 2 is a protein that in humans is encoded by the GBP2 gene. GBP2 is a gene related to the superfamily of large GTPases which can be induced mainly by interferon gamma.

== Localization ==
GBP2 gene is located in a various compartment in the cell: nucleus, cytosol and cytoskeleton and also the dimer GBP2-GBP5 localise to the Golgi apparatus.

In addition, the Isoprenylation is required to regulate the intracellular localization and the membrane association of GBP2.

== Activation ==
The murine GBP2 gene is not just highly activated by the interferon-gamma during macrophages activation but also by the stimulation of Toll-like receptors, Tumor necrosis factor (TNF) and Interleukin 1 beta.

== Expression ==
After the stimulation of interferon gamma, GPB2 murine is expressed in the innate and adaptive immune cells.

== Structure ==
Sequence analysis of GBP2 showed the presence of an RNA binding domain which comprises a three RNA recognition motifs (RRM) and SR domain. The amino terminus of GBp2 shares a four Arg-Gly-Gly (RGG) repeat motifs and nine serine residues in the context of arginine/serine motifs.

The SR domain of GBP2 is a phosphorylation site for SR specific protein kinase SRPK (sky1) which lead a nuclear localization of GBP2.

The porcine GBP2 present a high similarity regarding the N-terminal which present a globular domain and contain the GTPase function. However, the C-terminal present a helical domain which is less conserved.

== Interaction ==
GBP2 gene can interact with the RNA via the domain RRM1 and RRM2. The RRM2 domain can recognize the core motif GGUC present in the RNA. Besides, a new type of RRM domain are identified and can interact with THO/TREX complex.

GBp2 gene can cooperate with TREX (transcription- export) complex; a multimeric complex has different transcription factor and exports factors such as Yra1 and Sub2.

== Function ==
Interferons are cytokines that have antiviral effects and inhibit tumor cell proliferation. They induce a large number of genes in their target cells, including those coding for the guanylate-binding proteins (GBPs). GBPs are characterized by their ability to specifically bind guanine nucleotides (GMP, GDP, and GTP). The protein encoded by this gene is a GTPase that converts GTP to GDP and GMP. In addition, GBP2 gene can be a relationship between cell surface receptor and intracellular effectors which can transmit extracellular information into the cells as well as an intracellular signal transduction protein.

A study on the bovine GBP2 gene showed the importance of GBP2 in the regulation of cell proliferation and the resistance to the pathogen infection such as an Exhibition of antiviral activity against influenza virus.

GPB2 Promote an oxidative killing and deliver antimicrobial peptides to autophagolysosomal, providing broad host protection against different pathogen classes. During a viral infection, GBPs Family(GBP1, GBP2 and GBP5) play a vital role to activate canonical and non-canonical inflammasome to response to a pathogen infection via chlamydia muridarum.

== Clinical significance ==
=== Gene Mutation ===
A missense mutation of the GBP2 (A907G) has been identified in patients of a migraine. In the first step can lead to vasomotor dysfunction and then headaches.

=== Breast cancer ===
GBP2 is considered as a control factor for the proliferation and spreading in the tumor cell. The high expression of GBP2 is associated with a better diagnosis of breast cancer. P53 can upregulate GBP2 and play an essential role in the tumor development by inhibition of metalloproteinase MM9 as well as NF-Kappa B and Rac protein.

The transcriptional level of GBP2 is also regulated by two transcription factor STAT1 and IRF1. GBP2 expression have a strong correlation with T cell metagene which seems an association with the infiltration of T cell in the breast cancer.

However, a recent study showed that GBP2 can regulate dynamin-related protein 1 (Drp1) to block the translocation of Drp1 to the mitochondria which lead to an attenuation of the Drp1 dependent mitochondrial fission and also an invasion of breast cancer cells.
