= Interferon-inducible GTPase 5 =

Protein-coding gene in the species Homo sapiens

IRGC

Identifiers
- Aliases: IRGC, CINEMA, IFGGE, IRGC1, Iigp5, R30953_1, immunity related GTPase cinema
- External IDs: MGI: 2685948; GeneCards: IRGC

Gene location (Human)
Chr.	Chromosome 19 (human)
Band	19q13.31	Start	43,716,076 bp
Band	19q13.31	End	43,720,021 bp

Gene location (Mouse)
Chr.	Chromosome 7 (mouse)
Band	7|7 A3	Start	24,131,347 bp
Band	7|7 A3	End	24,151,722 bp
RNA expression pattern
Bgee	Human / Mouse (ortholog); Top expressed in: left testis; right testis; testicle; gonad; rhombencephalon; medulla oblongata; human musculoskeletal system; muscular system; muscle; muscle / Top expressed in: seminiferous tubule; spermatid; spermatocyte; granulocyte; blastocyst; morula; islet of Langerhans; blood; spleen; thymus; More reference expression data
BioGPS	n/a
Orthologs
Databases	NCBI: entry; OMA: entry
Species	Human	Mouse
Entrez	56269	210145
Ensembl	ENSG00000124449	ENSMUSG00000062028
UniProt	Q6NXR0	Q8C262
RefSeq (mRNA)	NM_019612	NM_199013; NM_001358033; NM_001358034
RefSeq (protein)	NP_062558	n/a
Location (UCSC)	Chr 19: 43.72 – 43.72 Mb	Chr 7: 24.13 – 24.15 Mb
PubMed search
- Wikidata
View/Edit Human	View/Edit Mouse

Interferon-inducible GTPase 5 also known as immunity-related GTPase cinema 1 (IRGC1) is an enzyme that in humans is coded by the IRGC gene. It is predicted to behave like other proteins in the p47-GTPase-like and IRG families. It is most expressed in the testis.

== Gene ==
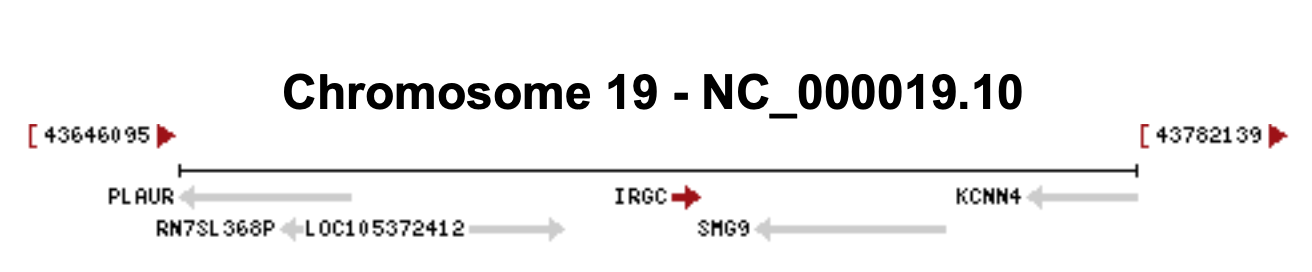
NCBI IRGC gene location on chromosome, includes nearby genes.

IRGC is located on chromosome 19 at position 19q13.31 and contains two exons. It is on the forward strand and is upstream of Phospholipase A2 Inhibitor and Ly6/PLAUR Domain-Containing Protein-Like (LOC105372412) and downstream of Nonsense Mediated mRNA Decay Factor (SMG9).

== Homology and Evolution ==
=== Paralog ===
There is one paralog for IRGC named IRGM. IRGM, or immunity related GTPase M, is associated with intracellular defense. Both are part of the p47-GTPase-like family and the P-loop NTPase domain superfamily. The paralog has 12% identity to IRGC.

=== Orthologs ===
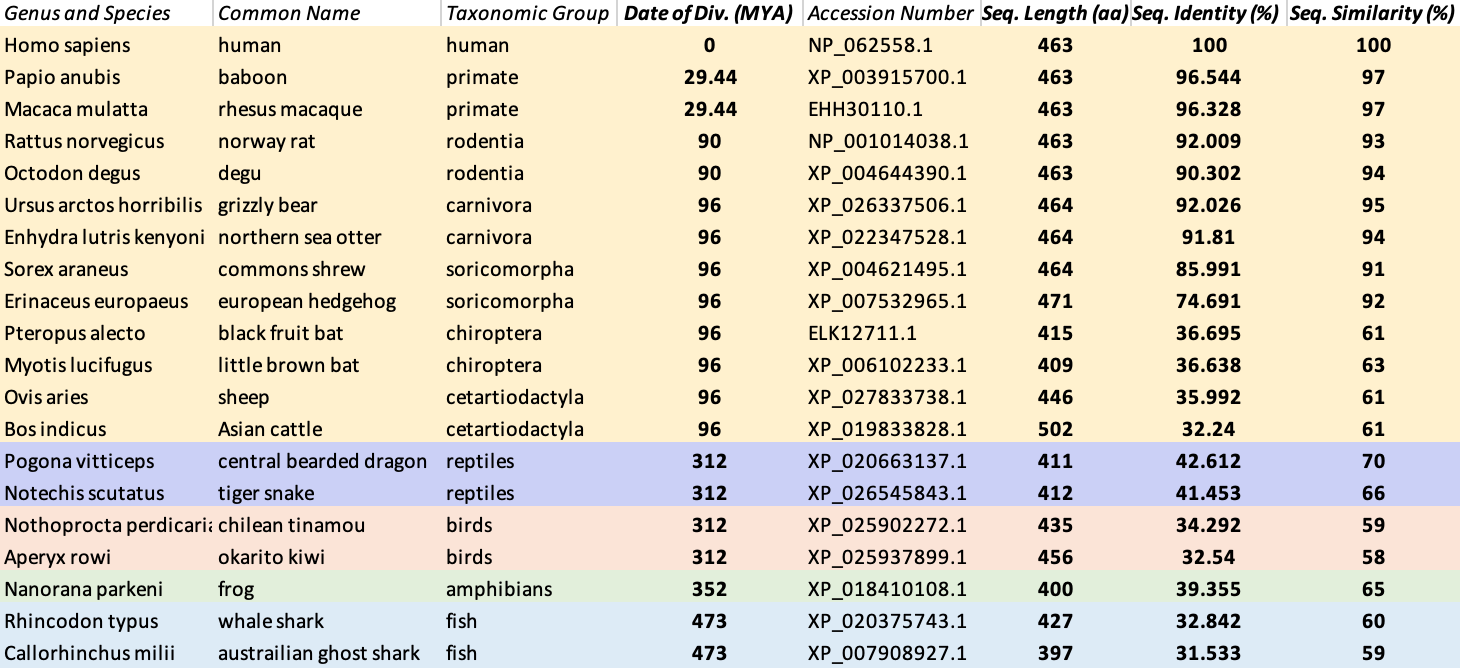
Sample of eukaryotes with orthologous sequences for IRGC, includes sequence identity, estimated date of divergence, and color coded for animal class.

IRGC was observed to be conserved in all vertebrates. The GTP/Magnesium and polypeptide binding regions and a transmembrane region are fairly conserved between species.

=== Evolution ===
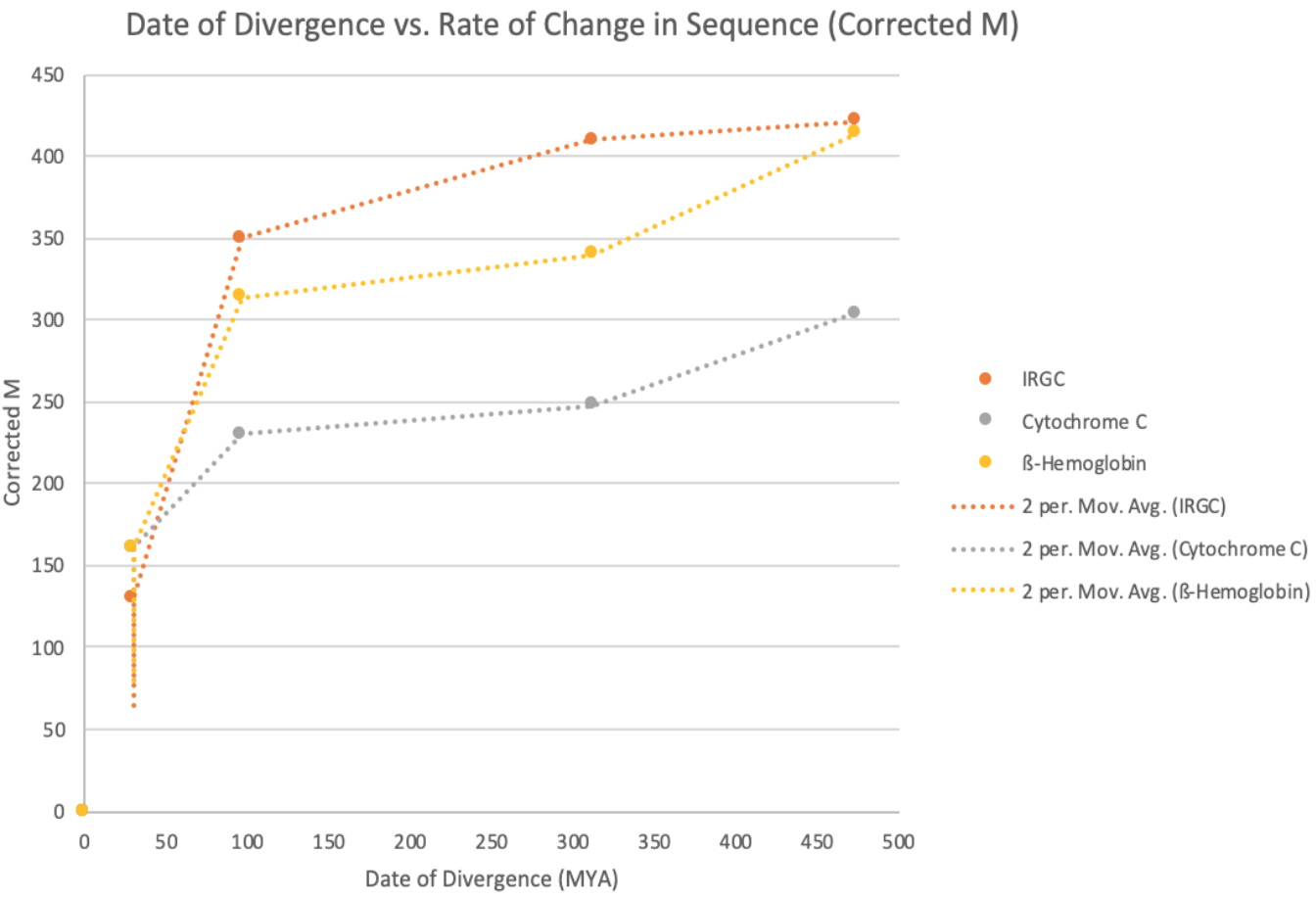
For three genes - IRGC, beta-hemoglobin, and cytochrome c, several distant orthologs of the same type were compared to human sequences for their percent identity. This was plotted and compared to time in millions of years. IRGC is seen to have diverged more rapidly than the other genes.

IRGC is predicted to have evolved more rapidly than cytochrome c and β-hemoglobin when comparing the percent identity of the same species for each gene over 500 million years. It is likely that IRGC and IRGM diverged 350 to 375 million years ago.

== Transcription ==
=== Promoter ===
There was one promoter region, GXP_311825, found for IRGC on chromosome 19. It is 1521 base pairs long and starts at base pair 43714694. It is conserved on all 7 orthologous sequences tested and has the most association with testis, at 8.090 tpm. Of the six potential transcripts, GXT_26231691 had the most CAGE tags. Testis was labeled on 839 of 873 CAGE tags.

=== mRNA ===
The most common transcript for IRGC is 1596 base pairs long and has the accession number NM_019612. Other transcripts include isoform X1, XM_005259058, isoform X2, XM_011527118, and isoform X3, XM_006723283.

== Protein ==
=== Biochemistry ===
Interferon-inducible GTPase 5 is 463 amino acids long, has a molecular weight of 50.3 kDa, and a predicted isoelectric point of 5.22. It is unlikely to have a signal peptide. A transmembrane region is highly predicted between residues 364 and 384, with the first section of the sequence outside of the membrane and the second section within the membrane.

=== Secondary Structure ===
The secondary structure of the protein is expected to have more alpha helices than beta sheets, Close orthologs were observed to have highly similar secondary structures.

=== Tertiary Structure ===
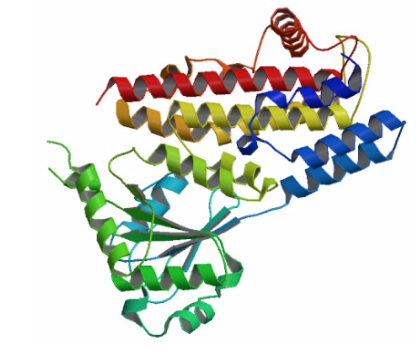
NCBI X-ray crystallography structure for ITQD_A, Chain A for Interferon-inducible GTPase found in mice. It is predicted to be similar in structure to interferon-inducible GTPase 5.

The tertiary structure can be predicted with related X-ray crystallography structures. There was one hit for the protein, ligp1 [Mus musculus], which had an E-value of 2E-76 and an 34% identity over 82% of the protein sequence.

=== Post-Translational Modifications ===
The protein is expected to be GTP and magnesium binding as it contains several related binding sites. It also has predicted homodimer interface regions for polypeptide binding between residues 153 and 163. There are two likely phosphine interaction sites at Ser247 and Ser304. Phosphorylation is expected to be common on serines and a few threonines throughout the sequence, though more are likely after residue 330. A few glyosylation and glycation sites are predicted, though some of the predictions overlap with potential phosphorylation sites.

=== Subcellular Location ===
The protein may be non-cytoplasmic though further localization is unknown at this time.

== Clinical Significance ==
=== Expression ===
Interferon-inducible GTPase 5 is most highly expressed in the testis. The use of two antibodies (HPA046769 and HPA060064) demonstrated higher expression in elongated spermatids than round spermatids. Leydig cells, spermatogonia, and preleptotene spermatocytes were reported to have low expression. There was low to medium expression observed with both antibodies in the duodenum, small intestine, appendix, and kidney. There may be some expression in myocytes and the thyroid, parathyroid, and adrenal glands.

=== Pathology ===
Expression has been observed to decrease under cancer conditions. There is unknown clinical association with transcript variations both in the 3' and 5' UTR and within the coding region.
