= GBP (disambiguation) =

GBP is the ISO 4217 currency code for the British currency, sterling.

GBP may also refer to:

== Science and technology ==
- Gain-bandwidth product, an audio amplification measurement
- Game Boy Player, a Nintendo GameCube to television connector
- Game Boy Pocket, a portable gaming console by Nintendo
- Game Boy Printer
- Gastric bypass procedure, a medical operation for obesity
- Generalized belief propagation, an algorithm in graph theory
- Gigabase pair, a unit for quantifying DNA
- Ginger beer plant, a culture of yeast and bacteria used to produce the drink
- Guanylate-binding protein
- An alias for HADHA, an enzyme

== Organizations ==
- Golden Broadcast Professionals, a Philippines-based broadcasting company
- Green Bay Packers, a football team in the NFL

== Other uses ==
- Nationality code of British Protected Person in the machine-readable passport
- "GBP" (song), a 2025 song by Central Cee and 21 Savage
- BanG Dream! Girls Band Party!, a 2017 mobile rhythm game
- George Brown Polytechnic, in Toronto, Canada
- Google Business Profile, a feature of Google Maps for professionals, formerly Google My Business (GMB)

== See also ==
- .gbp, a common Gerber file extension for bottom solder paste mask files
- Gbps, abbreviation for gigabit per second, a unit for data speeds
