= Dynamin superfamily =

Protein superfamily

Identifiers
- Symbol: DSP
- InterPro: IPR022812

Dynamin Superfamily Protein (DSP) is a protein superfamily includes classical dynamins, GBPs, Mx proteins, OPA1, mitofusins in Eukaryote, and bacterial dynamin-like proteins (BDLPs) in Prokaryote. DSPs mediate eukaryotic membrane fusion and fission necessary for endocytosis, organelle biogenesis and maintenance, Mitochondrial fusion and fission, as well as for prokaryotic cytokinesis.

== Structure ==
All DSPs have two common domains: a GTPase domain and an elongated α-helical bundle domain. Except GBP1, other DSPs have additional domains, like dynamin has a pleckstrin homology domain.
