= GBP5 =

Protein-coding gene in humans

Identifiers
- Aliases: GBP5, GBP-5, guanylate binding protein 5
- External IDs: OMIM: 611467; MGI: 2429943; GeneCards: GBP5

Gene location (Human)
Chr.	Chromosome 1 (human)
Band	1p22.2	Start	89,256,189 bp
Band	1p22.2	End	89,272,860 bp

Gene location (Mouse)
Chr.	Chromosome 3 (mouse)
Band	3|3 H1	Start	142,199,739 bp
Band	3|3 H1	End	142,228,105 bp
RNA expression pattern
Bgee	Human / Mouse (ortholog); Top expressed in: granulocyte; appendix; monocyte; blood; lymph node; spleen; bone marrow cell; gallbladder; right uterine tube; testicle / Top expressed in: spleen; urinary bladder; thymus; white adipose tissue; jejunum; ileum; quadriceps femoris muscle; bone marrow; islet of Langerhans; muscle tissue; More reference expression data
BioGPS	n/a
Gene ontology
Molecular function	nucleotide binding; GTP binding; protein binding; hydrolase activity; GTPase activity; identical protein binding; protein homodimerization activity
Cellular component	cytoplasm; Golgi membrane; Golgi apparatus; membrane; cytoplasmic vesicle; perinuclear region of cytoplasm
Biological process	immune system process; positive regulation of cytokine production involved in inflammatory response; inflammatory response; positive regulation of NLRP3 inflammasome complex assembly; protein homotetramerization; positive regulation of innate immune response; cellular response to interferon-gamma; response to bacterium; protein localization to Golgi apparatus
Sources:Amigo / QuickGO
Orthologs
Databases	NCBI: entry; OMA: entry
Species	Human	Mouse
Entrez	115362	229898
Ensembl	ENSG00000154451	ENSMUSG00000105504
UniProt	Q96PP8	Q8CFB4
RefSeq (mRNA)	NM_052942; NM_001134486; NM_001391920	NM_153564; NM_212440
RefSeq (protein)	NP_001127958; NP_443174	NP_705792
Location (UCSC)	Chr 1: 89.26 – 89.27 Mb	Chr 3: 142.2 – 142.23 Mb
PubMed search
- Wikidata
View/Edit Human	View/Edit Mouse

Guanylate binding protein 5 is a protein in humans that is encoded by the GBP5 gene.

== See also ==
- Guanylate, conjugate base of guanosine monophosphate
- Guanylate-binding protein
