= YWHAZ =

Protein-coding gene in the species Homo sapiens

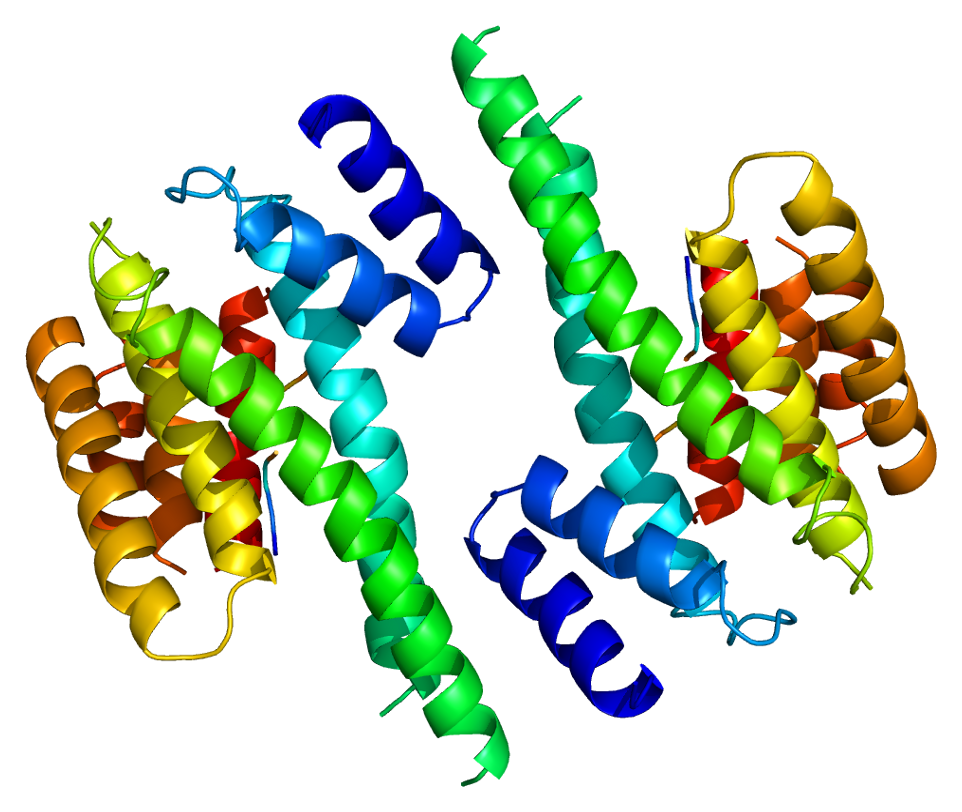

Identifiers
- Aliases: YWHAZ, 14-3-3-zeta, HEL-S-3, HEL4, KCIP-1, YWHAD, HEL-S-93, tyrosine 3-monooxygenase/tryptophan 5-monooxygenase activation protein zeta, POPCHAS
- External IDs: OMIM: 601288; MGI: 109484; GeneCards: YWHAZ
Available structures
PDB	Ortholog search: PDBe RCSB
PDB	List of PDB id codes 1IB1, 1QJA, 1QJB, 2C1J, 2C1N, 2O02, 2WH0, 3CU8, 3NKX, 3RDH, 4BG6, 4FJ3, 4HKC, 4IHL, 4N7G, 4N7Y, 4N84, 4WRQ, 4ZDR, 1A38, 1A4O, 1A37, 5D2D, 5D3F, 5EXA, 5EWZ

Gene location (Human)
Chr.	Chromosome 8 (human)
Band	8q22.3	Start	100,916,523 bp
Band	8q22.3	End	100,953,388 bp

Gene location (Mouse)
Chr.	Chromosome 15 (mouse)
Band	15|15 B3.1	Start	36,771,014 bp
Band	15|15 B3.1	End	36,797,173 bp
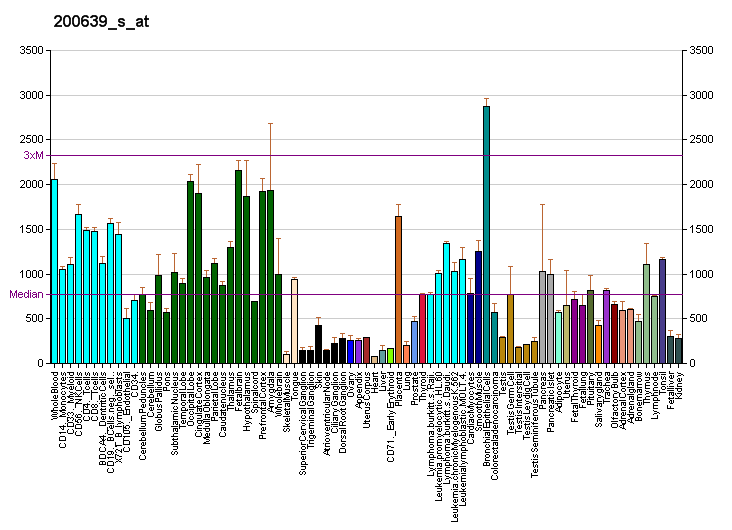

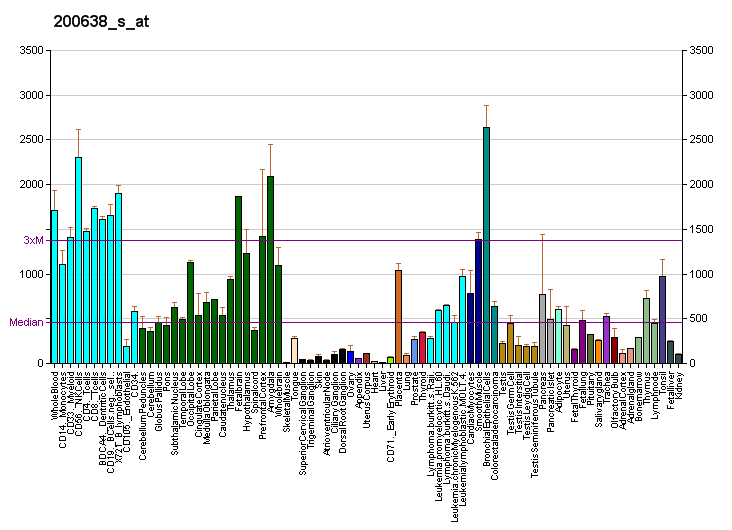

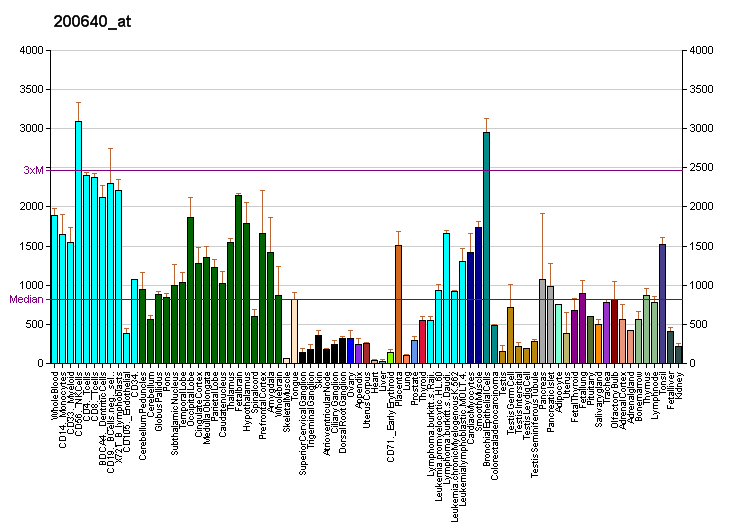
RNA expression pattern
Bgee	Human / Mouse (ortholog); Top expressed in: gingival epithelium; lateral nuclear group of thalamus; ganglionic eminence; amniotic fluid; mucosa of sigmoid colon; human penis; prefrontal cortex; oral cavity; ventricular zone; dorsal motor nucleus of vagus nerve / Top expressed in: olfactory tubercle; anterior amygdaloid area; lateral septal nucleus; subiculum; nucleus accumbens; medial dorsal nucleus; piriform cortex; lateral geniculate nucleus; habenula; Gonadal ridge; More reference expression data
BioGPS	More reference expression data
Gene ontology
Molecular function	protein domain specific binding; transcription factor binding; protein binding; identical protein binding; protein kinase binding; ubiquitin protein ligase binding; RNA binding; cadherin binding; transmembrane transporter binding
Cellular component	cytoplasm; cytosol; blood microparticle; focal adhesion; melanosome; nucleoplasm; mitochondrion; extracellular exosome; cytoplasmic vesicle membrane; extracellular space; nucleus; vesicle; glutamatergic synapse; hippocampal mossy fiber to CA3 synapse
Biological process	regulation of mRNA stability; negative regulation of apoptotic process; establishment of Golgi localization; Golgi reassembly; platelet activation; positive regulation of protein insertion into mitochondrial membrane involved in apoptotic signaling pathway; membrane organization; signal transduction; protein targeting; regulation of cell death; cytokine-mediated signaling pathway; regulation of synapse maturation; synaptic target recognition
Sources:Amigo / QuickGO
Orthologs
Databases	NCBI: entry; OMA: entry
Species	Human	Mouse
Entrez	7534	22631
Ensembl	ENSG00000164924	ENSMUSG00000022285
UniProt	P63104	P63101
RefSeq (mRNA)	NM_001135699; NM_001135700; NM_001135701; NM_001135702; NM_003406 NM_145690	NM_001253805; NM_001253806; NM_001253807; NM_011740; NM_001356569
RefSeq (protein)	NP_001129171; NP_001129172; NP_001129173; NP_001129174; NP_003397 NP_663723	NP_001240734; NP_001240735; NP_001240736; NP_035870; NP_001343498
Location (UCSC)	Chr 8: 100.92 – 100.95 Mb	Chr 15: 36.77 – 36.8 Mb
PubMed search
- Wikidata
View/Edit Human	View/Edit Mouse

14-3-3 protein zeta/delta (14-3-3ζ) is a protein that in humans is encoded by the YWHAZ gene on chromosome 8. The protein encoded by this gene is a member of the 14-3-3 protein family and a central hub protein for many signal transduction pathways. 14-3-3ζ is a major regulator of apoptotic pathways critical to cell survival and plays a key role in a number of cancers and neurodegenerative diseases.

== Structure ==
14-3-3 proteins generally form ~30 kDa-long homo- or heterodimers. Each of the monomers are composed of 9 antiparallel alpha helices. Four alpha-helices (αC, αE, αG, and αI) form an amphipathic groove that serves as the ligand binding site, which can recognize three types of consensus binding motifs: RXX(pS/pT)XP, RXXX(pS/pT)XP, and (pS/pT)X1-2-COOH (where pS/pT represents phosphorylated serine/threonine). In addition to these primary interactions, the target protein can also bind outside the groove via secondary interactions. In particular, the crystallized structure of 14-3-3ζ forms a cup-shaped dimer when complexed with CBY. The YWHAZ gene encodes two transcript variants which differ in the 5' UTR but produce the same protein.

== Function ==
14-3-3ζ is one of 7 members of the 14-3-3 protein family, which is ubiquitously expressed and highly conserved among plants and mammals. This protein family is known for regulating signal transduction pathways primarily through binding phosphoserine proteins, though it can also bind phosphothreonine proteins and unphosphorylated proteins. By extension, 14-3-3 proteins are involved in a wide range of biological processes, including metabolism, transcription, apoptosis, protein transport, and cell cycle regulation. This combination of dependence on phosphorylation and widespread biological impact results in dynamic regulation of multiple signalling pathways and allows for cellular adaptation to environmental changes.

In particular, 14-3-3ζ is a key player in regulating cell survival and interacts with many apoptotic proteins, including Raf kinases, BAX, BAD, NOXA, and caspase-2. For the most part, 14-3-3ζ negatively regulates apoptosis by binding and sequestering BAD and BAX in the cytoplasm, effectively preventing activation of proapoptotic Bcl-2 and Bcl-XL, as well as by preventing NOXA from inhibiting antiapoptotic MCL1. As a result, 14-3-3ζ functions to protect the cell from environmental stresses, such as chemotherapy-induced death, anoikis, growth factor deprivation, and hypoxia. As an example of its dynamic activity, 14-3-3ζ activates autophagy under hypoxic conditions by binding ATG9A, while it prevents autophagy under hyperglycemic conditions by binding Vps34. Furthermore, 14-3-3ζ may regulate glucose receptor trafficking in response to insulin levels through its interaction with IRS1.

In addition to cell survival, 14-3-3ζ regulates cell cycle progression through various ligands and processes. For instance, 14-3-3ζ controls cellular senescence by complexing with BIS to chaperone protein folding of STAT3 and activate the signaling pathway. Also, 14-3-3ζ can negatively regulate the G2-M phase checkpoint by binding and sequestering the cyclin-dependent kinases to the cytoplasm, thus inhibiting their activity. Since 14-3-3ζ is predominantly found in the cytoplasm and binds many nuclear proteins, it likely prevents nuclear import by blocking the nuclear localization signal of target proteins. Its localization to both the cytoplasm and nucleus also suggests a role in gene expression, possibly through regulation of transcription factor activity.

=== Antigenic Function ===
Emerging literature shows the increased presence of the anti-14-3-3ζ antibodies in several immune dysfunctions, including human vasculitis and cancer. The antigenic 14-3-3ζ can directly affect T cell differentiation into Th1 and Th17 cells, and thereby promotes IFN-gamma and IL-17 production. The MHC class II presentation of 14-3-3ζ antigen strongly influence IFN-gamma production. The physiological significance of its antigenic role remains unknown

=== Signaling regulator ===
Intracellular 14-3-3ζ plays a role in interleukin-17 signaling. IL-17A is a proinflammatory cytokine involved in autoimmune diseases and host defense. The presence of 14-3-3ζ creates a bias in IL-17A signaling outcomes, by promoting the production of IL-6 while suppressing CXCL1.

== Clinical Significance ==
The 14-3-3 protein zeta/delta (14-3-3ζ) is a protein (in humans encoded by the YWHAZ gene on chromosome 8) with an important apoptotic constituents. During a normal embryologic processes, or during cell injury (such as ischemia-reperfusion injury during heart attacks and strokes) or during developments and processes in cancer, an apoptotic cell undergoes structural changes including cell shrinkage, plasma membrane blebbing, nuclear condensation, and fragmentation of the DNA and nucleus. This is followed by fragmentation into apoptotic bodies that are quickly removed by phagocytes, thereby preventing an inflammatory response. It is a mode of cell death defined by characteristic morphological, biochemical and molecular changes. It was first described as a "shrinkage necrosis", and then this term was replaced by apoptosis to emphasize its role opposite mitosis in tissue kinetics. In later stages of apoptosis the entire cell becomes fragmented, forming a number of plasma membrane-bounded apoptotic bodies which contain nuclear and or cytoplasmic elements. The ultrastructural appearance of necrosis is quite different, the main features being mitochondrial swelling, plasma membrane breakdown and cellular disintegration. Apoptosis occurs in many physiological and pathological processes. It plays an important role during embryonal development as programmed cell death and accompanies a variety of normal involutional processes in which it serves as a mechanism to remove "unwanted" cells.

As a major hub protein, 14-3-3ζ is involved in various diseases and disorders. For one, 14-3-3ζ plays a central role in cell proliferation and, by extension, tumor progression. The protein has been implicated in many cancers, including lung cancer, breast cancer, lymphoma, and head and neck cancer, through pathways such as mTOR, Akt, and glucose receptor trafficking. Notably, it has been associated with chemoresistance and, thus, is a promising therapeutic target for cancer treatment. So far, it stands to become a prognostic marker for breast cancer, lung cancer, head and neck cancer, and possibly gastric cancer in patients who might require more aggressive treatment. However, no statistically significant relationship was determined in hepatocellular carcinoma.

In addition to cancers, 14-3-3ζ has been implicated in pathogenic infections and neurodegenerative diseases, including Creutzfeldt–Jakob disease, Parkinson's disease, and Alzheimer's disease (AD). 14-3-3ζ has been observed to participate in AD through its interaction with tau protein, and its expression is correlated with disease severity.

The human surfactant protein A, an innate immunity molecule (encoded by two genes SFTPA1 and SFTPA2) appears to be binding with the 14-3-3 protein family. Furthermore, inhibition of 14-3-3 was correlated with lower levels of the surfactant protein indicating a relationship between surface and 14-3-3 proteins. Surfactant is an important element in the maintenance of lung and respiratory functions. A lack of surfactant is closely related to respiratory distress syndrome. Preterm neonates who exhibit neonatal respiratory distress syndrome (NRDS) exhibit a deficiency of surfactant. All together, the 14-3-3 protein may have a significant role in respiratory function and NRDS.

Furthermore, recent studies have shown the 14-3-3ζ plays a significant clinical role in the suppression of the RA symptoms in experimental animals. The 14-3-3ζ KO animals had early onset and severe inflammatory arthritis compared to wild-type. A significantly greater bone loss and immune cell infiltration in the synovial joints was observed in the arthritic 14-3-3ζ KO animals. It plays an active role in promoting collagen synthesis and bone preservation, thereby significantly impacting bone remodeling. Rescue with antibodies failed to suppress the arthritis, however, a 14-3-3ζ immunization in pre-symptomatic rats, both KO and wild type, resulted in significant suppression of the arthritis. Mechanistically, it was observed that 14-3-3ζ downregulates IL-1β and upregulates the IL-1 receptor antagonist, which results in arthritis suppression.

== Interactions ==
YWHAZ has been shown to interact with:

- IRS1,
- Protein phosphatase 1,
- BIS,
- ATG9A,
- NOXA,
- AKT1,
- BCAR1,
- BAX,
- BAD,
- C-Raf,
- CDC25B,
- GP1BA,
- GP1BB,
- HMGN1,
- IL9R,
- LIMK1,
- P53,
- PRKCE
- PRKCZ,
- TNFAIP3,
- TSC2,
- Tau protein, and
- VIM.

== See also ==
- 14-3-3 protein
- PEPITEM
