= Dynamin =

Vesicle formation GTPase family

Dynamin family
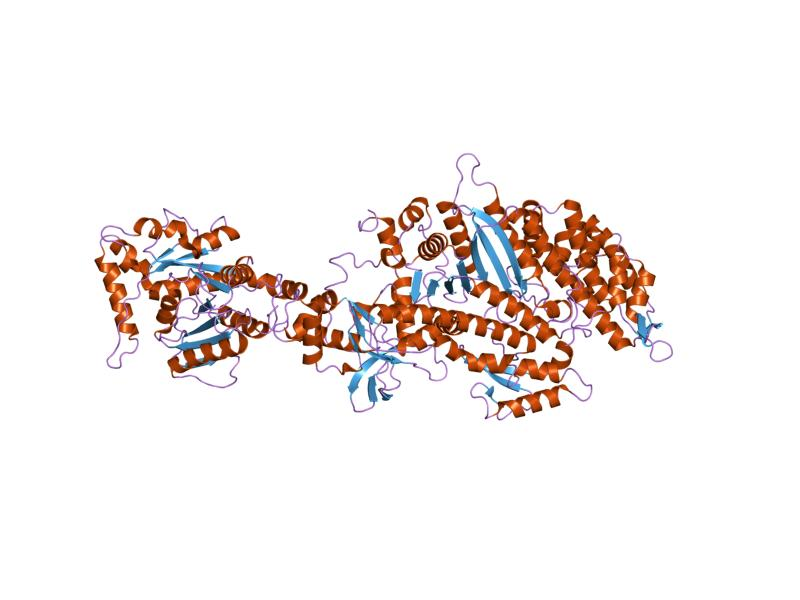
- Structure of the nucleotide-free myosin II motor domain from Dictyostelium discoideum fused to the GTPase domain of dynamin I from Rattus norvegicus

Identifiers
- Symbol: Dynamin_N
- Pfam: PF00350
- Pfam clan: CL0023
- InterPro: IPR001401
- PROSITE: PDOC00362
Available protein structures:
- PDB: IPR001401 PF00350 (ECOD; PDBsum)
- AlphaFold: IPR001401; PF00350

Dynamin central region
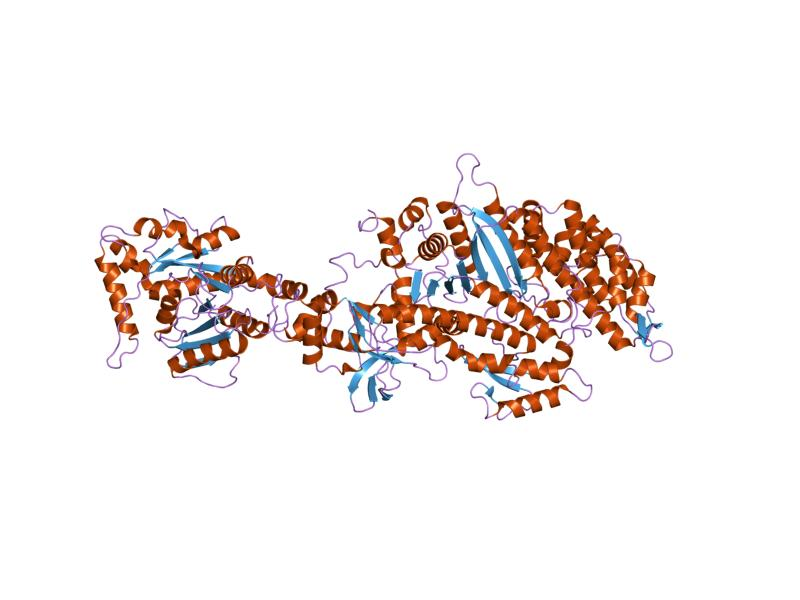
- Structure of the nucleotide-free myosin II motor domain from Dictyostelium discoideum fused to the GTPase domain of dynamin I from Rattus norvegicus

Identifiers
- Symbol: Dynamin_M
- Pfam: PF01031
- InterPro: IPR000375
Available protein structures:
- PDB: IPR000375 PF01031 (ECOD; PDBsum)
- AlphaFold: IPR000375; PF01031

Dynamin is a GTPase protein responsible for endocytosis in the eukaryotic cell. Dynamin is part of the "dynamin superfamily", which includes classical dynamins, dynamin-like proteins, Mx proteins, OPA1, mitofusins, and GBPs. Members of the dynamin family are principally involved in the scission of newly formed vesicles from the membrane of one cellular compartment and their targeting to, and fusion with, another compartment, both at the cell surface (particularly caveolae internalization) as well as at the Golgi apparatus. Dynamin family members also play a role in many processes including division of organelles, cytokinesis and microbial pathogen resistance.

== Structure ==
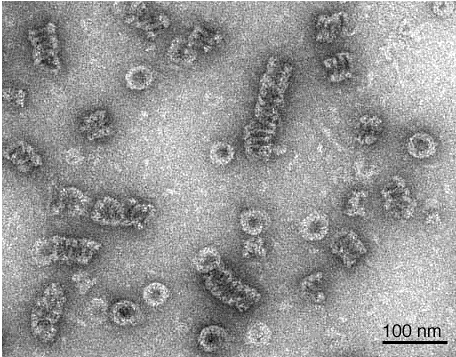
Dynamin assembled into helical polymers as visualized by negative stain electron microscopy.

Dynamin itself is a 96 kDa enzyme, and was first isolated when researchers were attempting to isolate new microtubule-based motors from the bovine brain. Dynamin has been extensively studied in the context of clathrin-coated vesicle budding from the cell membrane. Beginning from the N-terminus, Dynamin consists of a GTPase domain connected to a helical stalk domain via a flexible neck region containing a Bundle Signalling Element and GTPase Effector Domain. At the opposite end of the stalk domain is a loop that links to a membrane-binding Pleckstrin homology domain. The protein strand then loops back towards the GTPase domain and terminates with a Proline Rich Domain that binds to the Src Homology domains of many proteins.

== Function ==
During clathrin-mediated endocytosis, the cell membrane invaginates to form a budding vesicle. Dynamin binds to and assembles around the neck of the endocytic vesicle, forming a helical polymer arranged such that the GTPase domains dimerize in an asymmetric manner across helical rungs. The polymer constricts the underlying membrane upon GTP binding and hydrolysis via conformational changes emanating from the flexible neck region that alters the overall helical symmetry. Constriction around the vesicle neck leads to the formation of a hemi-fission membrane state that ultimately results in membrane scission. Constriction may be in part the result of the twisting activity of dynamin, which makes dynamin the only molecular motor known to have a twisting activity.

== Types ==
In mammals, three different dynamin genes have been identified with key sequence differences in their Pleckstrin homology domains leading to differences in the recognition of lipid membranes:

- Dynamin I is expressed in neurons and neuroendocrine cells
- Dynamin II is expressed in most cell types
- Dynamin III is strongly expressed in the testis, but is also present in heart, brain, and lung tissue.

== Pharmacology ==
Small molecule inhibitors of dynamin activity have been developed, including Dynasore and photoswitchable derivatives (Dynazo) for spatiotemporal control of endocytosis with light (photopharmacology).

== Disease implications ==
Mutations in Dynamin II have been found to cause dominant intermediate Charcot-Marie-Tooth disease. Epileptic encephalopathy–causing de novo mutations in dynamin have been suggested to cause dysfunction of vesicle scission during synaptic vesicle endocytosis.
