= Tooze =

Tooze is a surname. Notable people with the surname include:

== Biologists ==
- John Tooze (1938–2021), British biologist and academic
- Sharon Tooze, American cell biologist
- Zena Tooze (born 1955), Canadian biologist

== Other fields ==
- Adam Tooze (born 1967), British historian
- Walter L. Tooze (1887–1956), American attorney and politician
- Jamie Tooze (born 2007), Welsh musician and producer
