= MX2 =

Protein-coding gene in the species Homo sapiens

Identifiers
- Aliases: MX2, MXB, MX dynamin like GTPase 2
- External IDs: OMIM: 147890; GeneCards: MX2
Available structures
| PDB | Human UniProt search: PDBe RCSB |
| PDB | List of PDB id codes 4WHJ, 4X0R |

Gene location (Human)
| Chr. | Chromosome 21 (human) |
| Band | 21q22.3 | Start | 41,361,999 bp |
| Band | 21q22.3 | End | 41,409,393 bp |
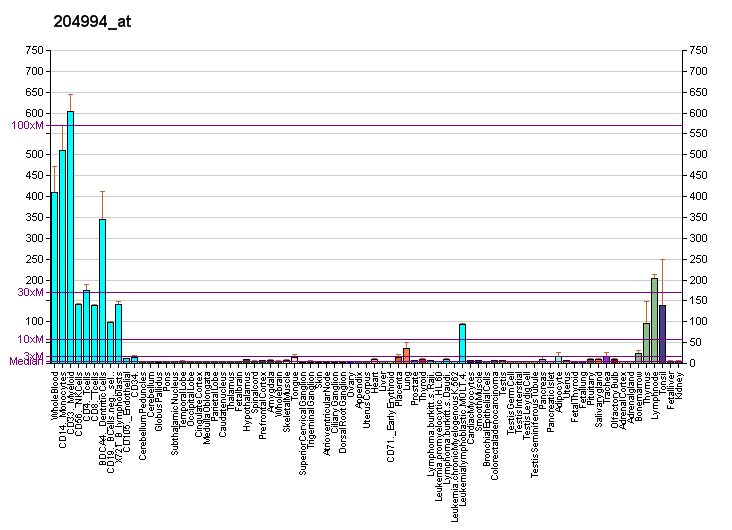
RNA expression pattern
| Bgee | Human / Mouse (ortholog); Top expressed in: blood; monocyte; granulocyte; pancreatic ductal cell; spleen; gallbladder; bone marrow cell; appendix; decidua; periodontal fiber / n/a; More reference expression data |
| BioGPS | More reference expression data |
Gene ontology
| Molecular function | nucleotide binding; GTP binding; protein binding; microtubule binding; GTPase activity |
| Cellular component | cytosol; cytoplasm; nuclear pore; nucleus; mitochondrial membranes; membrane |
| Biological process | defense response; regulation of nucleocytoplasmic transport; mRNA transport; immune system process; response to virus; regulation of cell cycle; defense response to virus; type I interferon signaling pathway; response to interferon-alpha; protein transport; innate immune response; mitochondrial fission; dynamin family protein polymerization involved in mitochondrial fission; membrane fusion |
Sources:Amigo / QuickGO
Orthologs
| Databases | NCBI: entry; OMA: entry |
| Species | Human | Mouse |
| Entrez | 4600 | n/a |
| Ensembl | ENSG00000183486 | n/a |
| UniProt | P20592 | n/a |
| RefSeq (mRNA) | NM_002463 | n/a |
| RefSeq (protein) | NP_002454 | n/a |
| Location (UCSC) | Chr 21: 41.36 – 41.41 Mb | n/a |
| PubMed search | | n/a |
- Wikidata
| View/Edit Human |

Interferon-induced GTP-binding protein Mx2 is a protein that in humans is encoded by the MX2 gene.

The protein encoded by this gene has a nuclear and a cytoplasmic form and is a member of both the dynamin family and the family of large GTPases. The nuclear form is localized in a granular pattern in the heterochromatin region beneath the nuclear envelope. A nuclear localization signal (NLS) is present at the amino terminal end of the nuclear form but is lacking in the cytoplasmic form due to use of an alternate translation start codon.

== Antiviral activity ==
This protein is upregulated by interferon-alpha but does not contain the antiviral activity of a similar myxovirus resistance protein 1.

MX2/MXB has antiviral activity against HIV-1. MXB is also a restriction factor for herpesviruses, which acts at a very early stage of the replication cycle and MX2/MXB restriction of herpesvirus requires GTPase activity.
