= Sharon Tooze =

American cell biologist

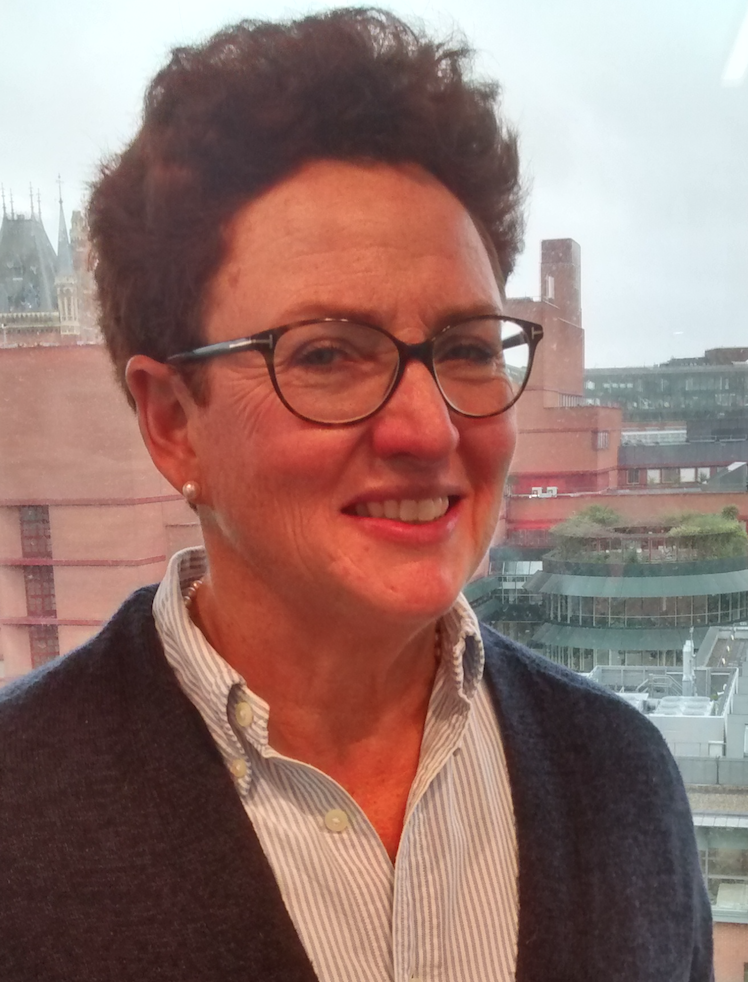
- Tooze in 2019
- Education: College of the Holy Cross (BS); Yale University (MS); European Molecular Biology Laboratory (PhD)
- Known for: Study of Autophagy
- Awards: FMedSci EMBO member
- Scientific career
- Fields: Cell biology

Sharon Tooze FMedSci is an American cell biologist who has made significant contributions to the field of autophagy. She is a senior scientist at the Francis Crick Institute and was awarded European Molecular Biology Organization (EMBO) membership in 2010.

== Education and academic career ==
Tooze graduated from the College of the Holy Cross with a Bachelor of Science in physics in 1979. She then earned a Master of Science (M.S.) in cellular and molecular biology from Yale University in 1982 and her Ph.D. in cell biology from the European Molecular Biology Laboratory (EMBL) in 1986.

After a post doctoral fellowship she was promoted to staff scientist at EMBL in 1990. In 1994, Tooze moved to London to set up a lab studying the biogenesis of secretory granules at the Imperial Cancer Research Fund, later the Cancer Research UK London Research Institute (and now part of the Francis Crick Institute).

== Research interests ==
At EMBL Sharon Tooze studied transport of a viral glycoprotein from a SARS virus and showed that O-linked glycosylation starts in the ER-Golgi intermediate compartment. Later she became interested in organelle biogenesis and in how immature secretory granules form from the trans-Golgi network in neuroendocrine cells.

In 2006, Tooze developed interest in autophagy and the biogenesis of autophagosomes. Since then her lab has identified several mammalian Atg proteins and continues to contribute to understanding of autophagy at the molecular cell biology level.

== Professional associations and awards ==
- British Society for Cell Biology
- In 2010 Tooze was awarded EMBO membership
- In 2017, she was awarded an advanced ERC grant
- Tooze is an affiliate member of the Autophagy Inflammation and Metabolism Centre of Biomedical Research Excellence
- In 2018, she became an elected member of the Academy of Medical Sciences
