= Guanylate-binding protein =

Guanylate-binding protein, N-terminal domain
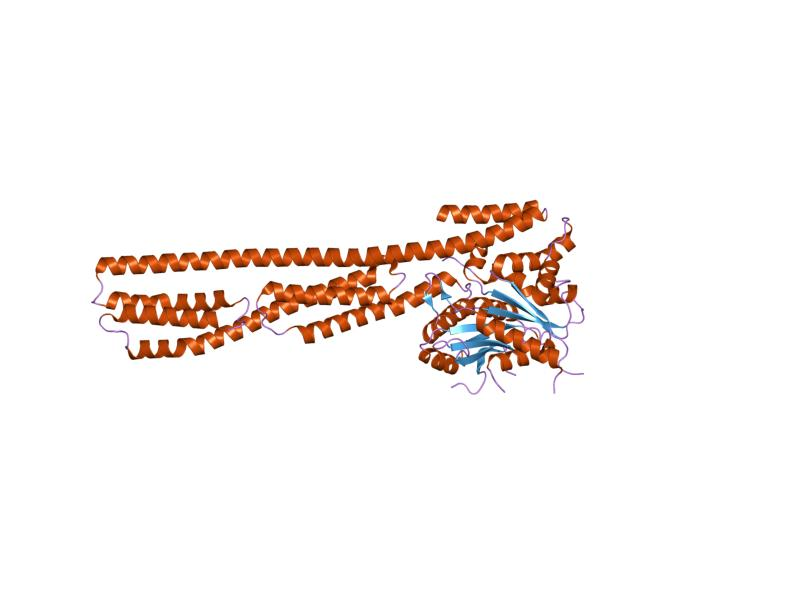
- structure of human guanylate binding protein-1 in nucleotide free form

Identifiers
- Symbol: GBP
- Pfam: PF02263
- Pfam clan: CL0023
- InterPro: IPR015894
- SCOP2: 1dg3 / SCOPe / SUPFAM
Available protein structures:
- PDB: IPR015894 PF02263 (ECOD; PDBsum)
- AlphaFold: IPR015894; PF02263

Guanylate-binding protein, C-terminal domain
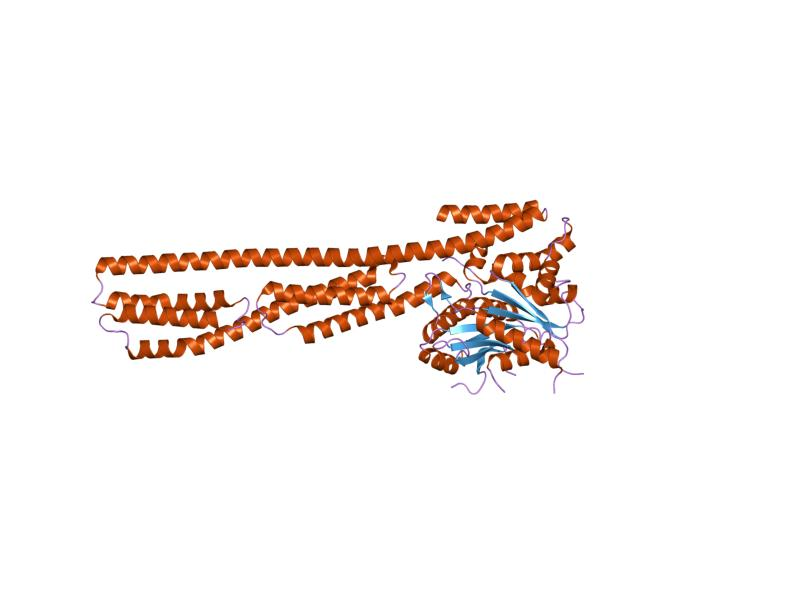
- Structure of human guanylate binding protein-1 in nucleotide free form

Identifiers
- Symbol: GBP_C
- Pfam: PF02841
- InterPro: IPR003191
- SCOP2: 1dg3 / SCOPe / SUPFAM
Available protein structures:
- PDB: IPR003191 PF02841 (ECOD; PDBsum)
- AlphaFold: IPR003191; PF02841

In molecular biology, the guanylate-binding proteins family is a family of GTPases that is induced by interferon (IFN)-gamma. GTPases induced by IFN-gamma (Interferon-inducible GTPase) are key to the protective immunity against microbial and viral pathogens. These GTPases are classified into three groups: the small 47-KD immunity-related GTPases (IRGs), the Mx proteins (MX1, MX2), and the large 65- to 67-kd GTPases. Guanylate-binding proteins (GBP) fall into the last class.

== Genetic Information ==
GBP genes have been universally recognized in mammalian as well as in most other vertebrate genomes. A single cluster of seven human GBP genes (GBP1-GBP7) is found on chromosome 1q22.2. Unlike humans, in genetically controllable disease models such as mice and zebrafish, members of the GBPs gene family are organized in more than one cluster, in this case, 11 (Gbp2b- Gbp110 and 4 genes (Gbp1-Gbp4), respectively. Examinations of GBP-related sequences have shown that zebrafish gbp3 and gbp4 contain an additional function to find (FIIND) and a caspase recruitment (CARD) domains that resemble those found within the inflammasome-related proteins: Apoptosis-associated speck-like protein containing a CARD (PYCARD) and NLR Family Pyrin Domain Containing 1 (NLRP1).

== Structure ==
Structurally, GBPs consist of two domains: a globular N- terminal domain harboring the GTPase function, and an extended C- terminal helical domain. In addition, some members of the GBPs family harbor motifs (e.g., CaaX motifs) or additional domains that are thought to operate in protein-protein or protein-membrane interactions.

== Activity ==
Some GBPs have exhibited the ability to bind not only guanosine triphosphate (GTP) to produce guanosine diphosphate (GDP) but also GDP to produce guanosine monophosphate (GMP) with equimolar affinity and high intrinsic rates of hydrolyzation. The physiological relevance of the GBP's GDPase activity might yield important insights to elucidate GBP-specific defensive profile versus other INF-induced GTPases(e.g.IRGs). Evidence has suggested GBPs as important players in a variety of disease conditions ranging from infectious and metabolic inflammatory diseases to cancer, In the context of cell protection against bacteria, early efforts conducting loss-function assays revealed a reduced host resistance to several pathogens when lacking GBPs. More recent studies have indicated that GBPs appear to be an agent that disturbs the structural integrity of bacteria, stimulates inflammasome signaling, forms complexes on pathogen-containing vesicles in infected cells, and fosters autophagy and oxidative mechanisms helping pathogen clearance.

Human GBP1 is secreted from cells without the need of a leader peptide, and has been shown to exhibit antiviral activity against Vesicular stomatitis virus and Encephalomyocarditis virus, as well as being able to regulate the inhibition of proliferation and invasion of endothelial cells in response to IFN-gamma.

GBP1, the most widely studied GBP, has been studied for its antimicrobial properties. It can effectively polymerize and target the lipopolysaccharide cell wall of gram-negative bacteria. In said bacteria type, the GBP1 polymer coating alters the lipopolysaccharide membrane, allowing access to other parts of the membrane by other innate antimicrobial agents within the cell to cause pathogen cell death. Besides detecting pathogens and causing bacterial cell lysis, GBP1 can also cause host-programmed cell death.

The GBP family of proteins is highly conserved among many different phyla. They are believed to be a shared gene family that is used to fight off mostly viral, parasitic, and bacterial infections. On that note, the expression of GBPs is noted to increase in humans once the body detects many different types of diseases ranging from the infections listed above to cancer. Due to the similarity between murine and human GBPs, mouse knockout studies have been utilized to investigate the different roles GBPs have in fighting off other diseases. These studies have confirmed that knocking out different GBPs has different effects on combating different infections.
