= Interferon-inducible GTPase =

Interferon-inducible GTPase (IIGP)
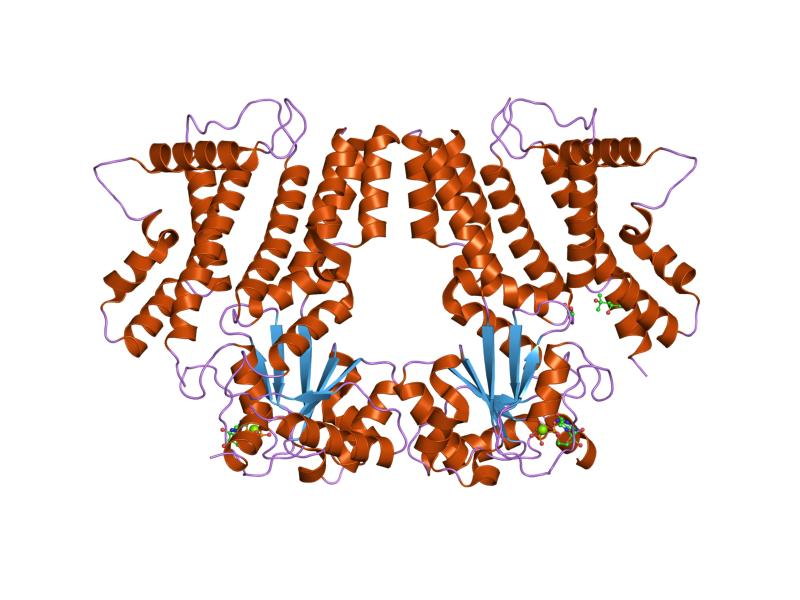
- crystal structure of iigp1: a paradigm for interferon inducible p47 resistance gtpases

Identifiers
- Symbol: IIGP
- Pfam: PF05049
- Pfam clan: CL0023
- InterPro: IPR007743
Available protein structures:
- PDB: IPR007743 PF05049 (ECOD; PDBsum)
- AlphaFold: IPR007743; PF05049

In molecular biology, the interferon-inducible GTPase (IIGP) family of proteins is thought to play a role in intracellular defence. IIGP is predominantly associated with the Golgi apparatus and also localises to the endoplasmic reticulum and exerts a distinct role in IFN-induced intracellular membrane trafficking or processing.

Members of this family include interferon-inducible GTPase 5 and immunity-related GTPase family M protein.
