= Tolerance to infections =

Tolerance to infection, or disease tolerance, is a mechanism that host organisms can use to fight parasites or pathogens that attack the host. Tolerance is not equivalent to resistance. Disease resistance is the host trait that prevents infection or reduces the number of pathogens and parasites within or on a host.

Tolerance to infection can be illustrated via comparing host performance versus increasing load. This is a reaction norm in which host performance is regressed against increasing disease burden. The slope of the reaction norm defines the degree of tolerance. High tolerance is indicated as a flat slope, i.e., host performance is not influenced by increasing burden. Steep downward slope indicates low tolerance in which host performance is strongly reduced with increasing burden. An upward slope indicates overcompensation in which a host increases its performance with increasing burden. Genetic variation in tolerance and its correlation with resistance, can be quantified using random regression model.

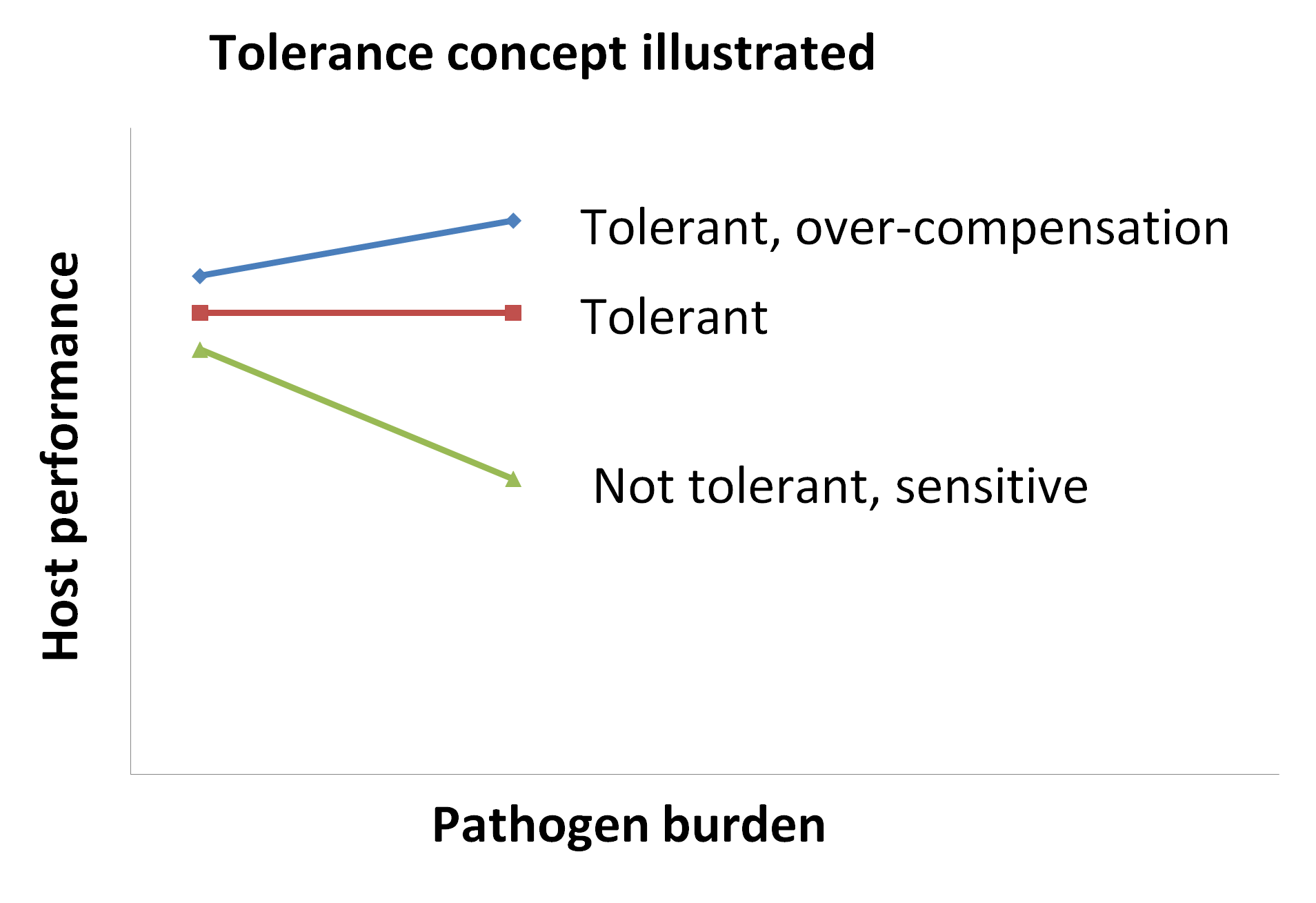
Tolerance to infections concept illustrated as the host performance response to an increasing pathogen load.

In livestock science, tolerance to infections is sometimes termed disease resilience.

A variety of reactions to pathogens are thought to be involved in tolerance, including superior immune system regulation and supplying pathogens with sufficient nutrients to blunt attacks on cells.

== Human tolerance ==
Humans experience tolerance. For example, 90% of people infected with tuberculosis experience no symptoms. Similarly, many humans tolerate helminth infestations.

== Research ==
Much research makes use of the lethal dose 50 protocol. Subjects are given enough pathogen to kill half of them. The remaining half presumably exhibit the desired tolerance. In many cases, the survivors not only survive but are unaffected by the pathogen.

Research is complicated by the fact that animal protocols typically involve expecting some of the subjects to die, which is not ethical in humans.
