= Atg8ylation =

Post-translational modification

Atg8ylation is a process of conjugation of mammalian ATG8 proteins (mATG8s) to proteins or membranes. The process is akin to the ubiquitylation of diverse substrates by ubiquitin. There are six principal mATG8s: LC3A, LC3B, LC3C, GABARAP, GABARAPL1 and GABARAPL2. Together, they comprise a sub-class of ubiquitin-like molecules characterized by two N-terminal α-helices added to the ubiquitin core, which serve a dual role of forming a docking site for interacting proteins containing ATG8-interaction motifs and enhancing mATG8's affinity for membranes.

== Membrane atg8ylation ==
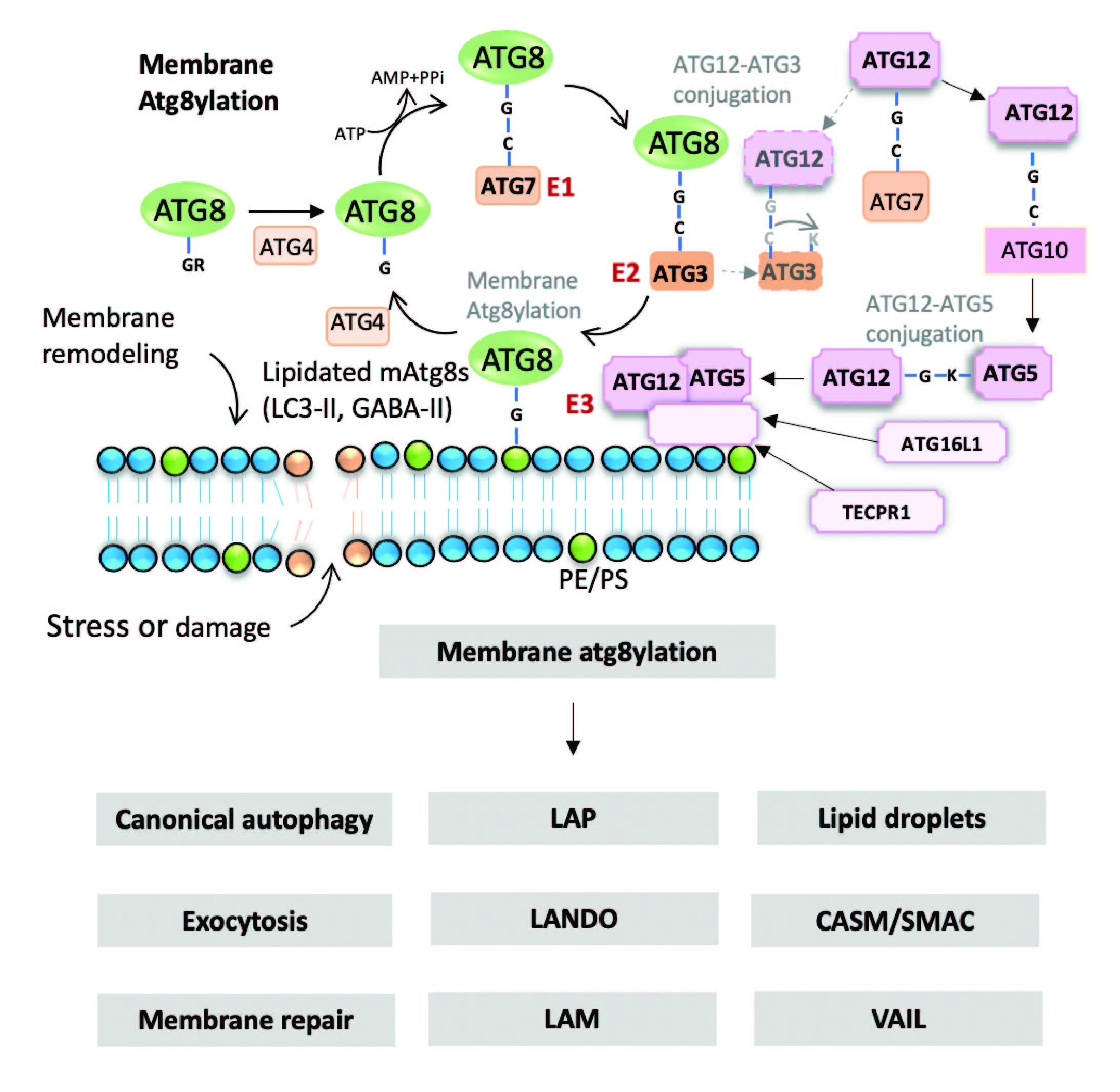
Membrane atg8ylation and its biological outputs in mammalian cells.

Membrane atg8ylation is a response to membrane stress, damage, and remodeling inputs. This process is best appreciated by analogy to ubiquitylation considering that atg8ylation is to membranes what ubiquitylation is to proteins. Membrane atg8ylation occurs via covalent modification by mATG8s of the membrane phospholipids phosphatidylethanolamine and phosphatidylserine. The conjugation cascade that activates mATG8s and results in membrane atg8ylation is biochemically similar to protein ubiquitylation, as both systems require ATP, E1, E2 and E3 ligases. The specific factors leading to atg8ylation include two enzymatic cascades with ATG12-ATG5 and mATG8-phosphatidylethanolamine (PE) conjugates as their end products. The ATG12-ATG5 protein-protein conjugate combines with additional proteins such as ATG16L1 or TECPR1 to form E3 ligases that spatially guide the formation of protein-lipid conjugate resulting in atg8ylation of specific membrane domains

The specialization of atg8ylation for membranes is ensured by the two extra (relative to ubiquitin) α-helices at the N-terminus of mATG8s with concealed affinities for membranes realized during atg8ylation and intrinsic membrane affinities of the atg8ylation cascade E2 component ATG3, as well as E3 components ATG16L1 or TECPR.

== Principles of membrane atg8ylation ==
Mammalian membranes that undergo atg8ylation include: canonical autophagosomes, phagosomes harboring phagocytosed pathogens or microbial products, perturbed or signaling endosomes, damaged lysosomes, exocytic compartments releasing exosomes, endoplasmic reticulum (ER) during its piecemeal ESCRT-dependent lysosomal degradation, and lipid droplets. The delimiting membrane of lipid droplets modified by LC3B is not a full lipid bilayer but a monolayer of phospholipids surrounding neutral lipid core. The lipid droplet atg8ylation illustrates the principle that any cellular membrane may undergo atg8ylation including double membranes of autophagosomes (double lipid bilayer), single membranes (single lipid bilayer) of phagosomes and endosomes, and a phospholipid monolayer (hemilayer) surrounding lipid droplets.

During canonical autophagy, which includes atg8ylation of growing phagophores, WIPI2, an effector of phosphatidylinositol-3-phosphate (a stress-signaling phosphoinositide phospholipid) and a known interactor of ATG16L1, helps dock the E3 ligase ATG12-ATG5/ATG16L1 to the phosphatidylinositol-3-phosphate-marked membranes. This presents activated mATG8s for conjugation to the phospholipid phosphatidylethanolamine embedded within the target membrane.

During noncanonical atg8ylation of stressed, damaged or remodeling membranes other than autophagosomes, the E3 ligases are recruited to target membranes by a variety of mechanisms. This includes docking of the ATG12-ATG5/ATG16L1 E3 ligase on vacuolar compartments including phagosomes, endosomes and lysosomes via binding of ATG16L1 to the vacuolar-type ATPase (v-ATPase). This binding is stimulated when the lumenal pH of the vacuole is perturbed. In other instances, the ATG12-ATG5/TECPR1 E3 ligase docks to stressed membranes via TECPR1, which recognizes the citofacially displayed sphingomyelin misplaced and exposed on perturbed membranes.

== Manifestations of membrane atg8ylation ==
Atg8ylation is an important aspect of canonical autophagy. The initial stages of autophagy morphologically detectable as crescent phagophores do occur independently of all principal mATG8s. Phagophore formation proceeds in cells defective for mATG8 lipidation. However, the size of autophagosomes is smaller without atg8ylation. Further, the quality of autophagosomal membranes, such as membrane permeability, are adversely affected. The known effects of atg8ylation on autophagosomal membranes include membrane remodeling, kinetic effects, selective cargo sequestration into autophagosomes, and effects on autophagosome-lysosome fusion. Atg8ylation is important for ESCRT-dependent sealing of nascent autophagosomes and for their maintenance in an impervious state.

The non-autophagic processes dependent on atg8ylation include: LAP (LC3-associated phagocytosis), LANDO (LC3-associated endocytosis), LC3-associated micropinocytosis (LAM), CASM (conjugation of ATG8 to single membranes) alternatively referred to as SMAC (single membrane ATG8 conjugation), and 'vATPase-ATG16L1 axis xenophagy' known under an acronym VAIL (V-ATPase-ATG16L1-induced LC3 lipidation). Many of the physiological and disease-associated effects of atg8ylation are manifested via these noncanonical processes or through canonical autophagy.
