= GBP1 =

Protein-coding gene in humans

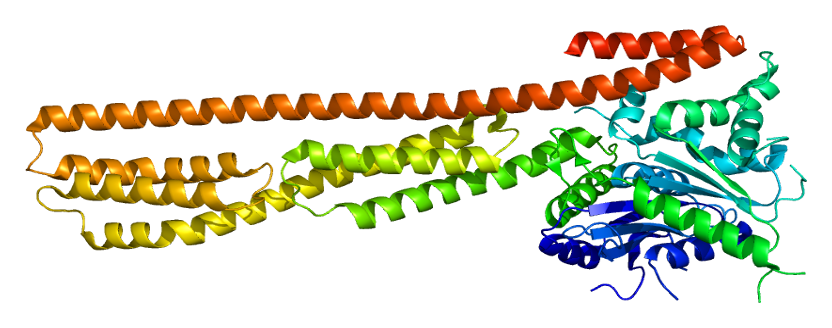

Identifiers
- Aliases: GBP1, guanylate binding protein 1
- External IDs: OMIM: 600411; GeneCards: GBP1
Available structures
PDB	Human UniProt search: PDBe RCSB
PDB	List of PDB id codes 1DG3, 1F5N, 2B8W, 2B92, 2BC9, 2D4H

Gene location (Human)
Chr.	Chromosome 1 (human)
Band	1p22.2	Start	89,051,882 bp
Band	1p22.2	End	89,065,360 bp
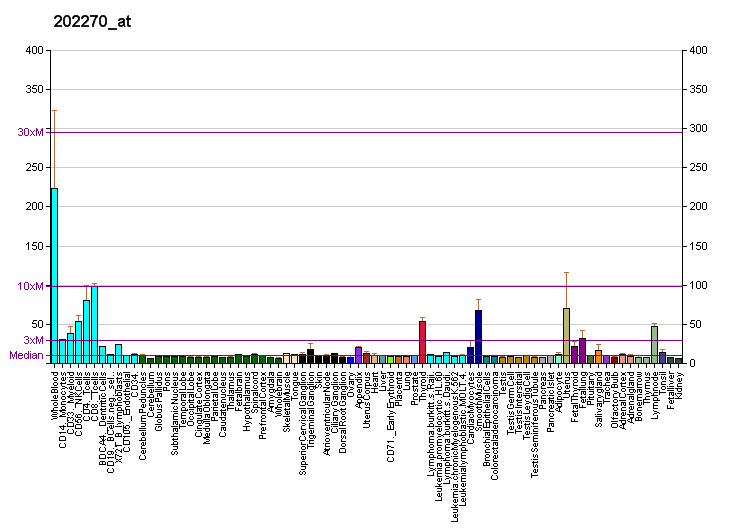

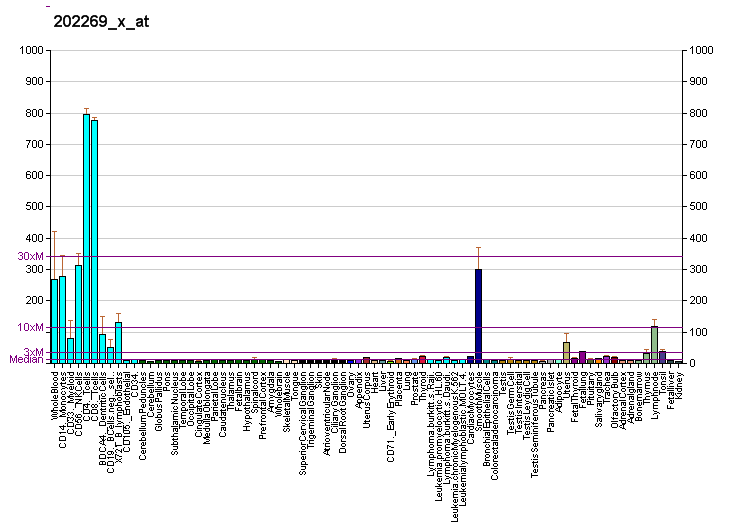
RNA expression pattern
Bgee	Human / Mouse (ortholog); Top expressed in: pericardium; trigeminal ganglion; mucosa of paranasal sinus; lower lobe of lung; superficial temporal artery; appendix; gallbladder; monocyte; tail of epididymis; epithelium of nasopharynx / n/a; More reference expression data
BioGPS	More reference expression data
Gene ontology
Molecular function	nucleotide binding; Hsp90 protein binding; spectrin binding; protein binding; identical protein binding; enzyme binding; actin binding; hydrolase activity; cytokine binding; GTPase activity; GTP binding; GDP binding; protein homodimerization activity
Cellular component	cytosol; membrane; Golgi membrane; plasma membrane; extracellular region; cytoplasm; Golgi apparatus; vesicle membrane; actin cytoskeleton; cytoplasmic vesicle
Biological process	immune system process; interferon-gamma-mediated signaling pathway; negative regulation of T cell receptor signaling pathway; negative regulation of protein localization to plasma membrane; defense response to virus; regulation of calcium-mediated signaling; negative regulation of ERK1 and ERK2 cascade; negative regulation of substrate adhesion-dependent cell spreading; regulation of protein localization to plasma membrane; protein homooligomerization; cellular response to interferon-gamma; cellular response to interleukin-1; cellular response to tumor necrosis factor; protein localization to vacuole
Sources:Amigo / QuickGO
Orthologs
Databases	NCBI: entry; OMA: entry
Species	Human	Mouse
Entrez	2633	n/a
Ensembl	ENSG00000117228	n/a
UniProt	P32455	n/a
RefSeq (mRNA)	NM_002053	n/a
RefSeq (protein)	NP_002044	n/a
Location (UCSC)	Chr 1: 89.05 – 89.07 Mb	n/a
PubMed search		n/a
- Wikidata
View/Edit Human

Interferon-induced guanylate-binding protein 1 is a protein that in humans is encoded by the GBP1 gene. It belongs to the dynamin superfamily of large GTPases.

== Function ==
Guanylate binding protein expression is induced by interferon. Guanylate binding proteins are characterized by their ability to specifically bind guanine nucleotides (GMP, GDP, and GTP) and are distinguished from the GTP-binding proteins by the presence of 2 binding motifs rather than 3.
