= Src homology domain =

In biology, a Src homology domain is one of the two small protein binding domains found in the Src oncoprotein. Homologs of both the Src homology 2 and Src homology 3 domains are found in numerous other proteins. The Src homology 1 domain was an early name of the protein kinase domain.

In terms of initiating the cell cycle when growth factor signals are present, "Src homology domains" are found on Grb2 proteins, allowing them to bind Receptor Tyrosine Kinases (RTKs), and also on SOS proteins allowing them to interact with Grb2. This brings SOS proteins close to the membrane, where Ras-GDP is bound via a lipid "tail". SOS acts as a Guanosine exchange factor (GEF) for Ras, activating Ras to cleave a phosphate group from Raf, causing it to release the 14-3-3 proteins that are keeping it inactive, which through a downstream signalling cascade allows the release of E2F and thus, progression through the Restriction point (R point) in G1 phase of the cell cycle.
