= AIM center =

American medical research institute

Coordinates: 35.0843°N 106.6194°W

The Autophagy, Inflammation and Metabolism Center or AIM Center is an NIH-funded Center of Biomedical Research Excellence focused on the study of autophagy as a fundamental biological process and how it intersects with metabolism and quality control processes in eukaryotic cells. A special emphasis is on the role or autophagy in a wide spectrum of diseases with metabolic, inflammatory and immunological aspects. At the fundamental level, autophagy is a cytoplasmic pathway for the disposal of damaged or surplus organelles such as mitochondria, peroxisomes, lysosomes, endoplasmic reticulum, ribosomes, protein aggregates and also serves as a catabolic process providing nutrients through autodigestion at times of starvation. Autophagy has been implicated in cancer, neurodegeneration such as Alzheimer's disease, Huntington's disease and Parkinson's disease, diabetes, development, infections and immune diseases, as well as a process of relevance for aging.

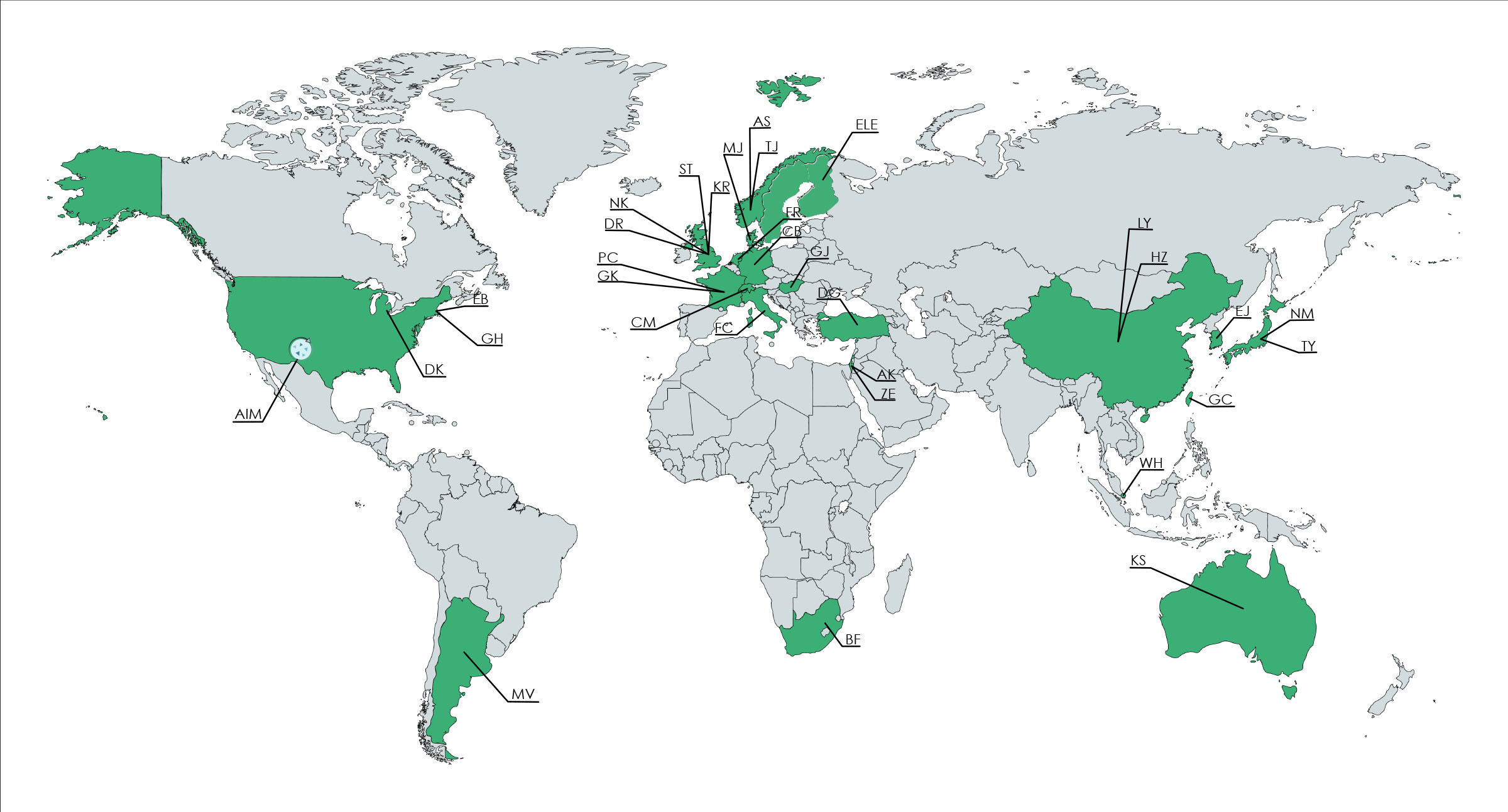
AIM center's International Council of Affiliate Members (ICAM). Details in Ref 1.

The purpose of the AIM center is to promote autophagy research at the international, national and regional levels and to provide resources to communities of scholars interested in this process in any context including basic science or translational research. AIM has scientific cores providing technical resources for study of autophagy, accessible to its members, associate members as well as to a group of international affiliate members. It provides a mentoring structure for support of junior faculty enrolled with the center and promotes collaborative multidisciplinary studies centered on the key thematic focus of the AIM center – fundamental study of autophagy and its role in disease. The AIM has International Council of Affiliate Members (ICAM) on all continents (see figure). The ICAM is complemented by the National Council of Affiliate (NCAM) members. NCAM is organized in sections by clinical disciplines/specialties, and at present has cardiology and nephrology sections.

The center hosts annual meetings and workshops with national and international reach and impact.

The AIM center leads and supports cutting edge research, including supporting research pilots for the COVID-19 pandemic.

The AIM center is hosting, together with the Journal of Cell Science, the 2020 international AIM eSymposium on covid, autophagy, inflammation and metabolism.

During Phase I, mentored junior faculty whose research projects and development as scientists has been directly supported by funding from the AIM center, have won seven independent R01 grants.

The AIM center support from NIH for Phase II has been received and the AIM center begins a new 5 year cycle starting September 1, 2022.
