= IRGM =

Protein-coding gene in the species Homo sapiens

Identifiers
- Aliases: IRGM, IFI1, IRGM1, LRG-47, LRG47, immunity-related GTPase M, immunity related GTPase M
- External IDs: OMIM: 608212; MGI: 1926262; GeneCards: IRGM

Gene location (Human)
Chr.	Chromosome 5 (human)
Band	5q33.1	Start	150,846,521 bp
Band	5q33.1	End	150,900,736 bp

Gene location (Mouse)
Chr.	Chromosome 11 (mouse)
Band	11|11 B1.3	Start	58,090,444 bp
Band	11|11 B1.3	End	58,113,608 bp
RNA expression pattern
Bgee	Human / Mouse (ortholog); Top expressed in: gonad; testicle; granulocyte; Achilles tendon; appendix; lymph node; stromal cell of endometrium; blood; smooth muscle tissue; gallbladder / Top expressed in: mesenteric lymph nodes; mucous cell of stomach; Paneth cell; left lobe of liver; lumbar spinal ganglion; spleen; iris; subcutaneous adipose tissue; ciliary body; blood; More reference expression data
BioGPS	n/a
Gene ontology
Molecular function	nucleotide binding; GTP binding; hydrolase activity; protein binding; protein kinase binding; protein serine/threonine kinase activator activity; CARD domain binding; BH3 domain binding; GTPase activity
Cellular component	phagocytic vesicle membrane; autophagosome membrane; cell projection; phagocytic cup; plasma membrane; membrane; cytoplasmic vesicle; Golgi membrane; mitochondrion; Golgi apparatus; cytosol; endoplasmic reticulum membrane
Biological process	autophagy; inflammatory response; immune system process; autophagosome assembly; positive regulation of protein phosphorylation; positive regulation of autophagy; positive regulation of peptidyl-threonine phosphorylation; protein destabilization; positive regulation of peptidyl-serine phosphorylation; regulation of protein-containing complex assembly; innate immune response; protein stabilization; defense response to Gram-negative bacterium; positive regulation of interferon-gamma-mediated signaling pathway; regulation of protein complex stability; protein lipidation involved in autophagosome assembly; CAMKK-AMPK signaling cascade; nucleotide-binding oligomerization domain containing 2 signaling pathway; cellular response to lipopolysaccharide; positive regulation of autophagosome maturation; positive regulation of protein serine/threonine kinase activity; defense response; cellular response to interferon-beta
Sources:Amigo / QuickGO
Orthologs
Databases	NCBI: entry; OMA: entry
Species	Human	Mouse
Entrez	345611	54396
Ensembl	ENSG00000237693	ENSMUSG00000069874
UniProt	A1A4Y4	Q9Z1M2
RefSeq (mRNA)	NM_001145805; NM_001346557	NM_019440
RefSeq (protein)	NP_001139277; NP_001333486	n/a
Location (UCSC)	Chr 5: 150.85 – 150.9 Mb	Chr 11: 58.09 – 58.11 Mb
PubMed search
- Wikidata
View/Edit Human	View/Edit Mouse

Immunity-related GTPase family M protein (IRGM), also known as interferon-inducible protein 1 (IFI1), is an enzyme that in humans is encoded by the IRGM gene.

IRGM is a member of the interferon-inducible GTPase family. The encoded protein may play a role in the innate immune response by regulating autophagy formation in response to intracellular pathogens.

The gene has been disabled by an Alu element for at least 25 million years in the primate lineage leading to great apes including humans, but it was re-enabled by an endogenous retrovirus called ERV-9.

== Clinical relevance ==
Polymorphisms that affect the normal expression of this gene are associated with a susceptibility to Crohn's disease and tuberculosis.
