= ATG9A =

Protein-coding gene in humans

Identifiers
- Aliases: ATG9A, APG9L1, MGD3208, mATG9, autophagy related 9A
- External IDs: OMIM: 612204; MGI: 2138446; GeneCards: ATG9A

Gene location (Human)
| Chr. | Chromosome 2 (human) |
| Band | 2q35 | Start | 219,219,380 bp |
| Band | 2q35 | End | 219,229,717 bp |

Gene location (Mouse)
| Chr. | Chromosome 1 (mouse) |
| Band | 1|1 C4 | Start | 75,157,504 bp |
| Band | 1|1 C4 | End | 75,168,840 bp |
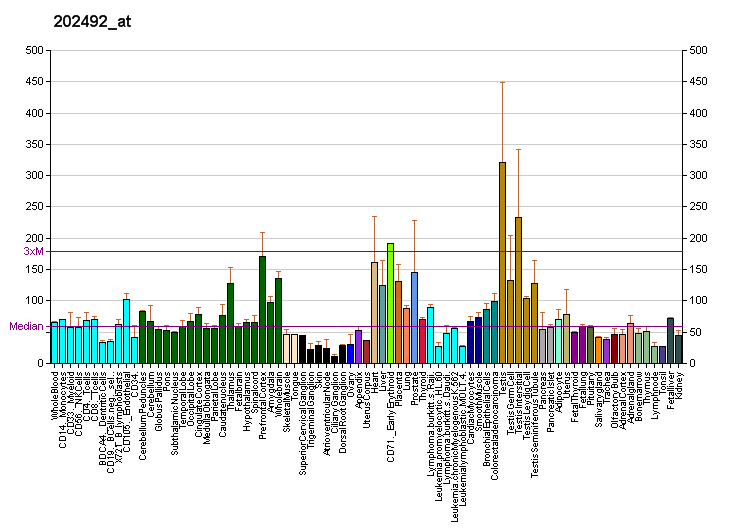
RNA expression pattern
| Bgee | Human / Mouse (ortholog); Top expressed in: gastrocnemius muscle; skeletal muscle tissue; apex of heart; muscle of thigh; left testis; right testis; blood; stromal cell of endometrium; left ventricle; prefrontal cortex / Top expressed in: muscle of thigh; testicle; skeletal muscle tissue; quadriceps femoris muscle; spermatid; granulocyte; striatum of neuraxis; superior frontal gyrus; primary visual cortex; cerebellar cortex; More reference expression data |
| BioGPS | More reference expression data |
Gene ontology
| Molecular function | protein binding |
| Cellular component | integral component of membrane; recycling endosome; endosome; late endosome; Golgi apparatus; endoplasmic reticulum membrane; membrane; late endosome membrane; phagophore assembly site; trans-Golgi network; autophagosome membrane; endoplasmic reticulum; cytoplasmic vesicle; autophagosome; intracellular membrane-bounded organelle; cytoplasmic vesicle membrane |
| Biological process | protein localization to phagophore assembly site; autophagosome assembly; autophagy; autophagy of mitochondrion; late nucleophagy; protein transport; response to nutrient levels; transport |
Sources:Amigo / QuickGO
Orthologs
| Databases | NCBI: entry; OMA: entry |
| Species | Human | Mouse |
| Entrez | 79065 | 245860 |
| Ensembl | ENSG00000198925 | ENSMUSG00000033124 |
| UniProt | Q7Z3C6 | Q68FE2 |
| RefSeq (mRNA) | NM_001077198; NM_024085 | NM_001003917; NM_001288612; NM_001288613 |
| RefSeq (protein) | NP_001070666; NP_076990; NP_001070666.1; NP_076990.4 | NP_001003917; NP_001275541; NP_001275542; NP_001395154; NP_001395156 NP_001395158; NP_001395159; NP_001395160 |
| Location (UCSC) | Chr 2: 219.22 – 219.23 Mb | Chr 1: 75.16 – 75.17 Mb |
| PubMed search |
- Wikidata
| View/Edit Human | View/Edit Mouse |

Autophagy-related protein 9A is a protein that in humans is encoded by the ATG9A gene.

Functional studies indicate that ATG9A plays a role in autophagy. and other non-autophagy membrane remodeling processes such as plasma membrane repair. Enzymatically, it is a lipid scramblase. ATG9A interacts with IQGAP1 and the ESCRT machinery in membrane remodeling.
