= Immunity-related GTPases =

Immunity-related guanosine triphosphatases (IRGs) are proteins activated as part of an early immune response. IRGs have been described in various mammals but are most well characterized in mice. IRG activation in most cases is induced by an immune response and leads to clearance of certain pathogens.

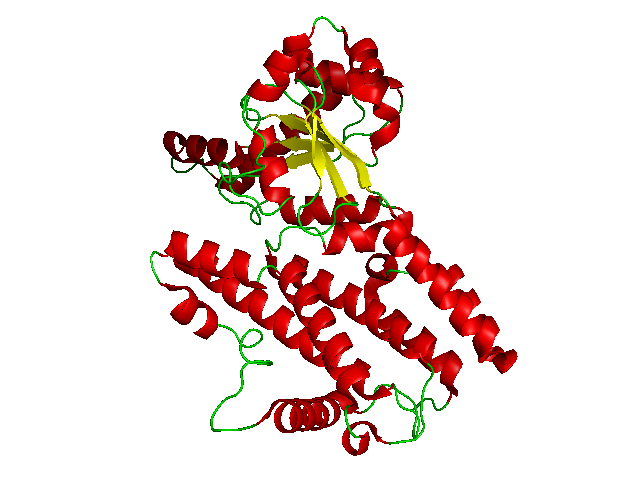
Figure 1: Crystal structure of a Mouse IRG (PDB id 1TQ6)

== Background ==
Interferon (IFN)-inducible GTPases encompass four families of proteins including myxovirus resistant proteins (Mx), guanylate-binding proteins (GBP), immunity-related GTPase proteins (IRGs), and very large inducible GTPase proteins (VLIG). IRGs confer resistance from vacuolar pathogens by localizing to and disrupting the phagocytic vacuole during infection. The activation of IRGs in mice is induced by interferon. IRG genes have been identified in various vertebrates and some invertebrates. They are involved in important immune defenses against intracellular pathogens and as a result have become a target for immune evasion by those pathogens. The intracellular protozoan parasite Toxoplasma gondii has been shown to target IRGs in mice allowing for resistance from the host immune response.

== Evolution of IRGs ==
Studies to determine the evolutionary origins of vertebrates have led to understanding the development of immune system processes and furthermore answer the questions of how and why pathogens have learned to evade and shut down these selectable genetic traits. Eight functional and four pseudo IRG genes have been identified in the invertebrate Branchiostoma floridiae. Li et al. determined expression patterns of functional IFN-inducible GTPase genes in Branchiostoma japonicum at various immunologic sites when induced by pathogens and pathogenic substances. This evidence suggests that IRGs may function in an immune-related capacity in cephalochordates. The paradox remains that these IRGs function without induction by IFN activation pathways, since B. japonicum and other amphioxus species do not possess IFN and IFN receptor genes. It is possible that IRGs may have existed prior to the Cambrian Explosion as an innate immune mechanism and with the evolution of the adaptive immune system in vertebrates, IFN evolved to modulate IRG function.

Vertebrates have evolved an array of IRG genes as a whole, potentially due to the evolution between variable pathogen interactions. The C57BL/6 mouse has 23 IRG genes of which 21 may be functional in resistance to pathogens (6 are well characterized), whereas humans have evolved only 1 functional IRG gene (IRGM) and one pseudogene. Studies in mice have characterized the importance of the type 2 effector molecule IFNγ in various cell types and gone on to determine the importance of these proteins in intracellular pathogen resistance.

Orthologous Irgc (a.k.a. Cinema) genes are found in humans and mice. These orthologs are not IFN inducible and are expressed only in the testis of both mammals. Multiple IRG genes have been identified in canines and zebrafish but few in the model organism Tetraodontidae (the pufferfish). IRG genes in humans are thought to have been lost in the divergence of primates. The variations between and within species suggest a high rate of evolutionary change for this particular element of host pathogen interaction and highlight the importance of understanding the limitations of using model systems to study human immunology.

== Mechanisms ==
Dependency on the IRGs is best exemplified in mouse studies. Multiple studies have been done using mouse knockout models to determine IRG function. Pathogen clearance mechanisms via lysosome maturation and vacuole destruction have been determined. Additionally, IRGs are implicated in the control of hematopoietic balance during infection. Irg1 knockout mice infected with Mycobacterium resulted in pancytopenia as a result of inadequate hematopoietic stem cell expansion.

== IRGs and mice ==
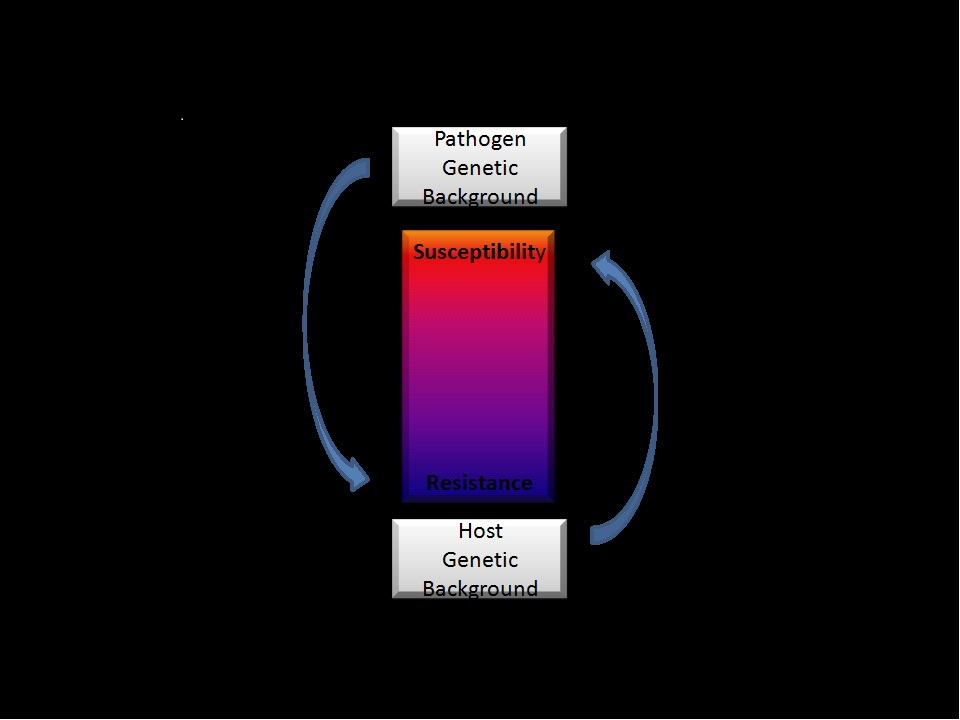
Figure 2: Effects of Genetic Polymorphisms. Host polymorphisms within the IRG loci can alter the ability of cells to eliminate the vacuolated pathogen. Alternatively pathogens containing coding variations in effector proteins can circumvent the cellular response to infection to generate a pathogen permissive environment.

The mouse genome encodes 23 IRGs, several of which have been demonstrated to be widely expressed (liver, heart, spleen, intestine, thymus, lung, testis, kidney, brain, skin) in a number of cell types, and are greatly up-regulated following exposure to the potent immune effector molecule interferon gamma, IFNγ. IRGs are subdivided into two additional classes based on the mode of activity and mechanism. The GSK class (Irga6, Irgb6, and Irgd) are considered the canonical grouping of GTPases, whereas a second grouping of GMS proteins, which have a lysine to methionine mutation in the active site, function to prevent premature activation by associating with the nucleotide binding motif in a manner similar to Guanosine nucleotide dissociation inhibitors (GDI's). The subcellular localization of IRGs are variable; Irga6 and Irgm3 are predominantly found within the endoplasmic reticulum, Irgm1 and Irgm2 have been localized to the Golgi apparatus, and at least two IRGs (Irgb6 and Irgd) have been found predominantly within the cytosol. Following cellular entry of Toxoplasma gondii, IRGs can quickly redistribute onto the parasitophorous vacuole membrane (PVM) within 2–30 minutes. The approximate order of decorating the PVM has been defined starting with the loading of Irgb6 and Irgb10 followed by Irga6, Irgd and Irgm2. Faint localization of Irgm3 on T. gondii vacuoles was also reported to occur in rare settings. Activation of the IRGs is thought to follow a GTP dependent cycle of IRG-IRG oligomerization. The loading of the "pioneer" IRGs onto the vacuole is thought to greatly enhance the recruitment of additional IRGs in a cooperative fashion.

Pathogens have co-evolved unique mechanisms to interfere with different steps leading up to the association of the full complement of IRGs needed to constitute a vacuolar destructive complex. One such example was elucidated by infection with virulent and recombinant, avirulent strains of T. gondii. The intricate mechanism demonstrates a co-evolving interaction between the two species. Type I T. gondii rhoptry effector molecule Rop18, a serine-threonine kinase, was recently shown to selectively phosphorylate and inactivate the "pioneer" IRGs, thereby preventing their assembly, activation and destruction of the T. gondii vacuole within monocytes.

In addition to the role of IRGs in T. gondii infection, clearance of Mycobacterium, Mtb, was also shown to be adversely affected in mice lacking Irgm1, a key negative regulatory IRG. The mechanism of clearance is thought to involve lipid interactions which aid in targeting the IRGs to Mtb containing phagosomes within macrophages.

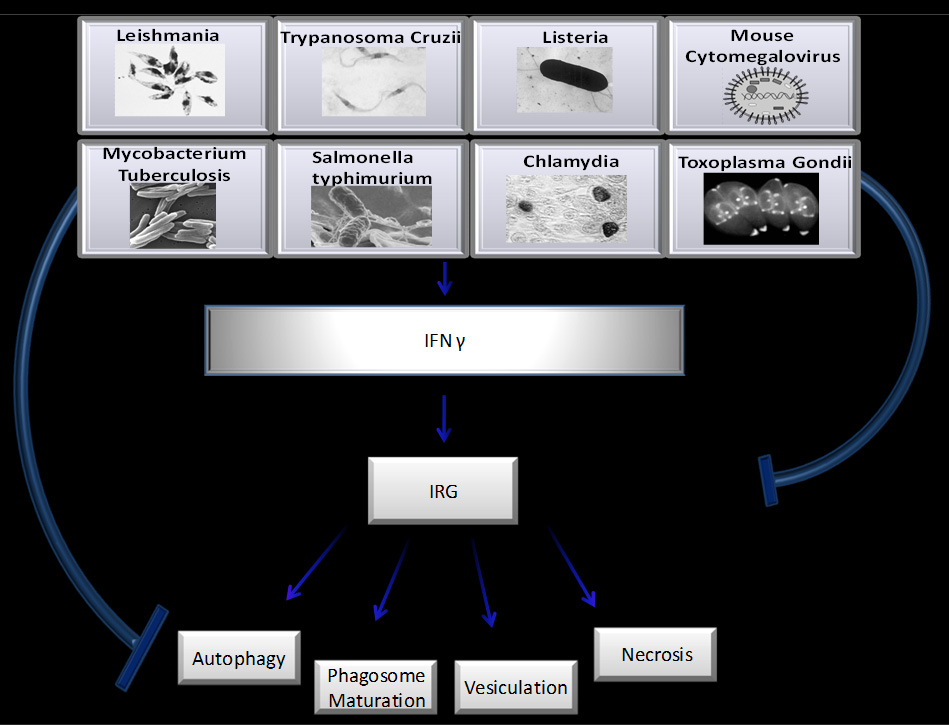
Figure 3: Following invasion by a number of obligate intracellular parasites, increases in interferon gamma lead to the increased synthesis of IRGs. The specific context and localization of the activated IRGs can lead to activation of several integrated cellular pathways resulting in either colonization of the host cell, death of the parasite, and / or death of the infected cell via one of the cell death pathways. A number of pathogens may also have effector molecules which can affect the activation of the cellular processes downstream of IRG activation.

Another example of the role of IRGs in the mouse model of infection is demonstrated by the differential recruitment of IRGs which alter the outcome of Chlamydia trachomatis, a human adapted, versus Chlamydia muridarum, mouse adapted, inclusions following entry. C. trachomatis inclusions recruit a full repertoire of IRGs which aid in the inclusion elimination via fusion with lysosomes. Regulation of IRG expression and activity in this model was found to be dependent both on levels of phospholipase C, cPLA2, as well as upstream IFN signaling. cPLA2 null mouse cells, when challenged with C. trachomatis, were less capable of clearing the pathogen compared to cells with proper cPLA2 expression. The model highlights the co-evolution demonstrated by effector molecules of C. muridarum functioning to restrict accumulation of mouse IRGs on inclusions by modifying Irgb10, whereas the human pathogen is incapable of modifying the mouse IRG response. This mechanism requires additional involvement of cellular autophagy machinery, which is in contrast to the necrotic pathway activation in T. gondii clearance. A refined mechanism will require additional studies to elucidate the cooperation between the autophagy machinery and IRGs involved in the fusion of bacterial inclusions with the lysosome, as well as the specific bacterial effector molecules used to manipulate the coordinated actions of IRGs.

In addition to the role of Irgm1 in parasite clearance, a cytoprotective role has been suggested in mature CD4+ T cells following exposure to IFNy in a TH1 response. Irgm1 null mice were reported to develop pancytopenia following infection with both Mycobacterium avium and Trypanosoma cruzi. This phenotype was reversed when presented in a double IFNγ/Irgm1 knockout model. These studies have provided evidence that the role of IRGs may prove to be not only spatially and temporally regulated in a highly coordinated manner, but that they have context specific auxiliary roles outside of the traditional phagolysosome development and maturation.

== IRGs and Humans ==
There are only three putative IRG genes in humans out of which IRGM is known to be an orthologue of mouse Irgm1. There are four isoforms of IRGM (a-d). Unlike mouse IRGs, human IRGM isoforms are always expressed under the human retrovirus element ERV9 and are independent of the levels of IFNγ. IRGMb and d have a putative G5 (SAK) motif in their C terminal tail region while the other two isoforms do not. IRGMd appears diffuse in the cytoplasm and be translocated to the mitochondria appearing as punctate dots. Additionally, it has been shown to bind to mitochondrial membrane lipid, cardiolipin and influence a change in the morphology of organelle. In general human IRGs have also been shown to affect several processes such as autophagy, mitochondrial fission, change in mitochondrial membrane potential and cell death.

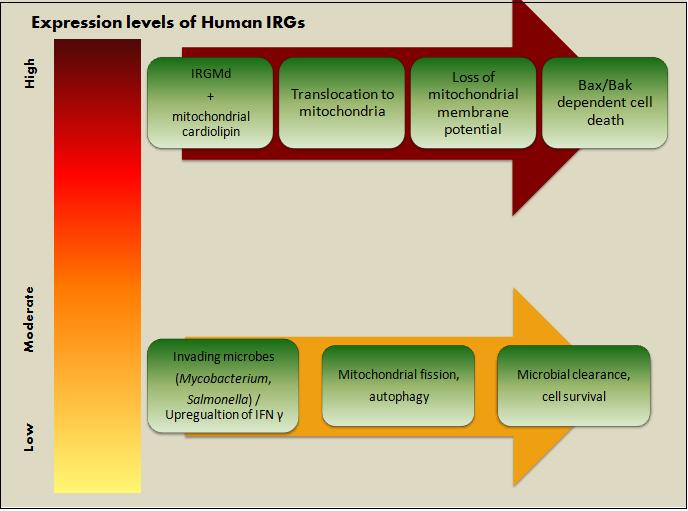
Figure 4: Putative mechanism of action of Human IRGM. Under moderate to low expression levels, IRGMs constantly survey for signals such as pathogen entry, starvation or increase in levels of IFNγ. Upon encounter with a pathogen, mitochondrial fission pathways are turned on leading to autophagy and microbial clearance promoting host cell survival. When highly expressed, IRGMd binds to the mitochondrial membrane bound lipid called cardiolipin and translocates into the mitochondria. This leads to depolarization, loss of mitochondrial membrane potential and stimulates pro-apoptotic Bax/Bak dependent host cell death.

Human IRGM like its mouse counterpart, has been shown to play a role in autophagy, the mechanism of which is not fully understood. LC3 is a microtubule associated soluble protein found in mammalian tissues. Cytoplasmic proteins and organelles are engulfed by autophagosomes which convert LC3-I to LC3-II. The presence of LC3-II serves as a marker for autophagy and can be detected by immunofluorescence or immunoblotting. IRGM helps to convert LC3-I to LC3-II in macrophages. IRGMs have a dual role. When expressed at very low levels, they serve to protect against intracellular pathogens but when isoforms a, c and d are over expressed it leads to cell death and inflammation.

Studies indicate that lack of IRGMs are risk factors for Crohn's disease and tuberculosis. Humans use IRGM as a defense mechanism against the intracellular bacteria Mycobacterium tuberculosis. It has been found to be important in phagosome maturation and in reducing the number of intracellular mycobacteria with the help of other mitochondrial fission proteins such as DRP1 and FIs1. Under certain conditions, mitochondrial fission and its associated proteins promote autophagy whereas mitochondrial fusion inhibits the same. Under autophagy inducing conditions, IRGM also increases ROS (Reactive Oxygen Species) production.

High levels of IRGMd triggers mitochondrial fission, leads to a loss of mitochondrial membrane potential and causes host cell death. Fission is also linked to mitochondrial Bax/Bak dependent apoptosis and IRGMd requires these proteins to be functional. Cell death by IRGM is independent of autophagy but depends on the above-mentioned pro-apoptotic factors instead. As a consequence of IRGM induced cell death, dying and necrotic cells release nuclear HMGB1, a pro-inflammatory alarmin, implicated in Crohn's disease.
