= MX1 =

Mammalian protein found in Homo sapiens

Identifiers
- Aliases: MX1, IFI-78K, IFI78, MX, MxA, MX dynamin like GTPase 1, lncMX1-215
- External IDs: OMIM: 147150; MGI: 97244; GeneCards: MX1
Available structures
PDB	Ortholog search: PDBe RCSB
PDB	List of PDB id codes 3LJB, 3SZR, 3ZYS, 4P4S, 4P4T, 4P4U

Gene location (Human)
Chr.	Chromosome 21 (human)
Band	21q22.3	Start	41,420,020 bp
Band	21q22.3	End	41,470,071 bp

Gene location (Mouse)
Chr.	Chromosome 16 (mouse)
Band	16 C4|16 57.51 cM	Start	97,336,508 bp
Band	16 C4|16 57.51 cM	End	97,362,100 bp
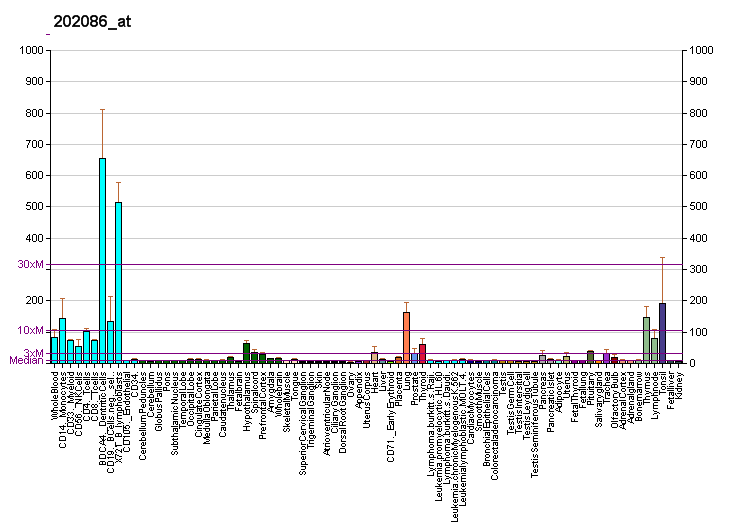
RNA expression pattern
Bgee	Human / Mouse (ortholog); Top expressed in: trigeminal ganglion; spinal ganglia; nasal epithelium; palpebral conjunctiva; monocyte; decidua; olfactory zone of nasal mucosa; granulocyte; spleen; human penis / Top expressed in: embryo; surface ectoderm; duodenum; thymus; choroid plexus of fourth ventricle; yolk sac; muscle of thigh; liver; islet of Langerhans; perirhinal cortex; More reference expression data
BioGPS	More reference expression data
Gene ontology
Molecular function	nucleotide binding; GTP binding; protein binding; GTPase activity; microtubule binding; identical protein binding
Cellular component	cytoplasm; cytosol; nuclear membrane; endoplasmic reticulum membrane; membrane; endoplasmic reticulum; perinuclear region of cytoplasm; nucleus; mitochondrial membranes
Biological process	defense response; immune system process; response to virus; type I interferon signaling pathway; innate immune response; signal transduction; apoptotic process; response to type I interferon; negative regulation of viral genome replication; mitochondrial fission; dynamin family protein polymerization involved in mitochondrial fission; membrane fusion; defense response to virus
Sources:Amigo / QuickGO
Orthologs
Databases	NCBI: entry; OMA: entry
Species	Human	Mouse
Entrez	4599	17858
Ensembl	ENSG00000157601	ENSMUSG00000023341
UniProt	P20591	Q9WVP9
RefSeq (mRNA)	NM_001144925; NM_001178046; NM_001282920; NM_002462	NM_013606
RefSeq (protein)	NP_001138397; NP_001171517; NP_001269849; NP_002453	NP_038634
Location (UCSC)	Chr 21: 41.42 – 41.47 Mb	Chr 16: 97.34 – 97.36 Mb
PubMed search
- Wikidata
View/Edit Human	View/Edit Mouse

Interferon-induced GTP-binding protein Mx1 is a protein that in humans is encoded by the MX1 gene.

In mice, the interferon-inducible Mx protein is responsible for a specific antiviral state against influenza virus infection. Furthermore, the human orthologue MxA is a major host determinant for influenza viruses of animal origin. The protein encoded by this gene is similar to the mouse protein as determined by its antigenic relatedness, induction conditions, physicochemical properties, and amino acid analysis. This cytoplasmic protein is a member of both the dynamin superfamily and the family of large GTPases.
