= KBM-7 cells =

KBM-7 cells are a chronic myelogenous leukemia (CML) cell line used for biomedical research. Like all cancer cell lines, it is immortal and can divide indefinitely. A unique aspect of the KBM-7 cell line is that it is near-haploid, meaning it contains only one copy for most of its chromosomes. Human chromosomes are typically diploid, meaning that there are two copies of each chromosome.

== Origin ==
KBM-7 cells were derived from a 39-year-old man with chronic myeloid leukemia in blast crisis. The original cell line contained both near haploid and hyperdiploid clones. Subsequent subcloning yielded a pure near-haploid cell line (subclone P1-55). Genome analysis has revealed that besides the disomic chromosome 8, a 30 megabase fragment of chromosome 15 is present in two copies. Like other CML cells lines (e.g., K562) KBM-7 cells are positive for the Philadelphia chromosome harboring the BCR-ABL oncogenic fusion.

=== Karyotype ===
Subclone P1-55 has been described as having a karyotype of "25,XY,+8,Ph(+)", meaning that it has 25 chromosomes, including one copy of everything from 1–22, X, and Y,an extra copy of 8, and that it has the Philadelphia rearrangement. Under International System for Human Cytogenomic Nomenclature rules of 2024, this should be written 25,X,+Y,t(9;22)(q34;q11). Taking into account other known variations, the full karyotype is ish 25,X,+Y,+8,t(9;22)(q34;q11),ins(19;15)(p13.1;q22q25). seq inv(12)(12q14.2), arr[GRCh37] 8×2,15q(61109318_89880624)×2,11p(46442526_46578400)×0. This notation describes the insertion of a part of Chr 15 onto chromosome 19; an inversion on Chr 12 detected by sequencing (affecting PPM1H and SRGAP1); duplication of Chr 8 and a part of Chr 15 detected by microarray; and deletion of a part Chr 11 detected by microarray (including AMBRA1).

Loss of the Y chromosome frequently happens.

=== Derived cell lines ===
KBM-7 cells have been reprogrammed to yield the HAP1 cell line. It has a fibroblast-like phenotype, expresses no blood cell markers, and has lost the extra copy of Chr 8 and the only copy of Chr Y.

== Cultivation and applications ==
KBM-7 cells grow in suspension and are maintained in Iscove's Modified Dulbecco's Medium (IMDM) supplemented with 10% fetal bovine serum. They divide approximately every 24 hours.

KBM-7 has found applications in a variety of genomic research studies; the cell line has been examined in gene silencing experiments, been reprogrammed to become a stem cell line, and served as a test model for novel drug candidates.

== Significance ==
One method of studying gene function involves "knocking out" the gene by inducing a mutation. This causes the resulting gene product to be nonfunctional, and researchers can then see how this effects the cell's function as a whole. Many gene editing procedures have very low efficiency, and often both copies of mammalian chromosomes must be knocked out in order to see a phenotypic effect. Having a near-haploid cell line such as KBM-7 greatly increases the efficiency of these studies because there is only one gene that must be knocked out.
