= HAP1 cells =

HAP1 cells are a near-haploid immortalized cell line of human origin. It is used in biomedical and genetic research. Cells smaller than the average human cell, growing to about 11 micrometers in diameter. They grow adherently and resemble fibroblasts. HAP1 inherits its immortality (ability to divide indefinitely) from its ancestor, a line of leukemia cells called KBM-7.

== Lineage and karyotype ==
The ancestor of HAP1 is the KBM-7 cell line, derived from a patient with chronic myeloid leukemia (CML). The P1-55 subclone of KBM-7 has a karyotype of 25,XY,+8,Ph(+): (Note: Under International System for Human Cytogenomic Nomenclature rules of 2024, this should be written 25,X,+Y,t(9;22)(q34;q11).) this means that it has one each of chromosome 1–7, 9–23, X, and Y, two copies of chromosome 8, and that chromosome 9 and chromosome 22 has undergone a translocation to create the Philadelphia chromosome. Philly chromosomes are created when the tips of chromosomes 9 and 22 swap places. Most genes end up untouched, but the proteins BCR and ABL1 ends up fused together to create a signal for cancerous replication. Since the 2000s "KBM-7" almost exclusively refers to one similar to P1-55 as diploid ones were simply not as interesting. KBM-7 has a tendency to lose its Y chromosome.

In 2010 Carette et al. attempted to induce pluripotency in a near-haploid population of KBM-7 by inserting the four Yamanaka factors using a retrovirus vector. One failed run resulted in a fibroblast-like phenotype with adherent growth and expressing no blood cell (hematopoietic) markers. The Carette group called this line HAP1. Proper HAP1 cells were 23,X,Ph(+), having lost the extra copy of chromosome 8. There are also smaller populations with the KBM-7/P1-55 karyotype as well as a doubled version of it. This HAP1 line of human cells where most genes are present only as one copy is useful for analyzing the effects of singular genes, as the Carette group had demonstrated in the works published in 2011.

In 2013 Essletzbichler et al. used spectral karyotyping to more precisely analyze the karyotype of HAP1. They found that HAP1 actually had an extra copy of a small (30 megabase) portion of chromosome fused to the middle of chromosome 9. They used CRISPR-Cas9 to cut around the duplicated sequence and looked for clones that deleted the additional copy (instead of the original copy) and called the fully haploid results engineered HAP1 (eHAP1), specifically clones E9 and A11. Whole-genome sequencing revealed that the eHAP1 still retained 6 kilobases of chr 15 on chr 19 because the cut sites were originally determined using less precise data.

Considering the 2013 discovery, the karyotype of HAP1 under the standard cytogenetic notation is: ish 23,X,t(9;22)(q34;q11),ins(19;15)(p13.1;q22q25)(537K8+,43K17+,wcp15+). seq[GRCh37] 15q22.2q26.1(61103219_89893074)×2. An inversion of 12q14.2 (affecting PPM1H and SRGAP1) and a deletion of 11p11.2 (including AMBRA1) has been reported for the parent cell line, but it is not stated whether it has been detected in HAP1 in the sequencing studies.

== Characteristics ==
Unlike KBM-7, Carette's HAP1 does not resemble blood cells and instead act like fibroblasts. They grow adherently (sticks to surfaces). They have a doubling time of 48 h. They are much more amenable to transfection than the diploid cell lines.

Carette et al. 2010 had noted the not-quite-pluripotent cells reprogrammed from KBM7 were unlike their cancerous progenitors in that they do not grow any differently when an anti-cancer drug that targets BCR-ABL is added, indicating that they no longer use the oncogene as a routine part of their replication. Their differentiated forms (fibroblst-like, neuroepithelium, neurons) also inherited this "cure" from oncogene addiction. It is likely that HAP1 is also non-addicted.

HAP1 has a tendency to kill itself during or immediately after mitosis. The mitotic spindle is not as good at segregating haploid sister chromatids from each other than between diploids, resulting in prolonged mitosis and frequently activation of the p53 system leading to apoptosis. Microtubule poisons such as taxol amplify this effect. This activation reduces the growth of haploid cells in favor of those that have spontaneously reverted to diploid; at population scale the culture just "turns diploid". Knocking out p53 prevents most of the mitosis-associated deaths and allows the culture to stay haploid for longer. (The p53 system in HAP1 is partially functional with a known point mutation in the TP53 gene. Knocking out p53 also results in a small but measurable increase in survival under the DNA crosslinker mitomycin C.)

HAP1 displays some chromosomal instability. In addition to the aforementioned tendency to diploidize, they also exhibit structural and numeric instabilities. As a result, there are several sub-lines each with their own derived features.

== Biomedical research ==
Because almost every gene is only present in one copy in HAP1, it is much easier to ensure that a genetic change affected all copies of a gene in a cell. Due to the quick growth and relative gene dosages, consequences of mutations also tent do show up faster. Diploidy and slow growth are historically the two main factors that slowed down the research into in vitro animal cell biology when compared to the better-studied microbes.

A 2026 preprint reports a large-scale deletion scanning experiment where a Type I-C CRISPR-Cas3 enzyme was used to produce many different deletions in the HAP1 genome. The resultant cells were grown and sequenced to reveal which deletions still allowed the cells to grow, an approach the researchers call shred-seq. The results indicate that the haploid HAP1 is a lot more resistant to gene deletion than diploid HAP1 cells, with 50–96% of the sampled regions being dispensable in culture.

=== Other haploid mammalian cells ===
Potentially even more useful than a line of differentiated haploid cells is a line of haploid embryonic stem cells able to differentiated into anything. This was achieved in fish in 2009, mice in 2011, monkeys in 2013, rats in 2014, and finally humans in 2016. The parthenogenetic type (containing DNA from an egg cell, a distinction made relevant by genomic imprinting) is generally made by tricking the egg into believing that it was fertilized. The androgenetic (containing DNA from a sperm cell) type is made by transferring the sperm nucleus into a denucleated egg cell.
