= Autophagy-related protein 101 =

Protein-coding gene in the species Homo sapiens

ATG101

Identifiers
- Aliases: ATG101, C12orf44, autophagy related 101
- External IDs: OMIM: 615089; MGI: 1915368; GeneCards: ATG101
Available structures
PDB	Ortholog search: PDBe RCSB
PDB	List of PDB id codes 4WZG, 5C50

Gene location (Human)
Chr.	Chromosome 12 (human)
Band	12q13.13	Start	52,069,246 bp
Band	12q13.13	End	52,077,495 bp

Gene location (Mouse)
Chr.	Chromosome 15 (mouse)
Band	15|15 F1	Start	101,182,153 bp
Band	15|15 F1	End	101,188,826 bp
RNA expression pattern
Bgee	Human / Mouse (ortholog); Top expressed in: stromal cell of endometrium; parotid gland; mucosa of transverse colon; body of stomach; skin of abdomen; skin of leg; gallbladder; islet of Langerhans; left testis; granulocyte / Top expressed in: granulocyte; morula; otic vesicle; muscle of thigh; saccule; right kidney; lip; dentate gyrus of hippocampal formation granule cell; embryo; otic placode; More reference expression data
BioGPS	n/a
Gene ontology
Molecular function	protein binding; identical protein binding; protein-containing complex binding
Cellular component	cytoplasm; cytosol; phagophore assembly site; endoplasmic reticulum membrane
Biological process	autophagy; macroautophagy; autophagosome assembly; regulation of macroautophagy
Sources:Amigo / QuickGO
Orthologs
Databases	NCBI: entry; OMA: entry
Species	Human	Mouse
Entrez	60673	68118
Ensembl	ENSG00000123395	ENSMUSG00000037204
UniProt	Q9BSB4	Q9D8Z6
RefSeq (mRNA)	NM_021934; NM_001098673	NM_026566
RefSeq (protein)	NP_001092143; NP_068753	NP_080842
Location (UCSC)	Chr 12: 52.07 – 52.08 Mb	Chr 15: 101.18 – 101.19 Mb
PubMed search
- Wikidata
View/Edit Human	View/Edit Mouse

Autophagy-related protein 101 also known as ATG101 is a protein that in humans is encoded by the C12orf44 gene (chromosome 12 open reading frame 44).

Autophagy is the process of sequestering target proteins, organelles, aggregates, and other cytoplasmic species inside large membrane-bound vesicles and delivering them to lysosomes for degradation. The ATG101 protein is localized in the cytoplasm, but can possibly also be found bound to a structure known as a phagophore, involved in the initial steps of autophagy. The gene is highly conserved among mammals, as well as showing conservation among most eukaryotes. It is thought to directly interact with ATG13 in the ULK1 complex, which may be important for activating phagophores.

== Function ==
ATG101 is one of dozens of diverse proteins named for their involvement in autophagy, a process well conserved among most eukaryotic organisms. However, ATG101 is not homologous to any of the other ATG proteins. ATG101 interacts with essential autophagy protein ATG13 in mammals, which is an ULK1-interacting protein. ULK1 (unc-51-like kinase 1) is thought to be important in the activation of macroautophagy in mammals. ATG101 is suggested to protect ATG13 from proteasomal degradation, thereby stabilizing levels of ATG13 found in cells and regulating levels of macroautophagy. According to published papers, ATG101 is said to localize to the isolation membrane, also known as the phagophore. This attachment to the phagophore could possibly explain the palmitoylation site found on the third amino acid, which is a cysteine. Phagophores are responsible for recognizing and surrounding materials that are to be degraded in the lysosome.

== Protein properties ==
Protein of unknown function DUF1649

Identifiers
- Symbol: DUF1649
- Pfam: PF07855
- InterPro: IPR012445
Available protein structures:
- PDB: IPR012445 PF07855 (ECOD; PDBsum)
- AlphaFold: IPR012445; PF07855

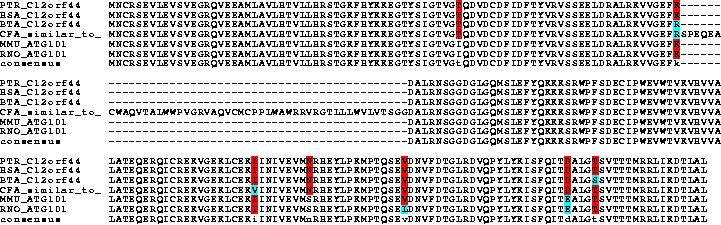
Sequence conservation can be seen in this alignment of various mammals including dog, cow, mouse, rat, and chimpanzees.

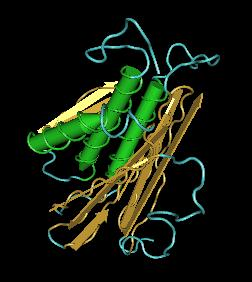
The structure of the spindle assembly checkpoint protein Mad2, predicted to be 95% similar to ATG101. This is the closest known estimate to the structure of the novel protein ATG101.

The ATG101 protein contains an domain DUF1649 (domain of unknown function 1649).

ATG101 is highly conserved among most vertebrates, including animals such as mice, whose common ancestor with humans was thought to have diverged between 65 and 85 million years ago. This may be evidence that ATG101 is significant in a way that it must remain conserved structurally in order to retain function. Only 2 missense SNPs are known in the DNA sequence for ATG101, showing that no other versions of this protein exist, also suggesting its structural importance.

In this conceptual translation, the palmitoylation site on the third amino acid can be seen, as well as a possible phosphorylation site shown surrounded by brackets. The amino acids are aligned above the coding region of the mRNA, which is also numbered on the sides. In ATG101, this protein is valine-rich.

== Gene expression ==
No concrete data is present establishing ATG101 in any particular area. By looking at multiple expression sets in both humans and mice, it has been hypothesized to be ubiquitously expressed in tissues.

== Gene neighborhood ==
- GRASP GRP1 (general receptor for phosphoinositides 1)-associated scaffold protein -

Codes for a general receptor protein that is relatively unknown, located on the same strand as C12orf44 as seen below, spans 8924 bp.

- NR4A1 (nuclear receptor subfamily 4, group A, member 1) -

This gene encodes nerve growth factor IB that is a member of the steroid-thyroid hormone-retinoid receptor superfamily. Expression is induced by phytohemagglutinin in human lymphocytes and by serum stimulation of arrested fibroblasts. The encoded protein acts as a nuclear transcription factor. Translocation of the protein from the nucleus to mitochondria induces apoptosis. Location is on the same strand as C12orf44, spans 8097 bp.

- OR7E47P (olfactory receptor, family 7, subfamily E, member 47 pseudogene) -

Olfactory receptors interact with odorant molecules in the nose, to initiate a neuronal response that triggers the perception of a smell. The olfactory receptor proteins are members of a large family of G-protein-coupled receptors (GPCR) arising from single coding-exon genes. Olfactory receptors share a 7-transmembrane domain structure with many neurotransmitter and hormone receptors and are responsible for the recognition and G protein-mediated transduction of odorant signals. Located after C12orf44 on the chromosome, it lies on the same strand and is 946 bp in length.

- KRT80 (keratin 80) -

This gene encodes an epithelial keratin that is weakly expressed in the tongue. It is located on the opposite strand to C12orf44 and is 23,005 bp long.
