= Cytoplasm-to-vacuole targeting =

Autophagy-related pathway in yeast

Cytoplasm-to-vacuole targeting (CVT) is an autophagy-related pathway which occurs in fungi and specifically yeasts. This is a mechanism occurs under starvation conditions and moves molecules from the cytoplasm to vacuoles. This pathway is a production of complex molecules resulting in the digestion of cytoplasm components. Cell cytoplasm and vacuoles play key roles in this pathway and are primarily responsible for its function.

The acronym CVT stands for Cytoplasm Vacuole Targeting. This pathway consists of components from the cytoplasm which are targeted for transport to cell vacuoles and digested.

== CVT pathway ==
The CVT pathway targets the enzymes alpha-mannosidase and aminopeptidase I (Ape I). These hydrolases are present within the cytoplasm of cells, hence why they are selected and targeted for vacuole delivery and digestion.

During this process cells digest components of their own cytoplasm. This is done with through the use of enzymes, specifically hydrolases. These are enzymes specifically designated for catalyzing molecule breakdown through the addition of water. Under vegetative conditions it delivers the hydrolase aminopeptidase 1 (Ape1), to the vacuole. Hydrolases are a class of enzymes which serve as catalysts for biochemical reactions; speeding up reaction rates. The main function of Hydrolases is to break down nutrients into smaller components to be easily digested, through the use of water to break bonds.

These components make the CVT pathway the only known biosynthetic pathway to utilize the machinery of autophagy for operation.

== Organelles ==
The cytoplasm and vacuole of cells are two very important organelles, designed to carry out many biological cell functions. The cytoplasm of a cell fills the interior spaces of a cell and is responsible for holding organelles in place, protecting the cell and is where many biochemical interactions occur-including transport, and protein folding. Vacuoles are membrane bound organelles and is responsible for holding of excess water and removal of waste. Understanding the functions of these organelles is imperative for understanding their complex relationship that occurs in the Cytoplasm to Vacuole Targeting Pathway (CVT).

== In yeast ==
One of the main organisms in which the CVT pathway occurs is in fungi- in the form of yeasts. Saccharomyces cerevisiae (S. cerevisiae) is a main source of nutritional yeast, where this pathway is common. In yeasts CVT pathway uses selective targeting for hydrolases alpha-mannosidase and aminopeptidase I (Ape I). These are present in yeast cytoplasm and are selected for transport to the cells vacuole where they are digested.
