= GABARAPL2 =

Protein-coding gene in the species Homo sapiens

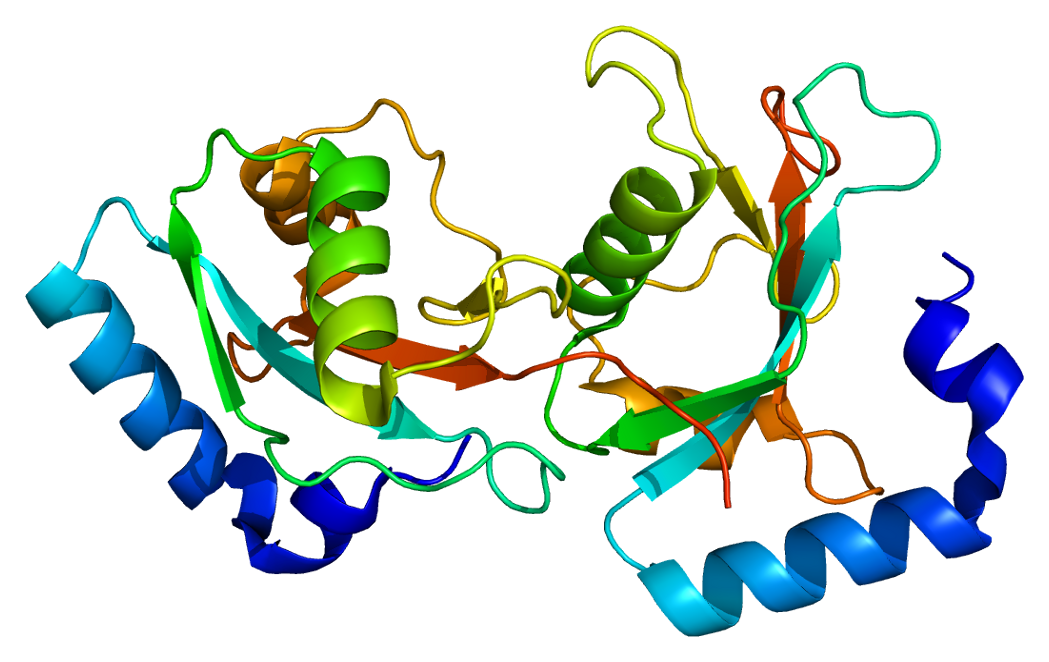

Identifiers
- Aliases: GABARAPL2, ATG8, ATG8C, GATE-16, GATE16, GEF-2, GEF2, GABA type A receptor associated protein like 2
- External IDs: OMIM: 607452; MGI: 1890602; GeneCards: GABARAPL2
Available structures
PDB	Ortholog search: PDBe RCSB
PDB	List of PDB id codes 4CO7

Gene location (Human)
Chr.	Chromosome 16 (human)
Band	16q23.1	Start	75,566,375 bp
Band	16q23.1	End	75,577,881 bp

Gene location (Mouse)
Chr.	Chromosome 8 (mouse)
Band	8|8 E1	Start	112,667,335 bp
Band	8|8 E1	End	112,680,244 bp
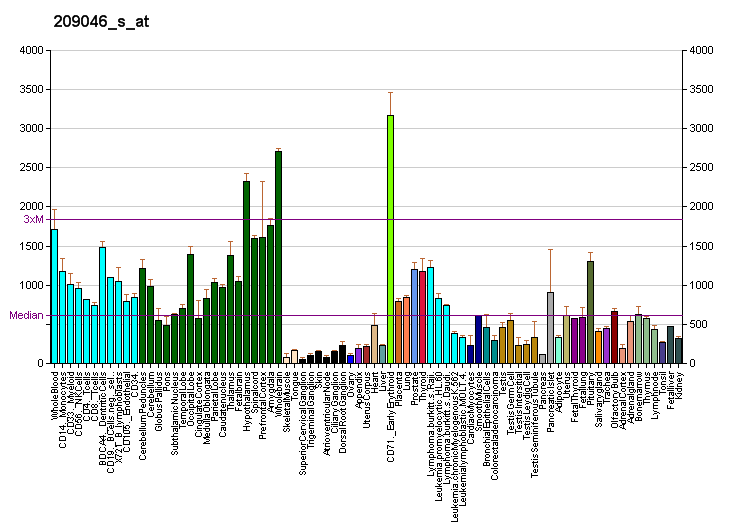
RNA expression pattern
Bgee	Human / Mouse (ortholog); Top expressed in: pons; Brodmann area 46; cerebellar vermis; internal globus pallidus; superior vestibular nucleus; hypothalamus; subthalamic nucleus; spinal cord; C1 segment; nucleus accumbens / Top expressed in: hypothalamus; neural tube; cerebellar cortex; ganglionic eminence; blastocyst; morula; dentate gyrus of hippocampal formation granule cell; right kidney; Cortex of frontal lobe; bone marrow; More reference expression data
BioGPS	More reference expression data
Gene ontology
Molecular function	GABA receptor binding; microtubule binding; ATPase binding; protein binding; beta-tubulin binding; SNARE binding; ubiquitin protein ligase binding
Cellular component	cytoplasm; Golgi apparatus; Golgi membrane; intracellular anatomical structure; autophagosome; autophagosome membrane; cytoplasmic vesicle; cytosol
Biological process	positive regulation of ATP-dependent activity; autophagy; protein transport; negative regulation of proteasomal protein catabolic process; intra-Golgi vesicle-mediated transport; macroautophagy; autophagosome maturation; autophagosome assembly; autophagy of mitochondrion; cellular response to nitrogen starvation
Sources:Amigo / QuickGO
Orthologs
Databases	NCBI: entry; OMA: entry
Species	Human	Mouse
Entrez	11345	93739
Ensembl	ENSG00000034713	ENSMUSG00000031950
UniProt	P60520	P60521
RefSeq (mRNA)	NM_007285	NM_026693
RefSeq (protein)	NP_009216	NP_080969
Location (UCSC)	Chr 16: 75.57 – 75.58 Mb	Chr 8: 112.67 – 112.68 Mb
PubMed search
- Wikidata
View/Edit Human	View/Edit Mouse

Gamma-aminobutyric acid receptor-associated protein-like 2 is a protein that in humans is encoded by the GABARAPL2 gene.

== Interactions ==
GABARAPL2 has been shown to interact with ULK1, ATG4B, and FAM134B.
