= AMBRA1 =

Protein-coding gene

Identifiers
- Aliases: AMBRA1, DCAF3, WDR94, autophagy and beclin 1 regulator 1
- External IDs: OMIM: 611359; MGI: 2443564; GeneCards: AMBRA1

Gene location (Human)
Chr.	Chromosome 11 (human)
Band	11p11.2	Start	46,396,414 bp
Band	11p11.2	End	46,594,125 bp

Gene location (Mouse)
Chr.	Chromosome 2 (mouse)
Band	2|2 E1	Start	91,560,479 bp
Band	2|2 E1	End	91,749,194 bp
RNA expression pattern
Bgee	Human / Mouse (ortholog); Top expressed in: oocyte; secondary oocyte; vena cava; tendon of biceps brachii; nipple; mucosa of pharynx; cerebellar vermis; cardia; ventral tegmental area; thymus / Top expressed in: zygote; primary oocyte; lateral septal nucleus; habenula; subiculum; mammillary body; cerebellar vermis; anterior amygdaloid area; lateral geniculate nucleus; lobe of cerebellum; More reference expression data
BioGPS	n/a
Gene ontology
Molecular function	protein binding; ubiquitin protein ligase binding; GTPase binding
Cellular component	cytoplasm; autophagosome; mitochondrial outer membrane; phagocytic vesicle; mitochondrion; perinuclear region of cytoplasm; axoneme; cytoplasmic vesicle; cytosol
Biological process	negative regulation of neuron apoptotic process; cell differentiation; nervous system development; positive regulation of phosphatidylinositol 3-kinase activity; autophagy; multicellular organism development; neural tube development; macroautophagy; negative regulation of cell population proliferation; cellular response to starvation; positive regulation of autophagy; negative regulation of cardiac muscle cell apoptotic process; response to nutrient levels; autophagosome assembly; autophagy of mitochondrion; mitophagy; response to mitochondrial depolarisation
Sources:Amigo / QuickGO
Orthologs
Databases	NCBI: entry; OMA: entry
Species	Human	Mouse
Entrez	55626	228361
Ensembl	ENSG00000110497	ENSMUSG00000040506
UniProt	Q9C0C7	A2AH22
RefSeq (mRNA)	NM_001267782; NM_001267783; NM_001300731; NM_017749; NM_001367468 NM_001367469; NM_001367470; NM_001367471; NM_001387011	NM_001080754; NM_172669
RefSeq (protein)	NP_001254711; NP_001254712; NP_001287660; NP_060219; NP_001354397 NP_001354398; NP_001354399; NP_001354400	NP_001074223; NP_766257
Location (UCSC)	Chr 11: 46.4 – 46.59 Mb	Chr 2: 91.56 – 91.75 Mb
PubMed search
- Wikidata
View/Edit Human	View/Edit Mouse

AMBRA1 (activating molecule in Beclin1-regulated autophagy) is a protein that is able to regulate cancer cells through autophagy. AMBRA1 is described as a mechanism cells use to divide and there is new evidence demonstrating the role and impact of AMBRA1 as a candidate for the treatment of several disorders and diseases, including anticancer therapy. It is known to suppress tumors and plays a role in mitophagy and apoptosis. AMBRA1 can be found in the cytoskeleton and mitochondria and during the process of autophagy, it is localized at the endoplasmic reticulum. In normal conditions, AMBRA1 is dormant and will bind to BCL2 in the outer membrane. This relocation enables autophagosome nucleation. AMBRA1 protein is involved in several cellular processes and is involved in the regulation of the immune system and nervous system.

== Function ==
AMBRA1 serves to regulate the process of autophagy and this is the cellular breakdown and recycling of unnecessary or damaged cellular components. This protein interacts with other proteins and genes to initiate the formation of autophagosomes, an essential component of autophagy. Cellular processes such as cell proliferation, apoptosis, and cellular metabolism are regulated through the interactions between AMBRA1 and other proteins. AMBRA1 is involved in regulating the cell cycle and it recognizes and binds to D-type cyclins which promotes cell proliferation. This leads to cyclin-D degradation where AMBRA1 suppresses tumors, prevents their growth, and promotes genetic integrity. AMBRA1 is also known to mediate polyubiquitylation of several proteins. Bartolomeo et al. demonstrated AMBRA1 signals the motor complex to initiate autophagy when it is released from microtubules. Through autophagy, cellular homeostasis is maintained, and the buildup of toxic or damaged proteins is prevented. Reynolds(2021) shows the repercussions of the loss of AMBRA1, which can no longer control the cell cycle from uncontrolled cell division and growth. One of the interactions AMBRA1 has with Beclin1 aids in cell proliferation and protein replacement during neural development. AMBRA1 is able to promote activity in PIK3C3, increase kinase activity during autophagy, and activate ULK1. AMBRA1 promotes FOXO3 and Nazio et al. (2021) showed when AMBRA1 is reduced, there is inhibition of STAT3 signaling which reduces the regulation of innate and adaptive immunity. In addition, AMBRA1 is an essential component for STAT3 signaling as FOXO3 regulates gene expression in autophagy.

== Mechanism ==
The exact mechanisms of this protein are not yet fully understood. Several processes including autophagy and apoptosis are some that AMBRA1 is involved with. Through the formation of autophagosomes, structures that engulf cellular components to break them down, autophagy is initiated. AMBRA1 regulates the activity of the mTORC1 complex and this complex serves as a regulator of cell metabolism and growth. Apart from autophagy, AMBRA1 plays an essential role in apoptosis and cell proliferation. For enabling cell death, the p53 pathway is activated and this is done upon the release of cytochrome C from mitochondria. AMBRA1 has been a topic of research for anti-cancer therapies through the regulation of the immune system. AMBRA1 is additionally involved in the development of the nervous system through the regulation of biological processes involving Parkinson's disease and other neurodegenerative disorders.

== Interactions ==
Simoneschi et al. demonstrated that there is an interaction between AMBRA1 and the cyclin-D pathway. D-type cyclins activate CDK4 and CDK6 and AMBRA1 protein targets these cyclins for degradation. The decrease in AMBRA1 proteins showed the prevention of polyubiquitylation of cyclin D1. The interactions provide evidence that AMBRA1 plays a role in the regulation of different cellular processes such as autophagy, cell proliferation, apoptosis, and metabolism. AMBRA1 interacts with Beclin1 and ULK1 to initiate autophagy and form autophagosomes. The interaction with ULK1 also regulates cell proliferation. AMBRA1 interacts with Bcl2 and mito-and this aids in regulating and promoting apoptosis. There is a correlation between apoptosis and autophagy where AMBRA1 is released from Bcl2 when autophagy takes place. This process increases Beclin1 activity and Strappazzon et al. found that the interactions are reduced during apoptosis. When AMBRA1 interacts with DLC1, a complex associated with cell division, the complex is moved to the endoplasmic reticulum and the complex is harnessed to the cytoskeleton. AMBRA1 also interacts with the protein phosphatase 2A (PPP2CA) and this promotes MYC dephosphorylation and degradation. MYC is an oncogene and when degraded, it results in tumor suppression. The interactions with AMBRA1 and other proteins suggest the importance of AMBRA1 in cellular processes.

== Clinical significance ==
AMBRA1 is clinically significant due to the importance of this protein in cellular processes such as apoptosis and cell proliferation. Diseases such as cancer, neurodegenerative disorders and autoimmune diseases can arise. Frias et al., through studies concluded that the deletion of AMBRA1 results in the inhibition of tumors and melanoma and reduced cytokine-mediated signaling. Tumorigenisis and tumor proliferation takes place when AMBRA1 fails to interact and promote the degradation of cyclin D. Diseases such as Alzheimer's disease, Parkinson's disease, and Huntington's disease contain autophagy alterations. AMBRA1 plays a role in the development of Parkinson's disease and in interacting with Parkin, an E3 ubiquitin ligase, there is inhibition of Parkin mitophagy. AMBRA1 is involved in the regulation of the immune system and upcoming research demonstrates this protein might play a role in the development of autoimmune diseases since AMBRA1 is involved in autophagy. Understanding the functions of AMBRA1 and the role it plays in disease pathogenesis provide insight into the development of new treatment and therapies for the listed disorders.
