= Aminopeptidase III =

Aminopeptidase III may refer to one of two enzymes:

- Leucyl aminopeptidase
- Aminopeptidase I
