= ATG4B =

Protein-coding gene in humans

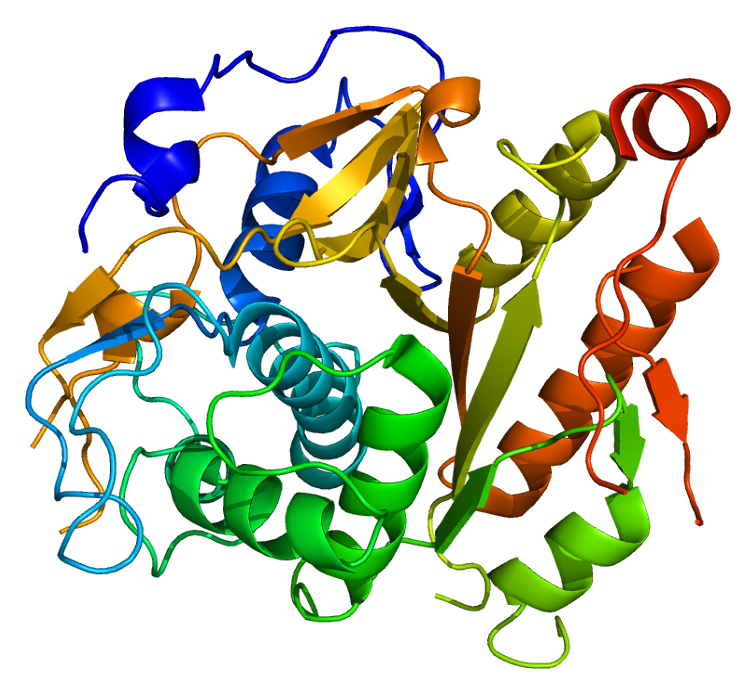

Identifiers
- Aliases: ATG4B, APG4B, AUTL1, autophagy related 4B cysteine peptidase, HsAPG4B
- External IDs: OMIM: 611338; MGI: 1913865; GeneCards: ATG4B
Available structures
PDB	Ortholog search: PDBe RCSB
PDB	List of PDB id codes 2CY7, 2D1I, 2Z0D, 2Z0E, 2ZZP

Gene location (Human)
Chr.	Chromosome 2 (human)
Band	2q37.3	Start	241,637,213 bp
Band	2q37.3	End	241,673,857 bp
RNA expression pattern
Bgee	Human / Mouse (ortholog); Top expressed in: right hemisphere of cerebellum; anterior pituitary; right lobe of thyroid gland; left testis; left lobe of thyroid gland; body of uterus; canal of the cervix; right ovary; left ovary; mucosa of transverse colon / n/a; More reference expression data
BioGPS	n/a
Gene ontology
Molecular function	peptidase activity; cysteine-type peptidase activity; endopeptidase activity; protein binding; hydrolase activity; cysteine-type endopeptidase activity
Cellular component	cytoplasm; cytosol
Biological process	autophagy; protein transport; autophagy of nucleus; C-terminal protein lipidation; positive regulation of protein catabolic process; autophagy of mitochondrion; autophagosome assembly; macroautophagy; proteolysis; protein targeting to membrane; protein delipidation
Sources:Amigo / QuickGO
Orthologs
Databases	NCBI: entry; OMA: entry
Species	Human	Mouse
Entrez	23192	66615
Ensembl	ENSG00000168397	n/a
UniProt	Q9Y4P1	Q8BGE6
RefSeq (mRNA)	NM_013325; NM_178326	NM_174874; NM_001368266
RefSeq (protein)	NP_037457; NP_847896	NP_777363; NP_001355195
Location (UCSC)	Chr 2: 241.64 – 241.67 Mb	n/a
PubMed search
- Wikidata
View/Edit Human	View/Edit Mouse

Cysteine protease ATG4B is an enzyme that in humans is encoded by the ATG4B gene.

== Function ==
Autophagy is the process by which endogenous proteins and damaged organelles are destroyed intracellularly. Autophagy is postulated to be essential for cell homeostasis and cell remodeling during differentiation, metamorphosis, non-apoptotic cell death, and aging. Reduced levels of autophagy have been described in some malignant tumors, and a role for autophagy in controlling the unregulated cell growth linked to cancer has been proposed. This gene encodes a member of the autophagin protein family. The encoded protein is also designated as a member of the C-54 family of cysteine proteases. Alternate transcriptional splice variants, encoding different isoforms, have been characterized. One main function of Atg4 is to cleave the pre-protein of Atg8, leading to the non-lipidated soluble (-I) form which can be processed further by Atg3, Atg7, Atg5-12 into the lipidated form (-II) anchored to the autophagic membrane.

== Interactions ==
ATG4B has been shown to interact with GABARAPL2.
