= SYNGAP1-related intellectual disability =

Medical condition

SYNGAP1-related intellectual disability is a monogenetic developmental and epileptic encephalopathy that affects the central nervous system. Symptoms include intellectual disability, epilepsy, autism, sensory processing deficits, hypotonia and unstable gait.

== Signs and symptoms ==
The first signs of SYNGAP1-related encephalopathy are typically gross motor delays in infancy followed by developmental delays, seizure onset and language impairment. Penetrance is 100%. Mild to severe intellectual or developmental disability is present in the majority of patients. Epilepsy is present in the majority of cases, with approximately 80-98% of patients affected by seizures. Truncal hypotonia and clumsy or ataxic gait are typical. Behavioral and sleep problems are also common. Approximately 50% of patients receive a diagnosis of autism spectrum disorder. Some patients have significant feeding issues. Constipation has also been reported. Some patients experience strabismus.

== Cause ==
SYNGAP1 encephalopathy is an autosomal dominant genetic disorder caused by haploinsufficiency of the SynGAP protein, usually due to the presence of a heterozygous protein-truncating loss-of-function variation on the SYNGAP1 gene. Missense variations, which may result in either a loss or a change-of-function can also result in the disorder. These pathogenic variations disrupt early cognitive development, particularly in the hippocampus and cortex.

The majority of mutations are considered de novo, however cases of inheritance from both somatic mosaic and germ-line mosaic parents have been reported.

== Diagnosis ==
Diagnosis is based on genetic testing, with the recommended testing approach being chromosomal microarray analysis followed by an intellectual disability multigene panel or whole exome sequencing. A diagnosis is established following the identification of a heterozygous pathogenic (or likely pathogenic) point mutation of the SYNGAP1 gene (present in approximately 89% of patients), a micro deletion of chromosome 6 incorporating SYNGAP1 (approximately 11% of patients), or a balanced translocation disrupting SYNGAP1.

Electroencephalography (EEG) monitoring frequently shows generalized epilepsy, predominantly in the occipital regions. Seizure onset usually occurs around 2 years of age. MRI is usually normal.

=== Seizure types ===
SYNGAP1-related encephalopathy can result in a specific seizure type, characterized by eyelid myoclonia followed by an atonic drop. Reflex seizures are also seen, often triggered by eating and photosensitivity.

- Atonic seizures
- Eyelid myoclonia
- Myoclonic absences
- Myoclonic jerks
- Tonic-clonic seizures

=== Differential diagnosis ===
- Angelman syndrome
- Autism-spectrum disorder
- Cerebral palsy
- Doose syndrome
- Global developmental delay
- Infantile spasms
- Jeavons syndrome
- Lennox–Gastaut syndrome
- Pervasive developmental disorder
- Rett syndrome
- Tuberous sclerosis
- West syndrome

== Treatment ==
There is currently no cure or definitive treatment. Epilepsy may be controlled by the use of one or more anti-epileptic drugs, vagus nerve stimulation, or the ketogenic diet in some cases. Approximately half of patients have seizures that are pharmacoresistant. Patients with significant feeding issues may require the use of a gastrostomy tube. Communication may be supported with the use of an augmentative and alternative communication device. Patients with significant mobility or gait issues may require the use of wheelchairs, adaptive strollers or ankle-foot orthoses.

Supportive treatments can include:

- Applied behavior analysis
- Feeding therapy
- Occupational therapy
- Physical therapy
- Speech and language therapy
- Equine-assisted therapy
- Aquatic therapy
- Music therapy

== Prognosis ==
Despite the common mechanism of haploinsufficiency, there is distinct phenotypic variability amongst patients. Although one third of patients are non-verbal, others can communicate with single words, while others can speak conversationally using four to five word sentences.

== Epidemiology ==
SYNGAP1 encephalopathy is estimated to comprise approximately 0.7–2% of all cases of intellectual disability with over one million people expected to be affected worldwide. The SynGAP Research Fund, a US patient advocacy group, reviewed all the studies that support these estimates. SRF pointed to a more recent study by Lopez-Riviera et al. that predicts an incidence per 100,000 births of 6.107.

== History ==
Although the SynGAP protein was first identified in 1998, SYNGAP1 mutations were not found to be responsible for cases of intellectual disability until 2009.

On October 1, 2021, the first ICD-10 Code for SYNGAP1-related disorders became effective.

- F78.A1 is a billable/specific ICD-10-CM code that can be used to indicate a diagnosis for reimbursement purposes.
- The 2023 edition of ICD-10-CM F78.A1 became effective on October 1, 2022.
- This is the American ICD-10-CM version of F78.A1 - other international versions of ICD-10 F78.A1 may differ.

On August 11, 2021, SYNGAP1-related Disorders was included in the Social Security Administration list of diseases for Compassionate Use.

== Research and potential therapies ==
The use of antisense oligonucleotides to up-regulate the expression of SynGAP protein is currently being researched. The use of statins to address the downstream impacts of loss of SynGAP function on the Ras signaling pathway is also being studied.

Three patient registry efforts are run by third parties and currently gathering patient data:

1. The Citizen SYNGAP1 Registry, established in collaboration with the SynGAP Research Fund
2. The Simons Searchlight Study supported by the Simons Foundation
3. The SYNGAP1 Registry supported by the National Organization of Rare Disorders

There are multiple academic labs publicly working on potential therapies for SYNGAP1:

- The Huganir Lab at Johns Hopkins has secured multiple grants for an ASO, they also have a recently published patent.
  - Syngap Research Fund Grant #2019.3 - Animal Models & ASO Development
  - SFARI Grant # 731581 - Development of antisense oligonucleotides for SYNGAP1 haploinsufficiency associated with autism spectrum disorder and intellectual disability.
- The Prosser Lab is working with the Heller Lab at the University of Pennsylvania to develop an ASO under a program focused on developing new therapies for Epilepsy and Neuro-Developmental Disorders (ENDD).
- The MIND Institute at UC Davis recently received a $1.25M grant from Ron Mittelstaedt to develop therapies for SYNGAP1.

A number of companies have also demonstrated interest in SYNGAP1. Stoke Therapeutics has a published patent for SYNGAP1, Praxis Precision Medicines and Q-State Biosciences have listed SYNGAP1 on their treatment pipelines.
