= Microautophagy =

Autophagic pathway mediated by direct engulfment of the cytoplasmic cargo

Microautophagy is one of the three common forms of autophagic pathway, but unlike macroautophagy and chaperone-mediated autophagy, it is mediated—in mammals by lysosomal action or in plants and fungi by vacuolar action—by direct engulfment of the cytoplasmic cargo. Cytoplasmic material is trapped in the lysosome/vacuole by a random process of membrane invagination.

The microautophagic pathway is especially important for survival of cells under conditions of starvation, nitrogen deprivation, or after treatment with rapamycin. Generally a non-selective process, there are three special cases of a selective microautophagic pathway: micropexophagy, piecemeal microautophagy of the nucleus, and micromitophagy, all which are activated only under a specific conditions.

== Functions of microautophagy ==
Microautophagy together with macroautophagy is necessary for nutrient recycling under starvation. Microautophagy due to degradation of lipids incorporated into vesicles regulates the composition of lysosomal/vacuolar membrane. Microautophagic pathway functions also as one of the mechanism of glycogen delivery into the lysosomes. This autophagic pathway engulfs multivesicular bodies formed after endocytosis therefore it plays role in membrane proteins turnover. Microautophagy is also connected with organellar size maintenance, composition of biological membranes, cell survival under nitrogen restriction, and the transition pathway from starvation-induced growth arrest to logarithmic growth.

== Non-selective microautophagy ==
Non-selective microautophagic process can be dissected into 5 distinct steps. The majority of experiments were done in yeast (vacuolar invaginations) but the molecular principles seem to be more general.

=== Membrane invagination and autophagic tubes formation ===
Invagination is a constitutive process but its frequency is dramatically increased during periods of starvation. Invagination is a tubular process by which is formed the autophagic tube.

Formation of the autophagic tubes is mediated through Atg7-dependent ubiquitin-like conjugation (Ublc) or via vacuolar transporter chaperone (VTC) molecular complex which acts through calmodulin-dependent manner. Calmodulin involvement in tube formation is calcium independent process.

=== Vesicle formation ===
The mechanism of vesicle formation is based on lateral sorting mechanism. Changed composition of membrane molecules (lipid enrichment in the autophagic tubes due to removal of transmembrane proteins) leads spontaneous vesicle formation via phase separation mechanism.

The process of microautophagic vesicle formation is similar to multivesicular bodies formation process

=== Vesicle expansion and scission ===
Enlargement of vesicle is mediated by binding enzymes inside of unclosed vesicle. Basically, this process is reversal to endocytosis. Process follows by pich of the vesicle into the lysosomal/vacuolar lumen. This process is independent on SNARE proteins.

=== Vesicle degradation and recycling ===
Vesicle moves freely in the lumen and during the time is degraded by hydrolases (ec. Atg15p). Nutrients are then released by Atg22p.

== Selective microautophagy ==
Process of non-selective microautophagy can be observed in all types of eukaryotic cells. On the other hand, selective microautophagy is commonly observed in yeast cells. Three types of selective microautophagy can be distinguished: micropexophagy, piecemeal microautophagy of the nucleus and micromitophagy
