= FAM135A =

Protein-coding gene in the species Homo sapiens

Identifiers
- Aliases: FAM135A, KIAA1411, family with sequence similarity 135 member A
- External IDs: MGI: 1915437; HomoloGene: 32665; GeneCards: FAM135A; OMA:FAM135A - orthologs

Gene location (Human)
Chr.	Chromosome 6 (human)
Band	6q13	Start	70,412,941 bp
Band	6q13	End	70,561,174 bp

Gene location (Mouse)
Chr.	Chromosome 1 (mouse)
Band	1|1 A5	Start	24,011,093 bp
Band	1|1 A5	End	24,100,341 bp
RNA expression pattern
Bgee	Human / Mouse (ortholog); Top expressed in: gingival epithelium; oral cavity; jejunal mucosa; skin of thigh; tibia; mucosa of sigmoid colon; palpebral conjunctiva; germinal epithelium; skin of hip; Achilles tendon / Top expressed in: hand; spermatocyte; hair follicle; spermatid; Paneth cell; trigeminal ganglion; otolith organ; utricle; skin of external ear; seminiferous tubule; More reference expression data
BioGPS	n/a
Orthologs
Species	Human	Mouse
Entrez	57579	68187
Ensembl	ENSG00000082269	ENSMUSG00000026153
UniProt	Q9P2D6	Q6NS59
RefSeq (mRNA)	NM_001105531; NM_001162529; NM_020819; NM_001330995; NM_001330996 NM_001330997; NM_001330998; NM_001330999; NM_001331000; NM_001331001; NM_001331002; NM_001331003; NM_001331004; NM_001331005; NM_001331006; NM_001351599; NM_001351600; NM_001351602; NM_001351607; NM_001351608; NM_001351609	NM_026604
RefSeq (protein)	NP_001099001; NP_001156001; NP_001317924; NP_001317925; NP_001317926 NP_001317927; NP_001317928; NP_001317929; NP_001317930; NP_001317931; NP_001317932; NP_001317933; NP_001317934; NP_001317935; NP_065870; NP_001338528; NP_001338529; NP_001338531; NP_001338536; NP_001338537; NP_001338538	NP_080880; NP_001390016; NP_001390017; NP_001390018; NP_001390019 NP_001390020; NP_001390021; NP_001390022; NP_001390023; NP_001390024; NP_001390025; NP_001390026
Location (UCSC)	Chr 6: 70.41 – 70.56 Mb	Chr 1: 24.01 – 24.1 Mb
PubMed search
- Wikidata
View/Edit Human	View/Edit Mouse

KIAA1411, also known as KIAA1411, is a human gene. It has one paralog, FAM135B.
