= ULK1 =

Enzyme found in humans

Identifiers
- Aliases: ULK1, ATG1, ATG1A, UNC51, Unc51.1, hATG1, unc-51 like autophagy activating kinase 1
- External IDs: OMIM: 603168; MGI: 1270126; GeneCards: ULK1
Available structures
PDB	Ortholog search: PDBe RCSB
PDB	List of PDB id codes 4WNO, 4WNP, 5CI7
Enzyme activity
EC #	BRENDA	ExPASy	KEGG	MetaCyc
2.7.11.1	↗	↗	↗	↗

Gene location (Human)
Chr.	Chromosome 12 (human)
Band	12q24.33	Start	131,894,622 bp
Band	12q24.33	End	131,923,150 bp

Gene location (Mouse)
Chr.	Chromosome 5 (mouse)
Band	5|5 F	Start	110,932,354 bp
Band	5|5 F	End	110,957,963 bp
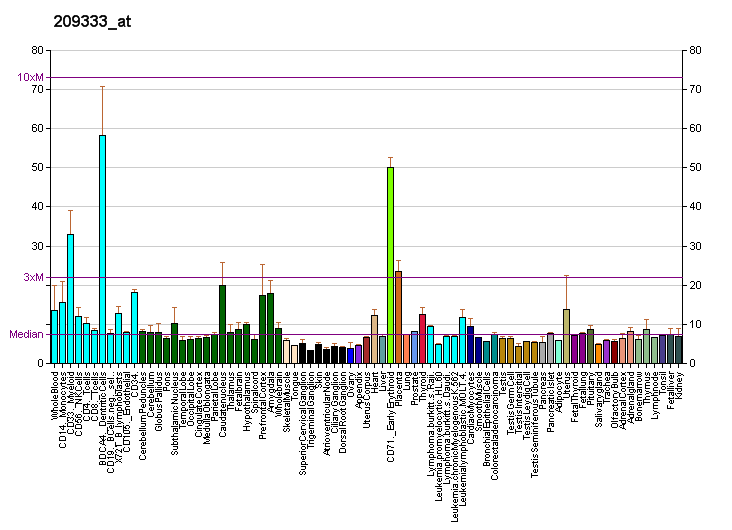
RNA expression pattern
Bgee	Human / Mouse (ortholog); Top expressed in: body of pancreas; left ovary; right hemisphere of cerebellum; gastrocnemius muscle; skin of leg; anterior pituitary; gastric mucosa; right ovary; middle frontal gyrus; nucleus accumbens / Top expressed in: muscle of thigh; genital tubercle; granulocyte; lip; cardiac muscle tissue of left ventricle; cerebellar cortex; tail of embryo; ganglionic eminence; medial head of gastrocnemius muscle; morula; More reference expression data
BioGPS	More reference expression data
Gene ontology
Molecular function	transferase activity; nucleotide binding; protein kinase activity; protein serine/threonine kinase activity; protein binding; ATP binding; kinase activity; GTPase binding; identical protein binding; protein-containing complex binding
Cellular component	cytoplasm; cytosol; phagophore assembly site membrane; extrinsic component of omegasome membrane; Atg1/ULK1 kinase complex; extrinsic component of phagophore assembly site membrane; phagophore assembly site; autophagosome; extrinsic component of autophagosome membrane; endoplasmic reticulum membrane; recycling endosome; guanyl-nucleotide exchange factor complex; mitochondrial outer membrane; axon; membrane
Biological process	neuron projection regeneration; protein localization; axonogenesis; phosphorylation; negative regulation of protein-containing complex assembly; protein phosphorylation; peptidyl-serine phosphorylation; cellular response to nutrient levels; axon extension; response to starvation; protein autophosphorylation; neuron projection development; signal transduction; autophagy; macroautophagy; peptidyl-threonine phosphorylation; regulation of macroautophagy; positive regulation of autophagosome assembly; autophagosome assembly; regulation of autophagy; positive regulation of autophagy
Sources:Amigo / QuickGO
Orthologs
Databases	NCBI: entry; OMA: entry
Species	Human	Mouse
Entrez	8408	22241
Ensembl	ENSG00000177169	ENSMUSG00000029512
UniProt	O75385	O70405
RefSeq (mRNA)	NM_003565	NM_009469; NM_001347394
RefSeq (protein)	NP_003556	NP_001334323; NP_033495
Location (UCSC)	Chr 12: 131.89 – 131.92 Mb	Chr 5: 110.93 – 110.96 Mb
PubMed search
- Wikidata
View/Edit Human	View/Edit Mouse

Serine/threonine-protein kinase ULK1 is an enzyme that in humans is encoded by the ULK1 gene.

Unc-51-like autophagy-activating kinases 1 and 2 (ULK1/2) are two similar isoforms of an enzyme that in humans is encoded by the ULK1/2 genes. The enzyme is specifically a kinase that is involved with autophagy, particularly in response to amino acid withdrawal. Not many studies have been done comparing the two isoforms, but some differences have been recorded.

== Function ==
Ulk1/2 is an important protein in autophagy for mammalian cells, and is homologous to ATG1 in yeast. It is part of the ULK1-complex, which is needed in early steps of autophagosome biogenesis. The ULK1 complex also consists of the FAK family kinase interacting protein of 200 kDa (FIP200 or RB1CC1) and the HORMA (Hop/Rev7/Mad2) domain-containing proteins ATG13 and ATG101. ULK1, specifically, appears to be the most essential for autophagy and is activated under conditions of nutrient deprivation by several upstream signals which is followed by the initiation of autophagy. However, ULK1 and ULK2 show high functional redundancy; studies have shown that ULK2 can compensate for the loss of ULK1. Nutrient dependent autophagy is only fully inhibited if both ULK1 and ULK2 are knocked out.

ULK1 has many downstream phosphorylation targets to aid in this induction of the isolation membrane/ autophagosome. Recently, a mechanism for autophagy has been elucidated. Models have proposed that the active ULK1 directly phosphorylates Beclin-1 at Ser 14 and activates the pro-autophagy class III phosphoinositide 3-kinase (PI(3)K), VPS34 complex, to promote autophagy induction and maturation.

Ulk1/2 is negatively regulated by mTORC1 activity, which is active during anabolic-type environmental cues. In contrast, Ulk1/2 is activated by AMPK activity from starvation signals.

Ulk1/2 may have critical roles beyond what ATG1 performs in yeast, including neural growth and development.

== Interactions ==
When active, mTORC1 inhibits autophagy by phosphorylating both ULK1 and ATG13, which reduces the kinase activity of ULK1. Under starvation conditions, mTORC1 is inhibited and dissociates from ULK1 allowing it to become active. AMPK is activated when intracellular AMP increases under starvation conditions, which inactivate mTORC1, and thus indirectly activate ULK1. AMPK also directly phosphorylates ULK1 at multiple sites in the linker region between the kinase and C-terminal domains.

ULK1 can phosphorylate itself as well as ATG13 and RB1CC1, which are regulatory proteins; however, the direct substrate of ULK1 has not been identified although recent studies suggest it phosphorylates Beclin-1.

Upon proteotoxic stresses, ULK1 has been found to phosphorylate the adaptor protein p62/SQSTM1, which increases the binding affinity of p62/SQSTM1 for ubiquitin.

ULK1 has been shown to interact with Raptor, Beclin1, Class-III-PI3K, GABARAPL2, GABARAP, SYNGAP1 and SDCBP.

ULK1 was shown to interact with CVB3 viral protease 3C.

== Structure ==
ULK1 is a 112-kDa protein. It contains a N-terminal kinase domain, a serine-proline rich region, and a C-terminal interacting domain. The serine-proline rich region has been shown experimentally to be the site of phosphorylation by mTORC1 and AMPK—a negative and positive regulator of ULK1 activity, respectively. The C-terminal domain contains two microtubule-interacting and transport (MIT) domains and acts as a scaffold which links ULK1, ATG13, and FIFP200 together to form a complex that is essential to initiate autophagy. Early autophagy targeting/tethering (EAT) domains in the C-terminus are arranged as MIT domains consisting of two three-helix bundles. MIT domains also mediate interactions with membranes. The N-terminus contains a serine-threonine kinase domain. ULK1 also contains a phosphorylatable activation loop between the N and C lobes of the kinase domain. This region may regulate kinase activity and play a role in recognizing different substrates. ULK1 and ULK2 share significant homology in both the C-terminal and N-terminal domains.

== Post-translational modifications ==
ULK1 is phosphorylated by AMPK on Ser317 and Ser777 to activate autophagy; mTOR participates in inhibitory phosphorylation of ULK1 on Ser757. Additionally, ULK1 can auto-phosphorylate itself at Thr180 to facilitate self activation.

Viral targeting of ULK1 appears to disrupt host autophagy. Coxsackievirus B3 viral proteinase 3C can proteolytically process ULK1 by cleaving after glutamine (Q) residue 524, separating the N-terminal kinase domain from C-terminal early autophagy targeting/tethering (EAT) domain.

== Related diseases ==
Given ULK1's role in autophagy, many diseases such as cancer, neurodegenerative disorders, neurodevelopment disorders, and Crohn's disease could be attributed to any impairments in autophagy regulation.

In cancer specifically, ULK1 has become an attractive therapeutic target. Since autophagy acts as a cell survival trait for cells, it enables tumors (once they are already formed) to survive energy deprivation and other stresses such as chemotherapeutics. For that reason, inhibiting autophagy may prove to be beneficial. Thus, inhibitors have been targeted towards ULK1.
