= Autophagy-related protein 13 =

Protein-coding gene in humans

ATG13

Identifiers
- Aliases: ATG13, KIAA0652, PARATARG8, autophagy related 13
- External IDs: OMIM: 615088; MGI: 1196429; GeneCards: ATG13
Available structures
PDB	Ortholog search: PDBe RCSB
PDB	List of PDB id codes 5C50

Gene location (Human)
Chr.	Chromosome 11 (human)
Band	11p11.2	Start	46,617,527 bp
Band	11p11.2	End	46,674,818 bp

Gene location (Mouse)
Chr.	Chromosome 2 (mouse)
Band	2|2 E1	Start	91,504,963 bp
Band	2|2 E1	End	91,540,921 bp
RNA expression pattern
Bgee	Human / Mouse (ortholog); Top expressed in: left testis; right testis; anterior pituitary; epithelium of colon; prefrontal cortex; right frontal lobe; skin of leg; tibial nerve; right hemisphere of cerebellum; body of pancreas / Top expressed in: neural layer of retina; superior frontal gyrus; muscle of thigh; dentate gyrus of hippocampal formation granule cell; primary visual cortex; lip; blastocyst; cerebellar cortex; epithelium of lens; esophagus; More reference expression data
BioGPS	n/a
Gene ontology
Molecular function	protein binding; protein kinase binding
Cellular component	cytoplasm; cytosol; Atg1/ULK1 kinase complex; mitochondrion; phagophore assembly site; endoplasmic reticulum membrane
Biological process	autophagy; macroautophagy; autophagosome assembly; positive regulation of protein targeting to mitochondrion; mitophagy; response to mitochondrial depolarisation; regulation of macroautophagy
Sources:Amigo / QuickGO
Orthologs
Databases	NCBI: entry; OMA: entry
Species	Human	Mouse
Entrez	9776	51897
Ensembl	ENSG00000175224	ENSMUSG00000027244
UniProt	O75143	Q91YI1
RefSeq (mRNA)	NM_001142673; NM_001205119; NM_001205120; NM_001205121; NM_001205122 NM_001346311; NM_001346312; NM_001346313; NM_001346314; NM_001346315; NM_001346316; NM_001346317; NM_001346318; NM_001346319; NM_001346320; NM_001346321; NM_001346322; NM_001346323; NM_001346324; NM_001346325; NM_001346326; NM_001346327; NM_001346328; NM_001346329; NM_001346330; NM_001346331; NM_001346332; NM_001346333; NM_001346334; NM_001346335; NM_001346336; NM_001346337; NM_001346338; NM_001346340; NM_001346342; NM_001346344; NM_001346346; NM_001346348; NM_001346349; NM_001346350; NM_001346351; NM_001346352; NM_001346353; NM_001346354; NM_001346355; NM_001346356; NM_001346357; NM_001346358; NM_001346359; NM_001346360; NM_014741	NM_145528; NM_001355416; NM_001355417; NM_001355418; NM_001355419 NM_001355420; NM_001355421
RefSeq (protein)	NP_001136145; NP_001192048; NP_001192049; NP_001192050; NP_001192051 NP_001333240; NP_001333241; NP_001333242; NP_001333243; NP_001333244; NP_001333245; NP_001333246; NP_001333247; NP_001333248; NP_001333249; NP_001333250; NP_001333251; NP_001333252; NP_001333253; NP_001333254; NP_001333255; NP_001333256; NP_001333257; NP_001333258; NP_001333259; NP_001333260; NP_001333261; NP_001333262; NP_001333263; NP_001333264; NP_001333265; NP_001333266; NP_001333267; NP_001333269; NP_001333271; NP_001333273; NP_001333275; NP_001333277; NP_001333278; NP_001333279; NP_001333280; NP_001333281; NP_001333282; NP_001333283; NP_001333284; NP_001333285; NP_001333286; NP_001333287; NP_001333288; NP_001333289; NP_055556	NP_663503; NP_001342345; NP_001342346; NP_001342347; NP_001342348 NP_001342349; NP_001342350
Location (UCSC)	Chr 11: 46.62 – 46.67 Mb	Chr 2: 91.5 – 91.54 Mb
PubMed search
- Wikidata
View/Edit Human	View/Edit Mouse

Autophagy-related protein 13 also known as ATG13 is a protein that in humans is encoded by the ATG13 gene (previously called KIAA0652).

ATG13 is an autophagy factor required for phagosome formation. ATG13 is a target of the TOR kinase signaling pathway that regulates autophagy through phosphorylation of ATG13 and ULK1, and the regulation of the ATG13-ULK1-RB1CC1 complex.
