= SYNGAP1 =

Protein in Homo sapiens

Identifiers
- Aliases: SYNGAP1, MRD5, RASA1, RASA5, SYNGAP, synaptic Ras GTPase activating protein 1
- External IDs: OMIM: 603384; MGI: 3039785; GeneCards: SYNGAP1

Gene location (Human)
Chr.	Chromosome 6 (human)
Band	6p21.32	Start	33,419,661 bp
Band	6p21.32	End	33,453,689 bp

Gene location (Mouse)
Chr.	Chromosome 17 (mouse)
Band	17|17 A3.3	Start	26,941,253 bp
Band	17|17 A3.3	End	26,972,434 bp
RNA expression pattern
Bgee	Human / Mouse (ortholog); Top expressed in: pituitary gland; right uterine tube; anterior pituitary; right ovary; right hemisphere of cerebellum; body of uterus; left ovary; superior frontal gyrus; canal of the cervix; myometrium / Top expressed in: primary visual cortex; dentate gyrus of hippocampal formation granule cell; superior frontal gyrus; neural layer of retina; genital tubercle; tail of embryo; ventricular zone; zygote; ascending aorta; aortic valve; More reference expression data
BioGPS	n/a
Gene ontology
Molecular function	GTPase activator activity; SH3 domain binding
Cellular component	cytoplasm; cytosol; membrane; intrinsic component of the cytoplasmic side of the plasma membrane; dendritic shaft; postsynaptic density; plasma membrane; glutamatergic synapse
Biological process	pattern specification process; visual learning; negative regulation of neuron apoptotic process; regulation of long-term neuronal synaptic plasticity; regulation of MAPK cascade; regulation of GTPase activity; dendrite development; receptor clustering; MAPK cascade; regulation of synaptic plasticity; positive regulation of GTPase activity; negative regulation of axonogenesis; regulation of synapse structure or activity; signal transduction; Ras protein signal transduction; negative regulation of Ras protein signal transduction; maintenance of postsynaptic specialization structure
Sources:Amigo / QuickGO
Orthologs
Databases	NCBI: entry; OMA: entry
Species	Human	Mouse
Entrez	8831	240057
Ensembl	ENSG00000227460; ENSG00000197283	ENSMUSG00000067629
UniProt	Q96PV0	F6SEU4
RefSeq (mRNA)	NM_006772; NM_001130066	NM_001281491
RefSeq (protein)	NP_001123538; NP_006763	NP_001268420; NP_001357962; NP_001357963; NP_001380956
Location (UCSC)	Chr 6: 33.42 – 33.45 Mb	Chr 17: 26.94 – 26.97 Mb
PubMed search
- Wikidata
View/Edit Human	View/Edit Mouse

Synaptic Ras GTPase-activating protein 1, also known as synaptic Ras-GAP 1 or SYNGAP1, is a protein that in humans is encoded by the SYNGAP1 gene. SYNGAP1 is a ras GTPase-activating protein that is critical for the development of cognition and proper synapse function. Mutations in humans can cause intellectual disability, epilepsy, autism and sensory processing deficits.

== Function ==
SynGAP1 is a complex protein with several functions that may be regulated temporally via complex isoforms. A well-documented function of SynGAP1 involves NMDA receptor-mediated synaptic plasticity and membrane insertion of AMPA receptors through the suppression of upstream signaling pathways. However, SynGAP1 has also been shown to function cooperatively with Unc51.1 in axon formation. One way SynGAP1 affects these processes is through the MAP kinase signaling pathway by attenuation of Ras signalling. However, alternative splicing and multiple translational start sites have been shown to cause opposing effects, illustrating the importance of multiple functional domains that reside within the c- and n-termini. For example, the expression of an α1 or α2 c-terminal variant of SynGAP1 will either increase or decrease synaptic strength, respectively. Overall, SynGAP1 is essential for development and survival, which is evident as knockout mice die perinatally.

=== Dendritic spine development and maturation ===
SynGAP1 is shown to localize at the postsynaptic density on the dendritic spines of excitatory synapses. Cultured neurons of SynGAP heterozygotic and homozygotic knockout mice display accelerated maturation of dendritic spines, including an increase in overall spine size, which produces more mushroom shaped and less stubby spines. Spine heads are enlarged due to the increased phosphorylation of cofilin, leading to a decrease in F-actin severing and turnover. The increased size of the dendritic spines also corresponded to an increase in membrane bound AMPARs or a decrease in silent synapses. These neurons displayed a higher frequency and larger amplitudes of miniature excitatory postsynaptic potentials (mEPSP). Mice models with domain specific mutations led to neonatal hyperactivity of the hippocampal trisynaptic circuit. Mutations had the greatest impact during the first 3 weeks of development, and reversal of mutations in adults did not improve behavior and cognition.

== Clinical significance ==
=== Syngap1-related intellectual disability ===
Several mutations in the SYNGAP1 gene were identified as the cause of intellectual disability. Intellectual disability is sometimes associated with syndromes of other defects caused by the same gene, but SYNGAP1-associated intellectual disability is not; it is therefore called non-syndromic intellectual disability. Since neither of the parents of children with this condition have the mutation, this means it was a sporadic mutation that occurred during division of the parents' gametes (meiosis) or fertilization of the egg. It is a dominant mutation, which means that the individual will be developmentally disabled even if only one allele is mutated.

Mutations in this gene have also been found associated to cases of developmental and epileptic encephalopathies, autism spectrum disorder, and touch-related sensory processing deficits.

Epilepsy in this disorder is distinctive, combining eyelid myoclonia with absences and myoclonic-atonic seizures. Seizures are often triggered by eating.

==== Treatment with statins ====
A causal therapy was the first successful worldwide by the group of Prof. Gerhard Kluger tested at the Schön Klinik in Vogtareuth with statins. In the process, the RAS pathway, which is overactive in SYNGAP1-associated intellectual disability is inhibited by statins. Further clinical studies by the group of Prof. Gerhard Kluger are in preparation.

=== Excitotoxicity ===
In an animal model of stroke, tau-deficient mice were found to have increased levels of SYNGAP1, which inhibited Ras/ERK signalling, resulting in reduced excitotoxic brain damage. It was found that in the absence of tau, SYNGAP1 more readily binds to PSD-95, which suppresses NMDA receptor meditated activation of Ras at the post-synapse.

== Interactions ==
SYNGAP1 has been shown to interact with DLG3 and ULK1.
