= UVRAG =

Protein-coding gene in the species Homo sapiens

Identifiers
- Aliases: UVRAG, DHTX, VPS38, p63, UV radiation resistance associated
- External IDs: OMIM: 602493; MGI: 1925860; GeneCards: UVRAG

Gene location (Human)
Chr.	Chromosome 11 (human)
Band	11q13.5	Start	75,815,210 bp
Band	11q13.5	End	76,144,232 bp

Gene location (Mouse)
Chr.	Chromosome 7 (mouse)
Band	7|7 E1	Start	98,534,228 bp
Band	7|7 E1	End	98,790,348 bp
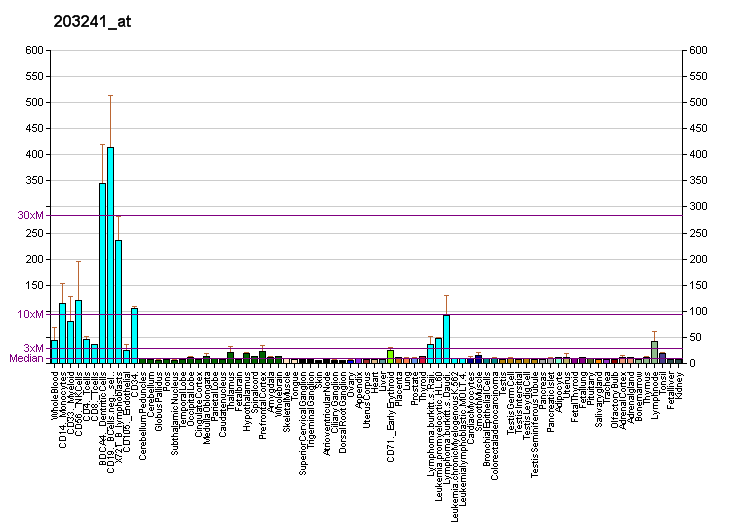
RNA expression pattern
Bgee	Human / Mouse (ortholog); Top expressed in: corpus callosum; Achilles tendon; subcutaneous adipose tissue; epithelium of colon; abdominal fat; monocyte; parietal pleura; lymph node; tonsil; testicle / Top expressed in: gastrula; primary oocyte; zygote; calvaria; spleen; stroma of bone marrow; secondary oocyte; decidua; thymus; endothelial cell of lymphatic vessel; More reference expression data
BioGPS	More reference expression data
Gene ontology
Molecular function	SH3 domain binding; protein binding; SNARE binding
Cellular component	cytoplasm; HOPS complex; endosome; late endosome; centrosome; chromosome; midbody; early endosome; phagocytic vesicle; endoplasmic reticulum; DNA-dependent protein kinase complex; lysosome; chromosome, centromeric region; protein-containing complex; autophagosome membrane; autophagosome; cytoplasmic vesicle
Biological process	double-strand break repair via classical nonhomologous end joining; regulation of cytokinesis; regulation of protein serine/threonine kinase activity; retrograde vesicle-mediated transport, Golgi to endoplasmic reticulum; multivesicular body sorting pathway; chromosome segregation; regulation of vesicle-mediated transport; receptor catabolic process; cellular response to DNA damage stimulus; autophagy; spindle organization; viral entry into host cell; maintenance of Golgi location; DNA repair; SNARE complex assembly; positive regulation of autophagosome maturation; centrosome cycle; autophagosome maturation
Sources:Amigo / QuickGO
Orthologs
Databases	NCBI: entry; OMA: entry
Species	Human	Mouse
Entrez	7405	78610
Ensembl	ENSG00000198382	ENSMUSG00000035354
UniProt	Q9P2Y5	Q8K245
RefSeq (mRNA)	NM_003369	NM_178635
RefSeq (protein)	NP_003360	NP_848750
Location (UCSC)	Chr 11: 75.82 – 76.14 Mb	Chr 7: 98.53 – 98.79 Mb
PubMed search
- Wikidata
View/Edit Human	View/Edit Mouse

UV radiation resistance-associated gene protein is a protein that in humans is encoded by the UVRAG gene.

This gene complements the ultraviolet sensitivity of xeroderma pigmentosum group C cells and encodes a protein with a C2 domain. The protein activates the Beclin1-PI(3)KC3 complex, promoting autophagy and suppressing the proliferation and tumorigenicity of human colon cancer cells.

Chromosomal aberrations involving this gene are associated with left-right axis malformation and mutations in this gene have been associated with colon cancer.
