= Chondroprotection =

Chemical Compound

A chondroprotective compound is a specific compound or chemical that delays progressive joint space narrowing characteristic of arthritis and improves the biomechanics of articular joints by protecting chondrocytes. These agents perform various functions, such as:

1. Stimulating chondrocyte synthesis of collagen and proteoglycans
2. Enhancing synoviocyte production of hyaluronan
3. Inhibiting cartilage degradation
4. Preventing fibrin formation in the vasculature

Chondroprotective agents can include both endogenous and synthetic chemicals. Endogenous molecules include hyaluronic acid, glucosamine, and chondroitin sulfate.
