= BECN1 =

Protein-coding gene in the species Homo sapiens

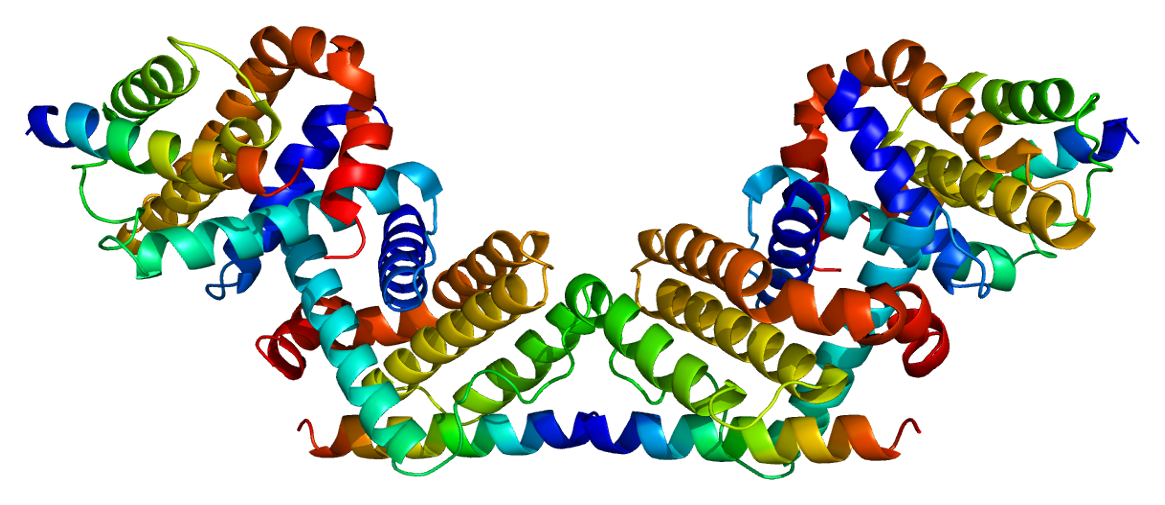

Identifiers
- Aliases: BECN1, ATG6, VPS30, beclin1, beclin 1
- External IDs: OMIM: 604378; MGI: 1891828; GeneCards: BECN1
Available structures
PDB	Ortholog search: K7ER46 PDBe K7ER46 RCSB
PDB	List of PDB id codes 2P1L, 2PON, 3DVU, 4DDP, 4MI8

Gene location (Human)
Chr.	Chromosome 17 (human)
Band	17q21.31	Start	42,810,134 bp
Band	17q21.31	End	42,833,350 bp

Gene location (Mouse)
Chr.	Chromosome 11 (mouse)
Band	11|11 D	Start	101,176,778 bp
Band	11|11 D	End	101,193,112 bp
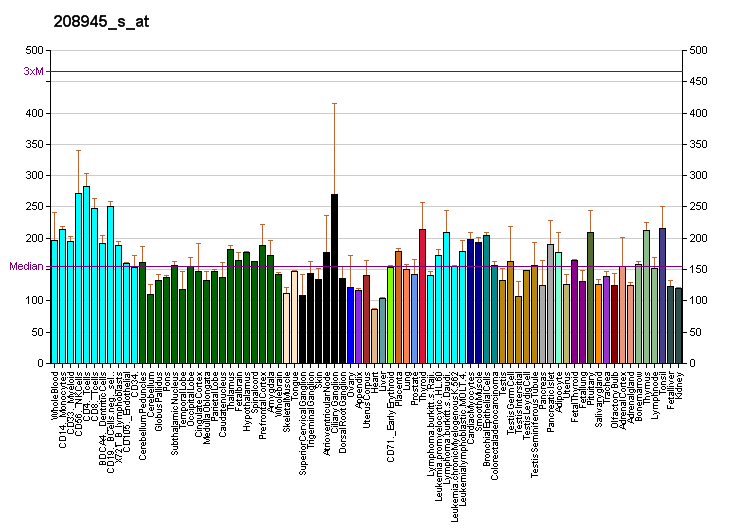

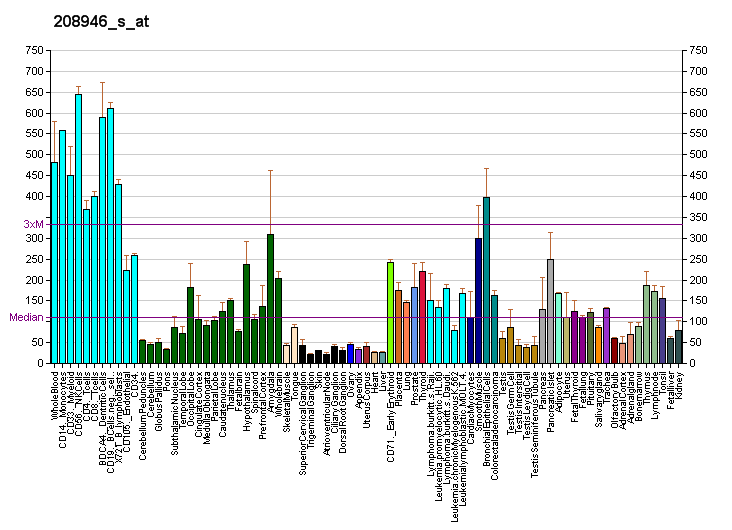
RNA expression pattern
Bgee	Human / Mouse (ortholog); Top expressed in: rectum; epithelium of colon; monocyte; Achilles tendon; gastric mucosa; Skeletal muscle tissue of rectus abdominis; gastrocnemius muscle; olfactory zone of nasal mucosa; muscle layer of sigmoid colon; stromal cell of endometrium / Top expressed in: medullary collecting duct; Paneth cell; blood; endothelial cell of lymphatic vessel; retinal pigment epithelium; endocardial cushion; aortic valve; ascending aorta; hair follicle; ciliary body; More reference expression data
BioGPS	More reference expression data
Gene ontology
Molecular function	phosphatidylinositol 3-kinase binding; protein binding; GTPase binding; ubiquitin protein ligase binding; protein kinase binding; protein homodimerization activity
Cellular component	endosome membrane; cytoplasm; mitochondrial membranes; trans-Golgi network; Golgi apparatus; cytosol; nucleus; autophagosome; phagophore assembly site; membrane; dendrite; endoplasmic reticulum; phosphatidylinositol 3-kinase complex, class III; endoplasmic reticulum membrane; phosphatidylinositol 3-kinase complex, class III, type II; cytoplasmic vesicle; endosome; extrinsic component of membrane; phosphatidylinositol 3-kinase complex, class III, type I; phagocytic vesicle; mitochondrion; protein-containing complex
Biological process	negative regulation of cell population proliferation; response to hypoxia; cellular response to aluminum ion; response to vitamin E; lysosome organization; cell cycle; positive regulation of phosphatidylinositol 3-kinase signaling; cellular response to glucose starvation; cellular defense response; cytokinesis; cellular response to epidermal growth factor stimulus; cell division; receptor catabolic process; autophagy of nucleus; cellular response to nitrogen starvation; viral process; late endosome to vacuole transport; apoptotic process; cytoplasm to vacuole transport by the Cvt pathway; endocytosis; engulfment of apoptotic cell; positive regulation of attachment of mitotic spindle microtubules to kinetochore; amyloid-beta metabolic process; neuron development; defense response to virus; response to other organism; mitotic metaphase plate congression; regulation of catalytic activity; negative regulation of reactive oxygen species metabolic process; regulation of cytokinesis; negative regulation of apoptotic process; negative regulation of cell death; autophagosome assembly; macroautophagy; ageing; response to iron(II) ion; response to lead ion; protein deubiquitination; response to nutrient levels; cellular response to amino acid starvation; cellular response to hydrogen peroxide; cellular response to copper ion; negative regulation of lysosome organization; positive regulation of autophagosome assembly; autophagy of mitochondrion; mitophagy; autophagy; positive regulation of autophagy; response to mitochondrial depolarisation; early endosome to late endosome transport; negative regulation of autophagy; positive regulation of cardiac muscle hypertrophy; negative regulation of autophagosome assembly; positive regulation of intrinsic apoptotic signaling pathway
Sources:Amigo / QuickGO
Orthologs
Databases	NCBI: entry; OMA: entry
Species	Human	Mouse
Entrez	8678	56208
Ensembl	ENSG00000126581	ENSMUSG00000035086
UniProt	Q14457	O88597
RefSeq (mRNA)	NM_001313998; NM_001313999; NM_001314000; NM_003766	NM_019584; NM_001359819; NM_001359820; NM_001359821
RefSeq (protein)	NP_001300927; NP_001300928; NP_001300929; NP_003757	NP_062530; NP_001346748; NP_001346749; NP_001346750
Location (UCSC)	Chr 17: 42.81 – 42.83 Mb	Chr 11: 101.18 – 101.19 Mb
PubMed search
- Wikidata
View/Edit Human	View/Edit Mouse

Beclin-1 is a protein that in humans is encoded by the BECN1 gene. Beclin-1 is a mammalian ortholog of the yeast autophagy-related gene 6 (Atg6) and BEC-1 in the C. elegans nematode. This protein interacts with either BCL-2 or PI3k class III, playing a critical role in the regulation of both autophagy and cell death.

== Role in disease ==
Beclin-1 plays an important role in tumorigenesis, and neurodegeneration, being implicated in the autophagic programmed cell death. Ovarian cancer with upregulated autophagy has a less aggressive behavior and is more responsive to chemotherapy.

Schizophrenia is associated with low levels of Beclin-1 in the hippocampus of those affected, which causes diminished autophagy which in turn results in increased neuronal cell death.

== Interactions ==
BECN1 has been shown to interact with:

- Bcl-2
- BCL2L2
- GOPC
- MAP1LC3A
- Rubicon
- UVRAG

== Modulators ==
=== Trehalose ===
Trehalose reduces p62/Beclin-1 ratio and increases autophagy in the frontal cortex of ICR mice, possibly by increasing Beclin-1.
