= ULK2 =

Identifiers
- Aliases: ULK2, ATG1B, Unc51.2, unc-51 like autophagy activating kinase 2
- External IDs: OMIM: 608650; MGI: 1352758; GeneCards: ULK2
Enzyme activity
EC #	BRENDA	ExPASy	KEGG	MetaCyc
2.7.11.1	↗	↗	↗	↗

Gene location (Human)
Chr.	Chromosome 17 (human)
Band	17p11.2	Start	19,770,829 bp
Band	17p11.2	End	19,867,936 bp

Gene location (Mouse)
Chr.	Chromosome 11 (mouse)
Band	11|11 B2	Start	61,666,475 bp
Band	11|11 B2	End	61,745,899 bp
RNA expression pattern
Bgee	Human / Mouse (ortholog); Top expressed in: ganglionic eminence; ventricular zone; corpus callosum; C1 segment; sperm; right testis; prefrontal cortex; secondary oocyte; left testis; orbitofrontal cortex / Top expressed in: triceps brachii muscle; temporal muscle; sternocleidomastoid muscle; muscle of thigh; digastric muscle; quadriceps femoris muscle; stroma of bone marrow; spermatid; gastrocnemius muscle; ganglionic eminence; More reference expression data
BioGPS	n/a
Gene ontology
Molecular function	transferase activity; nucleotide binding; protein kinase activity; kinase activity; protein serine/threonine kinase activity; protein binding; ATP binding
Cellular component	phagophore assembly site membrane; membrane; cytoplasmic vesicle membrane; cytoplasmic vesicle; phagophore assembly site; cytosol
Biological process	axonogenesis; phosphorylation; nervous system development; protein phosphorylation; negative regulation of collateral sprouting; axon extension; response to starvation; protein autophosphorylation; signal transduction; autophagy; autophagosome assembly; regulation of autophagy
Sources:Amigo / QuickGO
Orthologs
Databases	NCBI: entry; OMA: entry
Species	Human	Mouse
Entrez	9706	29869
Ensembl	ENSG00000083290	ENSMUSG00000004798
UniProt	Q8IYT8	Q9QY01
RefSeq (mRNA)	NM_001142610; NM_014683	NM_013881
RefSeq (protein)	NP_001136082; NP_055498	NP_038909
Location (UCSC)	Chr 17: 19.77 – 19.87 Mb	Chr 11: 61.67 – 61.75 Mb
PubMed search
- Wikidata
View/Edit Human	View/Edit Mouse

Serine/threonine-protein kinase ULK2 is an enzyme which in humans is encoded by the ULK2 gene. The gene is located within the Smith–Magenis syndrome region on chromosome 17.

== Structure and function ==
This gene encodes a protein that is similar to a serine/threonine kinase in C. elegans which is involved in axonal elongation. The structure of this protein is similar to the C. elegans protein in that both proteins have an N-terminal kinase domain, a central proline/serine rich (PS) domain, and a C-terminal (C) domain. ULK2 and the GTPase activating protein SynGAP function cooperatively in axon formation.
