= FAM135B =

Protein-coding gene in the species Homo sapiens

Identifiers
- Aliases: FAM135B, C8ORFK32, family with sequence similarity 135 member B
- External IDs: MGI: 1917613; GeneCards: FAM135B

Gene location (Human)
Chr.	Chromosome 8 (human)
Band	8q24.23	Start	138,130,023 bp
Band	8q24.23	End	138,497,261 bp

Gene location (Mouse)
Chr.	Chromosome 15 (mouse)
Band	15|15 D3	Start	71,303,458 bp
Band	15|15 D3	End	71,599,687 bp
RNA expression pattern
Bgee	Human / Mouse (ortholog); Top expressed in: left testis; sperm; right testis; testicle; cerebellar hemisphere; right hemisphere of cerebellum; gonad; sural nerve; pancreatic ductal cell; islet of Langerhans / Top expressed in: spermatid; seminiferous tubule; spermatocyte; dentate gyrus of hippocampal formation granule cell; primary visual cortex; superior frontal gyrus; neural layer of retina; cerebellar cortex; supraoptic nucleus; neural tube; More reference expression data
BioGPS	n/a
Orthologs
Databases	NCBI: entry; OMA: entry
Species	Human	Mouse
Entrez	51059	70363
Ensembl	ENSG00000147724	ENSMUSG00000036800
UniProt	Q49AJ0	Q9DAI6
RefSeq (mRNA)	NM_015912; NM_001362965	NM_177819
RefSeq (protein)	NP_056996; NP_001349894	NP_808487
Location (UCSC)	Chr 8: 138.13 – 138.5 Mb	Chr 15: 71.3 – 71.6 Mb
PubMed search
- Wikidata
View/Edit Human	View/Edit Mouse

FAM135B is a human gene coding for a protein of unknown function. It is well conserved in primates, rodents, zebra fish. It has one paralog, FAM135A.

== Gene ==
FAM135B is located on the long arm of Chromosome 8 in humans on the anti-sense located at 24.23. The following genes are near FAM135B on the chromosome:

- COL22A1: Collagen producing gene that is a cell adhesion ligand for skin epithelial cells and fibroblast
- FLJ45972: Gene function is unknown
- KCNK9: Gene that encodes for a two pore potassium channel

== Expression ==
FAM135B is expressed in the brain, ear, eye, pancreas and testis. Within the brain, expression is apparent within the motor nucleus of trigeminal In addition, it is mainly expressed in normal health states, although it has shown moderate expression in glioma, non-neoplasima as well as expression in germ cell tumors.

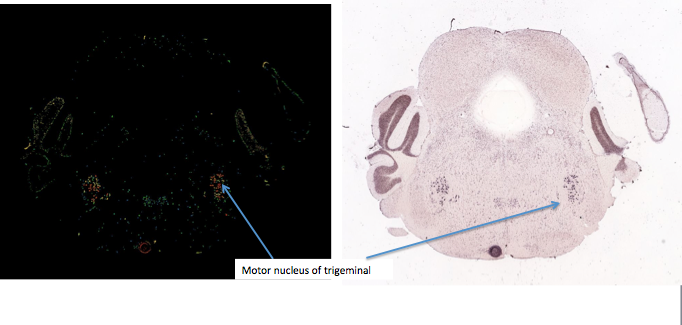

== Interactions ==
FAM135B has shown to interact with KAT5, a gene that encodes for a histone acetyltransferase through yeast two-hybrid experimentation.

== Protein ==
The protein encoded on FAM135 is 1406 amino acids long. The protein contains a region called DUF676, believed to be a putative serine esterase as well as two protein regions called DUF3657.

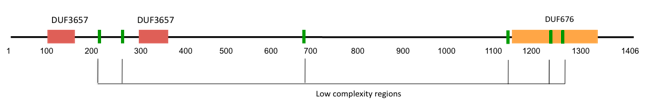
Graphical representation of protein FAM135B

== Clinical significance ==
FAM135B has shown to be expressed in individuals with extrapulmonary tuberculosis.
