= Autophagy =

Process of cells digesting parts of themselves

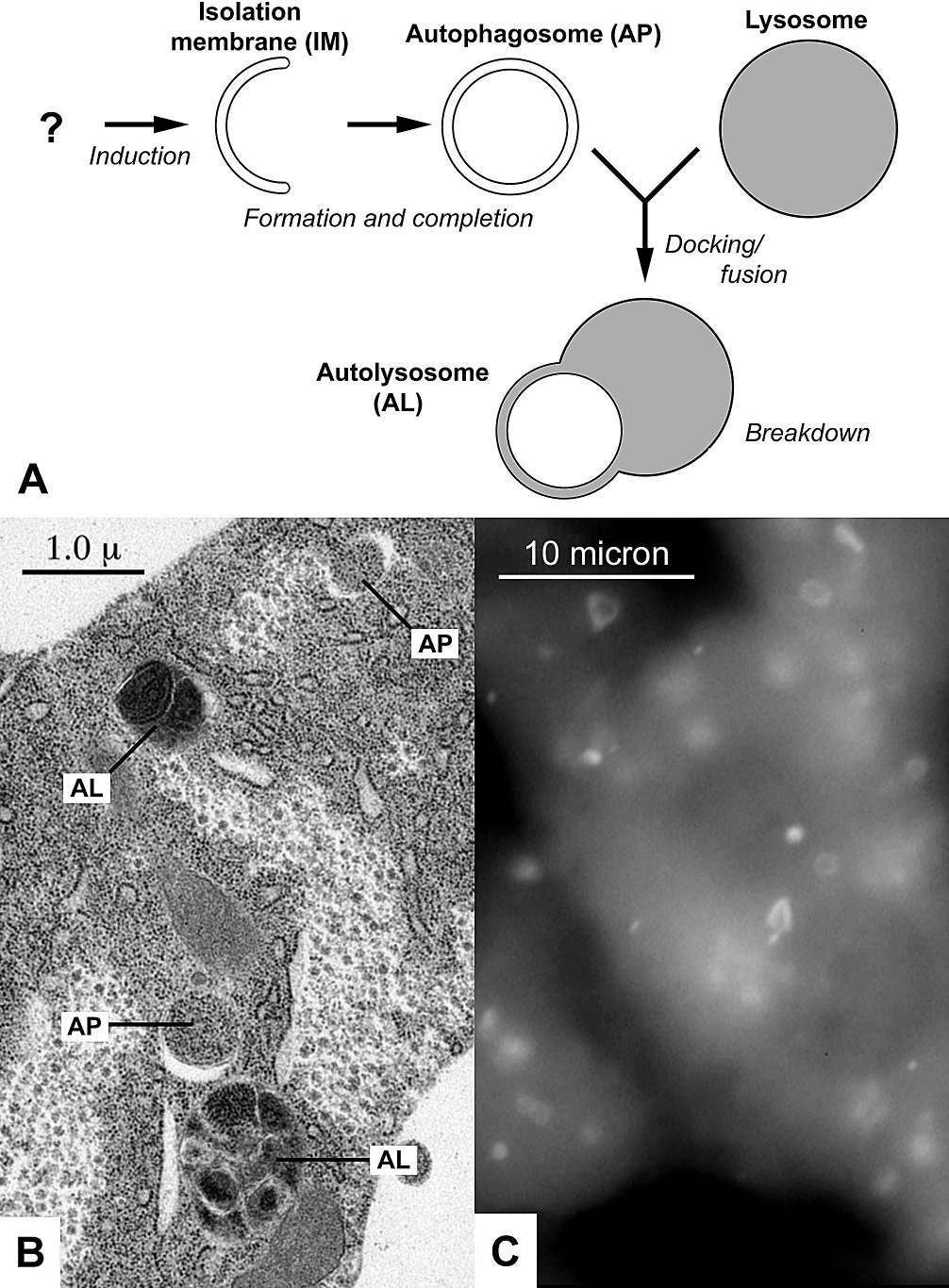
A Diagram of the process of autophagy, which produces the structures autophagosomes (AP), and autolysosomes (AL) B Electron micrograph of autophagic structures AP and AL in the fat body of a fruit fly larva C Fluorescently labeled autophagosomes AP in liver cells of starved mice

Autophagy (or autophagocytosis; from the Greek αὐτόφαγος, autóphagos, meaning "self-devouring" and κύτος, kýtos, meaning "hollow") is the natural, conserved degradation of a biological cell that removes unnecessary or dysfunctional components through a lysosome-dependent regulated mechanism. It allows the orderly degradation and recycling of cellular components. Although initially characterized as a primordial degradation pathway induced to protect against starvation, it has become increasingly clear that autophagy also plays a major role in the homeostasis of non-starved cells. Defects in autophagy have been linked to various human diseases, including neurodegeneration and cancer, and interest in modulating autophagy as a potential treatment for these diseases has grown rapidly.

Four forms of autophagy have been identified: macroautophagy, microautophagy, chaperone-mediated autophagy (CMA), and crinophagy. In macroautophagy (the most thoroughly researched form of autophagy), cytoplasmic components (like mitochondria) are targeted and isolated from the rest of the cell within a double-membrane vesicle known as an autophagosome, which, in time, fuses with an available lysosome, bringing its specialty process of waste management and disposal; and eventually the contents of the vesicle (now called an autolysosome) are degraded and recycled. In crinophagy (the least well-known and researched form of autophagy), unnecessary secretory granules are degraded and recycled.

In disease, autophagy has been seen as an adaptive response to stress, promoting survival of the cell; but in other cases, it appears to promote cell death and morbidity. In the extreme case of starvation, the breakdown of cellular components promotes cellular survival by maintaining cellular energy levels.

The word "autophagy" was in existence and frequently used from the middle of the 19th century. In its present usage, the term autophagy was coined by Belgian biochemist Christian de Duve in 1963 based on his discovery of the functions of lysosome. The identification of autophagy-related genes in yeast in the 1990s allowed researchers to deduce the mechanisms of autophagy, which eventually led to the award of the 2016 Nobel Prize in Physiology or Medicine to Japanese researcher Yoshinori Ohsumi.

== History ==
Autophagy was first observed by Keith R. Porter and his student Thomas Ashford at the Rockefeller Institute. In January 1962 they reported an increased number of lysosomes in rat liver cells after the addition of glucagon, and that some displaced lysosomes towards the centre of the cell contained other cell organelles such as mitochondria. They called this autolysis after Christian de Duve and Alex B. Novikoff. However Porter and Ashford wrongly interpreted their data as lysosome formation (ignoring the pre-existing organelles). Lysosomes could not be cell organelles, but part of cytoplasm such as mitochondria, and that hydrolytic enzymes were produced by microbodies.

In 1963 Hruban, Spargo and colleagues published a detailed ultrastructural description of "focal cytoplasmic degradation", which referenced a 1955 German study of injury-induced sequestration. Hruban, Spargo and colleagues recognized three continuous stages of maturation of the sequestered cytoplasm to lysosomes, and that the process was not limited to injury states that functioned under physiological conditions for "reutilization of cellular materials", and the "disposal of organelles" during differentiation. Inspired by this discovery, de Duve christened the phenomena "autophagy". Unlike Porter and Ashford, de Duve conceived the term as a part of lysosomal function while describing the role of glucagon as a major inducer of cell degradation in the liver. With his student Russell Deter, he established that lysosomes are responsible for glucagon-induced autophagy. This was the first time the fact that lysosomes are the sites of intracellular autophagy was established.

In the 1990s several groups of scientists independently discovered autophagy-related genes using the budding yeast. Notably, Yoshinori Ohsumi and Michael Thumm examined starvation-induced non-selective autophagy; in the meantime, Daniel J. Klionsky discovered the cytoplasm-to-vacuole targeting (CVT) pathway, which is a form of selective autophagy. They soon found that they were in fact looking at essentially the same pathway, just from different angles. Initially, the genes discovered by these and other yeast groups were given different names (APG, AUT, CVT, GSA, PAG, PAZ, and PDD). A unified nomenclature was advocated in 2003 by the yeast researchers to use ATG to denote autophagy genes. The 2016 Nobel Prize in Physiology or Medicine was awarded to Yoshinori Ohsumi, although some have pointed out that if there is only one recipient of the award, it must be Ohsumi, but that the award could have been more inclusive.

The field of autophagy research experienced accelerated growth at the turn of the 21st century. Knowledge of ATG genes provided scientists more convenient tools to dissect functions of autophagy in human health and disease. In 1999, a landmark discovery connecting autophagy with cancer was published by Beth Levine's group. To this date, relationship between cancer and autophagy continues to be a main theme of autophagy research. The roles of autophagy in neurodegeneration and immune defense also received considerable attention. In 2003, the first Gordon Research Conference on autophagy was held at Waterville. In 2005, Daniel J Klionsky launched Autophagy, a scientific journal dedicated to this field. The first Keystone Symposia on autophagy was held in 2007 at Monterey. In 2008, Carol A Mercer created a BHMT fusion protein (GST-BHMT), which showed starvation-induced site-specific fragmentation in cell lines. The degradation of betaine homocysteine methyltransferase (BHMT), a metabolic enzyme, could be used to assess autophagy flux in mammalian cells. Macro, micro, and Chaperone mediated autophagy are mediated by autophagy-related genes and their associated enzymes. Macroautophagy is then divided into bulk and selective autophagy. In the selective autophagy is the autophagy of organelles; mitophagy, lipophagy, pexophagy, chlorophagy, ribophagy and others.

Macroautophagy is the main pathway, used primarily to eradicate damaged cell organelles or unused proteins. First the phagophore engulfs the material that needs to be degraded, which forms a double membrane known as an autophagosome, around the organelle marked for destruction. The autophagosome then travels through the cytoplasm of the cell to a lysosome in mammals, or vacuoles in yeast and plants, and the two organelles fuse. Within the lysosome/vacuole, the contents of the autophagosome are degraded via acidic lysosomal hydrolase.

Microautophagy, on the other hand, involves the direct engulfment of cytoplasmic material into the lysosome. This occurs by invagination, meaning the inward folding of the lysosomal membrane, or cellular protrusion.

Chaperone-mediated autophagy, or CMA, is a very complex and specific pathway, which involves the recognition by the hsc70-containing complex. This means that a protein must contain the recognition site for this hsc70 complex which will allow it to bind to this chaperone, forming the CMA- substrate/chaperone complex. This complex then moves to the lysosomal membrane-bound protein that will recognise and bind with the CMA receptor. Upon recognition, the substrate protein gets unfolded and it is translocated across the lysosome membrane with the assistance of the lysosomal hsc70 chaperone. CMA is significantly different from other types of autophagy because it translocates protein material in a one by one manner, and it is extremely selective about what material crosses the lysosomal barrier.

Mitophagy is the selective degradation of mitochondria by autophagy. It often occurs to defective mitochondria following damage or stress. Mitophagy promotes the turnover of mitochondria and prevents the accumulation of dysfunctional mitochondria which can lead to cellular degeneration. It is mediated by Atg32 (in yeast) and NIX and its regulator BNIP3 in mammals. Mitophagy is regulated by PINK1 and parkin proteins. The occurrence of mitophagy is not limited to the damaged mitochondria but also involves undamaged ones.

Lipophagy is the degradation of lipids by autophagy, a function which has been shown to exist in both animal and fungal cells. The role of lipophagy in plant cells, however, remains elusive. In lipophagy the target are lipid structures called lipid droplets (LDs), spheric "organelles" with a core of mainly triacylglycerols (TAGs) and a unilayer of phospholipids and membrane proteins. In animal cells the main lipophagic pathway is via the engulfment of LDs by the phagophore, macroautophagy. In fungal cells on the other hand microplipophagy constitutes the main pathway and is especially well studied in the budding yeast Saccharomyces cerevisiae. Lipophagy was first discovered in mice and published 2009.

== Targeted interplay between bacterial pathogens and host autophagy ==
Autophagy targets genus-specific proteins, so orthologous proteins which share sequence homology with each other are recognized as substrates by a particular autophagy targeting protein. There exists a complementarity of autophagy targeting proteins which potentially increase infection risk upon mutation. The lack of overlap among the targets of the 3 autophagy proteins and the large overlap in terms of the genera show that autophagy could target different sets of bacterial proteins from the same pathogen. On one hand, the redundancy in targeting the same genera is beneficial for robust pathogen recognition. But, on the other hand, the complementarity in the specific bacterial proteins could make the host more susceptible to chronic disorders and infections if the gene encoding one of the autophagy targeting proteins becomes mutated, and the autophagy system is overloaded or suffers other malfunctions. Moreover, autophagy targets virulence factors and virulence factors responsible for more general functions such as nutrient acquisition and motility are recognized by multiple autophagy targeting proteins. And the specialized virulence factors such as autolysins, and iron sequestering proteins are potentially recognized uniquely by a single autophagy targeting protein. The autophagy proteins CALCOCO2/NDP52 and MAP1LC3/LC3 may have evolved specifically to target pathogens or pathogenic proteins for autophagic degradation. While SQSTM1/p62 targets more generic bacterial proteins containing a target motif but not related to virulence.

On the other hand, bacterial proteins from various pathogenic genera are also able to modulate autophagy. There are genus-specific patterns in the phases of autophagy that are potentially regulated by a given pathogen group. Some autophagy phases can only be modulated by particular pathogens, while some phases are modulated by multiple pathogen genera. Some of the interplay-related bacterial proteins have proteolytic and post-translational activity such as phosphorylation and ubiquitination and can interfere with the activity of autophagy proteins.

== Molecular biology ==
ATG is short for "AuTophaGy"-related, which is applied to both genes and proteins related to the biological process of autophagy. There are about 16-20 conserved ATG genes coding for many core ATG proteins conserved from yeast to humans. ATG may be part of the protein name (such as ATG7) or part of the gene name (such as ATG7), although all ATG proteins and genes do not follow this pattern (such as ULK1).

To give specific examples, the UKL1 enzyme (kinase complex) induces autophagosome biogenesis, and ATG13 (Autophagy-related protein 13) is required for phagosome formation.

Autophagy is executed by ATG genes. Prior to 2003, ten or more names were used, but after this point a unified nomenclature was devised by fungal autophagy researchers. The first autophagy genes were identified by genetic screens conducted in Saccharomyces cerevisiae. Following their identification those genes were functionally characterized and their orthologs in a variety of different organisms were identified and studied. Today, thirty-six Atg proteins have been classified as especially important for autophagy, of which 18 belong to the core machinery.

In mammals, amino acid sensing and additional signals such as growth factors and reactive oxygen species regulate the activity of the protein kinases mTOR and AMPK. These two kinases regulate autophagy through inhibitory phosphorylation of the Unc-51-like kinases ULK1 and ULK2 (mammalian homologues of Atg1). Induction of autophagy results in the dephosphorylation and activation of the ULK kinases. ULK is part of a protein complex containing Atg13, Atg101 and FIP200. ULK phosphorylates and activates Beclin-1 (mammalian homologue of Atg6), which is also part of a protein complex. The autophagy-inducible Beclin-1 complex contains the proteins PIK3R4(p150), Atg14L and the class III phosphatidylinositol 3-phosphate kinase (PI(3)K) Vps34. The active ULK and Beclin-1 complexes re-localize to the site of autophagosome initiation, the phagophore, where they both contribute to the activation of downstream autophagy components.

Once active, VPS34 phosphorylates the lipid phosphatidylinositol to generate phosphatidylinositol 3-phosphate (PtdIns(3)P) on the surface of the phagophore. The generated PtdIns(3)P is used as a docking point for proteins harboring a PtdIns(3)P binding motif. WIPI2, a PtdIns(3)P binding protein of the WIPI (WD-repeat protein interacting with phosphoinositides) protein family, was recently shown to physically bind ATG16L1. Atg16L1 is a member of an E3-like protein complex involved in one of two ubiquitin-like conjugation systems essential for autophagosome formation. The FIP200 cis-Golgi-derived membranes fuse with ATG16L1-positive endosomal membranes to form the prophagophore termed HyPAS (hybrid pre-autophagosomal structure). ATG16L1 binding to WIPI2 mediates ATG16L1's activity. This leads to downstream conversion of prophagophore into ATG8-positive phagophore via a ubiquitin-like conjugation system.

The first of the two ubiquitin-like conjugation systems involved in autophagy covalently binds the ubiquitin-like protein Atg12 to Atg5. The resulting conjugate protein then binds ATG16L1 to form an E3-like complex which functions as part of the second ubiquitin-like conjugation system. This complex binds and activates Atg3, which covalently attaches mammalian homologues of the ubiquitin-like yeast protein ATG8 (LC3A-C, GATE16, and GABARAPL1-3), the most studied being LC3 proteins, to the lipid phosphatidylethanolamine (PE) on the surface of autophagosomes. Lipidated LC3 contributes to the closure of autophagosomes, and enables the docking of specific cargos and adaptor proteins such as Sequestosome-1/p62. The completed autophagosome then fuses with a lysosome through the actions of multiple proteins, including SNAREs and UVRAG. Following the fusion LC3 is retained on the vesicle's inner side and degraded along with the cargo, while the LC3 molecules attached to the outer side are cleaved off by Atg4 and recycled. The contents of the autolysosome are subsequently degraded and their building blocks are released from the vesicle through the action of permeases.

Sirtuin 1 (SIRT1) stimulates autophagy by preventing acetylation of proteins (via deacetylation) required for autophagy as demonstrated in cultured cells and embryonic and neonatal tissues. This function provides a link between sirtuin expression and the cellular response to limited nutrients due to caloric restriction.

== Functions ==
The 2023 hallmarks list counts a declining ability to renew worn-out organelles, under the name macroautophagy, as one of the basic features of aging.

=== Nutrient starvation ===
Autophagy has roles in various cellular functions. One particular example is in yeasts, where the nutrient starvation induces a high level of autophagy. This allows unneeded proteins to be degraded and the amino acids recycled for the synthesis of proteins that are essential for survival. In higher eukaryotes, autophagy is induced in response to the nutrient depletion that occurs in animals at birth after severing off the trans-placental food supply, as well as that of nutrient starved cultured cells and tissues. Mutant yeast cells that have a reduced autophagic capability rapidly perish in nutrition-deficient conditions. Studies on the apg mutants suggest that autophagy via autophagic bodies is indispensable for protein degradation in the vacuoles under starvation conditions, and that at least 15 APG genes are involved in autophagy in yeast. A gene known as ATG7 has been implicated in nutrient-mediated autophagy, as mice studies have shown that starvation-induced autophagy was impaired in atg7-deficient mice.

=== Infection ===
Vesicular stomatitis virus is believed to be taken up by the autophagosome from the cytosol and translocated to the endosomes where detection takes place by a pattern recognition receptor called toll-like receptor 7, detecting single stranded RNA. Following activation of the toll-like receptor, intracellular signaling cascades are initiated, leading to induction of interferon and other antiviral cytokines. A subset of viruses and bacteria subvert the autophagic pathway to promote their own replication. Galectin-8 has recently been identified as an intracellular "danger receptor", able to initiate autophagy against intracellular pathogens. When galectin-8 binds to a damaged vacuole, it recruits an autophagy adaptor such as NDP52 leading to the formation of an autophagosome and bacterial degradation.

=== Repair mechanism ===
Autophagy degrades damaged organelles, cell membranes and proteins, and insufficient autophagy is thought to be one of the main reasons for the accumulation of damaged cells and aging. Autophagy and autophagy regulators are involved in response to lysosomal damage, often directed by galectins such as galectin-3 and galectin-8.

Repair of damaged DNA involves the recruitment of enzymes to the damaged site, but these enzymes must be removed upon completion of the repair process. Topoisomerase I cleavage complex is employed in the processing of DNA damages (e.g. DNA-protein crosslinks) in vertebrates, and this complex is selectively degraded by autophagy, presumably after it is no longer needed.

=== Programmed cell death ===
One of the mechanisms of programmed cell death (PCD) is associated with the appearance of autophagosomes and depends on autophagy proteins. This form of cell death most likely corresponds to a process that has been morphologically defined as autophagic PCD. One question that consistently arises, however, is whether autophagic activity in dying cells is the cause of death or is actually an attempt to prevent it. Morphological and histochemical studies have not so far proved a causative relationship between the autophagic process and cell death. In fact, there have recently been strong arguments that autophagic activity in dying cells might actually be a survival mechanism.

Studies of the metamorphosis of insects have shown cells undergoing a form of PCD that appears distinct from other forms; these have been proposed as examples of autophagic cell death. Recent pharmacological and biochemical studies have proposed that survival and lethal autophagy can be distinguished by the type and degree of regulatory signaling during stress particularly after viral infection. Although promising, these findings have not been examined in non-viral systems.

=== Meiosis ===
Mammalian fetal oocytes face several challenges to survival throughout the stages of meiotic prophase I prior to primordial follicle assembly. Each primordial follicle contains an immature primary oocyte. Before oocytes are enclosed into a primordial follicle, deficiencies of nutrients or growth factors might activate protective autophagy, but this can turn into death of the oocytes if starvation is prolonged.

Macroautophagy had been counted inside the loss of protein balance, and it was given its own heading after work showed that shutting autophagy down was enough to produce features of aging.

== Exercise ==
Autophagy is essential for basal homeostasis; it is also extremely important in maintaining muscle homeostasis during physical exercise. Autophagy at the molecular level is only partially understood. A study of mice shows that autophagy is important for the ever-changing demands of their nutritional and energy needs, particularly through the metabolic pathways of protein catabolism. In a 2012 study conducted by the University of Texas Southwestern Medical Center in Dallas, mutant mice (with a knock-in mutation of BCL2 phosphorylation sites to produce progeny that showed normal levels of basal autophagy yet were deficient in stress-induced autophagy) were tested to challenge this theory. Results showed that when compared to a control group, these mice illustrated a decrease in endurance and an altered glucose metabolism during acute exercise.

Another study demonstrated that skeletal muscle fibers of collagen VI in knockout mice showed signs of degeneration due to an insufficiency of autophagy which led to an accumulation of damaged mitochondria and excessive cell death. Exercise-induced autophagy was unsuccessful however; but when autophagy was induced artificially post-exercise, the accumulation of damaged organelles in collagen VI deficient muscle fibres was prevented and cellular homeostasis was maintained. Both studies demonstrate that autophagy induction may contribute to the beneficial metabolic effects of exercise and that it is essential in the maintaining of muscle homeostasis during exercise, particularly in collagen VI fibers.

Work at the Institute for Cell Biology, University of Bonn, showed that a certain type of autophagy, i.e. chaperone-assisted selective autophagy (CASA), is induced in contracting muscles and is required for maintaining the muscle sarcomere under mechanical tension. The CASA chaperone complex recognizes mechanically damaged cytoskeleton components and directs these components through a ubiquitin-dependent autophagic sorting pathway to lysosomes for disposal. This is necessary for maintaining muscle activity.

== Osteoarthritis ==
Because autophagy decreases with age and age is a major risk factor for osteoarthritis, the role of autophagy in the development of this disease is suggested. Proteins involved in autophagy are reduced with age in both human and mouse articular cartilage. Mechanical injury to cartilage explants in culture also reduced autophagy proteins. Autophagy is constantly activated in normal cartilage but it is compromised with age and precedes cartilage cell death and structural damage. Thus autophagy is involved in a normal protective process (chondroprotection) in the joint.

== Cancer ==
Cancer often occurs when several different pathways that regulate cell differentiation are disturbed. Autophagy plays an important role in cancer – both in protecting against cancer as well as potentially contributing to the growth of cancer. Autophagy can contribute to cancer by promoting survival of tumor cells that have been starved, or that degrade apoptotic mediators through autophagy: in such cases, use of inhibitors of the late stages of autophagy (such as chloroquine), on the cells that use autophagy to survive, increases the number of cancer cells killed by antineoplastic drugs.

The role of autophagy in cancer is one that has been highly researched and reviewed. There is evidence that emphasizes the role of autophagy as both a tumor suppressor and a factor in tumor cell survival. Recent research has shown, however, that autophagy is more likely to be used as a tumor suppressor according to several models.

=== Tumor suppressor ===
Several experiments have been done with mice and varying Beclin1, a protein that regulates autophagy. When the Beclin1 gene was altered to be heterozygous (Beclin 1±), the mice were found to be tumor-prone. However, when Beclin1 was overexpressed, tumor development was inhibited. Care should be exercised when interpreting phenotypes of beclin mutants and attributing the observations to a defect in autophagy, however: Beclin1 is generally required for phosphatidylinositol 3- phosphate production and as such it affects numerous lysosomal and endosomal functions, including endocytosis and endocytic degradation of activated growth factor receptors. In support of the possibility that Beclin1 affects cancer development through an autophagy-independent pathway is the fact that core autophagy factors which are not known to affect other cellular processes and are definitely not known to affect cell proliferation and cell death, such as Atg7 or Atg5, show a much different phenotype when the respective gene is knocked out, which does not include tumor formation. In addition, full knockout of Beclin1 is embryonic lethal whereas knockout of Atg7 or Atg5 is not.

Necrosis and chronic inflammation also has been shown to be limited through autophagy which helps protect against the formation of tumor cells.

=== Colorectal cancer ===
Colorectal cancer incidence is associated with a high-fat diet, and such a diet is linked to elevated levels of bile acids in the colon, particularly deoxycholic acid. Deoxycholic acid induces autophagy in non-cancer colon epithelial cells and this induction of autophagy contributes to cell survival when cells are stressed. Also autophagy is a survival pathway that is constitutively present in apoptosis-resistant colon cancer cells. The constitutive activation of autophagy in colon cancer cells, is thus a colon cancer cell survival strategy that needs to be overcome in colon cancer therapy.

=== Mechanism of cell death ===
Cells that undergo an extreme amount of stress experience cell death either through apoptosis or necrosis. Prolonged autophagy activation leads to a high turnover rate of proteins and organelles. A high rate above the survival threshold may kill cancer cells with a high apoptotic threshold. This technique can be utilized as a therapeutic cancer treatment.

=== Tumor cell survival ===
Alternatively, autophagy has also been shown to play a large role in tumor cell survival. In cancerous cells, autophagy is used as a way to deal with stress on the cell. Induction of autophagy by miRNA-4673, for example, is a pro-survival mechanism that improves the resistance of cancer cells to radiation. Once these autophagy related genes were inhibited, cell death was potentiated. The increase in metabolic energy is offset by autophagy functions. These metabolic stresses include hypoxia, nutrient deprivation, and an increase in proliferation. These stresses activate autophagy in order to recycle ATP and maintain survival of the cancerous cells. Autophagy has been shown to enable continued growth of tumor cells by maintaining cellular energy production. By inhibiting autophagy genes in these tumors cells, regression of the tumor and extended survival of the organs affected by the tumors were found. Furthermore, inhibition of autophagy has also been shown to enhance the effectiveness of anticancer therapies.

=== Therapeutic target ===
New developments in research have found that targeted autophagy may be a viable therapeutic solution in fighting cancer. As discussed above, autophagy plays both a role in tumor suppression and tumor cell survival. Thus, the qualities of autophagy can be used as a strategy for cancer prevention. The first strategy is to induce autophagy and enhance its tumor suppression attributes. The second strategy is to inhibit autophagy and thus induce apoptosis.

The first strategy has been tested by looking at dose-response anti-tumor effects during autophagy-induced therapies. These therapies have shown that autophagy increases in a dose-dependent manner. This is directly related to the growth of cancer cells in a dose-dependent manner as well. These data support the development of therapies that will encourage autophagy. Secondly, inhibiting the protein pathways directly known to induce autophagy may also serve as an anticancer therapy.

The second strategy is based on the idea that autophagy is a protein degradation system used to maintain homeostasis and the findings that inhibition of autophagy often leads to apoptosis. Inhibition of autophagy is riskier as it may lead to cell survival instead of the desired cell death.

=== Negative regulators of autophagy ===
Negative regulators of autophagy, such as mTOR, cFLIP, EGFR, (GAPR-1), and Rubicon are orchestrated to function within different stages of the autophagy cascade. The end-products of autophagic digestion may also serve as a negative-feedback regulatory mechanism to stop prolonged activity.

== Interface between inflammation and autophagy ==
Regulators of autophagy control regulators of inflammation, and vice versa. Cells of vertebrate organisms normally activate inflammation to enhance the capacity of the immune system to clear infections and to initiate the processes that restore tissue structure and function. Therefore, it is critical to couple regulation of mechanisms for removal of cellular and bacterial debris to the principal factors that regulate inflammation: The degradation of cellular components by the lysosome during autophagy serves to recycle vital molecules and generate a pool of building blocks to help the cell respond to a changing microenvironment. Proteins that control inflammation and autophagy form a network that is critical for tissue functions, which is dysregulated in cancer: In cancer cells, aberrantly expressed and mutant proteins increase the dependence of cell survival on the "rewired" network of proteolytic systems that protects malignant cells from apoptotic proteins and from recognition by the immune system. This renders cancer cells vulnerable to intervention on regulators of autophagy.

== Type 2 diabetes ==
Excessive activity of the crinophagy form of autophagy in the insulin-producing beta cells of the pancreas could reduce the quantity of insulin available for secretion, leading to type 2 diabetes.

== See also ==
- Apoptosis – Form of programmed cell death
- Autophagy database
- Autophagin – Protease
- Mitophagy – Autophagic process in which mitochondria are delivered to the vacuole and degraded
- Residual body
- Sub-lethal damage – Damaging changes to a biological cell
