= SRGAP1 =

Protein-coding gene in the species Homo sapiens

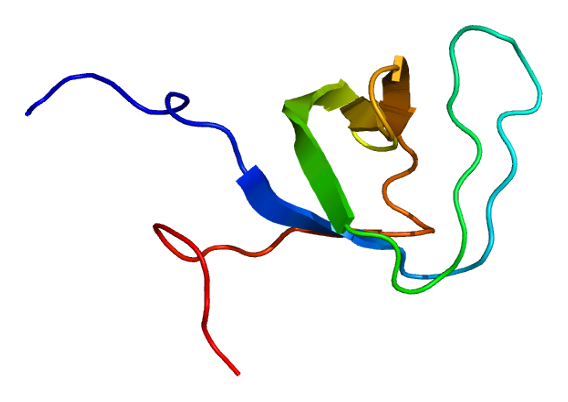

Identifiers
- Aliases: SRGAP1, ARHGAP13, NMTC2, SLIT-ROBO Rho GTPase activating protein 1
- External IDs: OMIM: 606523; MGI: 2152936; GeneCards: SRGAP1

Gene location (Human)
Chr.	Chromosome 12 (human)
Band	12q14.2	Start	63,843,761 bp
Band	12q14.2	End	64,162,217 bp

Gene location (Mouse)
Chr.	Chromosome 10 (mouse)
Band	10|10 D2	Start	121,616,896 bp
Band	10|10 D2	End	121,883,220 bp
RNA expression pattern
Bgee	Human / Mouse (ortholog); Top expressed in: buccal mucosa cell; internal globus pallidus; external globus pallidus; cartilage tissue; secondary oocyte; pancreatic epithelial cell; pancreatic ductal cell; ventral tegmental area; sural nerve; ganglionic eminence / Top expressed in: medial dorsal nucleus; mammillary body; lumbar spinal ganglion; molar; ventral tegmental area; zygote; genital tubercle; dorsomedial hypothalamic nucleus; olfactory epithelium; supraoptic nucleus; More reference expression data
BioGPS	n/a
Gene ontology
Molecular function	protein binding; GTPase activator activity
Cellular component	cytosol; cytoplasm
Biological process	negative regulation of cell migration; signal transduction; regulation of small GTPase mediated signal transduction; positive regulation of GTPase activity
Sources:Amigo / QuickGO
Orthologs
Databases	NCBI: entry; OMA: entry
Species	Human	Mouse
Entrez	57522	117600
Ensembl	ENSG00000196935	ENSMUSG00000020121
UniProt	Q7Z6B7	Q91Z69
RefSeq (mRNA)	NM_020762; NM_001346201	NM_001081037; NM_001242411
RefSeq (protein)	NP_001333130; NP_065813	NP_001074506; NP_001229340
Location (UCSC)	Chr 12: 63.84 – 64.16 Mb	Chr 10: 121.62 – 121.88 Mb
PubMed search
- Wikidata
View/Edit Human	View/Edit Mouse

SLIT-ROBO Rho GTPase-activating protein 1 is an enzyme that in humans is encoded by the SRGAP1 gene.
