= Aminopeptidase I =

Class of enzymes

Identifiers
- EC no.: 3.4.11.22
- CAS no.: 9031-94-1

Databases
- IntEnz: IntEnz view
- BRENDA: BRENDA entry
- ExPASy: NiceZyme view
- KEGG: KEGG entry
- MetaCyc: metabolic pathway
- PRIAM: profile
- PDB structures: RCSB PDB PDBe PDBsum
Search
- PMC: articles
- PubMed: articles
- NCBI: proteins

Aminopeptidase I (EC 3.4.11.22, aminopeptidase III, aminopeptidase yscI, leucine aminopeptidase IV, yeast aminopeptidase I) is an enzyme. This enzyme catalyses the following chemical reaction

Release of an N-terminal amino acid, preferably a neutral or hydrophobic one, from a polypeptide.

Aminoacyl-arylamides are poor substrates
