= RB1CC1 =

Protein-coding gene in the species Homo sapiens

Identifiers
- Aliases: RB1CC1, ATG17, CC1, FIP200, PPP1R131, RB1 inducible coiled-coil 1
- External IDs: OMIM: 606837; MGI: 1341850; GeneCards: RB1CC1

Gene location (Human)
| Chr. | Chromosome 8 (human) |
| Band | 8q11.23 | Start | 52,622,458 bp |
| Band | 8q11.23 | End | 52,745,843 bp |

Gene location (Mouse)
| Chr. | Chromosome 1 (mouse) |
| Band | 1|1 A1 | Start | 6,206,197 bp |
| Band | 1|1 A1 | End | 6,276,648 bp |
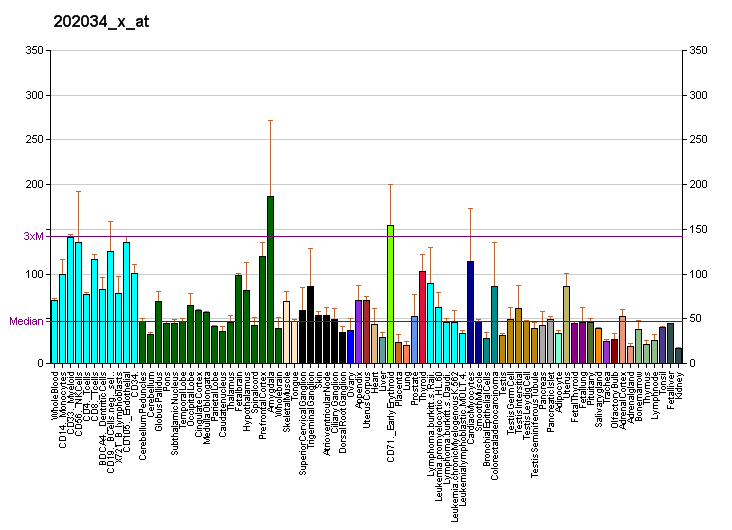

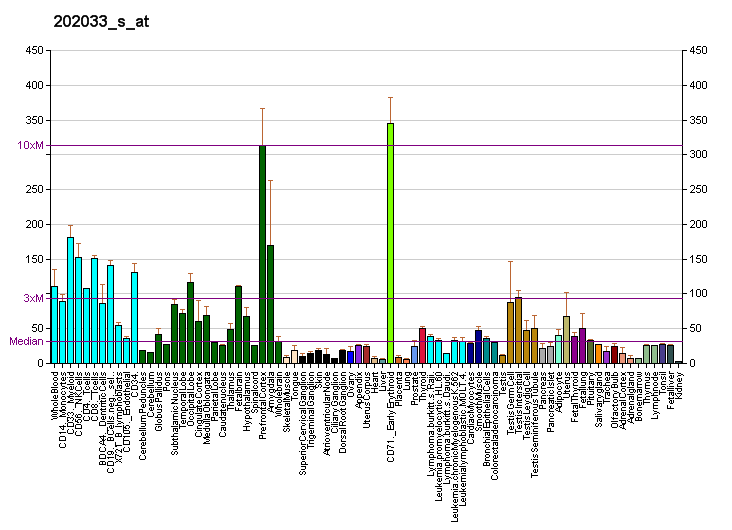
RNA expression pattern
| Bgee | Human / Mouse (ortholog); Top expressed in: buccal mucosa cell; bronchial epithelial cell; caput epididymis; postcentral gyrus; corpus epididymis; biceps brachii; tail of epididymis; jejunal mucosa; Skeletal muscle tissue of rectus abdominis; Skeletal muscle tissue of biceps brachii / Top expressed in: spermatocyte; spermatid; zygote; morula; genital tubercle; muscle of thigh; granulocyte; tail of embryo; dentate gyrus of hippocampal formation granule cell; secondary oocyte; More reference expression data |
| BioGPS | More reference expression data |
Gene ontology
| Molecular function | protein binding; protein kinase binding; molecular adaptor activity |
| Cellular component | phagophore assembly site membrane; nuclear membrane; Atg1/ULK1 kinase complex; phagophore assembly site; nucleus; cytoplasm; endoplasmic reticulum membrane; cytosol; extrinsic component of membrane; lysosome |
| Biological process | positive regulation of protein phosphorylation; regulation of transcription, DNA-templated; negative regulation of extrinsic apoptotic signaling pathway; negative regulation of apoptotic process; autophagosome assembly; transcription, DNA-templated; development of the heart; positive regulation of cell size; cell cycle; liver development; macroautophagy; autophagy; positive regulation of JNK cascade; autophagy of mitochondrion; autophagy of peroxisome; reticulophagy; glycophagy; regulation of macroautophagy; piecemeal microautophagy of the nucleus |
Sources:Amigo / QuickGO
Orthologs
| Databases | NCBI: entry; OMA: entry |
| Species | Human | Mouse |
| Entrez | 9821 | 12421 |
| Ensembl | ENSG00000023287 | ENSMUSG00000025907 |
| UniProt | Q8TDY2 | Q9ESK9 |
| RefSeq (mRNA) | NM_001083617; NM_014781 | NM_009826 |
| RefSeq (protein) | NP_001077086; NP_055596 | NP_033956 |
| Location (UCSC) | Chr 8: 52.62 – 52.75 Mb | Chr 1: 6.21 – 6.28 Mb |
| PubMed search |
- Wikidata
| View/Edit Human | View/Edit Mouse |

RB1-inducible coiled-coil protein 1 is a protein that in humans is encoded by the RB1CC1 gene.

== Interactions ==
RB1CC1 has been shown to interact with PTK2B, ASK1 and PTK2.
