= RPTOR =

Protein-coding gene in humans

Identifiers
- Aliases: RPTOR, KOG1, Mip1, regulatory associated protein of MTOR complex 1
- External IDs: OMIM: 607130; MGI: 1921620; GeneCards: RPTOR

Gene location (Human)
Chr.	Chromosome 17 (human)
Band	17q25.3	Start	80,544,819 bp
Band	17q25.3	End	80,966,371 bp

Gene location (Mouse)
Chr.	Chromosome 11 (mouse)
Band	11|11 E2	Start	119,493,731 bp
Band	11|11 E2	End	119,790,402 bp
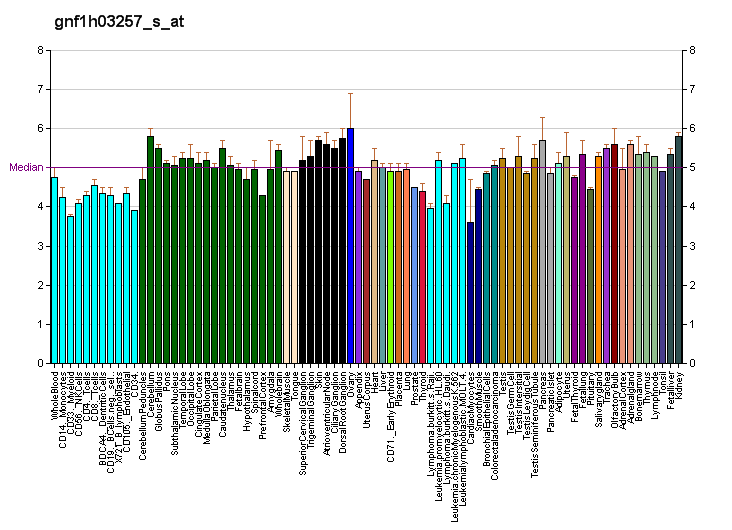

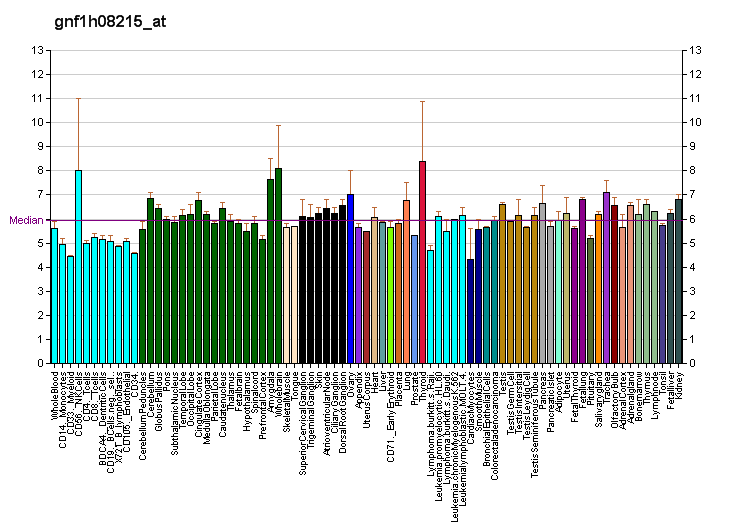
RNA expression pattern
Bgee	Human / Mouse (ortholog); Top expressed in: sural nerve; superficial temporal artery; gastrocnemius muscle; stromal cell of endometrium; popliteal artery; tibial arteries; muscle of thigh; muscle layer of sigmoid colon; bone marrow cell; apex of heart / Top expressed in: tail of embryo; lumbar subsegment of spinal cord; gastrula; genital tubercle; muscle of thigh; dentate gyrus of hippocampal formation granule cell; otic vesicle; spermatid; primary visual cortex; Rostral migratory stream; More reference expression data
BioGPS	More reference expression data
Gene ontology
Molecular function	14-3-3 protein binding; protein-containing complex binding; TFIIIC-class transcription factor complex binding; protein binding; protein kinase binding; protein-macromolecule adaptor activity; protein kinase activator activity; protein serine/threonine kinase inhibitor activity
Cellular component	lysosomal membrane; cytoplasm; TORC1 complex; soma; dendrite; nucleoplasm; cytosol; cytoplasmic stress granule; lysosome
Biological process	positive regulation of protein serine/threonine kinase activity; positive regulation of endothelial cell proliferation; regulation of phosphorylation; positive regulation of TOR signaling; cellular response to nutrient levels; TOR signaling; cellular response to amino acid stimulus; regulation of cell size; positive regulation of transcription by RNA polymerase III; regulation of cellular response to heat; activation of protein kinase activity; cellular response to starvation; regulation of autophagy; positive regulation of peptidyl-threonine phosphorylation; positive regulation of cell growth; positive regulation of peptidyl-serine phosphorylation; TORC1 signaling; negative regulation of protein serine/threonine kinase activity; positive regulation of G1/S transition of mitotic cell cycle; regulation of macroautophagy; cellular response to leucine; regulation of cell growth; viral process
Sources:Amigo / QuickGO
Orthologs
Databases	NCBI: entry; OMA: entry
Species	Human	Mouse
Entrez	57521	74370
Ensembl	ENSG00000141564	ENSMUSG00000025583
UniProt	Q8N122	Q8K4Q0
RefSeq (mRNA)	NM_020761; NM_001163034	NM_028898; NM_001306081
RefSeq (protein)	NP_001156506; NP_065812	n/a
Location (UCSC)	Chr 17: 80.54 – 80.97 Mb	Chr 11: 119.49 – 119.79 Mb
PubMed search
- Wikidata
View/Edit Human	View/Edit Mouse

Regulatory-associated protein of mTOR also known as raptor or KIAA1303 is an adapter protein that is encoded in humans by the RPTOR gene. The RPTOR protein is a component of the protein complex mTORC1, a nutrient sensor that promotes cell growth and anabolic reactions in response to nutrients or growth factors. Inside of mTORC1, RPTOR has two major known adaptor functions. In particular, it interacts with Rag GTPases (RRAGA, RRAGB, RRAGC and/or RRAGD), recruiting the complex to lysosome membranes, and also binds to TOS motif-containing proteins, and directs them to the complex’s phosphorylating domain. Two mRNAs from the gene have been identified that encode proteins of 1335 (isoform 1) and 1177 (isoform 2) amino acids long.

== Gene and expression ==
The human gene is located on human chromosome 17 with location of the cytogenic band at 17q25.3.

== Location ==
RPTOR is highly expressed in skeletal muscle and is somewhat less present in brain, lung, small intestine, kidney, and placenta tissue. Isoform 3 is widely expressed and most highly expressed in the nasal mucosa and pituitary. The lowest levels occur in the spleen. In the cell, RPTOR is present in cytoplasm, lysosomes, and cytoplasmic granules. Amino acid availability determines RPTOR targeting to lysosomes. In stressed cells, RPTOR associates with SPAG5 and accumulates in stress granules, which significantly reduces its presence in lysosomes.

== Function ==
RPTOR encodes part of a signaling pathway regulating cell growth which responds to nutrient and insulin levels. RPTOR is an evolutionarily conserved protein with multiple roles in the mTOR pathway. The adapter protein and mTOR kinase form a stoichiometric complex. The encoded protein also associates with eukaryotic initiation factor 4E-binding protein-1 and ribosomal protein S6 kinase. It upregulates S6 kinase, the downstream effector ribosomal protein, and it downregulates the mTOR kinase. RPTOR also has a positive role in maintaining cell size and mTOR protein expression. The association of mTOR and RPTOR is stabilized by nutrient deprivation and other conditions which suppress the mTOR pathway. Multiple transcript variants exist for this gene which encode different isoforms.

== Structure ==
RPTOR is a 150 kDa mTOR binding protein that is part of the mammalian target of rapamycin complex 1 (mTORC1). This complex contains mTOR, MLST8, RPTOR, AKT1S1/PRAS40, and DEPTOR. mTORC1 both binds to and is inhibited by FKBP12-rapamycin. mTORC1 activity is upregulated by mTOR and MPAK8 by insulin-stimulated phosphorylation at Ser-863. MAPK8 also causes phosphorylation at Ser-696, Thr-706, and Ser-863 as a result of osmotic stress. AMPK causes phosphorylation in the event of nutrient starvation and promotes 14-3-3 binding to raptor, which downregulates the mTORC1 complex. RPS6KA1 stimulates mTORC1 activity by phosphorylating at Ser-719, Ser-721, and Ser-722 as a response to growth factors.

== Interactions ==
- mTORC1 binds to and is inhibited by FKBP12-rapamycin
- RPTOR binds to 4EBP1 and RPS6KB1 directly whether or not it is associated with mTOR
- RPTOR binds to poorly phosphorylated or non-phosphorylated EIF4EBP1 preferentially, which is important for mTOR to be able to catalyze phosphorylation.
- RPTOR interacts with ULK1. This interaction depends on nutrients and is reduced in the case of starvation.
- When RPTOR is phosphorylated by AMPK, it interacts with 14-3-3 protein and inhibits its activity.
- RPTOR interacts with SPAG5, which competes with mTOR for binding RPTOR and causes decreased mTORC1 formation.
- RPTOR interacts with G3BP1. Oxidative stress increases the formation of the complex formed with RPTOR, G3BP1, and SPAG5

RPTOR has also been shown to interact with:

- FKBP1A,
- P70-S6 Kinase 1
- RHEB,
- RICTOR, and
- mammalian target of rapamycin (mTOR),

== Clinical significance ==
=== Signaling in cancer ===
The clinical significance of RPTOR is primarily due to its involvement in the mTOR pathway, which plays roles in mRNA translation, autophagy, and cell growth. Mutations in the PTEN tumor suppressor gene are the best known genetic deficiencies in cancer which affect mTOR signaling. These mutations are frequently found in a very large variety of cancers, including prostate, breast, lung, bladder, melanoma, endometrial, thyroid, brain, and renal carcinomas. PTEN inhibits the lipid-kinase activity of class I PtdIns3Ks, which phosphorylate PtdIns(4,5)P_{2} to create PtdIns(3,4,5)P_{3} (PIP3). PIP3 is a membrane-docking site for AKT and PDK1. In turn, active PDK1, along with mTORC1, phosphorylates S6K in the part of the mTOR pathway which promotes protein synthesis and cell growth.

The mTOR pathway has also been found to be involved in aging. Studies with C. elegans, fruitflies, and mice have shown that the lifespan of the organism is significantly increased by inhibiting mTORC1. mTORC1 phosphorylates Atg13 and stops it from forming the ULK1 kinase complex. This inhibits autophagy, the major degradation pathway in eukaryotic cells. Because mTORC1 inhibits autophagy and stimulates cell growth, it can cause damaged proteins and cell structures to accumulate. For this reason, dysfunction in the process of autophagy can contribute to several diseases, including cancer.

The mTOR pathway is important in many cancers. In cancer cells, astrin is required to suppress apoptosis during stress. Astrin recruits RPTOR to stress granules, inhibiting mTORC1 association and preventing apoptosis induced by mTORC1 hyperactivation. Because astrin is frequently upregulated in tumors, it is a potential target to sensitize tumors to apoptosis through the mTORC1 pathway.

RPTOR is overexpressed in pituitary adenoma, and its expression increases with tumor staging. RPTOR could be valuable in the prediction and prognosis of pituitary adenoma due to this correlation between protein expression and the growth and invasion of the tumor.

=== As a drug target ===
mTOR is found in two different complexes. When it associates with rapamycin-insensitive companion of mTOR (rictor), the complex is known as mTORC2 and it is insensitive to rapamycin. However, the complex mTORC1 formed by association with accessory protein RPTOR is sensitive to rapamycin. Rapamycin is a macrolide which is an immunosuppressant in humans that inhibits mTOR by binding to its intracellular receptor FKBP12. In many cancers, hyperactive AKT signaling leads to increased mTOR signaling, so rapamycin has been considered as an anti-cancer therapeutic for cancers with PTEN inactivation. Numerous clinical trials involving rapamycin analogs, such as CCI-779, RAD001, and AP23573, are ongoing. Early reports have been promising for renal-cell carcinoma, breast carcinomas, and non-small-cell lung carcinomas.

== See also ==
- RICTOR
- mTORC1
