= MTOR =

Mammalian protein found in humans

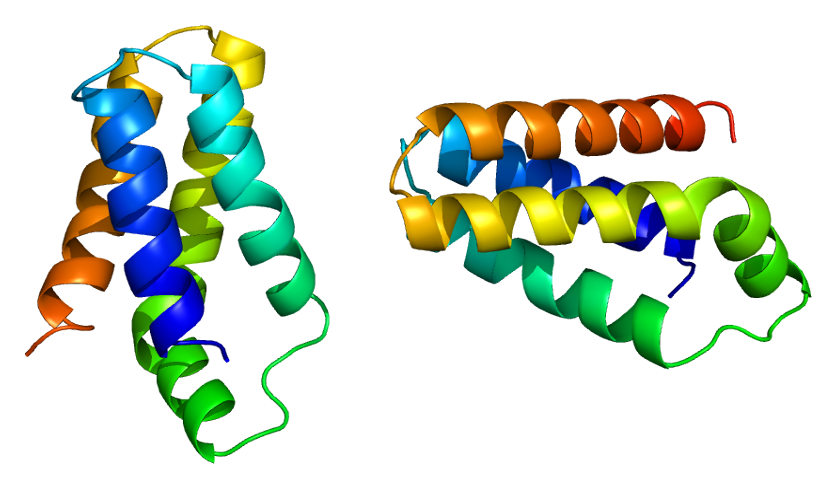

Identifiers
- Aliases: MTOR, FRAP, FRAP1, FRAP2, RAFT1, RAPT1, SKS, mechanistic target of rapamycin, mechanistic target of rapamycin kinase
- External IDs: OMIM: 601231; MGI: 1928394; GeneCards: MTOR
Available structures
PDB	Ortholog search: PDBe RCSB
PDB	List of PDB id codes 4JT6, 1AUE, 1FAP, 1NSG, 2FAP, 2GAQ, 2NPU, 2RSE, 3FAP, 4DRH, 4DRI, 4DRJ, 4FAP, 4JSN, 4JSP, 4JSV, 4JSX, 4JT5, 5FLC
Enzyme activity
EC #	BRENDA	ExPASy	KEGG	MetaCyc
2.7.10.2	↗	↗	↗	↗
2.7.11.1	↗	↗	↗	↗

Gene location (Human)
Chr.	Chromosome 1 (human)
Band	1p36.22	Start	11,106,535 bp
Band	1p36.22	End	11,262,551 bp

Gene location (Mouse)
Chr.	Chromosome 4 (mouse)
Band	4 E2|4 78.76 cM	Start	148,533,068 bp
Band	4 E2|4 78.76 cM	End	148,642,140 bp
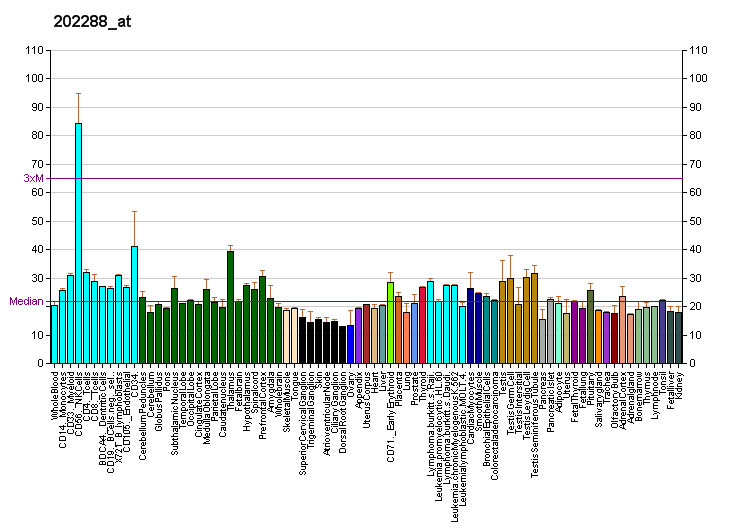
RNA expression pattern
Bgee	Human / Mouse (ortholog); Top expressed in: gonad; right hemisphere of cerebellum; left testis; right testis; gastrocnemius muscle; right frontal lobe; muscle of thigh; testicle; ventricular zone; apex of heart / Top expressed in: spermatid; spermatocyte; right kidney; dentate gyrus of hippocampal formation granule cell; superior frontal gyrus; genital tubercle; primary visual cortex; muscle of thigh; ventricular zone; neural layer of retina; More reference expression data
BioGPS	More reference expression data
Gene ontology
Molecular function	protein domain specific binding; TFIIIC-class transcription factor complex binding; kinase activity; ATP binding; protein serine/threonine kinase activity; transferase activity; ribosome binding; protein binding; protein kinase binding; nucleotide binding; phosphoprotein binding; protein kinase activity; protein-containing complex binding; identical protein binding; translation regulator activity
Cellular component	cytoplasm; cytosol; phosphatidylinositol 3-kinase complex; membrane; mitochondrion; TORC1 complex; organelle membrane; protein-containing complex; mitochondrial outer membrane; endoplasmic reticulum; TORC2 complex; Golgi apparatus; intracellular membrane-bounded organelle; nucleoplasm; soma; PML body; endoplasmic reticulum membrane; Golgi membrane; lysosomal membrane; dendrite; endomembrane system; nucleus; lysosome; glutamatergic synapse; postsynaptic cytosol
Biological process	germ cell development; positive regulation of protein phosphorylation; response to amino acid; positive regulation of lipid biosynthetic process; positive regulation of actin filament polymerization; positive regulation of skeletal muscle hypertrophy; positive regulation of granulosa cell proliferation; regulation of carbohydrate utilization; post-embryonic development; positive regulation of dendritic spine development; positive regulation of translation; positive regulation of eating behavior; protein phosphorylation; mRNA stabilization; cell projection organization; regulation of glycogen biosynthetic process; positive regulation of cell growth involved in cardiac muscle cell development; positive regulation of neuron maturation; positive regulation of glial cell proliferation; cellular response to hypoxia; negative regulation of cell size; response to cocaine; positive regulation of protein kinase B signaling; cardiac muscle contraction; maternal process involved in female pregnancy; ruffle organization; regulation of GTPase activity; cardiac muscle cell development; positive regulation of transcription of nucleolar large rRNA by RNA polymerase I; regulation of membrane permeability; response to insulin; regulation of myelination; regulation of fatty acid beta-oxidation; regulation of osteoclast differentiation; positive regulation of cholangiocyte proliferation; regulation of protein kinase B signaling; spinal cord development; positive regulation of peptidyl-tyrosine phosphorylation; social behavior; protein autophosphorylation; negative regulation of cholangiocyte apoptotic process; regulation of brown fat cell differentiation; regulation of protein kinase activity; negative regulation of protein phosphorylation; positive regulation of oligodendrocyte differentiation; regulation of carbohydrate metabolic process; regulation of actin cytoskeleton organization; voluntary musculoskeletal movement; phosphorylation; multicellular organism growth; negative regulation of muscle atrophy; wound healing; positive regulation of neurogenesis; response to morphine; positive regulation of sensory perception of pain; protein catabolic process; 'de novo' pyrimidine nucleobase biosynthetic process; cellular response to nutrient levels; energy reserve metabolic process; peptidyl-threonine phosphorylation; positive regulation of transcription by RNA polymerase III; positive regulation of smooth muscle cell proliferation; visual learning; positive regulation of myotube differentiation; positive regulation of cell death; positive regulation of endothelial cell proliferation; negative regulation of iodide transmembrane transport; cardiac muscle tissue development; positive regulation of nitric oxide biosynthetic process; regulation of response to food; heart morphogenesis; positive regulation of neuron death; cardiac cell development; negative regulation of protein ubiquitination; brain development; positive regulation of gene expression; long-term memory; heart valve morphogenesis; peptidyl-serine phosphorylation; positive regulation of neuron projection development; regulation of cellular response to heat; positive regulation of lamellipodium assembly; positive regulation of stress fiber assembly; signal transduction; regulation of protein phosphorylation; negative regulation of macroautophagy; anoikis; TOR signaling; DNA repair; regulation of cell size; negative regulation of autophagy; positive regulation of epithelial to mesenchymal transition; regulation of macroautophagy; cellular response to amino acid starvation; positive regulation of keratinocyte migration; cellular response to amino acid stimulus; cellular response to leucine; positive regulation of wound healing, spreading of epidermal cells; cellular response to leucine starvation; cellular response to starvation; TORC1 signaling; growth; regulation of cell growth; response to nutrient; activation of protein kinase B activity; T-helper 1 cell lineage commitment; response to activity; positive regulation of phosphoprotein phosphatase activity; negative regulation of calcineurin-NFAT signaling cascade; regulation of translation at synapse, modulating synaptic transmission; positive regulation of cytoplasmic translational initiation; response to nutrient levels
Sources:Amigo / QuickGO
Orthologs
Databases	NCBI: entry; OMA: entry
Species	Human	Mouse
Entrez	2475	56717
Ensembl	ENSG00000198793	ENSMUSG00000028991
UniProt	P42345	Q9JLN9
RefSeq (mRNA)	NM_004958; NM_001386500; NM_001386501	NM_020009
RefSeq (protein)	NP_004949	NP_064393
Location (UCSC)	Chr 1: 11.11 – 11.26 Mb	Chr 4: 148.53 – 148.64 Mb
PubMed search
- Wikidata
View/Edit Human	View/Edit Mouse

The mechanistic target of rapamycin (mTOR), also known as mammalian target of rapamycin, is a serine-threonine protein kinase that regulates cell growth, cell proliferation, cell motility, cell survival, protein synthesis, autophagy, and transcription. It belongs to the phosphatidylinositol 3-kinase-related kinase (PIKK) family and is evolutionarily conserved across eukaryotes. It also promotes the activation of insulin receptors and insulin-like growth factor 1 receptors.

== Discovery ==
=== Rapa Nui (Easter Island – Chile) ===
The study of TOR (target of rapamycin) originated in the 1960s with the Medical Expedition to Easter Island (METEI) in 1964–1965 organized by Canadian scientist Stanley Skoryna, with the goal of identifying natural products from plants and soil with possible therapeutic potential. In 1972, Surendra Nath Sehgal identified a small molecule, from the soil bacterium Streptomyces hygroscopicus, that he purified and initially reported to possess potent antifungal activity. He named it rapamycin, noting its original source and activity. Early testing revealed that rapamycin also had potent immunosuppressive and cytostatic anti-cancer activity. Rapamycin did not initially receive significant interest from the pharmaceutical industry until the 1980s, when Wyeth-Ayerst supported Sehgal's efforts to further investigate rapamycin's effect on the immune system. This eventually led to its FDA approval as an immunosuppressant following kidney transplantation. However, prior to its FDA approval, how rapamycin worked remained completely unknown.

=== Subsequent history ===
The discovery of TOR and mTOR stemmed from independent studies of the natural product rapamycin by Joseph Heitman, Rao Movva, and Michael N. Hall in 1991; by Stuart L. Schreiber and colleagues in 1994; by David M. Sabatini and Solomon H. Snyder in 1994; and by Candace J. Sabers, Mary M. Martin, Gregory J. Brunn, Josie M. Williams, Francis J. Dumont, Gregory Wiederrecht, and Robert T. Abraham in 1995. In 1991, working in yeast, Hall and colleagues identified the TOR1 and TOR2 genes. In 1993, Robert Cafferkey, George Livi, and colleagues, and Jeannette Kunz, Michael N. Hall, and colleagues independently cloned genes that mediate the toxicity of rapamycin in fungi, known as the TOR/DRR genes.

Rapamycin arrests fungal activity at the G1 phase of the cell cycle. In mammals, it suppresses the immune system by blocking the G1 to S phase transition in T-lymphocytes. Thus, it is used as an immunosuppressant following organ transplantation. Interest in rapamycin was renewed following the discovery of the structurally related immunosuppressive natural product FK506 (later called Tacrolimus) in 1987. In 1989–90, FK506 and rapamycin were determined to inhibit T-cell receptor (TCR) and IL-2 receptor signaling pathways, respectively. The two natural products were used to discover the FK506- and rapamycin-binding proteins, including FKBP12, and to provide evidence that FKBP12–FK506 and FKBP12–rapamycin might act through gain-of-function mechanisms that target distinct cellular functions. These investigations included key studies by Francis Dumont and Nolan Sigal at Merck contributing to show that FK506 and rapamycin behave as reciprocal antagonists. These studies implicated FKBP12 as a possible target of rapamycin, but suggested that the complex might interact with another element of the mechanistic cascade.

In 1991, calcineurin was identified as the target of FKBP12-FK506. That of FKBP12-rapamycin remained mysterious until genetic and molecular studies in yeast established FKBP12 as the target of rapamycin, and implicated TOR1 and TOR2 as the targets of FKBP12-rapamycin in 1991 and 1993, followed by studies in 1994 when several groups, working independently, discovered the mTOR kinase as its direct target in mammalian tissues. Sequence analysis of mTOR revealed it to be the direct ortholog of proteins encoded by the yeast target of rapamycin 1 and 2 (TOR1 and TOR2) genes, which Joseph Heitman, Rao Movva, and Michael N. Hall had identified in August 1991 and May 1993. Independently, George Livi and colleagues later reported the same genes, which they called dominant rapamycin resistance 1 and 2 (DRR1 and DRR2), in studies published in October 1993.

The protein, now called mTOR, was originally named FRAP by Stuart L. Schreiber and RAFT1 by David M. Sabatini; FRAP1 was used as its official gene symbol in humans. Because of these different names, mTOR, which had been first used by Robert T. Abraham, was increasingly adopted by the community of scientists working on the mTOR pathway to refer to the protein and in homage to the original discovery of the TOR protein in yeast that was named TOR, the Target of Rapamycin, by Joe Heitman, Rao Movva, and Mike Hall. TOR was originally discovered at the Biozentrum and Sandoz Pharmaceuticals in 1991 in Basel, Switzerland, and the name TOR pays further homage to this discovery, as TOR means doorway or gate in German, and the city of Basel was once ringed by a wall punctuated with gates into the city, including the iconic Spalentor. "mTOR" initially meant "mammalian target of rapamycin", but the meaning of the "m" was later changed to "mechanistic". Similarly, with subsequent discoveries the zebra fish TOR was named zTOR, the Arabidopsis thaliana TOR was named AtTOR, and the Drosophila TOR was named dTOR. In 2009 the FRAP1 gene name was officially changed by the HUGO Gene Nomenclature Committee (HGNC) to mTOR, which stands for mechanistic target of rapamycin.

The discovery of TOR and the subsequent identification of mTOR opened the door to the molecular and physiological study of what is now called the mTOR pathway and had a catalytic effect on the growth of the field of chemical biology, where small molecules are used as probes of biology.

== Function ==
mTOR integrates the input from upstream pathways, including insulin, growth factors (such as IGF-1 and IGF-2), and amino acids. mTOR also senses cellular nutrient, oxygen, and energy levels. The mTOR pathway is a central regulator of mammalian metabolism and physiology, with important roles in the function of tissues including liver, muscle, white and brown adipose tissue, and the brain, and is dysregulated in human diseases, such as diabetes, obesity, depression, and certain cancers. Rapamycin inhibits mTOR by associating with its intracellular receptor FKBP12. The FKBP12–rapamycin complex binds directly to the FKBP12-rapamycin binding (FRB) domain of mTOR, inhibiting its activity.

== In plants ==
Plants express the mechanistic target of rapamycin (mTOR) and have a TOR kinase complex. In plants, only the TORC1 complex is present unlike that of mammalian target of rapamycin which also contains the TORC2 complex. Plant species have TOR proteins in the protein kinase and FKBP-rapamycin binding (FRB) domains that share a similar amino acid sequence to mTOR in mammals.

Role of mTOR in plants

The TOR kinase complex has been known for having a role in the metabolism of plants. The TORC1 complex turns on when plants are living the proper environmental conditions to survive. Once activated, plant cells undergo particular anabolic reactions. These include plant development, translation of mRNA and the growth of cells within the plant. However, the TORC1 complex activation stops catabolic processes such as autophagy from occurring. TOR kinase signaling in plants has been found to aid in senescence, flowering, root and leaf growth, embryogenesis, and the meristem activation above the root cap of a plant. mTOR is also found to be highly involved in developing embryo tissue in plants.

== Complexes ==
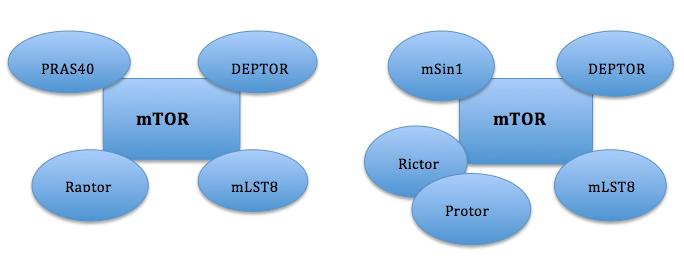
Schematic components of the mTOR complexes, mTORC1 (left) and mTORC2 (right). FKBP12, the biological target to which rapamycin binds, is a non-obligate component protein of mTORC1.

mTOR is the catalytic subunit of two structurally distinct complexes: mTORC1 and mTORC2. The two complexes localize to different subcellular compartments, thus affecting their activation and function. Upon activation by RHEB, mTORC1 localizes to the Ragulator-Rag complex on the lysosome surface where it then becomes active in the presence of sufficient amino acids.

=== mTORC1 ===
mTOR Complex 1 (mTORC1) is composed of mTOR, regulatory-associated protein of mTOR (Raptor), mammalian lethal with SEC13 protein 8 (mLST8) and the non-core components PRAS40 and DEPTOR. This complex functions as a nutrient/energy/redox sensor and controls protein synthesis. The activity of mTORC1 is regulated by rapamycin, insulin, growth factors, phosphatidic acid, certain amino acids and their derivatives (e.g., L-leucine and β-hydroxy β-methylbutyric acid), mechanical stimuli, and oxidative stress.

=== mTORC2 ===
mTOR Complex 2 (mTORC2) is composed of mTOR, rapamycin-insensitive companion of mTOR (RICTOR), MLST8, and mammalian stress-activated protein kinase interacting protein 1 (mSIN1). mTORC2 has been shown to function as an important regulator of the actin cytoskeleton through its stimulation of F-actin stress fibers, paxillin, RhoA, Rac1, Cdc42, and protein kinase C α (PKCα). mTORC2 also phosphorylates the serine/threonine protein kinase Akt/PKB on serine residue Ser473, thus affecting metabolism and survival. Phosphorylation of Akt's serine residue Ser473 by mTORC2 stimulates Akt phosphorylation on threonine residue Thr308 by PDK1 and leads to full Akt activation. In addition, mTORC2 exhibits tyrosine protein kinase activity and phosphorylates the insulin-like growth factor 1 receptor (IGF-1R) and insulin receptor (InsR) on the tyrosine residues Tyr1131/1136 and Tyr1146/1151, respectively, leading to full activation of IGF-IR and InsR.

=== Inhibition by rapamycin ===
Rapamycin (Sirolimus) inhibits mTORC1, resulting in the suppression of cellular senescence. This appears to provide most of the beneficial effects of the drug (including life-span extension in animal studies). Suppression of insulin resistance by sirtuins accounts for at least some of this effect. Impaired sirtuin 3 leads to mitochondrial dysfunction.

Rapamycin has a more complex effect on mTORC2, inhibiting it only in certain cell types under prolonged exposure. Disruption of mTORC2 produces the diabetic-like symptoms of decreased glucose tolerance and insensitivity to insulin.

== Gene deletion experiments ==
The mTORC2 signaling pathway is less defined than the mTORC1 signaling pathway. The functions of the components of the mTORC complexes have been studied using knockdowns and knockouts and were found to produce the following phenotypes:

- NIP7: Knockdown reduced mTORC2 activity that is indicated by decreased phosphorylation of mTORC2 substrates.
- RICTOR: Overexpression leads to metastasis and knockdown inhibits growth factor-induced PKC-phosphorylation. Constitutive deletion of Rictor in mice leads to embryonic lethality, while tissue specific deletion leads to a variety of phenotypes; a common phenotype of Rictor deletion in liver, white adipose tissue, and pancreatic beta cells is systemic glucose intolerance and insulin resistance in one or more tissues. Decreased Rictor expression in mice decreases male, but not female, lifespan.
- mTOR: Inhibition of mTORC1 and mTORC2 by PP242 [2-(4-Amino-1-isopropyl-1H-pyrazolo[3,4-d]pyrimidin-3-yl)-1H-indol-5-ol] leads to autophagy or apoptosis; inhibition of mTORC2 alone by PP242 prevents phosphorylation of Ser-473 site on AKT and arrests the cells in G1 phase of the cell cycle. Genetic reduction of mTOR expression in mice significantly increases lifespan.
- PDK1: Knockout is lethal; hypomorphic allele results in smaller organ volume and organism size but normal AKT activation.
- AKT: Knockout mice experience spontaneous apoptosis (AKT1), severe diabetes (AKT2), small brains (AKT3), and growth deficiency (AKT1/AKT2). Mice heterozygous for AKT1 have increased lifespan.
- TOR1, the S. cerevisiae orthologue of mTORC1, is a regulator of both carbon and nitrogen metabolism; TOR1 KO strains regulate response to nitrogen as well as carbon availability, indicating that it is a key nutritional transducer in yeast.

== Clinical significance ==
=== Aging ===
mTOR signaling pathway

Decreased TOR activity has been found to increase life span in S. cerevisiae, C. elegans, and D. melanogaster. The mTOR inhibitor rapamycin has been confirmed to increase lifespan in mice. By 2023, the National Institute on Aging's Interventions Testing Program had reported lifespan extension with rapamycin. At least ten other research groups had also reported it. The effect was seen in inbred, outbred and genetically mixed mice of both sexes. Unlike caloric restriction, rapamycin still extended lifespan when started at 20 months of age. This age is roughly equivalent to 60 human years. Benefits were also seen with intermittent dosing and with brief treatment just after birth. They were also seen when treatment began in mice that were already past middle age.

It is hypothesized that some dietary regimes, like caloric restriction and methionine restriction, cause lifespan extension by decreasing mTOR activity. Some studies have suggested that mTOR signaling may increase during aging, at least in specific tissues like adipose tissue, and rapamycin may act in part by blocking this increase. An alternative theory is mTOR signaling is an example of antagonistic pleiotropy, and while high mTOR signaling is good during early life, it is maintained at an inappropriately high level in old age. Calorie restriction and methionine restriction may act in part by limiting levels of essential amino acids including leucine and methionine, which are potent activators of mTOR. The administration of leucine into the rat brain has been shown to decrease food intake and body weight via activation of the mTOR pathway in the hypothalamus.

According to the free radical theory of aging, reactive oxygen species cause damage to mitochondrial proteins and decrease ATP production. Subsequently, via ATP sensitive AMPK, the mTOR pathway is inhibited and ATP-consuming protein synthesis is downregulated, since mTORC1 initiates a phosphorylation cascade activating the ribosome. Hence, the proportion of damaged proteins is enhanced. Moreover, disruption of mTORC1 directly inhibits mitochondrial respiration. These positive feedbacks on the aging process are counteracted by protective mechanisms: Decreased mTOR activity (among other factors) upregulates removal of dysfunctional cellular components via autophagy.

mTOR is a key initiator of the senescence-associated secretory phenotype (SASP). Interleukin 1 alpha (IL1A) is found on the surface of senescent cells where it contributes to the production of SASP factors due to a positive feedback loop with NF-κB. Translation of mRNA for IL1A is highly dependent upon mTOR activity. mTOR activity increases levels of IL1A, mediated by MAPKAPK2. mTOR inhibition of ZFP36L1 prevents this protein from degrading transcripts of numerous components of SASP factors.

=== Cancer ===
Over-activation of mTOR signaling significantly contributes to the initiation and development of tumors and mTOR activity was found to be deregulated in many types of cancer including breast, prostate, lung, melanoma, bladder, brain, and renal carcinomas. Reasons for constitutive activation are several. Among the most common are mutations in tumor suppressor PTEN gene. PTEN phosphatase negatively affects mTOR signalling through interfering with the effect of PI3K, an upstream effector of mTOR. Additionally, mTOR activity is deregulated in many cancers as a result of increased activity of PI3K or Akt. Similarly, overexpression of downstream mTOR effectors 4E-BP1, S6K1, S6K2 and eIF4E leads to poor cancer prognosis. Also, mutations in TSC proteins that inhibit the activity of mTOR may lead to a condition named tuberous sclerosis complex, which exhibits as benign lesions and increases the risk of renal cell carcinoma.

Increasing mTOR activity was shown to drive cell cycle progression and increase cell proliferation mainly due to its effect on protein synthesis. Moreover, active mTOR supports tumor growth also indirectly by inhibiting autophagy. Constitutively activated mTOR functions in supplying carcinoma cells with oxygen and nutrients by increasing the translation of HIF1A and supporting angiogenesis. mTOR also aids in another metabolic adaptation of cancerous cells to support their increased growth rate—activation of glycolytic metabolism. Akt2, a substrate of mTOR, specifically of mTORC2, upregulates expression of the glycolytic enzyme PKM2 thus contributing to the Warburg effect.

=== Central nervous system disorders / brain function ===
In the healthy brain, mTOR signalling is needed for spatial learning. It is also needed for long-lasting forms of synaptic plasticity, such as the late phase of long-term potentiation. Because maintaining synapses and dendritic spines depends on making new proteins, mTORC1 supports the processes behind learning and long-term memory. Growth factors that aid memory, such as brain-derived neurotrophic factor (BDNF), work partly by activating mTOR. Conversely, blocking mTORC1 with rapamycin or by genetic means prevents several forms of memory consolidation, including fear conditioning.

==== Autism ====
mTOR is implicated in the failure of a 'pruning' mechanism of the excitatory synapses in autism spectrum disorders.

==== Epilepsy ====
The disorders known as mTORopathies share overactive mTOR signalling and epilepsy that often does not respond to anti-seizure drugs. They include tuberous sclerosis, a disorder affecting several organ systems. It is caused by mutations in the mTOR regulators TSC1 or TSC2. Its neurological features include epilepsy, focal cortical dysplasia and neuropsychiatric conditions. Focal cortical dysplasia type II is a leading cause of drug-resistant epilepsy. It is caused by somatic mutations in the brain that activate the mTOR pathway, in genes such as MTOR, AKT3, PIK3CA and RHEB.

The EXIST-3 trial was described as the first large precision-medicine trial in a genetic epilepsy. In this randomized, double-blind, placebo-controlled trial, the mTOR inhibitor everolimus reduced seizures in people with drug-resistant epilepsy due to tuberous sclerosis. Among participants with high blood levels of the drug, 40% had their seizures more than halved, compared with 15% of those on placebo. In rodent models of DEPDC5-related epilepsy and focal cortical dysplasia type II, rapamycin has also reduced seizures.

==== Alzheimer's disease ====
mTOR signaling intersects with Alzheimer's disease (AD) pathology in several aspects, suggesting its potential role as a contributor to disease progression. In general, findings demonstrate mTOR signaling hyperactivity in AD brains. For example, postmortem studies of human AD brain reveal dysregulation in PTEN, Akt, S6K, and mTOR. mTOR signaling appears to be closely related to the presence of soluble amyloid beta (Aβ) and tau proteins, which aggregate and form two hallmarks of the disease, Aβ plaques and neurofibrillary tangles, respectively. In vitro studies have shown Aβ to be an activator of the PI3K/AKT pathway, which in turn activates mTOR. In addition, applying Aβ to N2K cells increases the expression of p70S6K, a downstream target of mTOR known to have higher expression in neurons that eventually develop neurofibrillary tangles. Chinese hamster ovary cells transfected with the 7PA2 familial AD mutation also exhibit increased mTOR activity compared to controls, and the hyperactivity is blocked using a gamma-secretase inhibitor. These in vitro studies suggest that increasing Aβ concentrations increases mTOR signaling; however, significantly large, cytotoxic Aβ concentrations are thought to decrease mTOR signaling.

Consistent with data observed in vitro, mTOR activity and activated p70S6K have been shown to be significantly increased in the cortex and hippocampus of animal models of AD compared to controls. Pharmacologic or genetic removal of the Aβ in animal models of AD eliminates the disruption in normal mTOR activity, pointing to the direct involvement of Aβ in mTOR signaling. In addition, by injecting Aβ oligomers into the hippocampi of normal mice, mTOR hyperactivity is observed. Cognitive impairments characteristic of AD appear to be mediated by the phosphorylation of PRAS-40, which detaches from and allows for the mTOR hyperactivity when it is phosphorylated; inhibiting PRAS-40 phosphorylation prevents Aβ-induced mTOR hyperactivity. Given these findings, the mTOR signaling pathway appears to be one mechanism of Aβ-induced toxicity in AD.

The hyperphosphorylation of tau proteins into neurofibrillary tangles is one hallmark of AD. p70S6K activation has been shown to promote tangle formation as well as mTOR hyperactivity through increased phosphorylation and reduced dephosphorylation. It has also been proposed that mTOR contributes to tau pathology by increasing the translation of tau and other proteins.

Synaptic plasticity is a key contributor to learning and memory, two processes that are severely impaired in AD patients. Translational control, or the maintenance of protein homeostasis, has been shown to be essential for neural plasticity and is regulated by mTOR. Both protein over- and under-production via mTOR activity seem to contribute to impaired learning and memory. Furthermore, given that deficits resulting from mTOR overactivity can be alleviated through treatment with rapamycin, it is possible that mTOR plays an important role in affecting cognitive functioning through synaptic plasticity. Further evidence for mTOR activity in neurodegeneration comes from recent findings demonstrating that eIF2α-P, an upstream target of the mTOR pathway, mediates cell death in prion diseases through sustained translational inhibition.

Some evidence points to mTOR's role in reduced Aβ clearance as well. mTOR is a negative regulator of autophagy; therefore, hyperactivity in mTOR signaling should reduce Aβ clearance in the AD brain. Disruptions in autophagy may be a potential source of pathogenesis in protein misfolding diseases, including AD. Studies using mouse models of Huntington's disease demonstrate that treatment with rapamycin facilitates the clearance of huntingtin aggregates. Perhaps the same treatment may be useful in clearing Aβ deposits as well.

==== Parkinson's disease ====
As in Alzheimer's disease, mTOR appears to be upregulated in the brains of people with Parkinson's disease, and autophagosomes build up there. Defective autophagy may contribute to the accumulation of alpha-synuclein in Parkinson's disease and dementia with Lewy bodies. It has been suggested that stimulating autophagy with mTOR inhibitors such as rapamycin or everolimus could help clear the protein.

=== Lymphoproliferative diseases ===
Hyperactive mTOR pathways have been identified in certain lymphoproliferative diseases such as autoimmune lymphoproliferative syndrome (ALPS), multicentric Castleman disease, and post-transplant lymphoproliferative disorder (PTLD).

=== Protein synthesis and cell growth ===
mTORC1 activation is required for myofibrillar muscle protein synthesis and skeletal muscle hypertrophy in humans in response to both physical exercise and ingestion of certain amino acids or amino acid derivatives. Persistent inactivation of mTORC1 signaling in skeletal muscle facilitates the loss of muscle mass and strength during muscle wasting in old age, cancer cachexia, and muscle atrophy from physical inactivity. mTORC2 activation appears to mediate neurite outgrowth in differentiated mouse neuro2a cells. Intermittent mTOR activation in prefrontal neurons by β-hydroxy β-methylbutyrate inhibits age-related cognitive decline associated with dendritic pruning in animals, which is a phenomenon also observed in humans.

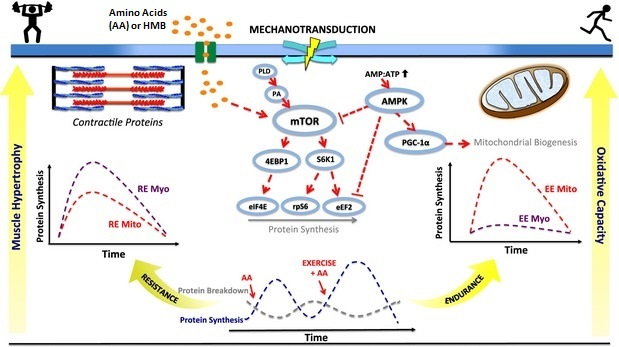
Diagram of the molecular signaling cascades that are involved in myofibrillar muscle protein synthesis and mitochondrial biogenesis in response to physical exercise and specific amino acids or their derivatives (primarily leucine and HMB). Many amino acids derived from food protein promote the activation of mTORC1 and increase protein synthesis by signaling through Rag GTPases.
Abbreviations and representations:
• PLD: phospholipase D
• PA: phosphatidic acid
• mTOR: mechanistic target of rapamycin
• AMP: adenosine monophosphate
• ATP: adenosine triphosphate
• AMPK: AMP-activated protein kinase
• PGC‐1α: peroxisome proliferator-activated receptor gamma coactivator-1α
• S6K1: p70S6 kinase
• 4EBP1: eukaryotic translation initiation factor 4E-binding protein 1
• eIF4E: eukaryotic translation initiation factor 4E
• RPS6: ribosomal protein S6
• eEF2: eukaryotic elongation factor 2
• RE: resistance exercise; EE: endurance exercise
• Myo: myofibrillar; Mito: mitochondrial
• AA: amino acids
• HMB: β-hydroxy β-methylbutyric acid
• ↑ represents activation
• Τ represents inhibition

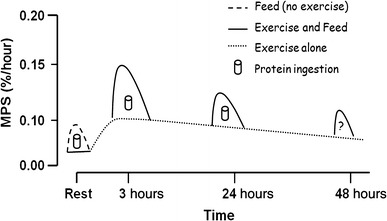
Resistance training stimulates muscle protein synthesis (MPS) for a period of up to 48 hours following exercise (shown by dotted line). Ingestion of a protein-rich meal at any point during this period will augment the exercise-induced increase in muscle protein synthesis (shown by solid lines).

=== Lysosomal damage inhibits mTOR and induces autophagy ===
Active mTORC1 is positioned on lysosomes. mTOR is inhibited when lysosomal membrane is damaged by various exogenous or endogenous agents, such as invading bacteria, membrane-permeant chemicals yielding osmotically active products (this type of injury can be modeled using membrane-permeant dipeptide precursors that polymerize in lysosomes), amyloid protein aggregates (see above section on Alzheimer's disease) and cytoplasmic organic or inorganic inclusions including urate crystals and crystalline silica. The process of mTOR inactivation following lysosomal/endomembrane damage is mediated by the protein complex termed GALTOR. At the heart of GALTOR is galectin-8, a member of β-galactoside binding superfamily of cytosolic lectins termed galectins, which recognizes lysosomal membrane damage by binding to the exposed glycans on the lumenal side of the delimiting endomembrane. Following membrane damage, galectin-8, which normally associates with mTOR under homeostatic conditions, no longer interacts with mTOR but now instead binds to SLC38A9, RRAGA/RRAGB, and LAMTOR1, inhibiting Ragulator's (LAMTOR1-5 complex) guanine nucleotide exchange function.

mTOR is a negative regulator of autophagy in general, best studied during response to starvation, which is a metabolic response. During lysosomal damage however, mTOR inhibition activates autophagy response in its quality control function, leading to the process termed lysophagy that removes damaged lysosomes. At this stage another galectin, galectin-3, interacts with TRIM16 to guide selective autophagy of damaged lysosomes. TRIM16 gathers ULK1 and principal components (Beclin 1 and ATG16L1) of other complexes (Beclin 1-VPS34-ATG14 and ATG16L1-ATG5-ATG12) initiating autophagy, many of them being under negative control of mTOR directly such as the ULK1-ATG13 complex, or indirectly, such as components of the class III PI3K (Beclin 1, ATG14 and VPS34) since they depend on activating phosphorylations by ULK1 when it is not inhibited by mTOR. These autophagy-driving components physically and functionally link up with each other integrating all processes necessary for autophagosomal formation: (i) the ULK1-ATG13-FIP200/RB1CC1 complex associates with the LC3B/GABARAP conjugation machinery through direct interactions between FIP200/RB1CC1 and ATG16L1, (ii) ULK1-ATG13-FIP200/RB1CC1 complex associates with the Beclin 1-VPS34-ATG14 via direct interactions between ATG13's HORMA domain and ATG14, (iii) ATG16L1 interacts with WIPI2, which binds to PI3P, the enzymatic product of the class III PI3K Beclin 1-VPS34-ATG14. Thus, mTOR inactivation, initiated through GALTOR upon lysosomal damage, plus a simultaneous activation via galectin-9 (which also recognizes lysosomal membrane breach) of AMPK that directly phosphorylates and activates key components (ULK1, Beclin 1) of the autophagy systems listed above and further inactivates mTORC1, allows for strong autophagy induction and autophagic removal of damaged lysosomes.

Additionally, several types of ubiquitination events parallel and complement the galectin-driven processes: Ubiquitination of TRIM16-ULK1-Beclin-1 stabilizes these complexes to promote autophagy activation as described above. ATG16L1 has an intrinsic binding affinity for ubiquitin; whereas ubiquitination by a glycoprotein-specific FBXO27-endowed ubiquitin ligase of several damage-exposed glycosylated lysosomal membrane proteins such as LAMP1, LAMP2, GNS/N-acetylglucosamine-6-sulfatase, TSPAN6/tetraspanin-6, PSAP/prosaposin, and TMEM192/transmembrane protein 192 may contribute to the execution of lysophagy via autophagic receptors such as p62/SQSTM1, which is recruited during lysophagy, or other to be determined functions.

=== Scleroderma ===
Scleroderma, also known as systemic sclerosis, is a chronic systemic autoimmune disease characterised by hardening (sclero) of the skin (derma) that affects internal organs in its more severe forms. mTOR plays a role in fibrotic diseases and autoimmunity, and blockade of the mTORC pathway is under investigation as a treatment for scleroderma.

=== Smith–kingsmore syndrome ===
A rare gain-of-function mutation causes Smith–Kingsmore syndrome.

== mTOR inhibitors as therapies ==
=== Transplantation ===
mTOR inhibitors, e.g. rapamycin, are already used to prevent transplant rejection.

=== Glycogen storage disease ===
Some articles reported that rapamycin can inhibit mTORC1 so that the phosphorylation of GS (glycogen synthase) can be increased in skeletal muscle. This discovery represents a potential novel therapeutic approach for glycogen storage disease that involve glycogen accumulation in muscle.

=== Anti-cancer ===
There are two primary mTOR inhibitors used in the treatment of human cancers, temsirolimus and everolimus. mTOR inhibitors have found use in the treatment of a variety of malignancies, including renal cell carcinoma (temsirolimus) and pancreatic cancer, breast cancer, and renal cell carcinoma (everolimus). The complete mechanism of these agents is not clear, but they are thought to function by impairing tumour angiogenesis and causing impairment of the G1/S transition.

=== Anti-aging ===
mTOR inhibitors may be useful for treating/preventing several age-associated conditions, including neurodegenerative diseases such as Alzheimer's disease and Parkinson's disease. After a short-term treatment with the mTOR inhibitors dactolisib and everolimus, in elderly (65 and older), treated subjects had a reduced number of infections over the course of a year.

Various natural compounds, including epigallocatechin gallate (EGCG), caffeine, curcumin, berberine, quercetin, resveratrol and pterostilbene, have been reported to inhibit mTOR when applied to isolated cells in culture. As yet no high quality evidence exists that these substances inhibit mTOR signaling or extend lifespan when taken as dietary supplements by humans, despite encouraging results in animals such as fruit flies and mice. Various trials are ongoing.

== Interactions ==
Mechanistic target of rapamycin has been shown to interact with:

- ABL1,
- AKT1,
- IGF-IR,
- InsR,
- CLIP1,
- EIF3F
- EIF4EBP1,
- FKBP1A,
- GPHN,
- KIAA1303,
- PRKCD,
- RHEB,
- RICTOR,
- RPS6KB1,
- STAT1,
- STAT3,
- Two-pore channels: TPCN1; TPCN2, and
- UBQLN1.
