= RICTOR =

Protein-coding gene in the species Homo sapiens

Identifiers
- Aliases: RICTOR, AVO3, PIA, hAVO3, RPTOR independent companion of MTOR complex 2
- External IDs: OMIM: 609022; MGI: 1926007; GeneCards: RICTOR

Gene location (Human)
Chr.	Chromosome 5 (human)
Band	5p13.1	Start	38,937,920 bp
Band	5p13.1	End	39,074,399 bp

Gene location (Mouse)
Chr.	Chromosome 15 (mouse)
Band	15|15 A1	Start	6,737,860 bp
Band	15|15 A1	End	6,829,882 bp
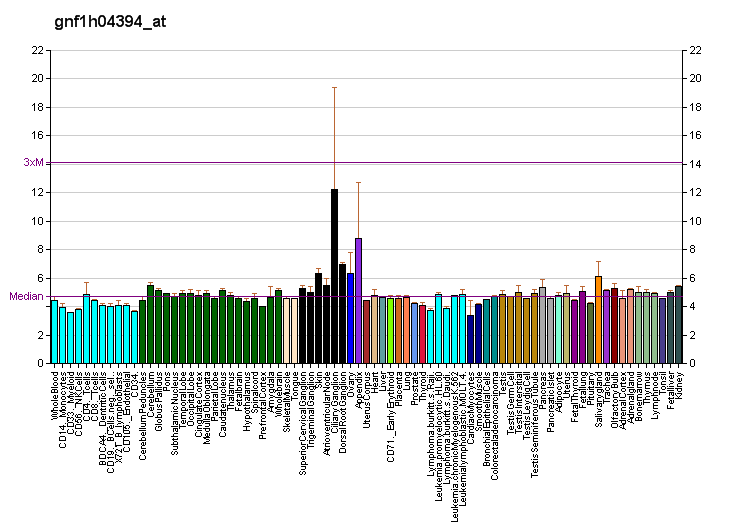
RNA expression pattern
Bgee	Human / Mouse (ortholog); Top expressed in: corpus callosum; tibialis anterior muscle; mucosa of paranasal sinus; cardiac muscle tissue of right atrium; superficial temporal artery; myocardium of left ventricle; Brodmann area 23; Skeletal muscle tissue of rectus abdominis; deltoid muscle; tail of epididymis / Top expressed in: lobe of cerebellum; cerebellar vermis; secondary oocyte; Rostral migratory stream; zygote; inferior colliculi; mesenteric lymph nodes; habenula; dorsomedial hypothalamic nucleus; paraventricular nucleus of hypothalamus; More reference expression data
BioGPS	More reference expression data
Gene ontology
Molecular function	ribosome binding; protein binding; enzyme activator activity; protein kinase binding
Cellular component	cytosol; TORC2 complex
Biological process	regulation of protein phosphorylation; actin cytoskeleton reorganization; positive regulation of protein kinase B signaling; positive regulation of endothelial cell proliferation; positive regulation of actin filament polymerization; regulation of actin cytoskeleton organization; embryo development; regulation of GTPase activity; regulation of phosphorylation; establishment or maintenance of actin cytoskeleton polarity; multicellular organism development; TOR signaling; peptidyl-serine phosphorylation; regulation of peptidyl-serine phosphorylation; regulation of protein kinase B signaling; establishment of cell polarity; regulation of inflammatory response; positive regulation of peptidyl-tyrosine phosphorylation; regulation of gene expression; regulation of establishment of cell polarity; positive regulation of TOR signaling; activation of protein kinase B activity; embryo development ending in birth or egg hatching; viral process
Sources:Amigo / QuickGO
Orthologs
Databases	NCBI: entry; OMA: entry
Species	Human	Mouse
Entrez	253260	78757
Ensembl	ENSG00000164327	ENSMUSG00000050310
UniProt	Q6R327	Q6QI06
RefSeq (mRNA)	NM_001285439; NM_001285440; NM_152756	NM_030168
RefSeq (protein)	NP_001272368; NP_001272369; NP_689969	NP_084444
Location (UCSC)	Chr 5: 38.94 – 39.07 Mb	Chr 15: 6.74 – 6.83 Mb
PubMed search
- Wikidata
View/Edit Human	View/Edit Mouse

Rapamycin-insensitive companion of mammalian target of rapamycin (RICTOR) is a protein that in humans is encoded by the RICTOR gene.

RICTOR and mTOR are components of a protein complex that integrates nutrient- and growth factor-derived signals to regulate cell growth.

== Structure ==
The gene RICTOR is located on chromosome 5 at 5p13.1 with a sequence length of 5440 bp, oriented on the minus strand. The translated RICTOR protein contains 1709 amino acids and is present in the cytosol. RICTOR contains few conserved regions and function domains of RICTOR have yet to be observed. However, using liquid chromatography-tandem mass spectrometry analysis, 21 phosphorylation sites were identified on RICTOR. Of these sites, T1135 has been shown to undergo growth factor-responsive phosphorylation via S6K1.

== Function ==
RICTOR is a subunit of the mammalian target of rapamycin complex 2 (mTORC2) which contains mTOR, GβL, RICTOR (this protein) and mSIN1.

The mammalian target of rapamycin (mTOR) is a highly conserved Ser/Thr kinase that regulates cell growth and proliferation.

mTOR may exist as mTOR complex 1 (mTORC1) or mTOR complex 2 (mTORC2). RICTOR is a key component of mTORC2, which, unlike mTORC1, is not directly inhibited by rapamycin. mTORC2, and RICTOR, specifically, has been shown to phosphorylate Akt/protein kinase B (PKB) on SER473. This phosphorylation activates Akt/PKB, where deregulation of Akt/PKB has been implicated in cancer and diabetes.

RICTOR and mTORC2 have been shown to play an essential role in embryonic growth and development, perhaps due to the control that mTORC2 exerts on actin cytoskeleton organization.

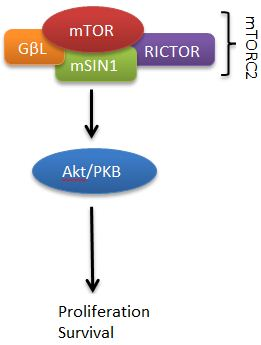
RICTOR is a subunit of the mTORC2 complex, which activates Akt/PKB signaling, leading to cell proliferation and survival.

=== Regulation ===
FoxO transcription factors can activate expression of RICTOR. FoxO has been shown to inhibit mTORC1, while activating Akt through RICTOR elevation.

=== Degradation ===
Perifosine has been shown to interfere with mTOR activity by degrading its components, such as RICTOR.

== Interactions ==
RICTOR has been shown to interact with and play a role in:

* KIAA1303,	* MTOR
*EGFR	*Fibroblast growth factor
*Nerve growth factor receptor	*Peptidyl-tyrosine phosphorylation
*TOR	*Protein kinase B
*Phosphoinositide-mediated signaling	*T cell costimulation
*Cell migration	*actin cytoskeleton organization

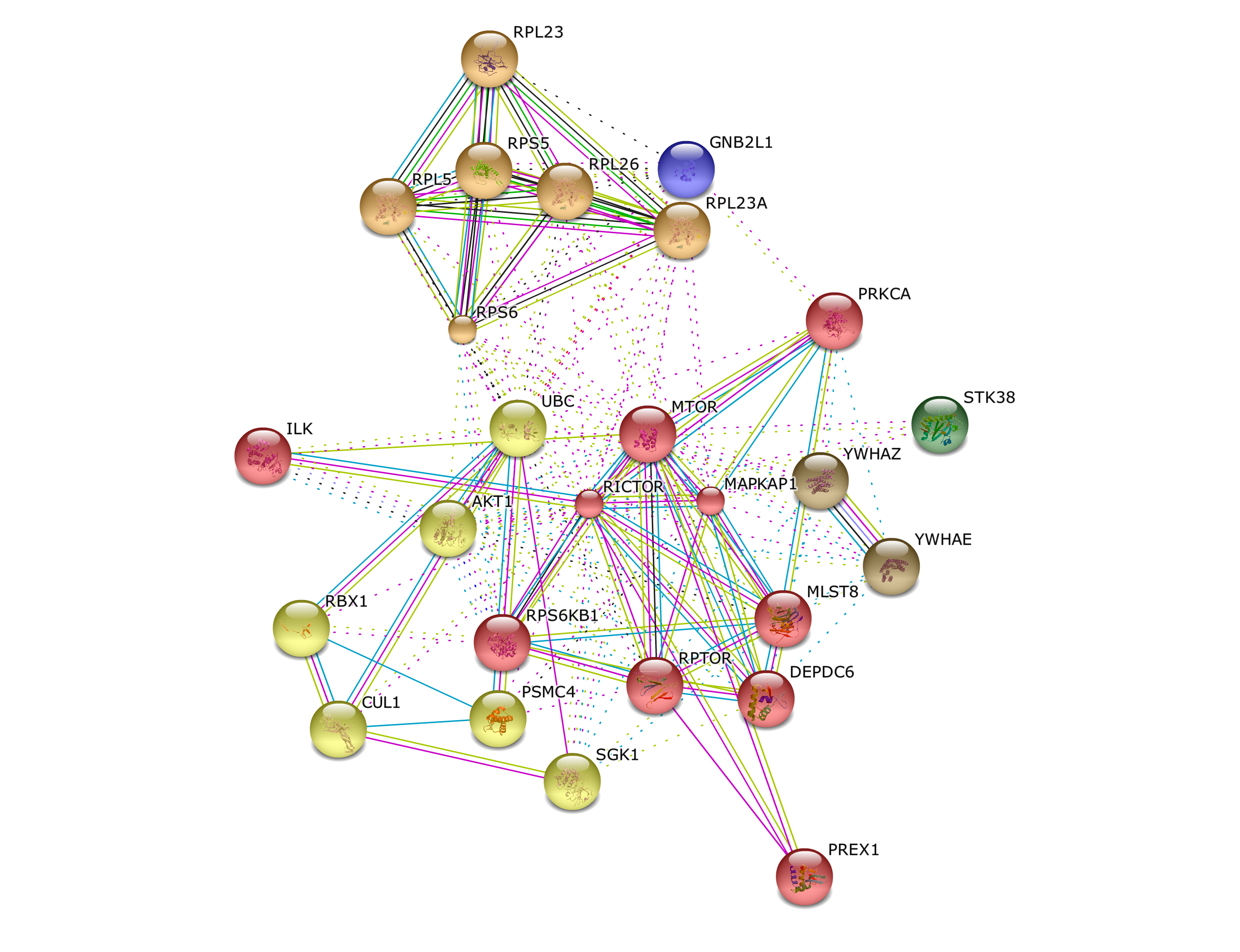
Strings represent evidence for the interaction of RICTOR with other proteins (other bubbles)

== Clinical relevance ==
Diseases associated with mutation in the RICTOR gene include foramen magnum meningioma and syringomyelia. Akt/PMB activation is also involved in glucose metabolism and activation of Akt by RICTOR has been shown to mediate glucose and lipid metabolism. Therefore, the influence of RICTOR and mTORC2 on Akt signaling has been associated with insulin resistance and type 2 diabetes.

=== Cancer ===
Akt/PMB activation leads to proliferation and survival, therefore over-activation of the Akt/PMB pathway by mTORC2 (including RICTOR) is implicated in cancerous growth.

In human colorectal carcinoma, RICTOR has been shown to association with FBXW7 (outside of mTORC2) to mediate the ubiquitination of growth-promoting factors cyclin E and c-Myc. Furthermore, elevated growth factor signaling may suppress the ubiquitinating action of RICTOR-FBXW7, resulting in accumulation of cyclin E and c-Myc and subsequent progression through the cell cycle.

In glioblastoma (GBM), RICTOR(along with EGFR) may serve as an effective therapeutic target for silencing RNA, leading to decreased cell proliferation. Co-silencing of RICTOR and EGFR lead to increased sensitivity to alkaloids and alkylating agents. For one particular PTEN-mutant cell line, co-silencing resulted in tumor eradication.

RICTOR has been shown to be significantly overexpressed in well-differentiated leiomyosarcomas. Due to the influence of RICTOR on actin polymerization, RICTOR could play a role in allowing transcription and subsequent differentiation in these muscle cells.

mTOR subunits RICTOR and RAPTOR both showed increased expression, which increased with pituitary adenoma tumor staging. Therefore, mTOR, RPTOR and RICTOR were significantly correlated with the growth and invasion of pituitary adenomas and may have an important predictive and prognostic value in such patients.

== See also ==
- RPTOR
- mTORC2
