= RpsF leader RNA =

RpsF leader is a conserved RNA structure, widely distributed to many bacterial species. It precedes the operon containing rpsF and rpsR, which encode ribosomal protein S6 and ribosomal protein S18, respectively. The RNA was shown to interact with S6:S18 protein dimer in vitro. It was shown that RpsF leader regulates gene expression in response to the S6:S18 complex, contributing to the regulation of ribosomal protein levels.
