= P70-S6 Kinase 1 =

Protein-coding gene in the species Homo sapiens

RPS6KB1
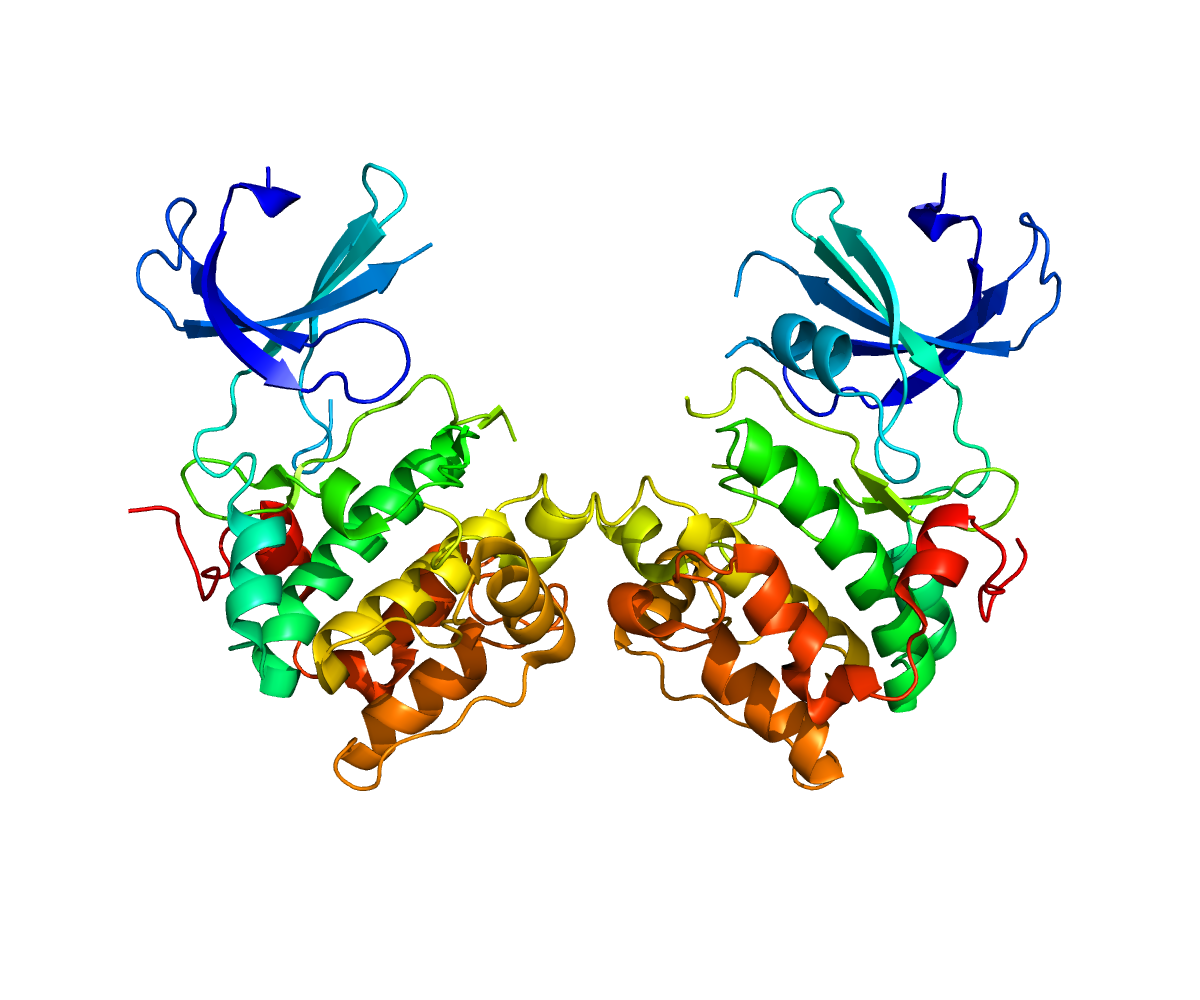

Identifiers
- Aliases: RPS6KB1, PS6K, S6K, S6K-beta-1, S6K1, STK14A, p70 S6KA, p70(S6K)-alpha, p70-S6K, p70-alpha, P70-S6 Kinase 1, ribosomal protein S6 kinase B1, p70S6K, p70S6 kinase
- External IDs: OMIM: 608938; MGI: 1270849; GeneCards: RPS6KB1
Available structures
PDB	Ortholog search: PDBe RCSB
PDB	List of PDB id codes 3A60, 3A61, 3A62, 3WE4, 3WF5, 3WF6, 3WF7, 3WF8, 3WF9, 4L3J, 4L3L, 4L42, 4L43, 4L44, 4L45, 4L46, 4RLO, 4RLP
Enzyme activity
EC #	BRENDA	ExPASy	KEGG	MetaCyc
2.7.11.1	↗	↗	↗	↗

Gene location (Human)
Chr.	Chromosome 17 (human)
Band	17q23.1	Start	59,893,046 bp
Band	17q23.1	End	59,950,574 bp

Gene location (Mouse)
Chr.	Chromosome 11 (mouse)
Band	11|11 C	Start	86,498,871 bp
Band	11|11 C	End	86,544,805 bp
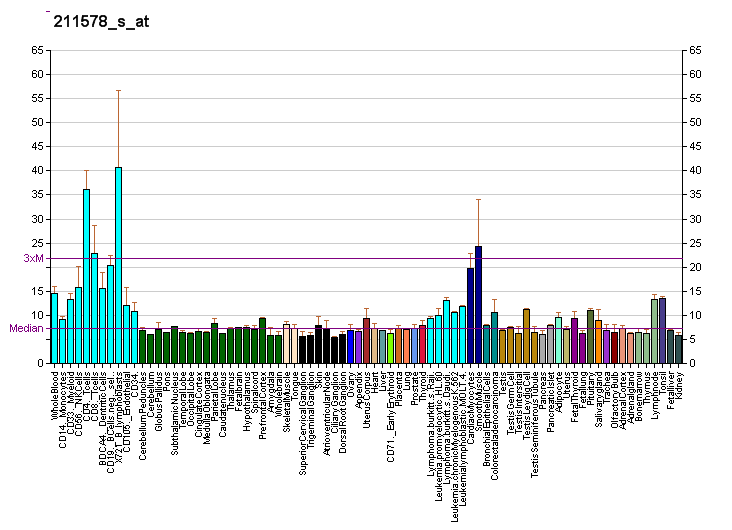

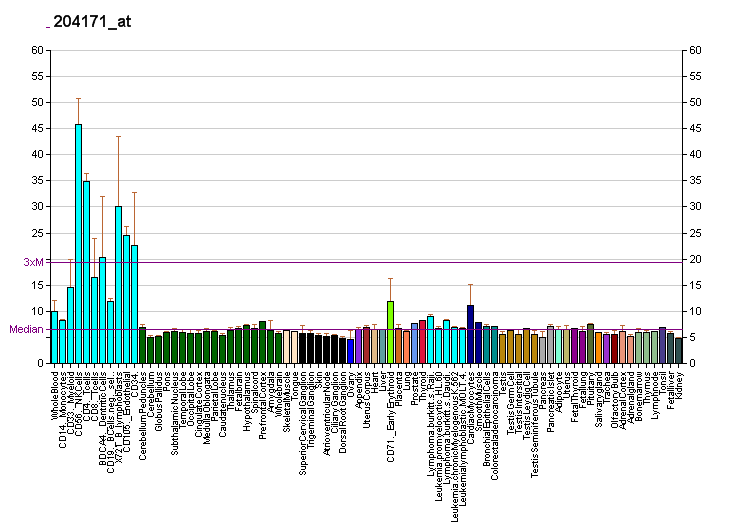
RNA expression pattern
Bgee	Human / Mouse (ortholog); Top expressed in: endothelial cell; Brodmann area 23; Achilles tendon; middle temporal gyrus; tibia; epithelium of colon; gingival epithelium; biceps brachii; Skeletal muscle tissue of biceps brachii; Skeletal muscle tissue of rectus abdominis / Top expressed in: lacrimal gland; tail of embryo; Paneth cell; genital tubercle; renal corpuscle; ureter; condyle; fossa; substantia nigra; migratory enteric neural crest cell; More reference expression data
BioGPS	More reference expression data
Gene ontology
Molecular function	transferase activity; protein kinase activity; nucleotide binding; peptide binding; protein binding; identical protein binding; protein serine/threonine/tyrosine kinase activity; ATP binding; kinase activity; protein serine/threonine kinase activity; ribosomal protein S6 kinase activity; PDZ domain binding; protein phosphatase 2A binding
Cellular component	cytoplasm; cytosol; membrane; synapse; nucleoplasm; cell surface; mitochondrial outer membrane; cell junction; mitochondrion; perinuclear region of cytoplasm; neuron projection; nucleus
Biological process	germ cell development; response to amino acid; response to glucagon; response to organic cyclic compound; protein kinase B signaling; response to nutrient; phosphorylation; regulation of glucose import; response to testosterone; negative regulation of extrinsic apoptotic signaling pathway; cellular response to growth factor stimulus; skeletal muscle contraction; response to mechanical stimulus; ageing; response to leucine; cellular response to organic cyclic compound; positive regulation of mitotic cell cycle; negative regulation of apoptotic process; response to heat; response to glucocorticoid; response to glucose; response to peptide hormone; behavioral fear response; positive regulation of translation; response to organic substance; positive regulation of smooth muscle cell migration; response to tumor necrosis factor; response to insulin; response to lipopolysaccharide; negative regulation of insulin receptor signaling pathway; cellular response to hormone stimulus; long-term memory; response to wounding; response to organonitrogen compound; response to electrical stimulus involved in regulation of muscle adaptation; skeletal muscle atrophy; cell cycle; response to ethanol; positive regulation of translational initiation; cell migration; response to toxic substance; positive regulation of skeletal muscle tissue growth; regulation of translation; phosphatidylinositol-mediated signaling; signal transduction; positive regulation of smooth muscle cell proliferation; apoptotic process; protein phosphorylation; cellular response to dexamethasone stimulus; cellular response to insulin stimulus; G1/S transition of mitotic cell cycle; peptidyl-serine phosphorylation; TOR signaling; cellular response to interferon-gamma; long-chain fatty acid import into cell; intracellular signal transduction; response to nutrient levels
Sources:Amigo / QuickGO
Orthologs
Databases	NCBI: entry; OMA: entry
Species	Human	Mouse
Entrez	6198	72508
Ensembl	ENSG00000108443	ENSMUSG00000020516
UniProt	P23443	Q8BSK8
RefSeq (mRNA)	NM_001272042; NM_001272043; NM_001272044; NM_001272060; NM_003161	NM_001114334; NM_028259; NM_001363162
RefSeq (protein)	NP_001258971; NP_001258972; NP_001258973; NP_001258989; NP_003152 NP_001356598; NP_001356599; NP_001356600; NP_001356601; NP_001356602; NP_001356603; NP_001356604; NP_001356605; NP_001356606; NP_001356607; NP_001356608	NP_001107806; NP_082535; NP_001350091
Location (UCSC)	Chr 17: 59.89 – 59.95 Mb	Chr 11: 86.5 – 86.54 Mb
PubMed search
- Wikidata
View/Edit Human	View/Edit Mouse

Ribosomal protein S6 kinase beta-1 (S6K1), also known as p70S6 kinase (p70S6K, p70-S6K), is an enzyme (specifically, a protein kinase) that in humans is encoded by the RPS6KB1 gene. It is a serine/threonine kinase that acts downstream of PIP3 and phosphoinositide-dependent kinase-1 in the PI3 kinase pathway. As the name suggests, its target substrate is the S6 ribosomal protein. Phosphorylation of S6 induces protein synthesis at the ribosome.

The phosphorylation of p70S6K at threonine 389 has been used as a hallmark of activation by mTOR and correlated with autophagy inhibition in various situations. However, several recent studies suggest that the activity of p70S6K plays a more positive role in the increase of autophagy.

== Function ==
This gene encodes a member of the S6K family of serine/threonine kinases, which phosphorylate several residues of the S6 ribosomal protein. The kinase activity of this protein leads to an increase in protein synthesis and cell proliferation. Amplification of the region of DNA encoding this gene and overexpression of this kinase are seen in some breast cancer cell lines. Alternate translational start sites have been described and alternate transcriptional splice variants have been observed but have not been thoroughly characterized.

=== mTOR ===
The p70S6 kinase is a downstream target of mTOR (mammalian target of rapamycin) signaling, specifically mTORC1, an mTOR-containing complex characterized by the inclusion of Raptor rather than Rictor (mTORC2). mTOR can be activated via an AND-gate-like mechanism at the lysosome, integrating signals about growth factors and bioavailability of important molecules. For instance, amino acids such as arginine and leucine can trigger lysosomal recruitment of mTORC1. Once at the lysosome, mTOR can be activated by Rheb, a small, lysosomal-resident GTPase, in its GTP-bound state. Rheb GTPase activity is stimulated (and therefore capacity to activate mTOR diminished) by the upstream TSC complex, which is inhibited by IGF signalling. Thus, the AND gate consists of proper localization by sufficiency of amino acids and activation by growth factors. Once mTOR has been properly localized and activated, it can phosphorylate downstream targets such as p70S6K, 4EBP, and ULK1 which are important for regulating protein anabolic/catabolic balance.

Physical exercise activates protein synthesis via phosphorylation (activation) of p70S6K in a pathway that is dependent on mTOR, specifically mTORC1. This has been demonstrated by using an inhibitor of mTOR, rapamycin, to block an increase in muscle mass, despite increases in load (e.g., exercise). Exercise has been shown to increase levels of IGF-1 in muscle, thus inducing the IGF-1/PI3K/Akt/p70S6K signaling pathway, and thereby increasing the protein synthesis that is required to build muscle.

== Clinical significance ==
Inhibition of the S6K1 protein, or a lack of it, slows the production of adipose (fat) cells by disrupting and retarding the initial "commitment stage" of their formation. The study could have implications for the treatment of obesity.

Amplification of the region of DNA encoding this gene and overexpression of this kinase are seen in some breast cancer cell lines.

Another pathway for which P70 has proposed involvement is in muscle lengthening and growing. P70 is phosphorylated by passive stretch in the soleus muscle. This may be one of many protein kinases involved in muscle building.

In its inactive state, S6K1 is bound to eIF3 and detaches following phosphorylation by mTOR/Raptor. Free S6K1 is then able to phosphorylate a number of its targets, including eIF4B.

== Interactions ==
P70-S6 Kinase 1 has been shown to interact with:

- COASY,
- CSNK2B,
- EIF3B,
- KIAA1303,
- MTOR,
- POLDIP3,
- PPP2R2A,
- RBX1, and
- UBC.

== See also ==
- Ribosomal S6 kinase
- RPS6KA1
