= MID2 =

Protein-coding gene in humans

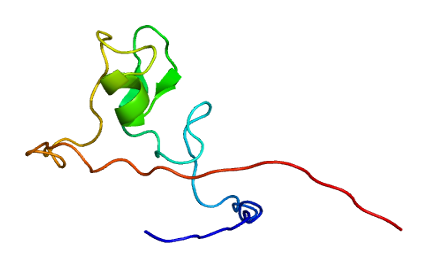

Identifiers
- Aliases: MID2, FXY2, MRX101, RNF60, TRIM1, midline 2, XLID101
- External IDs: OMIM: 300204; MGI: 1344333; GeneCards: MID2
Available structures
PDB	Ortholog search: PDBe RCSB
PDB	List of PDB id codes 2DJA, 2DMK
Enzyme activity
EC #	BRENDA	ExPASy	KEGG	MetaCyc
2.3.2.27	↗	↗	↗	↗

Gene location (Human)
Chr.	X chromosome (human)
Band	Xq22.3	Start	107,825,755 bp
Band	Xq22.3	End	107,931,637 bp

Gene location (Mouse)
Chr.	X chromosome (mouse)
Band	X F1|X 61.35 cM	Start	139,565,348 bp
Band	X F1|X 61.35 cM	End	139,668,464 bp
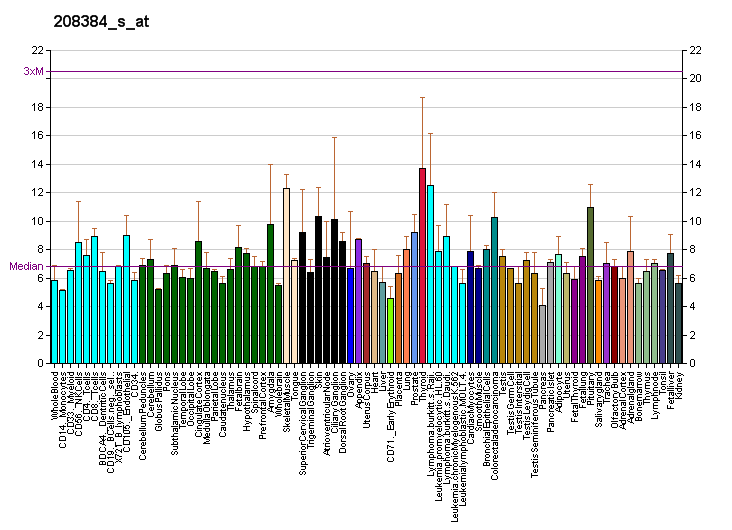
RNA expression pattern
Bgee	Human / Mouse (ortholog); Top expressed in: tibialis anterior muscle; islet of Langerhans; cartilage tissue; muscle of thigh; smooth muscle tissue; gastrocnemius muscle; skin of thigh; pancreatic ductal cell; popliteal artery; tibial arteries / Top expressed in: lateral nasal prominence; medial nasal prominence; left lung lobe; supraoptic nucleus; female urethra; superior frontal gyrus; dentate gyrus of hippocampal formation granule cell; genital tubercle; ascending aorta; cerebellar cortex; More reference expression data
BioGPS	More reference expression data
Gene ontology
Molecular function	protein homodimerization activity; microtubule binding; zinc ion binding; metal ion binding; phosphoprotein binding; protein binding; protein heterodimerization activity; identical protein binding; transferase activity
Cellular component	cytoplasm; intracellular anatomical structure; microtubule; extracellular exosome; cytoskeleton
Biological process	positive regulation of autophagy; positive regulation of DNA-binding transcription factor activity; protein localization to microtubule; positive regulation of NF-kappaB transcription factor activity; protein ubiquitination; positive regulation of I-kappaB kinase/NF-kappaB signaling; innate immune response; negative regulation of viral transcription; negative regulation of viral entry into host cell
Sources:Amigo / QuickGO
Orthologs
Databases	NCBI: entry; OMA: entry
Species	Human	Mouse
Entrez	11043	23947
Ensembl	ENSG00000080561	ENSMUSG00000000266
UniProt	Q9UJV3	Q9QUS6
RefSeq (mRNA)	NM_012216; NM_052817; NM_001382751; NM_001382752	NM_011845; NM_001358366; NM_001358367
RefSeq (protein)	NP_036348; NP_438112; NP_001369680; NP_001369681	NP_035975; NP_001345295; NP_001345296; NP_001390295
Location (UCSC)	Chr X: 107.83 – 107.93 Mb	Chr X: 139.57 – 139.67 Mb
PubMed search
- Wikidata
View/Edit Human	View/Edit Mouse

Midline-2 is a protein that in humans is encoded by the MID2 gene.

== Function ==
The protein encoded by this gene is a member of the tripartite motif (TRIM) family. The TRIM motif includes three zinc-binding domains, a RING, a B-box type 1 and a B-box type 2, and a coiled-coil region. The protein localizes to microtubular structures in the cytoplasm. Its function has not been identified. Alternate splicing of this gene results in two transcript variants encoding different isoforms.

Recent reports indicate the involvement of MID2 in cytokinesis.MID2 (TRIM1) ubiquitinates Sperm-associated antigen 5 (Astrin) on K409, further promoting its degradation and proper cytokinesis. In contrary, depletion of MID2 (TRIM1) stabilizes Sperm-associated antigen 5 (Astrin) whose inappropriate accumulation at the midbody triggers cytokinetic arrest, multinucleated cells, and cell death.

== Interactions ==
MID2 has been shown to interact with MID1.

MID2 (TRIM1) interacts with Leucine-rich repeat kinase 2 (LRRK2), which is often subject to missense mutations in familial Parkinson's disease (PD). MID2 (TRIM1) specifically binds to the flexible regulatory loop of LRRK2_{853–981}. MID2 (TRIM1) recruits LRRK2 to the microtubule cytoskeleton where MID2 (TRIM1) ubiquitinates LRRK2 targeting it for proteasomal degradation.
