= Torin-1 =

Chemical compound

Torin_1
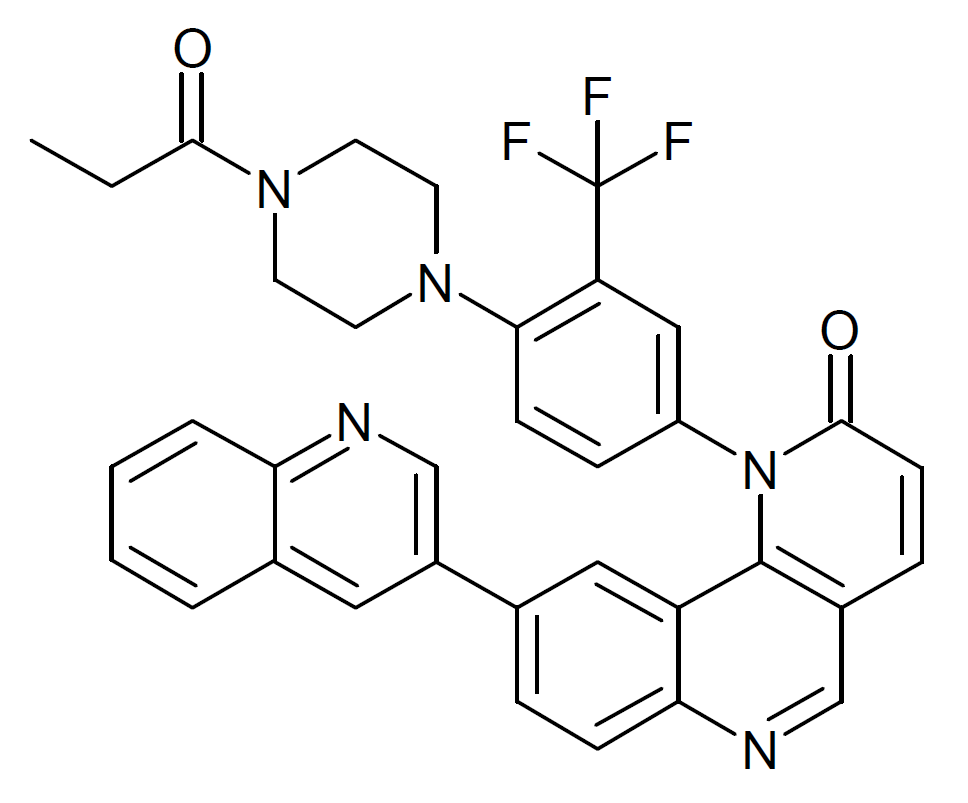

Identifiers
- IUPAC name: 1-[4-(4-propanoylpiperazin-1-yl)-3-(trifluoromethyl)phenyl]-9-quinolin-3-ylbenzo[h][1,6]naphthyridin-2-one
- CAS Number: 1222998-36-8
- PubChem CID: 49836027
- ChemSpider: 26232175
- UNII: K9HTV88VQZ
- ChEBI: CHEBI:84327
- ChEMBL: ChEMBL1256459
- CompTox Dashboard (EPA): DTXSID40678621

Chemical and physical data
- Formula: C_{35}H_{28}F_{3}N_{5}O_{2}
- Molar mass: 607.637 g·mol^{−1}
- 3D model (JSmol): Interactive image
- SMILES: CCC(=O)N1CCN(CC1)C2=C(C=C(C=C2)N3C(=O)C=CC4=CN=C5C=CC(=CC5=C43)C6=CC7=CC=CC=C7N=C6)C(F)(F)F
- InChI: InChI=1S/C35H28F3N5O2/c1-2-32(44)42-15-13-41(14-16-42)31-11-9-26(19-28(31)35(36,37)38)43-33(45)12-8-24-20-40-30-10-7-22(18-27(30)34(24)43)25-17-23-5-3-4-6-29(23)39-21-25/h3-12,17-21H,2,13-16H2,1H3; Key:AKCRNFFTGXBONI-UHFFFAOYSA-N

Torin_1 is a drug which was one of the first non-rapalog derived inhibitors of the mechanistic target of rapamycin (mTOR) subtypes mTORC1 and mTORC2. In animal studies it has anti-inflammatory, anti-cancer, and anti-aging properties, and shows activity against neuropathic pain.
