= N2a cell =

N2a cells (also known as Neuro2a cells) are a fast-growing mouse neuroblastoma cell line.

== Differentiation properties ==
Originating from a mouse, the N2a cell line has a neuronal and amoeboid stem cell morphology, allowing it to differentiate in response to environmental factors. The differentiated cells have many properties of neurons, including neurofilaments. The differentiation of N2a cells is caused by activation of the mitogen-activated protein kinase/extracellular-signal regulated kinase (MAPK/ERK) and the phosphoinositide-3-kinase/protein kinase B (PI3K/Akt) signaling pathways. The cells, due to passaging since initial collection, can exhibit responses to toxins that differ from those of neuronal cells in a live organism. Synthesizing large amounts of microtubules, N2a cells are susceptible to viruses (such as herpes simplex and poliovirus) that can alter cell morphology and physiology.

=== Factors that Affect Differentiation of N2a Cells ===
==== Promoting Factors ====
- Emodin causes N2a differentiation and growth through activation of the PI3K/Akt pathway. It does so by activating Akt while inactivating glycogen synthase kinase-3β (GSK-3β), an inhibitor of the Akt pathway. Emodin specifically causes phosphorylation of cAMP-responsive element binding protein (CREB), an important molecule in the differentiation of neurons.
- β-Hydroxy-β-methylbutyrate (HMB) causes N2a growth through activation and phosphorylation of the PI3K/Akt and MAPK/ERK signaling pathways. HMB causes activation of mTOR, which is regulated by the Atk pathway, and expression of glucose transporters in N2a cells, leading to differentiation. It also increases the activity of MEF2, mainly MEF2C, in N2a cells.
- α-lipoic acid (LA) mainly causes N2a differentiation through phosphorylation of the ERK pathway and the Akt pathway. Inhibition of only the ERK pathway will prevent LA-induced differentiation from occurring, while inhibition of the Akt pathway will not prevent LA-induced differentiation. LA causes differentiation through the production of reactive oxygen species which activate the ERK pathway.

==== Inhibitory Factors ====
- High density lipoproteins (HDL) inhibit differentiation of N2a cells that are differentiated through serum-withdrawal differentiation. HDL does so through inhibiting the function of epidermal growth factor receptor (EGFR) by preventing EGFR phosphorylation. This prevents EGFR from causing activation of the Akt and ERK pathways.
- Avermectin (AVM) derivatives abamectin (ABM) and doramectin (DOM) inhibit N2a differentiation by suppressing P-glycoprotein (P-gp) in N2a cells, a major contributor to N2a cell differentiation.

== Research applications ==
N2a cells are able to rapidly, reliably, and easily differentiate, making them effective for use in research applications relating to neurons and neuronal disorders. Serum withdrawal is a common method of inducing differentiation of N2a cells, involving removal of the serum that the cells are grown in to activate the signaling pathways governing differentiation. N2a cells have been used to study neurite outgrowth, neurotoxicity, Alzheimer's disease, asymmetric division of mammalian cell lines, adenoviral transduction, and the diagnosing of rabies. One specific research applications is the differentiation of N2a cells into dopamine neurons for potential use in treating Parkinson's Disease.
