= EIF4EBP1 =

Protein-coding gene in the species Homo sapiens

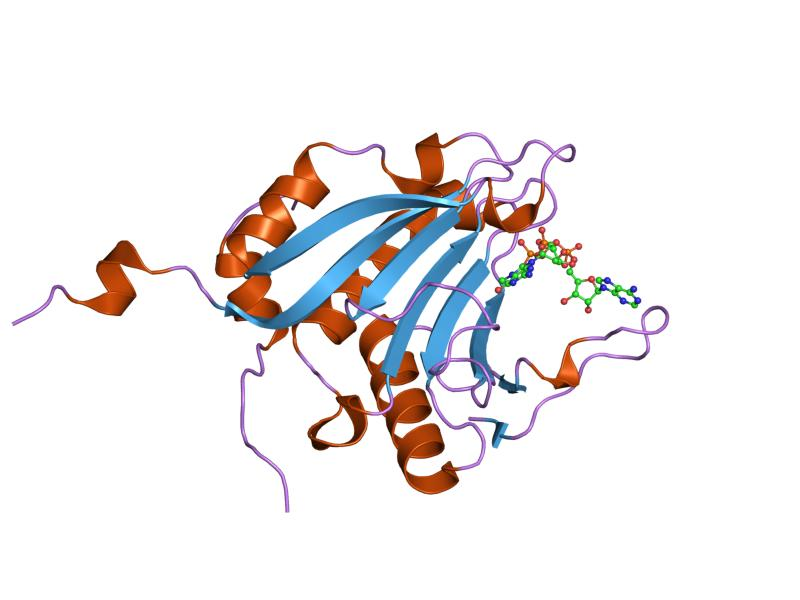
Available structures
| PDB | Ortholog search: PDBe RCSB |
| PDB | List of PDB id codes 1EJ4, 1WKW, 2JGB, 2JGC, 2V8W, 2V8X, 2V8Y, 3HXG, 3HXI, 3M93, 3M94, 3U7X, 4UED, 5BXV |

Identifiers
- Aliases: EIF4EBP1, 4E-BP1, 4EBP1, BP-1, PHAS-I, eukaryotic translation initiation factor 4E binding protein 1
- External IDs: OMIM: 602223; MGI: 103267; HomoloGene: 3021; GeneCards: EIF4EBP1; OMA:EIF4EBP1 - orthologs

Gene location (Human)
| Chr. | Chromosome 8 (human) |
| Band | 8p11.23 | Start | 38,030,534 bp |
| Band | 8p11.23 | End | 38,060,365 bp |

Gene location (Mouse)
| Chr. | Chromosome 8 (mouse) |
| Band | 8 A2|8 15.95 cM | Start | 27,750,357 bp |
| Band | 8 A2|8 15.95 cM | End | 27,766,702 bp |
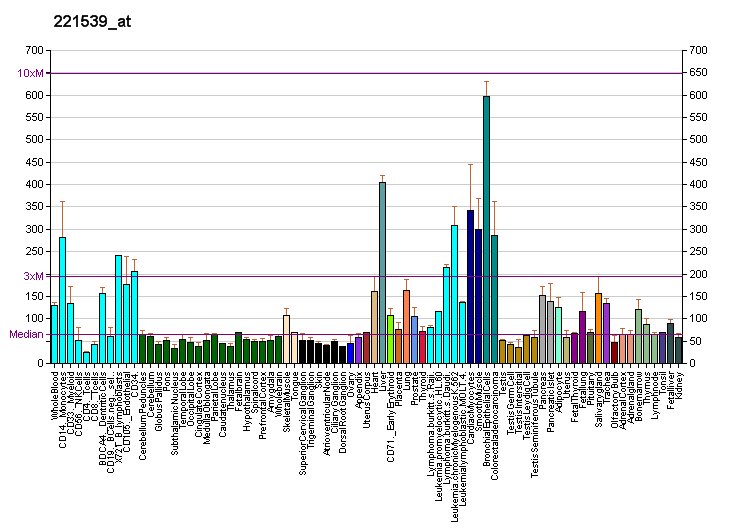
RNA expression pattern
| Bgee | Human / Mouse (ortholog); Top expressed in: body of pancreas; parotid gland; muscle of thigh; gastrocnemius muscle; apex of heart; minor salivary glands; olfactory zone of nasal mucosa; right lobe of liver; stromal cell of endometrium; cartilage tissue / Top expressed in: parotid gland; endothelial cell of lymphatic vessel; lacrimal gland; white adipose tissue; brown adipose tissue; muscle of thigh; embryo; granulocyte; gastrula; submandibular gland; More reference expression data |
| BioGPS | More reference expression data |
Gene ontology
| Molecular function | translation repressor activity; protein binding; eukaryotic initiation factor 4E binding; translation initiation factor binding; protein phosphatase 2A binding |
| Cellular component | cytosol; cytoplasm; nucleus; protein-containing complex; glutamatergic synapse; postsynaptic cytosol |
| Biological process | negative regulation of translation; negative regulation of translational initiation; positive regulation of mitotic cell cycle; TOR signaling; IRES-dependent translational initiation of linear mRNA; regulation of translation; insulin receptor signaling pathway; cellular response to dexamethasone stimulus; G1/S transition of mitotic cell cycle; response to ischemia; lung development; negative regulation of protein-containing complex assembly; response to ethanol; cellular response to hypoxia; response to amino acid starvation |
Sources:Amigo / QuickGO
Orthologs
| Species | Human | Mouse |
| Entrez | 1978 | 13685 |
| Ensembl | ENSG00000187840 | ENSMUSG00000031490 |
| UniProt | Q13541 | Q60876 |
| RefSeq (mRNA) | NM_004095 | NM_007918 |
| RefSeq (protein) | NP_004086 | NP_031944 |
| Location (UCSC) | Chr 8: 38.03 – 38.06 Mb | Chr 8: 27.75 – 27.77 Mb |
| PubMed search |
- Wikidata
| View/Edit Human | View/Edit Mouse |

Eukaryotic translation initiation factor 4E-binding protein 1 (also known as 4E-BP1) is a protein that in humans is encoded by the EIF4EBP1 gene. It inhibits cap-dependent translation by binding to translation initiation factor eIF4E. Phosphorylation of 4E-BP1 results in its release from eIF4E, thereby allows cap-dependent translation to continue thereby increasing the rate of protein synthesis.

== Phosphorylation ==
Phosphorylated 4E-BP1 is thought to be a marker of upstream signaling (mTOR) activation. 4E-BP1 has seven phospho-sites, the three most important of which are the initiation site Thr 37/Thr 46, the second site Thr 70, and the final site Ser65. Moreover, phosphorylation of Ser 65 and Thr 70 alone was not sufficient to block the inhibition of mRNA translation by 4E-BP1, suggesting that multiple phosphorylation events must be combined to increase the rate of protein synthesis.

== Function ==
This gene encodes one member of a family of translation repressor proteins. The protein directly interacts with eukaryotic translation initiation factor 4E (eIF4E), which is a limiting component of the multisubunit complex that recruits 40S ribosomal subunits to the 5' end of mRNAs. Interaction of this protein with eIF4E inhibits complex assembly and represses translation. This protein is phosphorylated in response to various signals including UV irradiation and insulin signaling, resulting in its dissociation from eIF4E and activation of cap-dependent mRNA translation.

High level of phosphorylated 4E-BP1 has been widely reported in human cancers, and is associated with a worse outcome in several malignancies.

== Interactions ==
EIF4EBP1 has been shown to interact with:

- EIF4E,
- KIAA1303, and
- Mammalian target of rapamycin (mTOR).
