= Smith–Kingsmore syndrome =

- Other names: SKS, Macrocephaly-intellectual disability-neurodevelopmental disorder-small thorax syndrome, MINDS syndrome
- Smith–Kingsmore syndrome is inherited in autosomal dominant fashion
- Symptoms: Intellectual disability, macrocephaly
- Causes: Gain-of-function mutation in MTOR
- Diagnostic method: Genetic testing

Smith–Kingsmore syndrome is a rare genetic disorder that is caused by a gain-of-function mutation in a mTOR gene. The facial features of this syndrome are triangular face with a pointed chin, frontal bossing, hypertelorism, eyes with downslanting palpebral fissures, a flat nasal bridge, a long philtrum.

== Presentation ==
The signs of this disease are:

Very frequent:

- Intellectual disability
- Macrocephaly

Frequent:

- Abnormal facial shape
- Abnormality of speech
- Curly hair
- Seizure
- Frontal bossing
- Ventriculomegaly

Occasional:

- Autistic Behaviour
- Cafe-au-lait spot
- Gait Disturbance
- Hypertelorism
- Hypotonia
- Open mouth
- Long philtrum
- Polymicrogyria
- Prominient forehead

Very rare:

- Downslanted palpebral fissures
- Depressed nasal bridge
- Decreased circulating IgA level

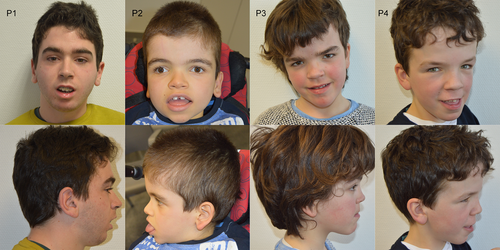
Four patients showing characteristic facial signs of Smith–Kingsmore syndrome

== Cause ==
The cause of SKS is gain-of-function mutation in a gene MTOR.

This disease is inherited in autosomal dominant fashion, but most of the times it is de-novo mutation.

== Diagnosis ==
SKS is a rare condition so many physicians aren't familiar with. A diagnosis of SKS is suspected based upon the identification of symptoms, a patient and family history and a thorough clinical evaluation.

SKS can be confirmed with the detection of a germline or mosaic mutation in the MTOR gene.

== Frequency ==
Frequency of this disease is unknown, but all ethnic groups are equally affected.

== Treatment ==
There is no cure for SKS, but management of some symptoms can be achieved.

== History ==
SKS was first described by Dr Smith, L.D et al. in 2013.
