= POLDIP3 =

Protein-coding gene in the species Homo sapiens

Identifiers
- Aliases: POLDIP3, PDIP46, SKAR, polymerase (DNA) delta interacting protein 3, DNA polymerase delta interacting protein 3, PDIP3
- External IDs: OMIM: 611520; MGI: 1921076; GeneCards: POLDIP3

Gene location (Human)
Chr.	Chromosome 22 (human)
Band	22q13.2	Start	42,583,721 bp
Band	22q13.2	End	42,614,962 bp

Gene location (Mouse)
Chr.	Chromosome 15 (mouse)
Band	15|15 E1	Start	83,010,177 bp
Band	15|15 E1	End	83,033,585 bp
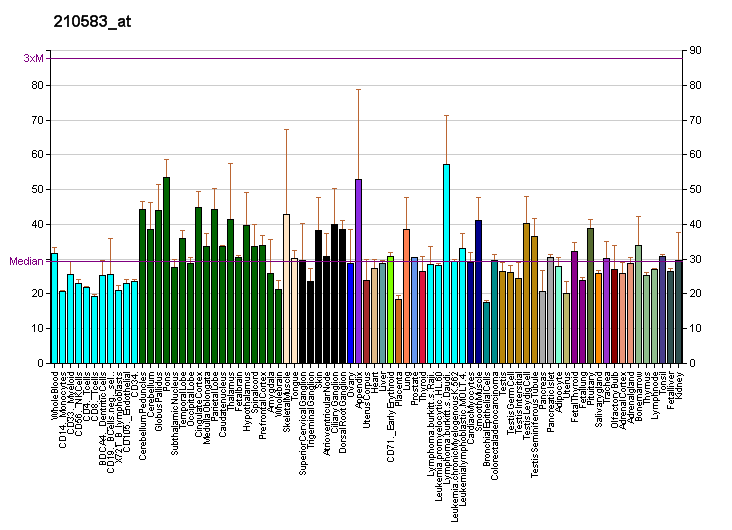

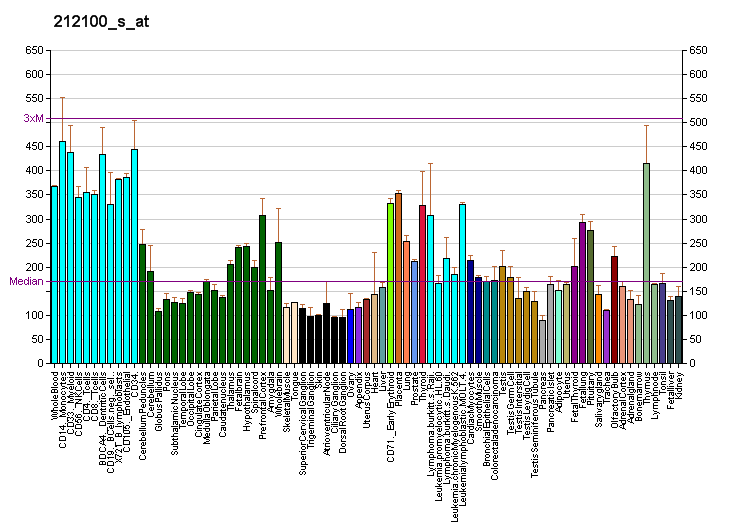

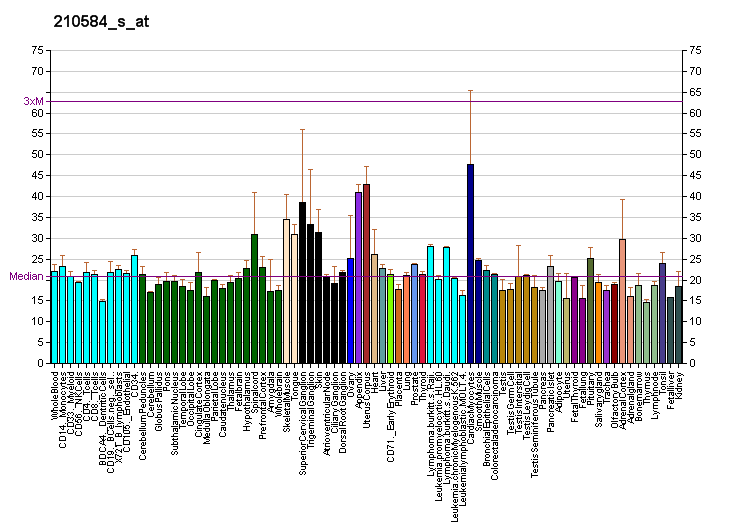
RNA expression pattern
Bgee	Human / Mouse (ortholog); Top expressed in: ventricular zone; ganglionic eminence; left ovary; oocyte; right ovary; granulocyte; right uterine tube; islet of Langerhans; cardia; body of uterus / Top expressed in: internal carotid artery; external carotid artery; motor neuron; condyle; Rostral migratory stream; fossa; medial ganglionic eminence; ascending aorta; aortic valve; vestibular membrane of cochlear duct; More reference expression data
BioGPS	More reference expression data
Gene ontology
Molecular function	protein binding; nucleic acid binding; RNA binding; protein-containing complex binding
Cellular component	exon-exon junction complex; transcription export complex; nucleus; nuclear speck; cytoplasm; cytosol; nucleoplasm; cytoplasmic ribonucleoprotein granule
Biological process	poly(A)+ mRNA export from nucleus; mRNA transport; regulation of translation; positive regulation of translation; termination of RNA polymerase II transcription; mRNA 3'-end processing; RNA export from nucleus; mRNA export from nucleus; transport
Sources:Amigo / QuickGO
Orthologs
Databases	NCBI: entry; OMA: entry
Species	Human	Mouse
Entrez	84271	73826
Ensembl	ENSG00000100227	ENSMUSG00000041815
UniProt	Q9BY77; Q8WUT1	Q8BG81
RefSeq (mRNA)	NM_001278657; NM_032311; NM_178136; NM_001363052	NM_178627; NM_001347082
RefSeq (protein)	NP_001265586; NP_115687; NP_835237; NP_001349981	NP_001334011; NP_848742
Location (UCSC)	Chr 22: 42.58 – 42.61 Mb	Chr 15: 83.01 – 83.03 Mb
PubMed search
- Wikidata
View/Edit Human	View/Edit Mouse

Polymerase delta-interacting protein 3 is an enzyme that in humans is encoded by the POLDIP3 gene.

This gene encodes a protein that interacts with the DNA polymerase delta p50 subunit. This protein is a specific target of S6 kinase 1 and regulates cell growth. Two transcript variants that encode different protein isoforms have been identified.

== Interactions ==
POLDIP3 has been shown to interact with P70-S6 Kinase 1.
