= MTORC2 =

Protein complex

mTOR

Identifiers
- Symbol: MTOR
- Alt. symbols: FRAP, FRAP2, FRAP1
- NCBI gene: 2475
- HGNC: 3942
- OMIM: 601231
- RefSeq: NM_004958
- UniProt: P42345

Other data
- EC number: 2.7.11.1
- Locus: Chr. 1 p36
Search for
- Structures: Swiss-model
- Domains: InterPro

RICTOR

Identifiers
- Symbol: RICTOR
- NCBI gene: 253260
- HGNC: 28611
- RefSeq: NM_152756

Other data
- Locus: Chr. 5 p13.1

MLST8

Identifiers
- Symbol: MLST8
- NCBI gene: 64223
- HGNC: 24825
- OMIM: 612190
- RefSeq: NM_022372
- UniProt: Q9BVC4

Other data
- Locus: Chr. 16 p13.3
Search for
- Structures: Swiss-model
- Domains: InterPro

MAPKAP1

Identifiers
- Symbol: MAPKAP1
- NCBI gene: 79109
- HGNC: 18752
- OMIM: 610558
- RefSeq: NM_001006617.1
- UniProt: Q9BPZ7

Other data
- Locus: Chr. 9 q34.11
Search for
- Structures: Swiss-model
- Domains: InterPro

mTOR Complex 2 (mTORC2) is an acutely rapamycin-insensitive protein complex formed by serine/threonine kinase mTOR that regulates cell proliferation and survival, cell migration and cytoskeletal remodeling. The complex itself is rather large, consisting of seven protein subunits. The catalytic mTOR subunit, DEP domain containing mTOR-interacting protein (DEPTOR), mammalian lethal with sec-13 protein 8 (mLST8, also known as GβL), and TTI1/TEL2 complex are shared by both mTORC2 and mTORC1. Rapamycin-insensitive companion of mTOR (RICTOR), mammalian stress-activated protein kinase interacting protein 1 (mSIN1), and protein observed with rictor 1 and 2 (Protor1/2) can only be found in mTORC2. Rictor has been shown to be the scaffold protein for substrate binding to mTORC2.

== Function ==
Though less understood than mTORC1, mTORC2 has been shown to respond to growth factors and to modulate cell metabolism and cell survival, thanks to its activation of the survival kinase Akt. mTORC2 activation by growth factors is done through promotion of mTORC2-ribosome association in PI3K-dependent manner. The complex also plays a role as an important regulator in the organization of the actin cytoskeleton through its stimulation of F-actin stress fibers, paxillin, RhoA, Rac1, Cdc42, and protein kinase C α (PKCα).

mTORC2 also regulates cellular proliferation and metabolism, in part through the regulation of IGF-IR, InsR, Akt/PKB and the serum-and glucocorticoid-induced protein kinase SGK. mTORC2 phosphorylates the serine/threonine protein kinase Akt/PKB at a serine residue S473 as well as serine residue S450. Phosphorylation of the serine stimulates Akt phosphorylation at a threonine T308 residue by PDK1 and leads to full Akt activation. Curcumin inhibits both by preventing phosphorylation of the serine. Moreover, mTORC2 activity has been implicated in the regulation of autophagy(macroautophagy and chaperone-mediated autophagy). In addition, mTORC2 has tyrosine kinase activity and phosphorylates IGF-IR and insulin receptor at the tyrosine residues Y1131/1136 and Y1146/1151, respectively, leading to full activation of IGF-IR and InsR.

The precise localization of mTORC2 inside cells is still unclear. Some findings based on its activity point to cellular endomembranes, such as of mitochondria, as a possible site of mTORC2, whereas other suggest that the complex could be additionally located at the plasma membrane; however, this may be due to its association with Akt. It is not clear if these membranes display mTORC2 activity in the cellular context, or if these pools contribute to phosphorylation of mTORC2 substrates.

In neurons and neutrophils, mTORC2 facilitates actin polymerization. Mice with reduced mTORC2 have deficient synaptic plasticity and memory.

== Regulation and signaling ==
mTORC2 appears to be regulated by insulin, growth factors, and serum. In contrast to TORC1, which is mainly stimulated by nutrients, TORC2 is mainly stimulated by growth factors. Originally, mTORC2 was identified as a rapamycin-insensitive entity, as acute exposure to rapamycin did not affect mTORC2 activity or Akt phosphorylation. However, subsequent studies have shown that, at least in some cell lines, chronic exposure to rapamycin, while not affecting pre-existing mTORC2s, promotes rapamycin inhibition of free mTOR molecules, thus inhibiting the formation of new mTORC2. mTORC2 can be inhibited by chronic treatment with rapamycin in vivo, both in cancer cells and normal tissues such as the liver and adipose tissue. Torin-1 can also be used to inhibit mTORC2.

=== Upstream signaling ===
Similar to other PI3K regulated proteins, mTORC2 has a mSin1 subunit, which contains a phosphoinositide-binding PH domain. This domain is vital for the insulin-dependent regulation of mTORC2 activity and inhibits the catalytic activity of mTORC2 in the absence of insulin. This autoinhibition is relieved upon binding to PI3K-generated PIP_{3} at the plasma membrane. mSin1 subunit can also be phosphorylated by Akt. This indicates the existence of a positive feedback loop in which partial activation of Akt stimulates the activation of mTORC2. The complex then phosphorylates and fully activates Akt.

What might come as a surprise is that mTORC2 signaling is also regulated by mTORC1. This is due to the presence of a negative feedback loop between mTORC1 and insulin/PI3K signaling. Grb10, a negative regulator of insulin/IGF-1 receptor signaling upstream of Akt and mTORC2, is phosphorylated and therefore activated by mTORC1. Additionally, some components of G protein signalling has been revealed as important regulators of mTORC2 activity as Ric-8B protein and some lipid metabolites.

=== Downstream signaling ===
mTORC2 controls cell survival and proliferation mainly through phosphorylation of several members of the AGC (PKA/PKG/PKC) protein kinase family. mTORC2 regulates actin cytoskeleton through PKCα but is able to phosphorylate other members of the PKC family that have various regulatory functions in cell migration and cytoskeletal remodeling. mTORC2 plays a pivotal role in phosphorylation and thus in activation of Akt, which is a vital signaling component downstream from PI3K once active, and also in phosphorylation of SGK1, PKC and HDACs.

== Role in disease ==
Since mTORC2 plays a crucial role in metabolic regulation, it can be linked to many human pathologies. Deregulation of mTOR signaling, including mTORC2, affects transduction of insulin signal and therefore can disrupt its biological functions and lead to metabolic disorders, such as type 2 diabetes mellitus. In many types of human cancer, hyperactivation of mTORC2 caused by mutations and aberrant amplifications of mTORC2 core components is frequently observed. On metabolic level, activation of mTORC2 stimulates processes related to alteration of glucose metabolism in cancer cells, altogether known as Warburg effect. mTORC2-mediated lipogenesis has been linked to promotion of hepatocellular carcinoma through stimulation of glycerophospholipid and sphingolipid synthesis.

Although mTORC2 is acutely insensitive to rapamycin, chronic rapamycin treatment abrogates mTORC2 signaling, leading to insulin resistance and glucose intolerance. By contrast, dietary administration of Torin1, a dual mTORC1/2 inhibitor, resulted in prolonged lifespan in D. melanogaster with no reduction in fertility and Akt haploinsufficiency, an mTORC2 downstream target, extended lifespan in mice.

The mTORC2 pathways plays a crucial role in pathogenesis of lung fibrosis, and inhibitors of its active site such as sapanisertib (MLN-0128) have potential in the treatment of this disease and similar fibrotic lung diseases.

Chronic mTORC2 activity may play a role in systemic lupus erythematosus by impairing lysosome function.

Studies using mice with tissue-specific loss of Rictor, and thus inactive mTORC2, have found that mTORC2 plays a critical role in the regulation of glucose homeostasis. Liver-specific disruption of mTORC2 through hepatic deletion of the gene Rictor leads to glucose intolerance, hepatic insulin resistance, decreased hepatic lipogenesis, and decreased male lifespan. Adipose-specific disruption of mTORC2 through deletion of Rictor may protect from a high-fat diet in young mice, but results in hepatic steatosis and insulin resistance in older mice. The role of mTORC2 in skeletal muscle has taken time to uncover, but genetic loss of mTORC2/Rictor in skeletal muscle results in decreased insulin-stimulated glucose uptake, and resistance to the effects of an mTOR kinase inhibitor on insulin resistance, highlighting a critical role for mTOR in the regulation of glucose homeostasis in this tissue. Loss of mTORC2/Rictor in pancreatic beta cells results in reduced beta cell mass and insulin secretion, and hyperglycemia and glucose intolerance. mTORC2 activity in the hypothalamus of mice increases with age, and deletion of Rictor in hypothalamic neurons promotes obesity, frailty, and shorter lifespan in mice.
