= Surendra Nath Sehgal =

Indian-Canadian-American Scientist

- Born: 1932; Khushab, Punjab Province, British India (now in Punjab, Pakistan)
- Died: January 21, 2003
- Education: Banaras Hindu University, University of Bristol
- Employer: Wyeth
- Scientific career
- Thesis: A study of some factors influencing the action of Anti-biotics on Micro-organisms : with special reference to the action of Streptomycin on Staphylococcus aureus
- Doctoral advisor: Alan H. Linton

Surendra Nath Sehgal (1932–2003) was an Indian-Canadian-American microbiologist and pharmaceutical scientist most widely known for his discovery and development of Rapamycin (Sirolimus), a immunosuppressant drug widely used in organ transplantation. Rapamycin has also attracted attention as a potential anti-cancer and anti-aging drug.

== Early life and education ==
Surendra (Suren) Nath Sehgal, as born in Khushab in pre-partition India (now Pakistan). His father, Sita Ram Sehgal, owned a pharmaceutical factory, but relocated to New Delhi in 1947 after the Partition of India.

Sehgal completed a B.Pharm in 1952 and an M.Pharm in 1953 from Banaras Hindu University. At 21, he moved to England to pursue his Ph.D. in Microbiology and Immunology at the University of Bristol, graduating in 1957.

== Career ==
After completing his Ph.D., Sehgal accepted a postdoctoral fellowship at the National Research Council of Canada. In 1959, he joined Ayerst Research Laboratories in Montreal, becoming part of the Department of Microbiology.

In 1964, Montreal bacteriologist Georges Nogrady collected soil samples from Easter Island as part of a Canadian medical expedition. These soil samples contained a bacterium, Streptomyces hydroscopicus AY B-994, which showed anti-fungal properties. Isolates of these bacteria were obtained by Sehgal and his team at Ayerst. They found that the activity of these bacteria was the result of a novel compound, later named Rapamycin.

Ayerst consolidated their research operations in the United States by closing their laboratory in Montreal in 1983. Sehgal relocated to Princeton, New Jersey to continue his work. Initially, the program into rapamycin was cancelled and the bacterial samples were slated for destruction. Sehgal stored vials of the rapamycin-producing bacteria in his home freezer to prevent their destruction and transported them into the USA with his personal belongings in a homemade dry-ice cooler.

Ayerst's laboratories were merged with Wyeth's in 1987. In response to Sehgal's advocacy, new management at Wyeth restored support for development of rapamycin as a drug in 1988. This reinvigorated program eventually led to the FDA approval of rapamycin as an immunosuppressant to prevent organ transplant rejection in 1999. The drug is sold as RAPAMUNE (sirolimus).

== Awards and distinctions ==
- 1997 Lifetime Achievement Award. “For his outstanding landmark contribution in discovering an effective immunosuppressive drug for organ transplantation.” Awarded by The Indian Society of Organ Transplantation.
- 1997 Elected Fellow of American Academy of Microbiology
- 2000 Lifetime Achievement Award. The Canadian Transplantation Society

== Personal life and legacy ==
Sehgal became a Canadian citizen while he worked for Ayerst in Montreal. He later became a dual citizen of Canada and the United States after relocating to Princeton.

Sehgal was diagnosed with stage 4 metastatic colon cancer in 1998. He died at home in Seattle on January 21, 2003.
