= Proline rich 5 like =

Protein-coding gene in the species Homo sapiens

PRR5L

Identifiers
- Aliases: PRR5L, PROTOR2, proline rich 5 like
- External IDs: OMIM: 611728; MGI: 1919696; HomoloGene: 11753; GeneCards: PRR5L; OMA:PRR5L - orthologs

Gene location (Human)
Chr.	Chromosome 11 (human)
Band	11p13-p12	Start	36,296,288 bp
Band	11p13-p12	End	36,465,204 bp

Gene location (Mouse)
Chr.	Chromosome 2 (mouse)
Band	2|2 E2	Start	101,544,630 bp
Band	2|2 E2	End	101,713,372 bp
RNA expression pattern
Bgee	Human / Mouse (ortholog); Top expressed in: mucosa of transverse colon; granulocyte; rectum; spleen; C1 segment; secondary oocyte; testicle; corpus callosum; monocyte; mucosa of sigmoid colon / Top expressed in: hand; lumbar subsegment of spinal cord; molar; hair follicle; zygote; serosa of urinary bladder; primary oocyte; secondary oocyte; skin of hand; medullary collecting duct; More reference expression data
BioGPS	n/a
Gene ontology
Molecular function	ubiquitin protein ligase binding; protein binding
Cellular component	TORC2 complex
Biological process	TORC2 signaling; negative regulation of protein phosphorylation; positive regulation of phosphatidylinositol 3-kinase signaling; negative regulation of signal transduction; positive regulation of protein phosphorylation; regulation of fibroblast migration; cellular response to oxidative stress; positive regulation of mRNA catabolic process; positive regulation of intracellular protein transport
Sources:Amigo / QuickGO
Orthologs
Species	Human	Mouse
Entrez	79899	72446
Ensembl	ENSG00000135362	ENSMUSG00000032841
UniProt	Q6MZQ0	A2AVJ5
RefSeq (mRNA)	NM_024841; NM_001160167; NM_001160168; NM_001160169	NM_001083810; NM_001110849; NM_175181; NM_001355625
RefSeq (protein)	NP_001153639; NP_001153640; NP_001153641; NP_079117	NP_001077279; NP_001104319; NP_780390; NP_001342554
Location (UCSC)	Chr 11: 36.3 – 36.47 Mb	Chr 2: 101.54 – 101.71 Mb
PubMed search
- Wikidata
View/Edit Human	View/Edit Mouse

Proline rich 5 like is a protein that in humans is encoded by the PRR5L gene. Involved in ubiquitination along with TORC2 signaling as part of the TORC2 complex.
