= DEPTOR =

Protein-coding gene in the species Homo sapiens

Identifiers
- Aliases: DEPTOR, DEP.6, DEPDC6, DEP domain containing MTOR-interacting protein, DEP domain containing MTOR interacting protein
- External IDs: OMIM: 612974; MGI: 2146322; GeneCards: DEPTOR

Gene location (Human)
Chr.	Chromosome 8 (human)
Band	8q24.12	Start	119,873,717 bp
Band	8q24.12	End	120,050,918 bp

Gene location (Mouse)
Chr.	Chromosome 15 (mouse)
Band	15 D1|15 21.96 cM	Start	54,975,713 bp
Band	15 D1|15 21.96 cM	End	55,122,667 bp
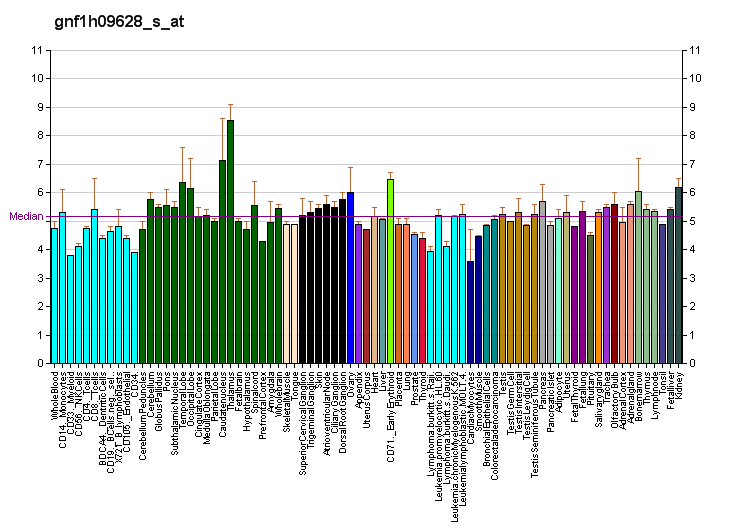

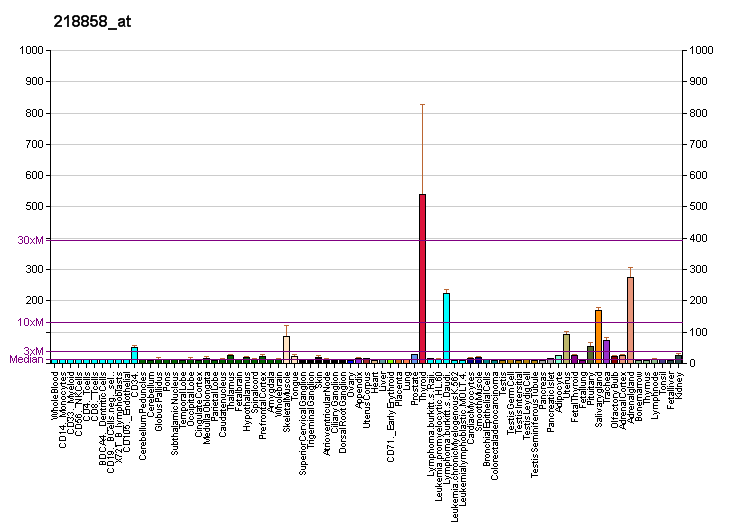
RNA expression pattern
Bgee	Human / Mouse (ortholog); Top expressed in: parotid gland; Skeletal muscle tissue of biceps brachii; decidua; glutes; vastus lateralis muscle; Skeletal muscle tissue of rectus abdominis; triceps brachii muscle; hair follicle; gastrocnemius muscle; deltoid muscle / Top expressed in: lacrimal gland; parotid gland; pyloric antrum; median eminence; triceps brachii muscle; brown adipose tissue; sternocleidomastoid muscle; tunica adventitia of aorta; vastus lateralis muscle; zygote; More reference expression data
BioGPS	More reference expression data
Gene ontology
Molecular function	protein binding
Cellular component	intracellular anatomical structure; cytoplasm
Biological process	intracellular signal transduction; regulation of extrinsic apoptotic signaling pathway; negative regulation of cell size; negative regulation of protein kinase activity; negative regulation of TOR signaling
Sources:Amigo / QuickGO
Orthologs
Databases	NCBI: entry; OMA: entry
Species	Human	Mouse
Entrez	64798	97998
Ensembl	ENSG00000155792	ENSMUSG00000022419
UniProt	Q8TB45	Q570Y9
RefSeq (mRNA)	NM_022783; NM_001283012	NM_001037937; NM_145470
RefSeq (protein)	NP_001269941; NP_073620	NP_001033026; NP_663445
Location (UCSC)	Chr 8: 119.87 – 120.05 Mb	Chr 15: 54.98 – 55.12 Mb
PubMed search
- Wikidata
View/Edit Human	View/Edit Mouse

DEP domain-containing mTOR-interacting protein (DEPTOR) also known as DEP domain-containing protein 6 (DEPDC6) is a protein that in humans is encoded by the DEPTOR gene.

== Structure ==
The gene DEPTOR can be found only in vertebrates. In human, DEPTOR gene locates at chromosome 8, 8q24.12 with protein size 409 a.a. Human DEPTOR contains two N-terminal DEP domains and a C-terminal PDZ domain.

== Function ==
DEPTOR is involved in mTOR signaling pathway as an endogenous regulator. A direct interaction between DEPTOR and mTOR has been shown. Overexpression of DEPTOR downregulates the activity of mTORC1 and mTORC2 in vitro. mTORC1 and mTORC2 can both inhibit DEPTOR through phosphorylation.

== Metabolism ==
DEPTOR cell-autonomously regulates adipogenesis. In the muscle, Baf60c promotes a switch from oxidative to glycolytic myofiber type through DEPTOR-mediated Akt/PKB activation. Within the brain, DEPTOR is highly expressed in the hippocampus, the medio-basal hypothalamus and the circumventricular organs. Overexpression of DEPTOR in the medio-basal hypothalamus protects mice against high-fat diet-induced obesity by modulating Akt/PKB signaling.

== Clinical cancer ==
Although in most cancer, mTOR pathway is constitutively activated and the expression of DEPTOR is low, one study has found that DEPTOR is overexpressed in multiple myeloma cells and is necessary for their survival.
