= RRAGB =

Protein-coding gene in the species Homo sapiens

Identifiers
- Aliases: RRAGB, RAGB, bA465E19.1, Ras related GTP binding B
- External IDs: OMIM: 300725; MGI: 3038613; GeneCards: RRAGB

Gene location (Mouse)
Chr.	X chromosome (mouse)
Band	X|X F3	Start	151,922,977 bp
Band	X|X F3	End	151,954,939 bp
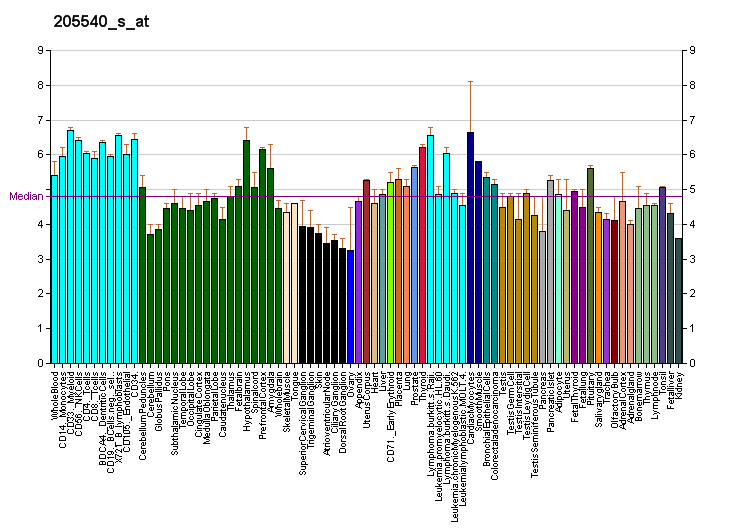
RNA expression pattern
Bgee	Human / Mouse (ortholog); n/a / Top expressed in: hypothalamus; hippocampus proper; cerebellum; epiblast; cerebellar cortex; dentate gyrus of hippocampal formation granule cell; primary visual cortex; Cortex of frontal lobe; superior frontal gyrus; olfactory bulb
BioGPS	More reference expression data
Gene ontology
Molecular function	nucleotide binding; GTP binding; protein binding; guanyl ribonucleotide binding; GTPase activity; protein heterodimerization activity; GTPase binding
Cellular component	cytoplasm; cytosol; lysosomal membrane; lysosome; nucleus; Gtr1-Gtr2 GTPase complex
Biological process	regulation of TOR signaling; cellular response to amino acid starvation; cellular response to amino acid stimulus; positive regulation of TOR signaling; regulation of autophagy; regulation of macroautophagy; positive regulation of TORC1 signaling; cellular response to leucine starvation; cellular response to starvation
Sources:Amigo / QuickGO
Orthologs
Databases	NCBI: entry; OMA: entry
Species	Human	Mouse
Entrez	10325	245670
Ensembl	ENSG00000083750	ENSMUSG00000041658
UniProt	Q5VZM2	Q6NTA4
RefSeq (mRNA)	NM_006064; NM_016656	NM_001004154
RefSeq (protein)	NP_006055; NP_057740; NP_001340940; NP_001340942	NP_001004154
Location (UCSC)	n/a	Chr X: 151.92 – 151.95 Mb
PubMed search
- Wikidata
View/Edit Human	View/Edit Mouse

Ras-related GTP-binding protein B is a protein that in humans is encoded by the RRAGB gene.

Ras-homologous GTPases constitute a large family of signal transducers that alternate between an activated, GTP-binding state and an inactivated, GDP-binding state. These proteins represent cellular switches that are operated by GTP-exchange factors and factors that stimulate their intrinsic GTPase activity. All GTPases of the Ras superfamily have in common the presence of six conserved motifs involved in GTP/GDP binding, three of which are phosphate-/magnesium-binding sites (PM1-PM3) and three of which are guanine nucleotide-binding sites (G1-G3). Transcript variants encoding distinct isoforms have been identified. MTORC1 responds to amino acids via interaction with RAGB.
