= AKT1S1 =

Protein-coding gene in the species Homo sapiens

Identifiers
- Aliases: AKT1S1, Lobe, PRAS40, AKT1 substrate 1
- External IDs: OMIM: 610221; MGI: 1914855; HomoloGene: 12162; GeneCards: AKT1S1; OMA:AKT1S1 - orthologs

Gene location (Human)
Chr.	Chromosome 19 (human)
Band	19q13.33	Start	49,869,033 bp
Band	19q13.33	End	49,878,459 bp

Gene location (Mouse)
Chr.	Chromosome 7 (mouse)
Band	7|7 B3	Start	44,498,415 bp
Band	7|7 B3	End	44,504,845 bp
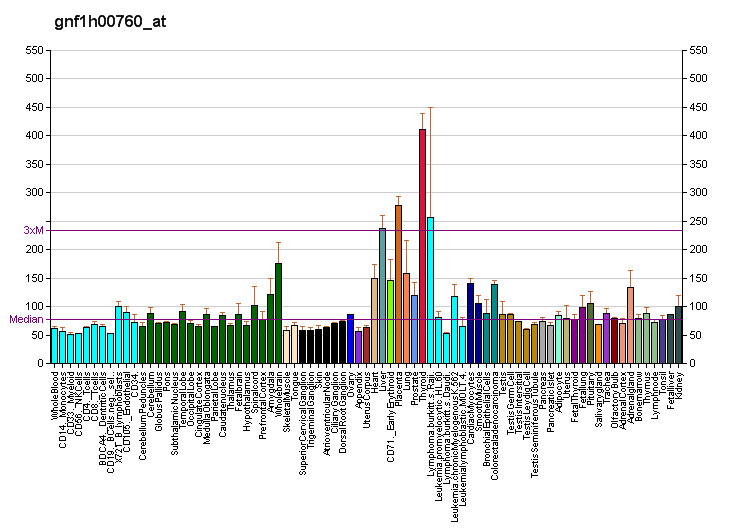
RNA expression pattern
Bgee	Human / Mouse (ortholog); Top expressed in: gastrocnemius muscle; muscle of thigh; right adrenal gland; right adrenal cortex; left adrenal gland; left adrenal cortex; mucosa of transverse colon; skin of leg; apex of heart; gastric mucosa / Top expressed in: muscle of thigh; yolk sac; extensor digitorum longus muscle; knee joint; molar; lip; vastus lateralis muscle; atrium; esophagus; plantaris muscle; More reference expression data
BioGPS	More reference expression data
Gene ontology
Molecular function	protein binding
Cellular component	TORC1 complex; nucleus; nucleoplasm; cytoplasm; cytosol; protein-containing complex
Biological process	regulation of cellular response to heat; negative regulation of TOR signaling; regulation of neuron apoptotic process; negative regulation of protein kinase activity; negative regulation of cell size; neurotrophin TRK receptor signaling pathway; TORC1 signaling; regulation of apoptotic process
Sources:Amigo / QuickGO
Orthologs
Species	Human	Mouse
Entrez	84335	67605
Ensembl	ENSG00000204673	ENSMUSG00000011096
UniProt	Q96B36	Q9D1F4
RefSeq (mRNA)	NM_032375; NM_001098632; NM_001098633; NM_001278159; NM_001278160	NM_001253920; NM_001290694; NM_001290695; NM_026270; NM_001382480 NM_001382481; NM_001382482; NM_001382483; NM_001382484
RefSeq (protein)	NP_001092102; NP_001092103; NP_001265088; NP_001265089; NP_115751	NP_001240849; NP_001277623; NP_001277624; NP_080546; NP_001369409 NP_001369410; NP_001369411; NP_001369412; NP_001369413
Location (UCSC)	Chr 19: 49.87 – 49.88 Mb	Chr 7: 44.5 – 44.5 Mb
PubMed search
- Wikidata
View/Edit Human	View/Edit Mouse

Proline-rich AKT1 substrate 1 (PRAS) is a protein that in humans is encoded by the AKT1S1 gene.
