= Ribosomal protein S6 =

Protein-coding gene in the species Homo sapiens

RPS6

Identifiers
- Aliases: RPS6, S6, ribosomal protein S6
- External IDs: OMIM: 180460; MGI: 98159; GeneCards: RPS6
Available structures
PDB	Ortholog search: PDBe RCSB
PDB	List of PDB id codes 4UG0, 4V6X, 5A2Q, 5AJ0, 4D5L, 4UJE, 5FLX, 4UJC, 3J7P, 4KZZ, 4UJD, 4KZY, 4D61, 3J7R, 4KZX

Gene location (Human)
Chr.	Chromosome 9 (human)
Band	9p22.1	Start	19,375,715 bp
Band	9p22.1	End	19,380,236 bp

Gene location (Mouse)
Chr.	Chromosome 4 (mouse)
Band	4|4 C4	Start	86,772,897 bp
Band	4|4 C4	End	86,775,649 bp
RNA expression pattern
Bgee	Human / Mouse (ortholog); Top expressed in: skin of hip; skin of thigh; lactiferous duct; gonad; pylorus; pancreatic ductal cell; left ovary; vulva; germinal epithelium; caput epididymis / Top expressed in: uterus; thymus; ovary; embryo; lens; urinary bladder; spleen; ventricular zone; embryo; epiblast; More reference expression data
BioGPS	n/a
Gene ontology
Molecular function	structural constituent of ribosome; protein binding; protein kinase binding; RNA binding
Cellular component	cell body; cytosol; ribosome; membrane; intracellular anatomical structure; nucleolus; small ribosomal subunit; cytoplasmic ribonucleoprotein granule; nucleus; nucleoplasm; cytoplasm; polysome; cytosolic small ribosomal subunit; dendrite; perinuclear region of cytoplasm; endoplasmic reticulum; ribonucleoprotein complex
Biological process	viral transcription; SRP-dependent cotranslational protein targeting to membrane; TOR signaling; positive regulation of apoptotic process; translational initiation; nuclear-transcribed mRNA catabolic process, nonsense-mediated decay; protein biosynthesis; G1 phase; mitotic cell cycle; placenta development; T cell proliferation involved in immune response; rRNA processing; activation-induced cell death of T cells; mitotic cell cycle checkpoint signaling; gastrulation; mammalian oogenesis stage; T cell differentiation in thymus; ribosomal small subunit biogenesis; glucose homeostasis; negative regulation of apoptotic process; erythrocyte development; G1/S transition of mitotic cell cycle
Sources:Amigo / QuickGO
Orthologs
Databases	NCBI: entry; OMA: entry
Species	Human	Mouse
Entrez	6194	20104
Ensembl	ENSG00000137154	ENSMUSG00000028495
UniProt	P62753	P62754
RefSeq (mRNA)	NM_001010	NM_009096
RefSeq (protein)	NP_001001	NP_033122
Location (UCSC)	Chr 9: 19.38 – 19.38 Mb	Chr 4: 86.77 – 86.78 Mb
PubMed search
- Wikidata
View/Edit Human	View/Edit Mouse

Ribosomal protein S6 (rpS6 or eS6) is a component of the 40S ribosomal subunit and is therefore involved in translation. Mouse model studies have shown that phosphorylation of eS6 is involved in the regulation of cell size, cell proliferation, and glucose homeostasis.

Studies show that the p70 ribosomal protein S6 kinases (S6K1 and S6K2) and p90 ribosomal protein S6 kinases (RSK) both phosphorylate eS6 and that S6K1 and S6K2 predominate this function.

Pathways leading to the induction of human eS6 phosphorylation have been found to enhance IL-8 protein synthesis. This mechanism is dependent on A/U-rich proximal sequences (APS) found in the 3'UTR of IL-8 immediately after the stop codon.
