= Sperm-associated antigen 5 =

Protein-coding gene in the species Homo sapiens

SPAG5

Identifiers
- Aliases: SPAG5, DEEPEST, MAP126, hMAP126, Sperm associated antigen 5
- External IDs: OMIM: 615562; MGI: 1927470; GeneCards: SPAG5

Gene location (Human)
Chr.	Chromosome 17 (human)
Band	17q11.2	Start	28,577,565 bp
Band	17q11.2	End	28,599,025 bp

Gene location (Mouse)
Chr.	Chromosome 11 (mouse)
Band	11 B5|11 46.74 cM	Start	78,192,355 bp
Band	11 B5|11 46.74 cM	End	78,213,283 bp
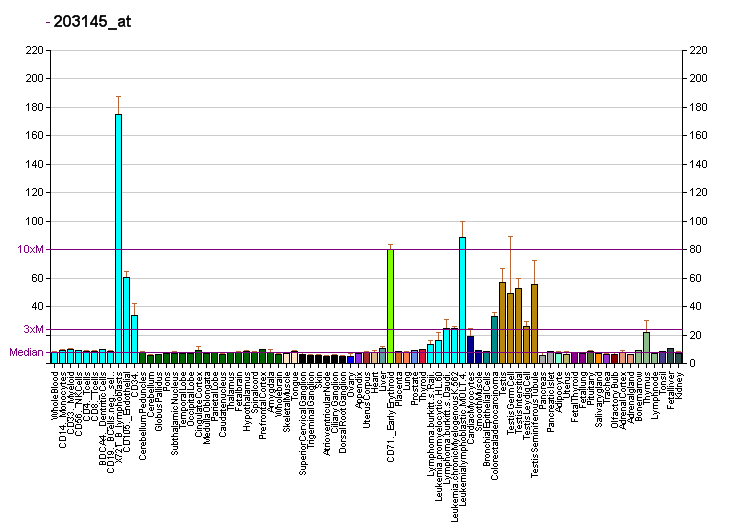
RNA expression pattern
Bgee	Human / Mouse (ortholog); Top expressed in: left testis; right testis; ventricular zone; gonad; ganglionic eminence; mucosa of transverse colon; testicle; right lobe of liver; right lobe of thyroid gland; human kidney / Top expressed in: epithelium of lens; spermatocyte; ventricular zone; spermatid; tail of embryo; lumbar subsegment of spinal cord; seminiferous tubule; epiblast; genital tubercle; mandibular prominence; More reference expression data
BioGPS	More reference expression data
Gene ontology
Molecular function	protein binding; microtubule binding
Cellular component	spindle; mitotic spindle; chromosome; microtubule organizing center; centriolar satellite; spindle pole; chromosome, centromeric region; microtubule plus-end; midbody; microtubule; kinetochore; cytoskeleton; cytoplasm; mitotic spindle pole; spindle microtubule
Biological process	mitotic sister chromatid segregation; cell cycle; spindle organization; cell division; protein localization to centrosome; chromosome segregation; regulation of attachment of spindle microtubules to kinetochore; positive regulation of intracellular transport; regulation of metaphase plate congression; positive regulation of spindle assembly; establishment of spindle orientation
Sources:Amigo / QuickGO
Orthologs
Databases	NCBI: entry; OMA: entry
Species	Human	Mouse
Entrez	10615	54141
Ensembl	ENSG00000076382	ENSMUSG00000002055
UniProt	Q96R06	Q7TME2
RefSeq (mRNA)	NM_006461	NM_017407
RefSeq (protein)	NP_006452	NP_059103
Location (UCSC)	Chr 17: 28.58 – 28.6 Mb	Chr 11: 78.19 – 78.21 Mb
PubMed search
- Wikidata
View/Edit Human	View/Edit Mouse

Sperm-associated antigen 5 is a protein that in humans is encoded by the SPAG5 gene.

This gene encodes a protein associated with the mitotic spindle apparatus. The encoded protein may be involved in the functional and dynamic regulation of mitotic spindles.
