= MAPKAP1 =

Protein-coding gene in the species Homo sapiens

Available structures
PDB	Ortholog search: PDBe RCSB
PDB	List of PDB id codes 3VOQ

Identifiers
- Aliases: MAPKAP1, JC310, MIP1, SIN1, SIN1b, SIN1g, mitogen-activated protein kinase associated protein 1, MAPK associated protein 1
- External IDs: OMIM: 610558; MGI: 2444554; HomoloGene: 11473; GeneCards: MAPKAP1; OMA:MAPKAP1 - orthologs

Gene location (Human)
Chr.	Chromosome 9 (human)
Band	9q33.3	Start	125,437,393 bp
Band	9q33.3	End	125,707,234 bp

Gene location (Mouse)
Chr.	Chromosome 2 (mouse)
Band	2|2 B	Start	34,406,771 bp
Band	2|2 B	End	34,624,950 bp
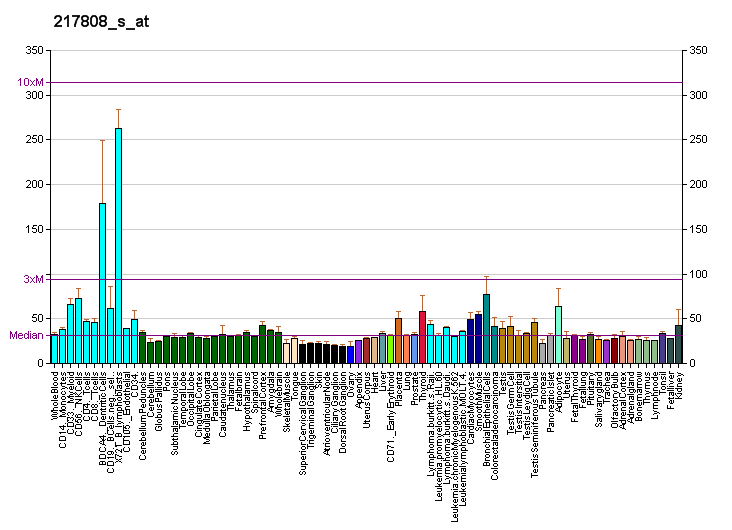
RNA expression pattern
Bgee	Human / Mouse (ortholog); Top expressed in: muscle of thigh; apex of heart; stromal cell of endometrium; oocyte; gastrocnemius muscle; secondary oocyte; right auricle of heart; left adrenal cortex; left ventricle; right adrenal cortex / Top expressed in: zygote; genital tubercle; secondary oocyte; tail of embryo; spermatocyte; muscle of thigh; ventricular zone; interventricular septum; epithelium of lens; spermatid; More reference expression data
BioGPS	More reference expression data
Gene ontology
Molecular function	phosphatidylinositol-3,5-bisphosphate binding; phosphatidylinositol-3,4-bisphosphate binding; phosphatidic acid binding; protein binding; phosphatidylinositol-4,5-bisphosphate binding; protein kinase binding; phosphatidylinositol-3,4,5-trisphosphate binding
Cellular component	Golgi apparatus; membrane; plasma membrane; nucleoplasm; cytoplasmic vesicle; nucleus; cytosol; TORC2 complex; cytoplasm
Biological process	substantia nigra development; negative regulation of Ras protein signal transduction; establishment or maintenance of actin cytoskeleton polarity; stress-activated protein kinase signaling cascade; TORC2 signaling; activation of protein kinase B activity; positive regulation of peptidyl-serine phosphorylation; regulation of cellular response to oxidative stress
Sources:Amigo / QuickGO
Orthologs
Species	Human	Mouse
Entrez	79109	227743
Ensembl	ENSG00000119487	ENSMUSG00000038696
UniProt	Q9BPZ7	Q8BKH7
RefSeq (mRNA)	NM_001006617; NM_001006618; NM_001006619; NM_001006620; NM_001006621 NM_024117	NM_001290625; NM_001290626; NM_177345; NM_001362919; NM_001362920 NM_001362921
RefSeq (protein)	NP_001006618; NP_001006619; NP_001006620; NP_001006621; NP_001006622 NP_077022	NP_001277554; NP_001277555; NP_796319; NP_001349848; NP_001349849 NP_001349850
Location (UCSC)	Chr 9: 125.44 – 125.71 Mb	Chr 2: 34.41 – 34.62 Mb
PubMed search
- Wikidata
View/Edit Human	View/Edit Mouse

Target of rapamycin complex 2 subunit MAPKAP1 is a protein that in humans is encoded by the MAPKAP1 gene. As the name indicates, it is a subunit of mTOR complex 2.

This gene encodes a protein that is highly similar to the yeast SIN1 protein, a stress-activated protein kinase. Alternatively spliced transcript variants encoding distinct isoforms have been described. Alternate polyadenylation sites as well as alternate 3' UTRs have been identified for transcripts of this gene.
