= MLST8 =

Protein-coding gene in humans

Identifiers
- Aliases: MLST8, GBL, GbetaL, LST8, POP3, WAT1, MTOR associated protein, LST8 homolog
- External IDs: OMIM: 612190; MGI: 1929514; GeneCards: MLST8
Available structures
PDB	Ortholog search: PDBe RCSB
PDB	List of PDB id codes 4JSN, 4JSP, 4JSV, 4JSX, 4JT5, 4JT6, 5FLC

Gene location (Human)
Chr.	Chromosome 16 (human)
Band	16p13.3	Start	2,204,248 bp
Band	16p13.3	End	2,209,453 bp

Gene location (Mouse)
Chr.	Chromosome 17 (mouse)
Band	17|17 A3.3	Start	24,692,525 bp
Band	17|17 A3.3	End	24,698,052 bp
RNA expression pattern
Bgee	Human / Mouse (ortholog); Top expressed in: right hemisphere of cerebellum; right frontal lobe; prefrontal cortex; anterior cingulate cortex; muscle of thigh; apex of heart; Brodmann area 9; amygdala; nucleus accumbens; left testis / Top expressed in: granulocyte; neural layer of retina; Ileal epithelium; genital tubercle; ventricular zone; dentate gyrus of hippocampal formation granule cell; spermatocyte; primary visual cortex; muscle of thigh; cerebellar cortex; More reference expression data
BioGPS	n/a
Gene ontology
Molecular function	protein binding; protein serine/threonine kinase activator activity
Cellular component	cytoplasm; nucleoplasm; cytosol; TORC1 complex; TORC2 complex
Biological process	positive regulation of actin filament polymerization; regulation of actin cytoskeleton organization; regulation of GTPase activity; positive regulation of peptidyl-tyrosine phosphorylation; regulation of cellular response to heat; TORC1 signaling; positive regulation of protein serine/threonine kinase activity; regulation of macroautophagy; activation of protein kinase B activity; TOR signaling; positive regulation of TOR signaling
Sources:Amigo / QuickGO
Orthologs
Databases	NCBI: entry; OMA: entry
Species	Human	Mouse
Entrez	64223	56716
Ensembl	ENSG00000167965	ENSMUSG00000024142
UniProt	Q9BVC4	Q9DCJ1
RefSeq (mRNA)	NM_001199173; NM_001199174; NM_001199175; NM_022372; NM_001352057 NM_001352059; NM_001352060	NM_001252463; NM_001252464; NM_001252465; NM_019988
RefSeq (protein)	NP_001186102; NP_001186103; NP_001186104; NP_071767; NP_001338986 NP_001338988; NP_001338989	NP_001239392; NP_001239393; NP_001239394; NP_064372
Location (UCSC)	Chr 16: 2.2 – 2.21 Mb	Chr 17: 24.69 – 24.7 Mb
PubMed search
- Wikidata
View/Edit Human	View/Edit Mouse

Target of rapamycin complex subunit LST8, also known as mammalian lethal with SEC13 protein 8 (mLST8) or TORC subunit LST8 or G protein beta subunit-like (GβL or Gable), is a protein that in humans is encoded by the MLST8 (MTOR associated protein, LST8 homolog) gene. It is a subunit of both mTORC1 and mTORC2, complexes that regulate cell growth and survival in response to nutrient, energy, redox, and hormonal signals. It is upregulated in several human colon and prostate cancer cell lines and tissues. Knockdown of mLST8 prevented mTORC formation and inhibited tumor growth and invasiveness.
