= KICSTOR subunit 2 =

KICS2

Identifiers
- Aliases: KICS2, chromosome 12 open reading frame 66, C12orf66, KICSTOR subunit 2
- External IDs: OMIM: 617420; MGI: 2670984; GeneCards: KICS2

Gene location (Human)
Chr.	Chromosome 12 (human)
Band	12q14.2	Start	64,186,316 bp
Band	12q14.2	End	64,222,296 bp

Gene location (Mouse)
Chr.	Chromosome 10 (mouse)
Band	10|10 D2	Start	121,575,842 bp
Band	10|10 D2	End	121,588,783 bp
RNA expression pattern
Bgee	Human / Mouse (ortholog); Top expressed in: secondary oocyte; germinal epithelium; skin of hip; skin of thigh; testicle; islet of Langerhans; gonad; Brodmann area 23; mucosa of paranasal sinus; epithelium of nasopharynx / Top expressed in: lumbar spinal ganglion; zygote; granulocyte; secondary oocyte; primary oocyte; yolk sac; tail of embryo; genital tubercle; primary visual cortex; embryo; More reference expression data
BioGPS	n/a
Orthologs
Databases	NCBI: entry; OMA: entry
Species	Human	Mouse
Entrez	144577	270802
Ensembl	ENSG00000174206	ENSMUSG00000053684
UniProt	Q96MD2	Q6P1I3
RefSeq (mRNA)	NM_001300940; NM_001300941; NM_152440	NM_173022; NM_001359720
RefSeq (protein)	NP_001287869; NP_001287870; NP_689653	NP_766610; NP_001346649
Location (UCSC)	Chr 12: 64.19 – 64.22 Mb	Chr 10: 121.58 – 121.59 Mb
PubMed search
- Wikidata
View/Edit Human	View/Edit Mouse

KICSTOR subunit 2 is a protein that in humans is encoded by the KICS2 gene (previously C12orf66). The KICSTOR protein is one of four proteins in the KICSTOR protein complex which negatively regulates mechanistic target of rapamycin complex 1 (mTORC1) signaling.

== Gene ==
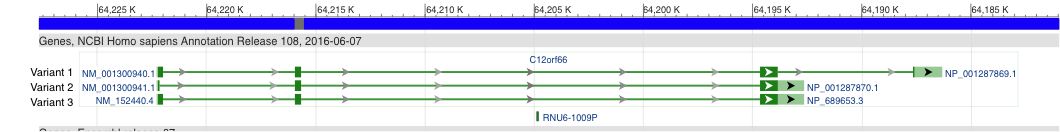
Human C12orf66 transcript variants

C12orf66 is located on the minus strand in the locus 12q14.2. C12orf66 variant 1 is 36 Mbp in length spanning the base pairs 64,186,312 - 64,222,296 on chromosome 12. There are 3 total C12orf66 transcript variants. C12orf66 variant 1 is the longest with 4 exons. C12orf66 variant 2 has a shortened exon 1 and is missing exon 4 compared to variant 1. C12orf66 variant 3 is missing exon 4.

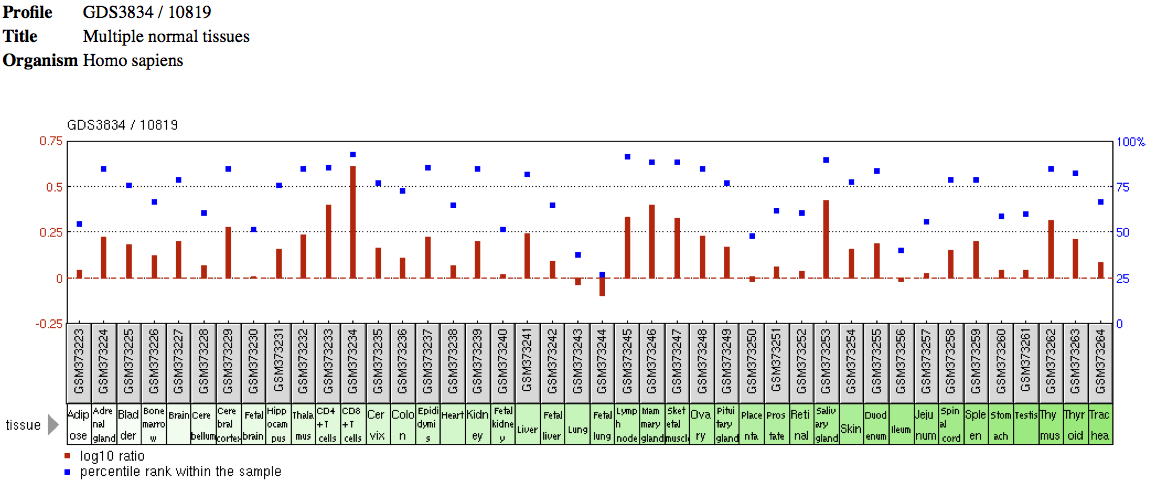
The expression profile for C12orf66 across a variety of tissue samples in the GDS3834 NCBI Geo set. Red bars represent individual expression values and should be considered arbitrary when making comparisons between samples. Blue boxes represent the expression level rank within a single sample and should be used to compare expression levels of the gene between samples.

=== Expression ===
In humans, C12orf66 has higher than average expression in a number of tissues such as endocrine glands as well as lymphoid tissues and cells. Additionally, C12orf66 expression is increased in a number of cancers including leukemia, breast cancer, cervical cancer, and a number of gastrointestinal related cancers. C12orf66 expression is higher earlier in development. A number of experiments using different human embryonic stem cell lines, oocytes, as well as erythroblasts found C12orf66 expression was increased in these cells earlier in development and expression decreased as these cells became more differentiated. Additionally, expression of C12orf66 in fetal organs is higher than C12orf66 expression in the same adult organs.

== Protein ==
The human C12orf66 protein is 446 amino acids in length with a molecular weight of 50kdal.

=== Function ===
C12orf66 is part of a larger protein complex called KICSTOR. KICSTOR is a complex of four proteins coded by the genes KPTN, ITFG2, C12orf66, and SZT2. The KICSTOR complex plays a role in regulating mTORC1 signaling. mTORC1 activates protein translation when the cell has sufficient amounts amino acids and energy. This ensures cell growth and proliferation occurs in ideal cellular environments. KICSTOR recruits the protein complex GATOR1, a negative regulator of mTORC1, to the correct location on the lysosome where mTORC1 signaling occurs. In addition to the localization of GATOR1 to the lysosome, KICSTOR is also necessary for the regulation of mTORC1 signaling by amino acid or glucose deprivation. Normally, amino acid or glucose deprivation inhibits mTORC1 signaling. However, loss of any one protein in the four protein KICSTOR complex resulted in a lack of inhibition of mTORC1 by amino acid or glucose deprivation and increased mTORC1 signaling. Thus, KICSTOR is a negative regulator of mTORC1 signaling that functions by localizing GATOR1 to the lysosomal surface as well inhibiting mTORC1 during periods of amino acid or glucose deprivation. How the KICSTOR complex directly inhibits mTORC1 as well as senses amino acid or glucose deprivation remains to be elucidated.

=== Clinical significance ===
Loss of the genomic locus 12q14 which contains the human protein encoding gene C12orf66 is linked to a number of developmental delays and neurodevelopment disorders such as macrocephaly. Additionally, one study found the level of C12orf66 expression is down-regulated in colorectal cancer. In this study, the amount of C12orf66 down-regulation along with the expression of a number of other genes were used as an accurate indicator of clinical outcome in patients with colorectal cancer. Thus, the level of C12orf66 gene expression reflected the survivability of these patients.

=== Protein-protein interactions ===
C12orf66 interacts with the three proteins of the KICSTOR complex coded by the genes KPTN, ITFG2, and SZT2 as well as GATOR1. Additionally, C12orf66 is predicted to interact with KRAS, DEPDC5, and C7orf60. These interactions were detected by high throughput affinity capture chromatography.

=== Homologs ===
C12orf66 is a highly conserved protein with a large number of orthologs and no known paralogs. The list of C12orf66 orthologs includes mammals, birds, reptiles, amphibians, fish, marine worms, mollusks, insects, and fungi.

C12orf66 Protein Orthologs
Genus and Species	Common Name	Time since last common ancestor (Million Years Ago)	Accession # (Protein)	Sequence Length	Sequence Identity (ALIGN)	Sequence Similarity (EMBOSS Needle)
Homo sapiens	Human	0 mya	NP_001287869.1	468 aa	100%	100%
Mus musclus	House Mouse	88 mya	NP_766610.2	445 aa	94.5%	91.7%
Gallus gallus	Chicken	320 mya	XP_416063.1	446 aa	93.3%	92.3%
Thamnophis sirtalis	Garder Snake	320 mya	XP_013927488.1	446 aa	89.8%	90.8%
Xenopus laevis	African Clawed Frog	353 mya	XP_018111484.1	478 aa	84.3%	80.9%
Danio rerio	Zebrafish	432 mya	NP_001025261.3	449 aa	77.5%	83.2%
Nematostella vectensis	Starlett sea anemone	685 mya	XP_001634917.1	440 aa	46.8%	63.9%
Branchiostoma belcheri	Lancelet	699 mya	XP_019643671.1	450 aa	48.9%	66.7%
Stegodyphus mimosarum	Spider	758 mya	KFM75667.1	492 aa	40.7%	52.2%
Lingula anatina	Lingula	758 mya	XP_013389803.1	438 aa	45.5%	62.0%
Saccoglossus kowalevskii	Acorn worm	758 mya	XP_006818351.1	421 aa	45.9%	60.8%
Priapulus caudatus	Marine worm	758 mya	XP_014664498.1	442 aa	43.6%	59.2%
Crassostrea gigas	Pacific Oyster	758 mya	XP_011430560.1	451 aa	42.2%	59.2%
Octopus bimaculoides	California two-spot octopus	758 mya	XP_014782952.1	504aa	37.6%	47.6%
Daphnia magna	Daphnia	758 mya	JAN84465.1	430 aa	39.1%	56.7%
Apis dorsata	Giant Honey Bee	758 mya	XP_006624940.1	428 aa	34.9%	54.0%
Polistes dominula	European paper wasp	758 mya	XP_015181516.1	434 aa	33.5%	53.1%
Bemisia tabaci	Silverleaf whitefly	758 mya	XP_018895945.1	418 aa	34.6%	52.1%
Tribolium castaneum	Red Flour Beetle	758 mya	KYB27801.1	551 aa	34.3%	40.8%
Lichtheimia corymbifera	Lichtheimia	1150	CDH55915.1	450 aa	23.4%	38.5%
