= Sleep-related hypermotor epilepsy =

- Specialty: Neurology

Sleep-related hypermotor epilepsy (SHE), previously known as nocturnal frontal lobe epilepsy, is a form of focal epilepsy characterized by seizures which arise during sleep. The seizures are most typically characterized by complex motor behaviors. It is a relatively uncommon form of epilepsy that constitutes approximately 9-13% of cases. This disorder is associated with cognitive impairment in at least half of patients as well as excessive daytime sleepiness due to poor sleep quality. This disorder is sometimes misdiagnosed as a non-epileptic sleep disorder. There are many potential causes of SHE including genetic, acquired injuries and structural abnormalities.

== History ==
In 1981, Lugaresi and Cirignotta described a group of 5 patients with paroxysmal attacks of violent movements of the extremities and dystonic-tonic posturing. It was initially uncertain whether these events constituted seizures or something else. However, the patients had a good clinical response to the anti-seizure medication carbamazepine. Ultimately, the epileptic nature of this condition was confirmed with EEG and suggested that they were coming from the frontal lobe. The term “nocturnal frontal lobe epilepsy” was suggested as a name for this condition. Later in 2014, a consensus conference recommended that the name be changed to sleep-related hypermotor epilepsy. There were three main justifications for this change: (1) not all seizures arise from the frontal lobe; (2) seizures do not necessarily occur during the night but rather from sleep; (3) hypermotor describes the most common visible clinical manifestation of the seizures.

== Symptoms ==
Seizures in SHE are brief and usually have an abrupt onset and offset. The observable clinical manifestations may consist of rapid, hyperkinetic movements as well as dystonic-tonic posturing of the limbs. Other potential manifestations include brief arousals from sleep or wandering ambulatory behavior. Non-motor manifestations (such as sensory or emotional phenomenon) are common and retained awareness during seizures may occur. Seizures usually occur during non-REM sleep. The frequency of seizures can be very high and as many as dozens may occur every night which results in poor sleep quality. In addition, many patients with SHE suffer from cognitive impairment and have behavioral/psychological problems. There are many risks associated with nocturnal seizures including concussion, suffocation and sudden unexpected death (SUDEP).

== Cause ==
Approximately 86% of SHE cases are sporadic, 14% of patients have a family history of epilepsy and 5% are inherited in an autosomal dominant manner (i.e. autosomal dominant sleep-related hypermotor epilepsy). Both genetic, structural and multifactorial etiologies can occur. In structural cases, the most common pathology is focal cortical dysplasia.

The first described mutation in SHE was found in genes coding for the neuronal nicotinic acetylcholine receptor. Since then multiple other genes have been identified including KCNT1, DEPDC5, NPRL2, NPRL3, PRIMA1, CABP4, CRH and others. In some cases, structural and genetic etiologies can coexist such as with mutations in DEPDC5.

== Diagnosis ==
The condition may be difficult to diagnose and misdiagnosis is common. The subject may be unaware they have a seizure disorder. To others, the involuntary movements made during sleep may appear no different from those typical of normal sleep. People who have nocturnal seizures may notice unusual conditions upon awakening in the morning, such as a headache, having wet the bed, having bitten the tongue, a bone or joint injury, muscle strains or weakness, fatigue, or lightheadedness. Others may notice unusual mental behaviors consistent with the aftermath of a seizure. Objects near the bed may have been knocked to the floor, or the subject may find themselves on the floor.

Diagnosis is based on clinical history but often EEG and/or polysomnography is required. In many patients the EEG can also be unhelpful as seizures may originate from deep in the brain. Polysomnography can be helpful distinguishing SHE from parasomnias as they often arise from different stages of sleep.

== Treatment ==
Like other forms of epilepsy, SHE can be treated with anti-seizure medications. Adequate control of seizures occur in approximately two-thirds of patients with anti-seizure medications while approximately one-third of patients do not appropriately respond. The relative efficacy of different medications has not been systematically investigated. Historically, low-dose carbamazepine has been the preferred medication for SHE and is often considered to be first-line. Other anti-seizure medications which have been studied for the treatment of SHE and found to have efficacy include: oxcarbazepine, topiramate, lacosamide and perampanel. Epilepsy surgery can be efficacious in refractory patients. In addition, there have been reports of successfully treating SHE due to mutations in CHRNA4 with nicotine patches.

== Sources ==
- Manford, Mark (2003), Practical Guide to Epilepsy, Butterworth-Heinemann, ISBN 978-0-7506-4621-5
