= Ragulator-Rag complex =

Aspect of cell metabolism

Lamtor1

Identifiers
- Symbol: 26068
- Alt. symbols: p18
- Alt. names: p18
- NCBI gene: 55004
- OMIM: 613510
- RefSeq: NM_017907.2
- UniProt: Q6IAA8

Other data
- Locus: Chr. 11 q13.4
Search for
- Structures: Swiss-model
- Domains: InterPro

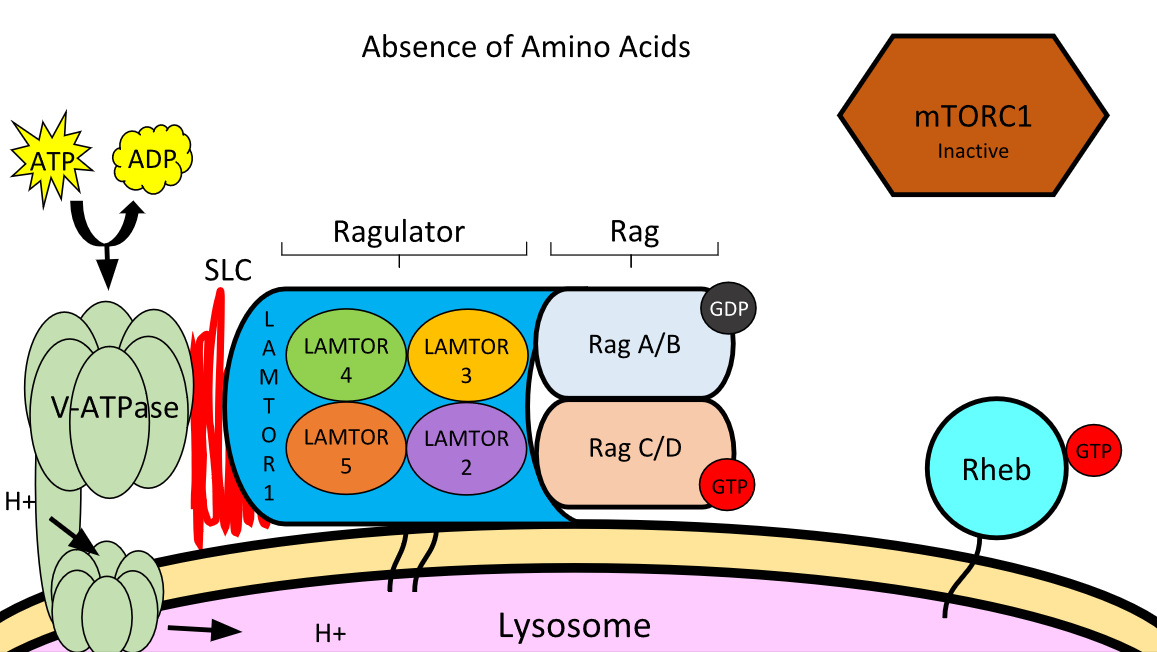
Ragulator-Rag Complex, inactive.

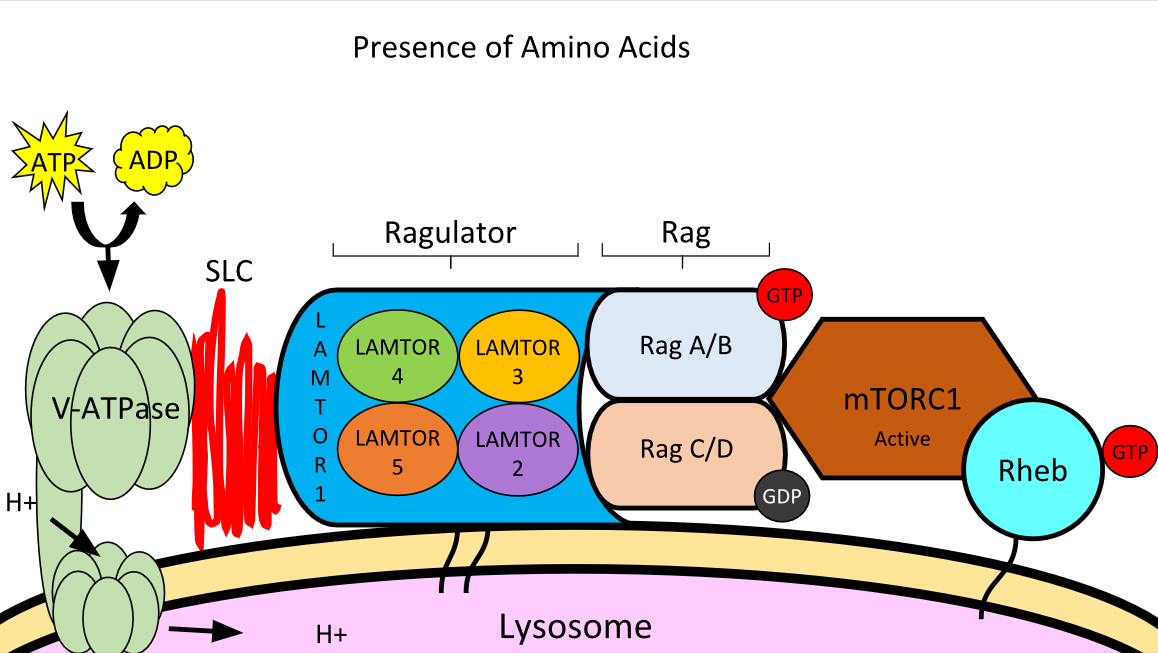
Ragulator-Rag Complex, active

The Ragulator-Rag complex is a regulator of lysosomal signalling and trafficking in eukaryotic cells, which plays an important role in regulating cell metabolism and growth in response to nutrient availability in the cell. The Ragulator-Rag Complex is composed of five LAMTOR subunits, which work to regulate MAPK and mTOR complex 1. The LAMTOR subunits form a complex with Rag GTPase and v-ATPase, which sits on the cell’s lysosomes and detects the availability of amino acids. If the Ragulator complex receives signals for low amino acid count, it will start the process of catabolizing the cell. If there is an abundance of amino acids available to the cell, the Ragulator complex will signal that the cell can continue to grow. Ragulator proteins come in two different forms: Rag A/Rag B and Rag C/Rag D. These interact to form heterodimers with one another.

Lamtor2

Identifiers
- Symbol: 29796
- Alt. symbols: p14
- NCBI gene: 28956
- OMIM: 610389
- RefSeq: NM_014017.3
- UniProt: Q9Y2Q5

Other data
- Locus: Chr. 1 q22
Search for
- Structures: Swiss-model
- Domains: InterPro

Lamtor3

Identifiers
- Symbol: 15606
- Alt. symbols: MP1
- NCBI gene: 8649
- OMIM: 603296
- RefSeq: NM_021970.3
- UniProt: Q9UHA4

Other data
- Locus: Chr. 4 q23
Search for
- Structures: Swiss-model
- Domains: InterPro

Lamtor4

Identifiers
- Symbol: 33772
- Alt. symbols: c7orf59
- NCBI gene: 389541
- RefSeq: NM_001008395.3
- UniProt: Q0VGL1

Other data
- Locus: Chr. 7 q22.1
Search for
- Structures: Swiss-model
- Domains: InterPro

Lamtor5

Identifiers
- Symbol: 17955
- Alt. symbols: HBXIP
- NCBI gene: 10542
- OMIM: 608521
- RefSeq: NM_006402.2
- UniProt: O43504

Other data
- Locus: Chr. 1 p13.3
Search for
- Structures: Swiss-model
- Domains: InterPro

== Structure ==
Ragulator complex with Lamtor 1 in green, Lamtor 2 in blue, Lamtor 3 in red, Lamtor 4 in yellow, Lamtor 5 in purple. (PDB: 5Y39)

The complex consists of five subunits, named LAMTOR 1-5 (Late endosomal/lysosomal adaptor, mapk and mtor activator 1), however several have alternative names.

- LAMTOR1
- LAMTOR2
- LAMTOR3 (MAP2K1IP1)
- LAMTOR4
- LAMTOR5 (HBXIP)

== Function ==
While the intricate functions of the Ragulator-Rag Complex are not fully understood, it is known that the Ragulator-Rag Complex associates with the lysosome and plays a key role in mTOR (mammalian target of rapamycin) signaling regulation. mTOR signaling is sensitive to amino acid concentrations in the cytoplasm of the cell, and the Ragulator complex works to detect amino acid concentration and transmit signals that activate, or inhibit, mTORC1.

The Ragulator, along with the Rag GTPases and v-ATPases, are part of an amino acid identifying pathway, and are necessary for the localization of the mTORC1 to the lysosome surface. The Ragulator and v-ATPases reside on the lysosomal surface. The Rag GTPases cannot be directly bound to the lysosome because they lack the proteins necessary to bind to its lipid bilayer, so Rag GTPases must instead be anchored to the Ragulator. The Ragulator is bound to the surface via the V-ATPase. The Ragulator is a crystalized structure composed of five different subunits; LAMTOR 1, LAMTOR 2, LAMTOR 3, LAMTOR 4, LAMTOR 5. There are two sets of obligate heterodimers in the complex, LAMTOR 2/3, which sits right above LAMTOR 4/5. The LAMTOR 1 dimer does not have the same structure as the other subunits. LAMTOR 1 surrounds most of the two heterodimers, providing structural support and keeping the heterodimers in place. When amino acids are present, the subunits are folded and positioned in such a way that allows for the Rag-GTPases to be anchored to its primary docking site of LAMTOR 2/3 on the Ragulator. The Rag-GTPases consist of two sets of heterodimers; RAGs A/B and RAGs C/D. Before Rag-GTPases can bind to the Ragulator, Rag A/B must be GTP loaded via guanine nucleotide exchange factors (GEFs), and RAG C/D must be GDP loaded. Once Rag-GTPases are bound to the regulator complex, the mTORC1 can be translocated to the surface of the lysosome. At the lysosomal surface, the mTORC1 will then bind to Rheb, but only if Rheb was first loaded to a GTP via GEFs. If the amount of nutrients and the concentration of amino acids are sufficient, mTORC1 will be activated.

=== Activation of mTORC1 ===
The lysosomal membrane is the main area in which mTORC1 is activated. However, some activation can occur in the Golgi apparatus and the peroxisome. In mammalian cells, GTPase RagA and RagB are heterodimers with RagC and RagD, respectively. When enough amino acids are present, RagA/B GTPase becomes activated, which leads to the translocation of mTORC1 from the cytoplasm to the lysosome surface, via the Raptor. This process brings mTORC1 in close enough proximity to Rheb for Rheb to either (1) cause a conformational change to mTORC1, leading to and increase in substrate turnover, or (2) induce kinase activity of mTORC1. Rags do not contain membrane-targeting sequences, and as a result, depend on the entire Ragulator-Rag Complex to bind to the lysosome, activating mTORC1.

While most amino acids indirectly activate mTORC1 in mammals, Leucine has the ability to directly activate mTORC1 in cells that are depleted of amino acids. Yeast contain LRS (leucyltRNA synthetase), which is a molecule that can interact with Rags, directly activating the molecule.

== History ==
mTORC1 is a complex within the lysosome membrane that initiates growth when promoted by a stimulus, such as growth factors. A GTPase is a key component in cell signaling, and there were, in 2010, four RAG complexes discovered within the lysosomes of cells. In 2008, it was thought that these RAG complexes would slow down autophagy and activate cell growth by interacting with mTORC1. However, in 2010, the Ragulator was discovered. Researchers determined that the function of this Ragulator was to interact with the RAG A, B, C, and D complexes to promote cell growth. This discovery also led to the first use of the term “Rag-Ragulator” complex, because of the interaction between these two.

The amino acid level, cell growth, and other important factors are influenced by the mTOR Complex 1 pathway. On the lysosomal surface, the amino acids signal the activation of the four Rag proteins (RagA, RagB, RagC, and RagD) to translocate mTORC1 to the site of activation.

A 2014 study noted that AMPK (AMP-activated protein kinase) and mTOR play important roles in managing different metabolic programs. It was also found that the protein complex v-ATPase-Ragulator was essential for activation of mTOR and AMPK. The v-ATPase-Ragulator complex is also used as an initiating sensor for energy stress, and serves as an endosomal docking site for LKB1-mediated AMPK activation by forming the v-ATPase-Ragulator-AXIN/LKB1-AMPK complex. This allows a switch between catabolism and anabolism.

In 2016, it was established that RagA and Lamtor4 were key to microglia functioning and biogenesis regulation within the lysosome. Further studies also indicate that the Ragulator-Rag complex interacts with proteins other than mTORC1, including an interaction with v-ATPase, which facilitates functions within microglia of the lysosome.

In 2017, the Ragulator was thought to regulate the position of the lysosome, and interact with BORC, a multi subunit complex located on the surface of the lysosomal membrane. Both BORC and mTORC1 work together in activating the GTPases to change the position of the lysosome. It was concluded that BORC and GTPases compete for a binding site in the LAMTOR 2 protein to reposition the lysosome.
