= MTORC1 =

Protein complex

mTOR
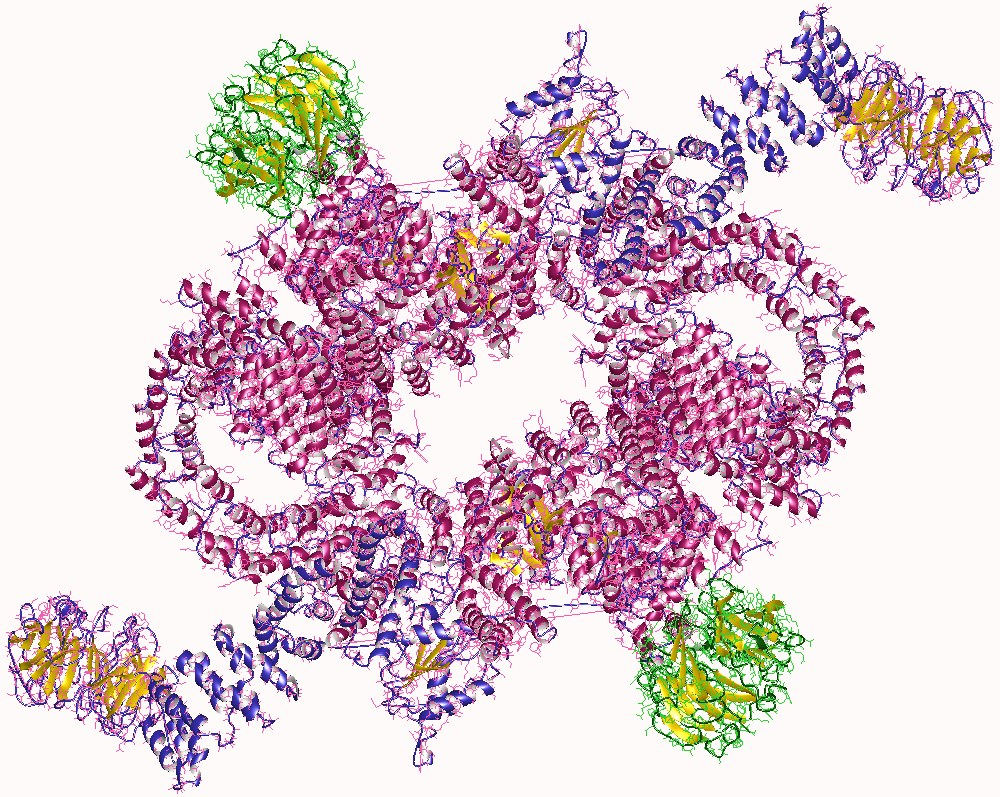
- mTORC1 heteromer, Human

Identifiers
- Symbol: MTOR
- Alt. symbols: FRAP, FRAP2, FRAP1
- NCBI gene: 2475
- HGNC: 3942
- OMIM: 601231
- RefSeq: NM_004958
- UniProt: P42345

Other data
- EC number: 2.7.11.1
- Locus: Chr. 1 p36
Search for
- Structures: Swiss-model
- Domains: InterPro

RPTOR

Identifiers
- Symbol: RPTOR
- Alt. symbols: KOG1, Mip1
- NCBI gene: 57521
- HGNC: 30287
- OMIM: 607130
- RefSeq: NM_001163034.1
- UniProt: Q8N122

Other data
- Locus: Chr. 17 q25.3
Search for
- Structures: Swiss-model
- Domains: InterPro

mTORC1, also known as mammalian target of rapamycin complex 1 or mechanistic target of rapamycin complex 1, is a protein kinase complex that functions as a nutrient/energy/redox sensor and controls protein synthesis.

mTOR Complex 1 (mTORC1) is composed of the mTOR protein complex, regulatory-associated protein of mTOR (commonly known as raptor), mammalian lethal with SEC13 protein 8 (MLST8), PRAS40 and DEPTOR. This complex embodies the classic functions of mTOR, namely as a nutrient/energy/redox sensor and controller of protein synthesis. The activity of this complex is regulated by rapamycin, insulin, growth factors, phosphatidic acid, certain amino acids and their derivatives (e.g., L-leucine and β-hydroxy β-methylbutyric acid), mechanical stimuli, and oxidative stress. Recently it has been also demonstrated that cellular bicarbonate metabolism can be regulated by mTORC1 signaling.

The role of mTORC1 is to activate translation of proteins. In order for cells to grow and proliferate by manufacturing more proteins, the cells must ensure that they have the resources available for protein production. Thus, for protein production, and therefore mTORC1 activation, cells must have adequate energy resources, nutrient availability, oxygen abundance, and proper growth factors in order for mRNA translation to begin.

== Activation at the lysosome ==
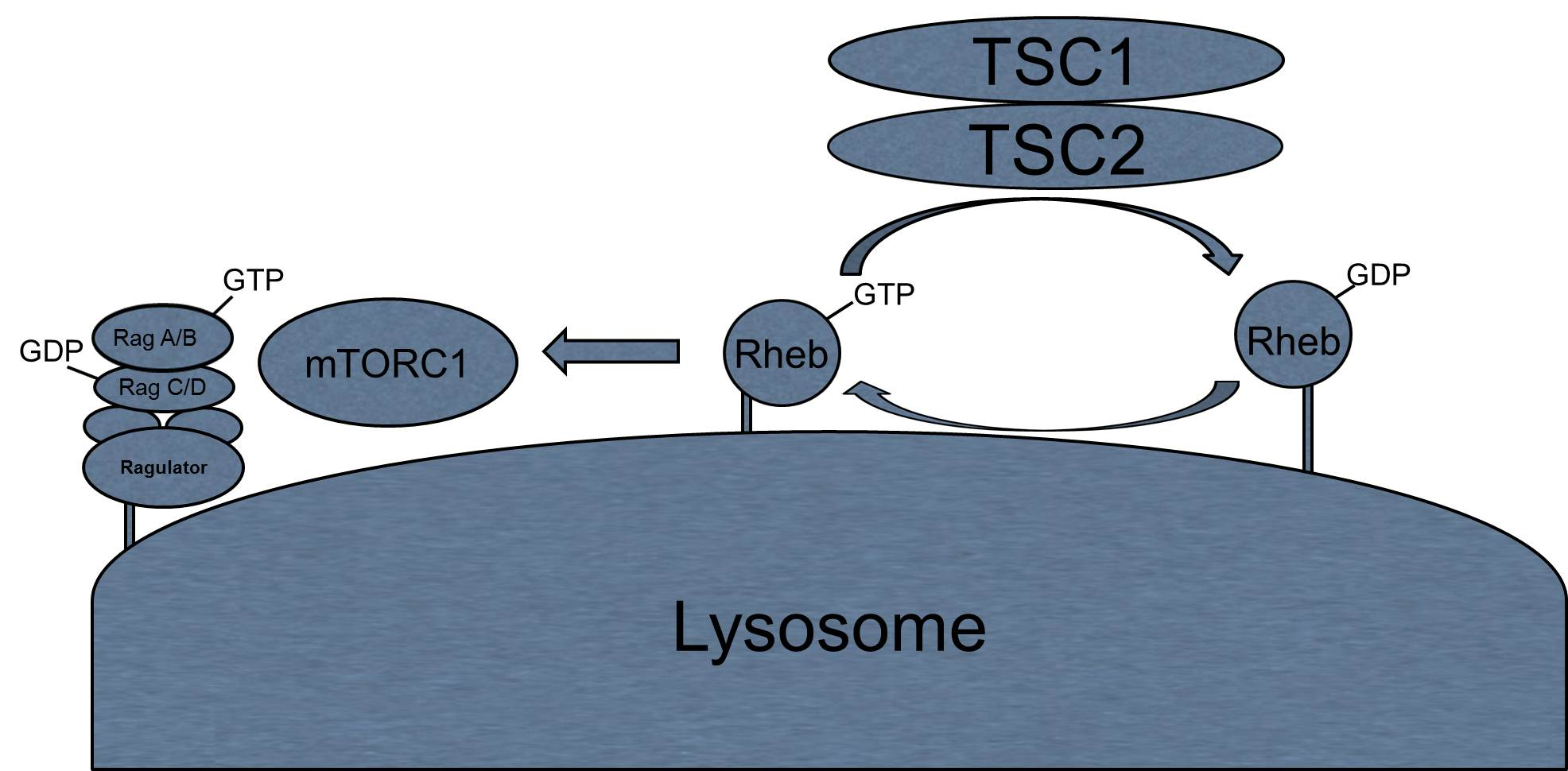
Activation of mTORC1 at the lysosome.

=== TSC complex ===
Almost all of the variables required for protein synthesis affect mTORC1 activation by interacting with the TSC1/TSC2 protein complex. TSC2 is a GTPase activating protein (GAP). Its GAP activity interacts with a G protein called Rheb by hydrolyzing the GTP of the active Rheb-GTP complex, converting it to the inactive Rheb-GDP complex. The active Rheb-GTP activates mTORC1 through unelucidated pathways. Thus, many of the pathways that influence mTORC1 activation do so through the activation or inactivation of the TSC1/TSC2 heterodimer. This control is usually performed through phosphorylation of the complex. This phosphorylation can cause the dimer to dissociate and lose its GAP activity, or the phosphorylation can cause the heterodimer to have increased GAP activity, depending on which amino acid residue becomes phosphorylated. Thus, the signals that influence mTORC1 activity do so through activation or inactivation of the TSC1/TSC2 complex, upstream of mTORC1.

=== Ragulator-rag complex ===
mTORC1 interacts at the Ragulator-Rag complex on the surface of the lysosome in response to amino acid levels in the cell. Even if a cell has the proper energy for protein synthesis, if it does not have the amino acid building blocks for proteins, no protein synthesis will occur. Studies have shown that depriving amino acid levels inhibits mTORC1 signaling to the point where both energy abundance and amino acids are necessary for mTORC1 to function. When amino acids are introduced to a deprived cell, the presence of amino acids causes Rag GTPase heterodimers to switch to their active conformation. Active Rag heterodimers interact with raptor, localizing mTORC1 to the surface of late endosomes and lysosomes where the Rheb-GTP is located. This allows mTORC1 to physically interact with Rheb. Thus the amino acid pathway as well as the growth factor/energy pathway converge on endosomes and lysosomes. Thus the Ragulator-Rag complex recruits mTORC1 to lysosomes to interact with Rheb.

==== Regulation of the ragulator-rag complex ====
Rag activity is regulated by at least two highly conserved complexes: the "GATOR1" complex containing DEPDC5, NPRL2 and NPRL3 and the ""GATOR2" complex containing Mios, WDR24, WDR59, Seh1L, Sec13. GATOR1 inhibits Rags (it is a GTPase-activating protein for Rag subunits A/B) and GATOR2 activates Rags by inhibiting DEPDC5.

== Upstream signaling ==
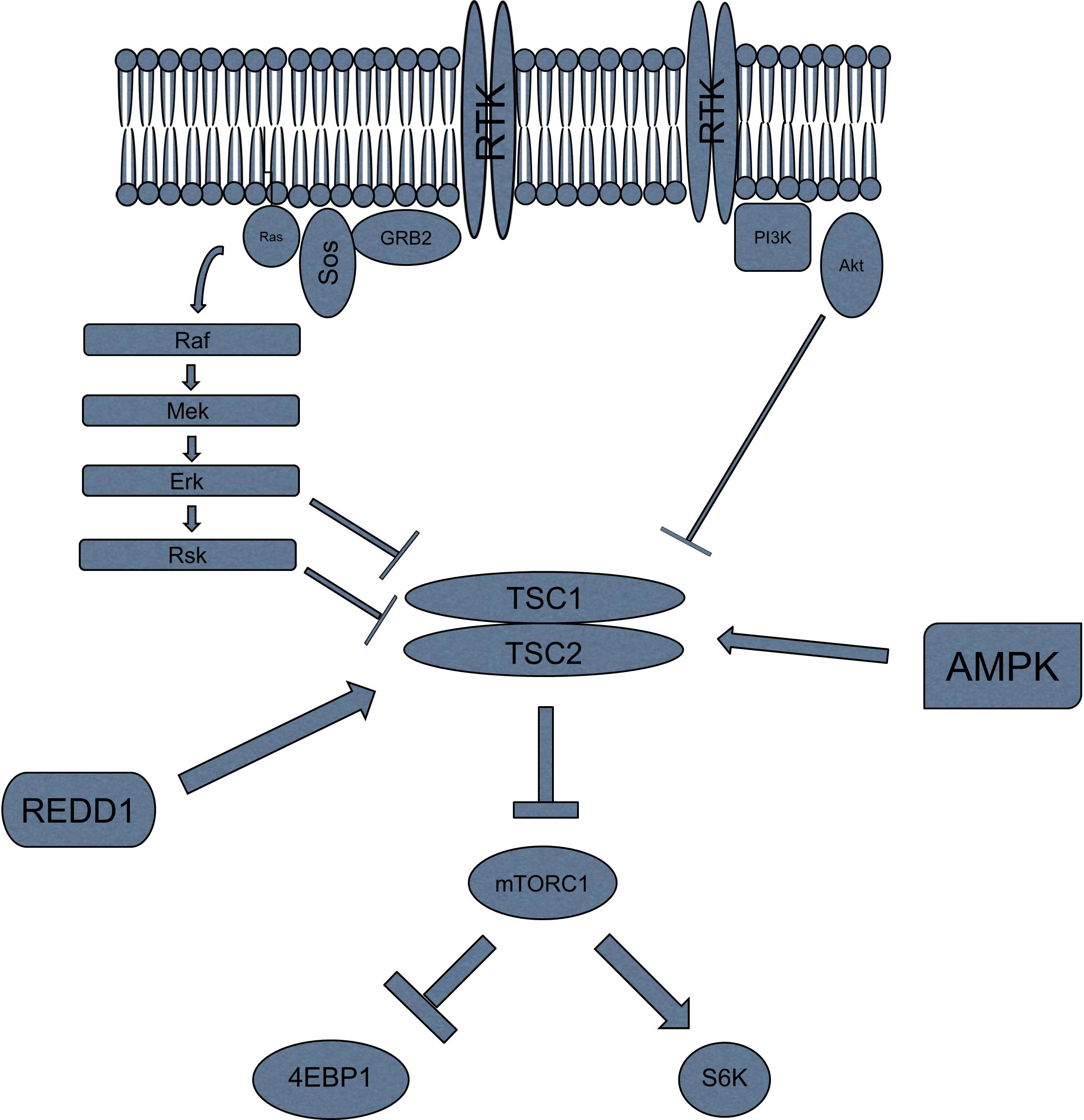
The General mTORC1 Pathway.

=== Receptor tyrosine kinases ===
==== Akt/pkb pathway ====
Insulin-like growth factors can activate mTORC1 through the receptor tyrosine kinase (RTK)-Akt/PKB signaling pathway. Ultimately, Akt phosphorylates TSC2 on serine residue 939, serine residue 981, and threonine residue 1462. These phosphorylated sites will recruit the cytosolic anchoring protein 14-3-3 to TSC2, disrupting the TSC1/TSC2 dimer. When TSC2 is not associated with TSC1, TSC2 loses its GAP activity and can no longer hydrolyze Rheb-GTP. This results in continued activation of mTORC1, allowing for protein synthesis via insulin signaling.

Akt will also phosphorylate PRAS40, causing it to fall off of the Raptor protein located on mTORC1. Since PRAS40 prevents Raptor from recruiting mTORC1's substrates 4E-BP1 and S6K1, its removal will allow the two substrates to be recruited to mTORC1 and thereby activated in this way.

Furthermore, since insulin is a factor that is secreted by pancreatic beta cells upon glucose elevation in the blood, its signaling ensures that there is energy for protein synthesis to take place. In a negative feedback loop on mTORC1 signaling, S6K1 is able to phosphorylate the insulin receptor and inhibit its sensitivity to insulin. This has great significance in diabetes mellitus, which is due to insulin resistance.

==== MAPK/ERK pathway ====
Mitogens, such as insulin like growth factor 1 (IGF1), can activate the MAPK/ERK pathway, which can inhibit the TSC1/TSC2 complex, activating mTORC1. In this pathway, the G protein Ras is tethered to the plasma membrane via a farnesyl group and is in its inactive GDP state. Upon growth factor binding to the adjacent receptor tyrosine kinase, the adaptor protein GRB2 binds with its SH2 domains. This recruits the GEF called Sos, which activates the Ras G protein. Ras activates Raf (MAPKKK), which activates Mek (MAPKK), which activates Erk (MAPK). Erk can go on to activate RSK. Erk will phosphorylate the serine residue 644 on TSC2, while RSK will phosphorylate serine residue 1798 on TSC2. These phosphorylations will cause the heterodimer to fall apart, and prevent it from deactivating Rheb, which keeps mTORC1 active.

RSK has also been shown to phosphorylate raptor, which helps it overcome the inhibitory effects of PRAS40.

==== JNK pathway ====
c-Jun N-terminal kinase (JNK) signaling is part of the mitogen-activated protein kinase (MAPK) signaling pathway essential in stress signaling pathways relating to gene expression, neuronal development, and cell survival. Recent studies have shown there is a direct molecular interaction where JNK phosphorylates Raptor at Ser-696, Thr-706, and Ser-863. Therefore, mTORC1 activity is JNK-dependent. Thus, JNK activation plays a role in protein synthesis via subsequent downstream effectors of mTORC1 such as S6 kinase and eIFs.

=== Wnt pathway ===
The Wnt pathway is responsible for cellular growth and proliferation during organismal development; thus, it could be reasoned that activation of this pathway also activates mTORC1. Activation of the Wnt pathway inhibits glycogen synthase kinase 3 beta (GSK3B). When the Wnt pathway is not active, GSK3B is able to phosphorylate TSC2 on Ser1341 and Ser1337 in conjunction with AMPK phosphorylation of Ser1345. It has been reported that the AMPK is required to first phosphorylate Ser1345 before GSK3B can phosphorylate its target serine residues. This phosphorylation of TSC2 would activate this complex, if GSK3B were active. Since the Wnt pathway inhibits GSK3 signaling, the active Wnt pathway is also involved in the mTORC1 pathway. Thus, mTORC1 can activate protein synthesis for the developing organism.

=== Cytokines ===
Cytokines like tumor necrosis factor alpha (TNF-alpha) can induce mTOR activity through IKK beta, also known as IKK2. IKK beta can phosphorylate TSC1 at serine residue 487 and TSC1 at serine residue 511. This causes the heterodimer TSC complex to fall apart, keeping Rheb in its active GTP-bound state.

=== Energy and oxygen ===
==== Energy status ====
In order for translation to take place, abundant sources of energy, particularly in the form of ATP, need to be present. If these levels of ATP are not present, due to its hydrolysis into other forms like AMP, and the ratio of AMP to ATP molecules gets too high, AMPK will become activated. AMPK will go on to inhibit energy consuming pathways such as protein synthesis.

AMPK can phosphorylate TSC2 on serine residue 1387, which activates the GAP activity of this complex, causing Rheb-GTP to be hydrolyzed into Rheb-GDP. This inactivates mTORC1 and blocks protein synthesis through this pathway.

AMPK can also phosphorylate Raptor on two serine residues. This phosphorylated Raptor recruits 14-3-3 to bind to it and prevents Raptor from being part of the mTORC1 complex. Since mTORC1 cannot recruit its substrates without Raptor, no protein synthesis via mTORC1 occurs.

LKB1, also known as STK11, is a known tumor suppressor that can activate AMPK. More studies on this aspect of mTORC1 may help shed light on its strong link to cancer.

==== Hypoxic stress ====
When oxygen levels in the cell are low, it will limit its energy expenditure through the inhibition of protein synthesis. Under hypoxic conditions, hypoxia inducible factor one alpha (HIF1A) will stabilize and activate transcription of REDD1, also known as DDIT4. After translation, this REDD1 protein will bind to TSC2, which prevents 14-3-3 from inhibiting the TSC complex. Thus, TSC retains its GAP activity towards Rheb, causing Rheb to remain bound to GDP and mTORC1 to be inactive.

Due to the lack of synthesis of ATP in the mitochondria under hypoxic stress or hypoxia, AMPK will also become active and thus inhibit mTORC1 through its processes.

== Downstream signaling ==
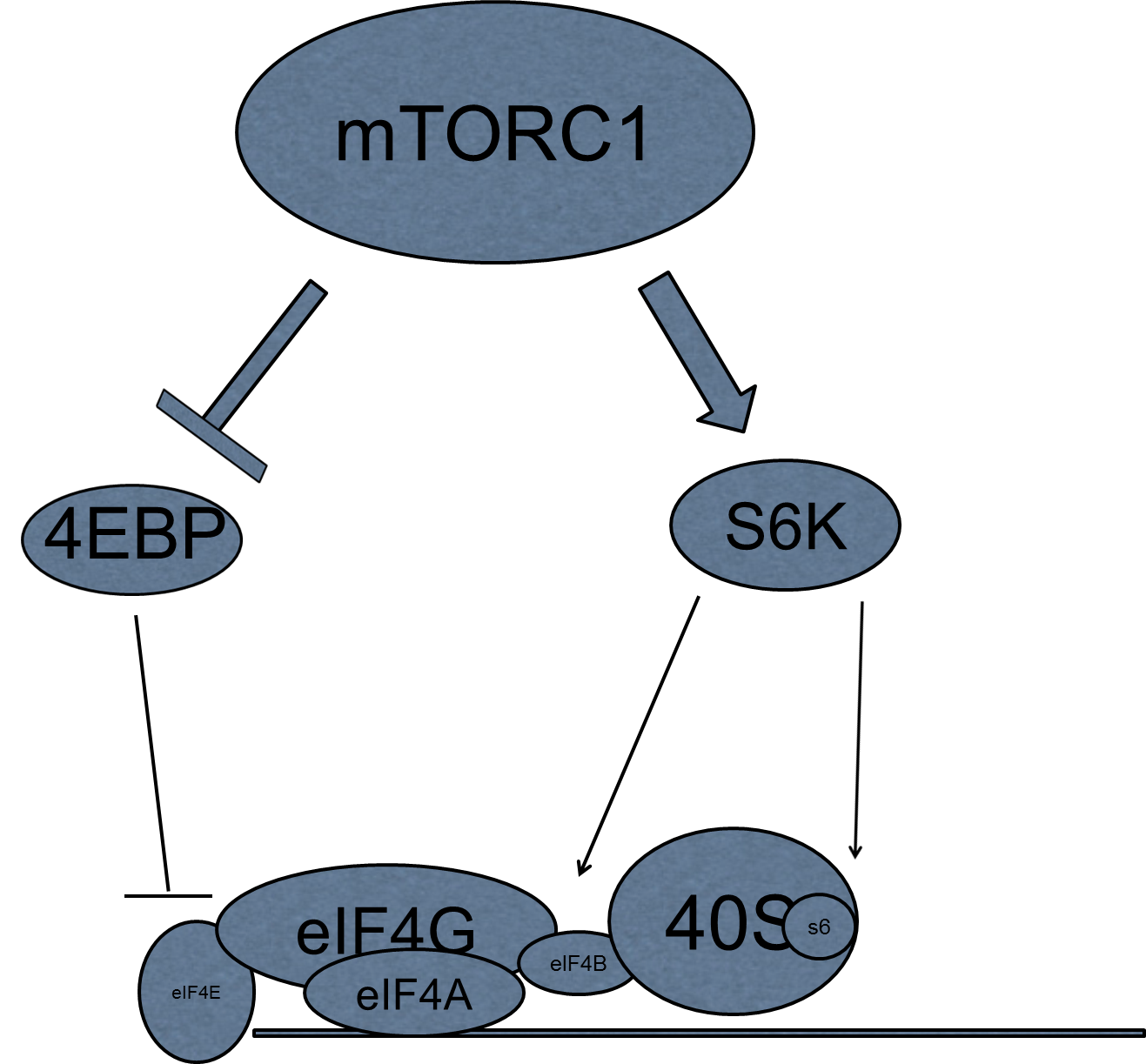
Receptor Tyrosine Kinases and mTORC1.

mTORC1 activates transcription and translation through its interactions with p70-S6 Kinase 1 (S6K1) and 4E-BP1, the eukaryotic initiation factor 4E (eIF4E) binding protein 1, primarily via phosphorylation and dephosphorylation of its downstream targets. S6K1 and 4E-BP1 modulate translation in eukaryotic cells. Their signaling will converge at the translation initiation complex on the 5' end of mRNA, and thus activate translation.

=== 4E-BP1 ===
Activated mTORC1 will phosphorylate translation repressor protein 4E-BP1, thereby releasing it from eukaryotic translation initiation factor 4E (eIF4E). eIF4E is now free to join the eukaryotic translation initiation factor 4G (eIF4G) and the eukaryotic translation initiation factor 4A (eIF4A). This complex then binds to the 5' cap of mRNA and will recruit the helicase eukaryotic translation initiation factor A (eIF4A) and its cofactor eukaryotic translation initiation factor 4B (eIF4B). The helicase is required to remove hairpin loops that arise in the 5' untranslated regions of mRNA, which prevent premature translation of proteins. Once the initiation complex is assembled at the 5' cap of mRNA, it will recruit the 40S small ribosomal subunit that is now capable of scanning for the AUG start codon start site, because the hairpin loop has been degraded by the eIF4A helicase. Once the ribosome reaches the AUG codon, translation can begin.

=== S6k ===
Previous studies suggest that S6K signaling is mediated by mTOR in a rapamycin-dependent manner wherein S6K is displaced from the eIF3 complex upon binding of mTOR with eIF3. Hypophosphorylated S6K is located on the eIF3 scaffold complex. Active mTORC1 gets recruited to the scaffold, and once there, will phosphorylate S6K to make it active.

mTORC1 phosphorylates S6K1 on at least two residues, with the most critical modification occurring on a threonine residue (T389). This event stimulates the subsequent phosphorylation of S6K1 by PDPK1. Active S6K1 can in turn stimulate the initiation of protein synthesis through activation of S6 Ribosomal protein (a component of the ribosome) and eIF4B, causing them to be recruited to the pre-initiation complex.

Active S6K can bind to the SKAR scaffold protein that can get recruited to exon junction complexes (EJC). Exon junction complexes span the mRNA region where two exons come together after an intron has been spliced out. Once S6K binds to this complex, increased translation on these mRNA regions occurs.

S6K1 can also participate in a positive feedback loop with mTORC1 by phosphorylating mTOR's negative regulatory domain at two sites thr-2446 and ser-2448; phosphorylation at these sites appears to stimulate mTOR activity.

S6K also can phosphorylate programmed cell death 4 (PDCD4), which marks it for degradation by ubiquitin ligase Beta-TrCP (BTRC). PDCD4 is a tumor suppressor that binds to eIF4A and prevents it from being incorporated into the initiation complex.

== Role in disease and aging ==
mTOR was reported to be related to aging in 2001 when the ortholog of S6K, SCH9, was deleted in S. cerevisiae, doubling its lifespan. This greatly increased the interest in upstream signaling and mTORC1. Studies in inhibiting mTORC1 on the model organisms of C. elegans, fruitflies, and mice significantly increased lifespans in all of them. Disrupting the gut microbiota of infant mice was reported to lead to reduced longevity with mTORC1 implicated as a potential mechanism.

A relationship between food consumption and mTORC1 activity has been reported. Carbohydrate consumption activates mTORC1 through the insulin growth factor pathway. Amino acid consumption stimulates mTORC1 through the branched chain amino acid/Rag pathway. Dietary restriction inhibits mTORC1 signaling through both upstream pathways of mTORC that converge on the lysosome.

=== Autophagy ===
Autophagy is the major degradation pathway in eukaryotic cells and is essential for the removal of damaged organelles via macroautophagy or proteins and smaller cellular debris via microautophagy from the cytoplasm. Thus, autophagy is a way for the cell to recycle old and damaged materials by breaking them down, allowing for the resynthesis of newer, healthier cellular structures.

Upon activation, mTORC1 phosphorylates autophagy-related protein 13 (Atg 13), preventing it from entering the ULK1 kinase complex, which consists of Atg1, Atg17, and Atg101. This prevents the structure from entering the preautophagosomal structure at the plasma membrane, which inhibits autophagy.

mTORC1's ability to inhibit autophagy while at the same time stimulating protein synthesis and cell growth can result in accumulations of damaged proteins and organelles. Because autophagy appears to decline with age, activation of autophagy may promote longevity in humans. Autophagy problems are associated with diabetes, cardiovascular disease, neurodegenerative diseases, and cancer.

=== Lysosomal damage ===
mTORC1 is positioned on lysosomes and is inhibited when lysosomal membrane is damaged through protein complex GALTOR. GALTOR contains galectin-8, a cytosolic lectin, that recognizes damaged lysosomal membranes by binding to the exposed glycoconjugates normally facing lysosomal lumen. Under homeostatic conditions, Galectin-8 associates with active mTOR. Following membrane damage, galectin-8 switches from mTOR to complexes containing SLC38A9, RRAGA/RRAGB, and LAMTOR1 (a component of Ragulator) thus inhibiting mTOR. mTOR inhibition in turn activates autophagy and starts a quality program that removes damaged lysosomes, referred to as lysophagy,

=== Reactive oxygen species ===
Reactive oxygen species (ROS) can damage DNA and protein. A majority of them arise in the mitochondria.

Deletion of the TOR1 gene in yeast increases cellular respiration in the mitochondria by enhancing the translation of mitochondrial DNA that encodes for complexes involved in the electron transport chain. When this electron transport chain is not as efficient, the unreduced oxygen molecules in the mitochondrial cortex may accumulate and begin to produce ROS. Cancer cells as well as those with greater levels of mTORC1 both rely more on glycolysis in the cytosol for ATP production rather than through oxidative phosphorylation in the inner membrane of the mitochondria.

Inhibition of mTORC1 was reported to increase transcription of NFE2L2 (NRF2) gene, which is a transcription factor that regulates the expression of electrophilic response elements and antioxidants in response to increased ROS levels.

AMPK-induced eNOS was reported to regulate mTORC1 in endothelium. Unlike the other cell type in endothelium, eNOS induced mTORC1. This pathway is required for mitochondrial biogenesis.

=== Stem cells ===
Conservation of stem cells was reported to help prevent against premature aging. mTORC1 activity plays a critical role in the growth and proliferation of stem cells. Knocking out mTORC1 results in embryonic lethality due to lack of trophoblast development. Treating stem cells with rapamycin slows their proliferation, conserving stem cells in an undifferentiated condition.

mTORC1 plays a role in the differentiation and proliferation of hematopoietic stem cells (HSC). Its upregulation was reported to cause premature HSC aging. Conversely, inhibiting mTOR restores and regenerates them. The mechanisms of mTORC1's inhibition of HSCs has yet to be fully elucidated.

Rapamycin is used clinically as an immunosuppressant and prevents the proliferation of T cells and B cells. Paradoxically, even though rapamycin is a federally approved immunosuppressant, its inhibition of mTORC1 results in better quantity and quality of functional memory T cells. mTORC1 inhibition with rapamycin improves the ability of naïve T cells to become precursor memory T cells during the expansion phase of T cell development. This inhibition increases the quality of these memory T cells that become mature T cells during the contraction phase of their development. mTORC1 inhibition with rapamycin is associatedto a dramatic increase of B cells in old mice, enhancing their immune systems. This paradox of rapamycin inhibiting the immune system response has several parts, including its interaction with regulatory T cells.

=== Muscle damage ===
MTORC1 plays a role maintaining muscle function during aging, when activity supplies protein to muscles, but without removing damaged proteins, which compromises muscle functions. Transcription factor DEAF1 is a gene that drives this dysregulation, switching on overactivity in the mTORC1 system and disrupting the protein exchange that functions normally in younger tissue. The gene's activity is managed by regulatory proteins known as FOXOs – which, unsurprisingly, lose the ability to properly keep the gene in check, as we get older. So instead of a smoothly operating system that repairs and strengthens tissue, it actually ends up accelerating muscle loss.

== Biomolecular target ==
=== Activators ===
Resistance exercise, the amino acid L-leucine, and beta-hydroxy beta-methylbutyric acid (HMB) are known to induce signaling cascades in skeletal muscle cells that result in mTOR phosphorylation, the activation of mTORC1, and subsequently the initiation of myofibrillar protein synthesis (i.e., the production of proteins such as myosin, titin, and actin), thereby facilitating muscle hypertrophy.

The NMDA receptor antagonist ketamine has been reported to activate the mTORC1 pathway in the medial prefrontal cortex (mPFC) of the brain as an essential downstream mechanism in the mediation of its rapid-acting antidepressant effects. NV-5138 is a ligand and modulator of sestrin2, a leucine amino acid sensor and upstream regulatory pathway of mTORC1, and is under development for the treatment of depression. The drug has been reported to directly and selectively activate the mTORC1 pathway, including in the mPFC, and to produce rapid-acting antidepressant effects similar to those of ketamine.

=== Inhibitors ===
There have been several dietary compounds that have been suggested to inhibit mTORC1 signaling including EGCG, resveratrol, curcumin, caffeine, and alcohol.

==== First generation drugs ====
Rapamycin was the first known inhibitor of mTORC1, considering that mTORC1 was discovered as being the target of rapamycin. Rapamycin will bind to cytosolic FKBP12 and act as a scaffold molecule, allowing this protein to dock on the FRB regulatory region (FKBP12-Rapamycin Binding region/domain) on mTORC1. The binding of the FKBP12-rapamycin complex to the FRB regulatory region inhibits mTORC1 through processes not yet known. mTORC2 is also inhibited by rapamycin in some cell culture lines and tissues, particularly those that express high levels of FKBP12 and low levels of FKBP51.

Rapamycin itself is not very water soluble and is not very stable, so scientists developed rapamycin analogs, called rapalogs, to overcome these two problems with rapamycin. These drugs are considered the first generation inhibitors of mTOR. These other inhibitors include everolimus and temsirolimus. Compared with the parent compound rapamycin, everolimus is more selective for the mTORC1 protein complex, with little impact on the mTORC2 complex. mTORC1 inhibition by everolimus was reported to normalize tumor blood vessels, to increase tumor-infiltrating lymphocytes, and to improve adoptive cell transfer therapy.

Sirolimus, which is the drug name for rapamycin, was approved by the U.S. Food and Drug Administration (FDA) in 1999 to prevent against transplant rejection in patients undergoing kidney transplantation. In 2003, it was approved as a stent covering for widening arteries to prevent against future heart attacks. In 2007, mTORC1 inhibitors began being approved for treatments against cancers such as renal cell carcinoma. In 2008 they were approved for treatment of mantle cell lymphoma. mTORC1 inhibitors have recently been approved for treatment of pancreatic cancer. In 2010 they were approved for treatment of tuberous sclerosis.

==== Second generation drugs ====
The second generation of inhibitors were created to overcome problems with upstream signaling upon the introduction of first generation inhibitors to the treated cells. One problem with the first generation inhibitors of mTORC1 is that there is a negative feedback loop from phosphorylated S6K, that can inhibit the insulin RTK via phosphorylation. When this negative feedback loop is no longer there, the upstream regulators of mTORC1 become more active than they would otherwise would have been under normal mTORC1 activity. Another problem is that since mTORC2 is resistant to rapamycin, and it too acts upstream of mTORC1 by activating Akt. Thus signaling upstream of mTORC1 still remains very active upon its inhibition via rapamycin and the rapalogs. Rapamycin and its analogues also have procoagulant side effects caused by off-target binding of the activated immunophilin FKBP12, which are not produced by structurally unrelated inhibitors of mTORC such as gedatolisib, WYE-687 and XL-388.

Second generation inhibitors are able to bind to the ATP-binding motif on the kinase domain of the mTOR core protein itself and abolish activity of both mTOR complexes. In addition, since the mTOR and the PI3K proteins are both in the same phosphatidylinositol 3-kinase-related kinase (PIKK) family of kinases, some second generation inhibitors have dual inhibition towards the mTOR complexes as well as PI3K, which acts upstream of mTORC1. As of 2011, these second generation inhibitors were in phase II of clinical trials.

==== Third generation drugs ====
The third generation of inhibitors were created following the realization that many of the side effects of rapamycin and rapamycin analogs were mediated not as a result of direct inhibition of mTORC1, but as a consequence of off-target inhibition of mTORC2. Rapamycin analogs such as DL001, that are more selective for mTORC1 than sirolimus, have been developed and in mice have reduced side effects. mTORC1 inhibitors that have novel mechanisms of action, for example peptides like PRAS40 and small molecules like HY-124798 (Rheb inhibitor NR1), which inhibit the interaction of mTORC1 with its endogenous activator Rheb, are also being developed. Some glucose transporter inhibitors such as NV-5440 and NV-6297 are also selective inhibitors of mTORC1

There have been over 1,300 clinical trials conducted with mTOR inhibitors since 1970.
