= PA26 =

PA26 may refer to:

- Pennsylvania Route 26
- Pennsylvania's 26th congressional district
- SESN1, a protein
