= HY-124798 =

Chemical compound

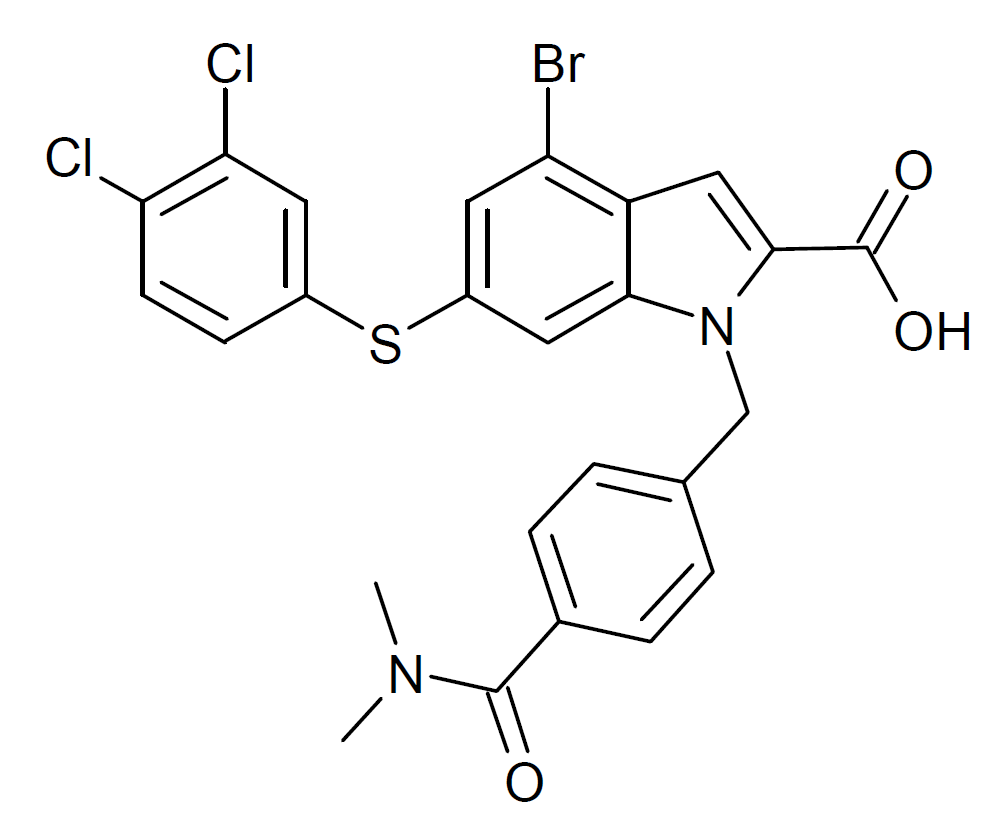

Identifiers
- IUPAC name: 4-bromo-6-(3,4-dichlorophenyl)sulfanyl-1-[[4-(dimethylcarbamoyl)phenyl]methyl]indole-2-carboxylic acid
- CAS Number: 2216763-38-9
- PubChem CID: 132281917
- ChemSpider: 84442919
- UNII: N6P39EU2QU
- ChEMBL: ChEMBL6008369
- CompTox Dashboard (EPA): DTXSID201336670

Chemical and physical data
- Formula: C_{25}H_{19}BrCl_{2}N_{2}O_{3}S
- Molar mass: 578.30 g·mol^{−1}
- 3D model (JSmol): Interactive image
- SMILES: CN(C)C(=O)C1=CC=C(C=C1)CN2C(=CC3=C2C=C(C=C3Br)SC4=CC(=C(C=C4)Cl)Cl)C(=O)O
- InChI: InChI=1S/C25H19BrCl2N2O3S/c1-29(2)24(31)15-5-3-14(4-6-15)13-30-22-11-17(34-16-7-8-20(27)21(28)10-16)9-19(26)18(22)12-23(30)25(32)33/h3-12H,13H2,1-2H3,(H,32,33); Key:MJYFVDNMTKLGTH-UHFFFAOYSA-N

HY-124798 (Rheb inhibitor NR1) is the first compound to be developed that acts as a potent and selective inhibitor of Rheb, a GTP-binding protein which acts as an endogenous activator of the mechanistic target of rapamycin (mTOR) subtype mTORC1. Since many of the side effects of rapamycin and its analogues are thought to result from binding to the other subtype mTORC2, it is hoped that selective inhibition of mTORC1 should have a more selective effects profile. As mTORC1 and mTORC2 have binding sites that are very similar in structure, it has been challenging to develop highly subtype selective inhibitors, making indirect inhibition via modulation of other messenger proteins such as Rheb an attractive approach. However, since HY-124798 has a relatively weak IC_{50} of 2.1μM, and Rheb also has other targets in addition to mTORC1, it remains to be established whether it will deliver the hoped for improvements in pharmacological profile.

== See also ==
- MB-3 (drug)
