= MB-3 =

MB-3 may refer to:

- MB-3 (drug), an enzyme inhibitor
- Thomas-Morse MB-3, a biplane from the 1920s
- Martin-Baker MB 3, an experimental WWII aircraft
- Bernardini MB-3 Tamoyo, a Brazilian tank project
- Brügger MB-3, a small sports aircraft
- MB 3, a dwarf spheroidal galaxy
