= NV-5440 =

Chemical compound

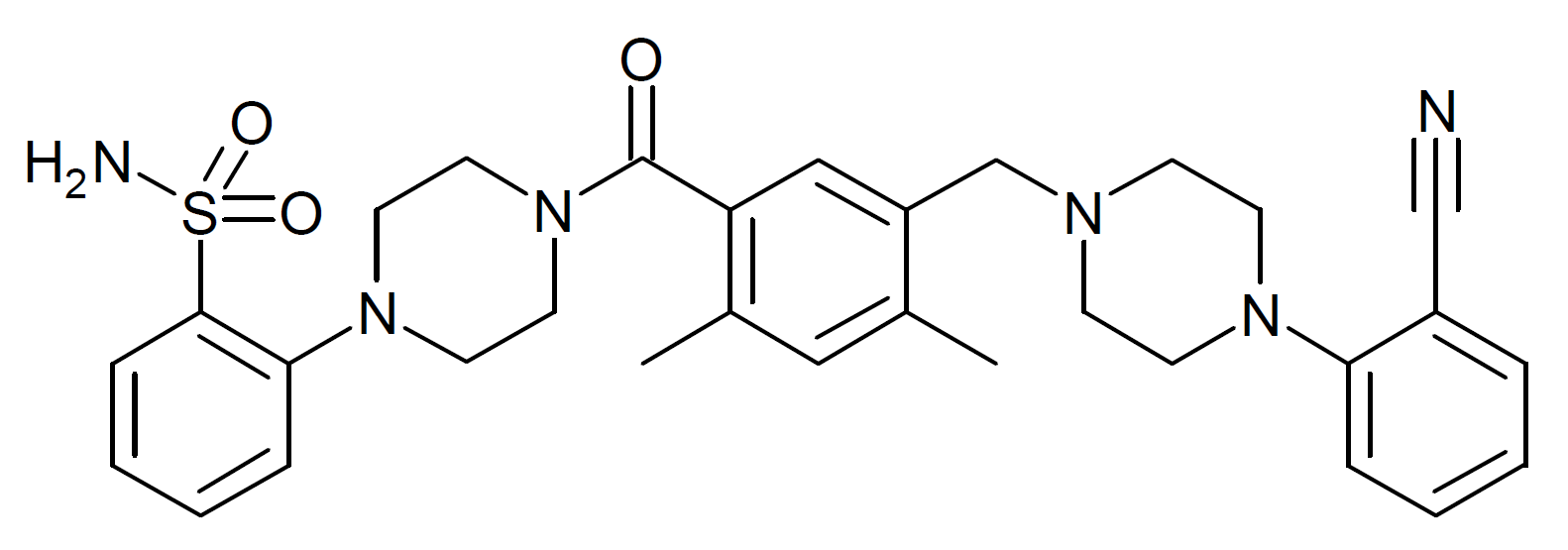

Identifiers
- IUPAC name: 2-[4-[5-[[4-(2-cyanophenyl)piperazin-1-yl]methyl]-2,4-dimethylbenzoyl]piperazin-1-yl]benzenesulfonamide
- CAS Number: 2226614-88-4
- PubChem CID: 134500648
- ChemSpider: 98644474
- CompTox Dashboard (EPA): DTXSID201336668

Chemical and physical data
- Formula: C_{31}H_{36}N_{6}O_{3}S
- Molar mass: 572.73 g·mol^{−1}
- 3D model (JSmol): Interactive image
- SMILES: CC1=CC(=C(C=C1CN2CCN(CC2)C3=CC=CC=C3C#N)C(=O)N4CCN(CC4)C5=CC=CC=C5S(=O)(=O)N)C
- InChI: InChI=1S/C31H36N6O3S/c1-23-19-24(2)27(20-26(23)22-34-11-13-35(14-12-34)28-8-4-3-7-25(28)21-32)31(38)37-17-15-36(16-18-37)29-9-5-6-10-30(29)41(33,39)40/h3-10,19-20H,11-18,22H2,1-2H3,(H2,33,39,40); Key:BREWSTIKWAQLCH-UHFFFAOYSA-N

NV-5440 is a drug which acts as both a non-specific inhibitor of the glucose transporters and also a selective inhibitor of mTORC1, with no significant action at the related mTORC2 subtype. Compounds of this type have potential application in the treatment of cancer, and it is also used for research into the links between calorie restriction and longevity.
