= Mefluleucine =

Chemical compound

Clinical data
- Routes of administration: By mouth
- Drug class: Sestrin2 modulator; mTORC1 activator

Identifiers
- IUPAC name: (2S)-2-amino-5,5-difluoro-4,4-dimethylpentanoic acid
- CAS Number: 2095886-80-7
- PubChem CID: 129050791
- DrugBank: DB19180
- ChemSpider: 65568226
- UNII: 06CA9QMG6Z
- CompTox Dashboard (EPA): DTXSID301336354

Chemical and physical data
- Formula: C_{7}H_{13}F_{2}NO_{2}
- Molar mass: 181.183 g·mol^{−1}
- 3D model (JSmol): Interactive image
- SMILES: CC(C)(CC(C(=O)O)N)C(F)F
- InChI: InChI=1S/C7H13F2NO2/c1-7(2,6(8)9)3-4(10)5(11)12/h4,6H,3,10H2,1-2H3,(H,11,12)/t4-/m0/s1; Key:HRFIMCJTDKEPPV-BYPYZUCNSA-N

Mefluleucine (INN; developmental code names NV-5138, SPN-820) is an investigational new drug that is being evaluated by Navitor Pharmaceuticals and Supernus Pharmaceuticals for the treatment of major depressive disorder (MDD).

Mefluleucine is an analogue of the amino acid leucine and works by binding to and modulating sestrin2, a cellular sensor protein for leucine, which is a natural activator of mammalian target of rapamycin complex 1 (mTORC1) signaling pathway. The mTORC1 pathway is the same signaling pathway that the NMDA receptor antagonist ketamine activates in the medial prefrontal cortex (mPFC) and which may mediate its rapid-acting antidepressant effects.

== Pharmacology ==
Mefluleucine has been found to increase mTORC1 signaling within physiologic range and to stimulate synaptogenesis in the mPFC, and further to induce rapid antidepressant effects in multiple animal models of depression. Like those of ketamine, these actions were demonstrated to require the signaling of brain-derived neurotrophic factor (BDNF). The antidepressant effects following a single dose of mefluleucine are long-lasting, with a duration of up to 7 days, and are similar to those of ketamine.

== Clinical trials ==
Mefluleucine has undergone several clinical trials to assess its potential as a treatment for depression, with a particular focus on treatment-resistant depression (TRD). The clinical development program for mefluleucine began with a Phase 1 trial initiated by Navitor Pharmaceuticals in 2018. This initial study was designed to evaluate the safety, tolerability, and pharmacokinetics of the compound in both healthy volunteers and patients diagnosed with TRD.

Following the Phase 1 trial, larger Phase 2 studies were launched to further investigate the efficacy and safety of mefluleucine as an adjunctive treatment for adults with TRD. These more extensive trials involved a larger number of participants and was structured to provide more comprehensive data on the compound's potential therapeutic benefits.

== See also ==
- List of investigational antidepressants
