= SESN2 =

Protein-coding gene in humans

Identifiers
- Aliases: SESN2, HI95, SES2, SEST2, sestrin 2
- External IDs: OMIM: 607767; MGI: 2651874; GeneCards: SESN2
Available structures
PDB	Ortholog search: PDBe RCSB
PDB	List of PDB id codes 5DJ4, 5CUF

Gene location (Human)
Chr.	Chromosome 1 (human)
Band	1p35.3	Start	28,259,518 bp
Band	1p35.3	End	28,282,491 bp

Gene location (Mouse)
Chr.	Chromosome 4 (mouse)
Band	4|4 D2.3	Start	132,219,343 bp
Band	4|4 D2.3	End	132,237,812 bp
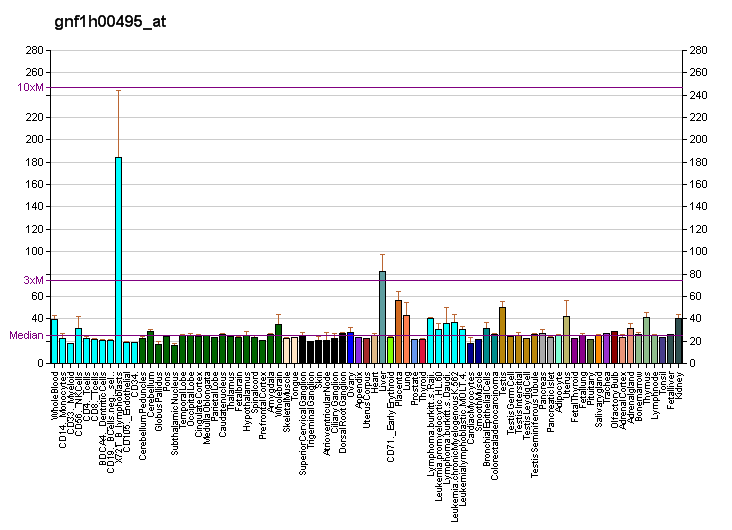
RNA expression pattern
Bgee	Human / Mouse (ortholog); Top expressed in: right ovary; gonad; left ovary; stromal cell of endometrium; mucosa of transverse colon; right lobe of liver; duodenum; blood; islet of Langerhans; human kidney / Top expressed in: granulocyte; right kidney; calvaria; proximal tubule; stroma of bone marrow; yolk sac; Rostral migratory stream; spermatocyte; lip; internal carotid artery; More reference expression data
BioGPS	More reference expression data
Gene ontology
Molecular function	protein binding; oxidoreductase activity, acting on peroxide as acceptor; leucine binding; sulfiredoxin activity; oxidoreductase activity; GDP-dissociation inhibitor activity
Cellular component	nucleus; mitochondrion; cytosol; cytoplasm; GATOR2 complex; nucleotide-activated protein kinase complex; Atg1/ULK1 kinase complex; TORC2 complex
Biological process	mitochondrial DNA metabolic process; mitochondrion organization; protein kinase B signaling; regulation of cAMP-dependent protein kinase activity; response to insulin; response to glucose; glucose homeostasis; glucose import; regulation of response to reactive oxygen species; triglyceride homeostasis; fatty acid beta-oxidation; negative regulation of TORC1 signaling; positive regulation of transcription from RNA polymerase II promoter in response to oxidative stress; reactive oxygen species metabolic process; positive regulation of macroautophagy; cellular response to amino acid stimulus; regulation of protein phosphorylation; DNA damage response, signal transduction by p53 class mediator; cellular response to leucine; positive regulation of protein localization to nucleus; cellular oxidant detoxification; negative regulation of cell growth; cellular response to oxidative stress; negative regulation of translation in response to endoplasmic reticulum stress; positive regulation of lipophagy; cellular response to amino acid starvation; cellular response to glucose starvation; cellular response to leucine starvation; regulation of gluconeogenesis
Sources:Amigo / QuickGO
Orthologs
Databases	NCBI: entry; OMA: entry
Species	Human	Mouse
Entrez	83667	230784
Ensembl	ENSG00000130766; ENSG00000285069	ENSMUSG00000028893
UniProt	P58004	P58043
RefSeq (mRNA)	NM_031459	NM_144907
RefSeq (protein)	NP_113647	NP_659156
Location (UCSC)	Chr 1: 28.26 – 28.28 Mb	Chr 4: 132.22 – 132.24 Mb
PubMed search
- Wikidata
View/Edit Human	View/Edit Mouse

Sestrin-2 also known as Hi95 is a protein that in humans is encoded by the SESN2 gene.

== Function ==
This gene encodes a member of the sestrin family of PA26-related proteins. The encoded protein may function in the regulation of cell growth and survival. This protein may be involved in cellular response to different stress conditions. The Sestrins constitute a family of evolutionarily-conserved stress-inducible proteins that suppress oxidative stress and regulate adenosine monophosphate-dependent protein kinase (AMPK)-mammalian target of rapamycin (mTOR) signaling. By virtue of these activities, the Sestrins serve as important regulators of metabolic homeostasis. Accordingly, inactivation of Sestrin genes in invertebrates resulted in diverse metabolic pathologies, including oxidative damage, fat accumulation, mitochondrial dysfunction and muscle degeneration that resemble accelerated tissue aging.

== Ligands ==
The NMDA receptor antagonist ketamine has been found to activate the mammalian target of rapamycin complex 1 (mTORC1) pathway in the medial prefrontal cortex (mPFC) of the brain as an essential downstream mechanism in the mediation of its rapid-acting antidepressant effects. NV-5138 is a ligand and modulator of sestrin2, a leucine amino acid sensor and upstream regulatory pathway of mTORC1, and is under development for the treatment of depression. The drug has been found to directly and selectively activate the mTORC1 pathway, including in the mPFC, and to produce rapid-acting antidepressant effects similar to those of ketamine.

== See also ==
- SESN1
