= XL-388 =

Chemical compound

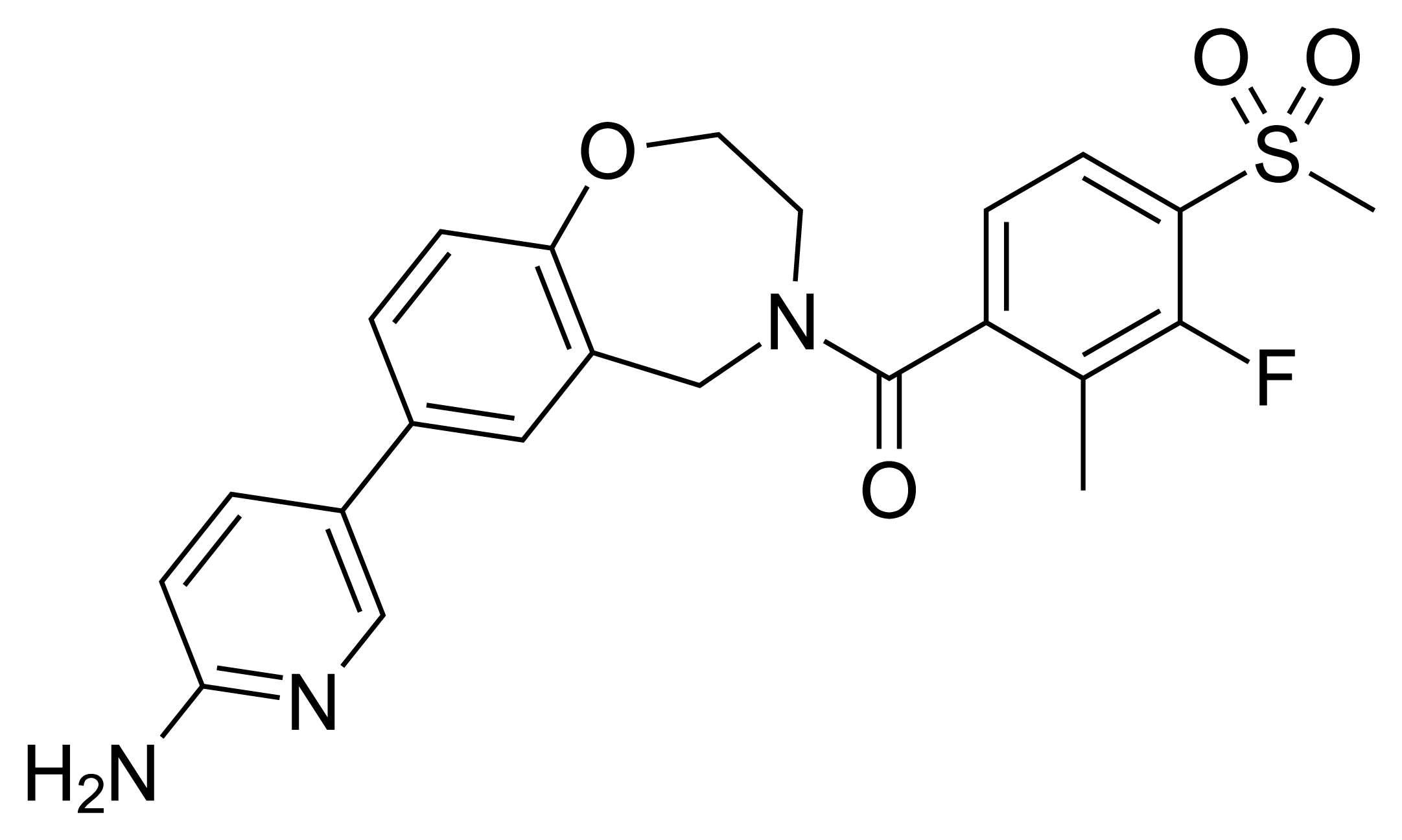

Identifiers
- IUPAC name: [7-(6-aminopyridin-3-yl)-3,5-dihydro-2H-1,4-benzoxazepin-4-yl]-(3-fluoro-2-methyl-4-methylsulfonylphenyl)methanone
- CAS Number: 1251156-08-7
- PubChem CID: 59604787
- ChemSpider: 28824127
- UNII: B7I5G3Z7XR
- ChEMBL: ChEMBL2333365
- CompTox Dashboard (EPA): DTXSID901336669

Chemical and physical data
- Formula: C_{23}H_{22}FN_{3}O_{4}S
- Molar mass: 455.50 g·mol^{−1}
- 3D model (JSmol): Interactive image
- SMILES: CC1=C(C=CC(=C1F)S(=O)(=O)C)C(=O)N2CCOC3=C(C2)C=C(C=C3)C4=CN=C(C=C4)N
- InChI: InChI=1S/C23H22FN3O4S/c1-14-18(5-7-20(22(14)24)32(2,29)30)23(28)27-9-10-31-19-6-3-15(11-17(19)13-27)16-4-8-21(25)26-12-16/h3-8,11-12H,9-10,13H2,1-2H3,(H2,25,26); Key:LNFBAYSBVQBKFR-UHFFFAOYSA-N

XL-388 is a drug which acts as a potent and selective inhibitor of both subtypes of the mechanistic target of rapamycin (mTOR), mTORC1 and mTORC2. It is being researched for the treatment of various forms of cancer, and has also been used to demonstrate a potential application for mTOR inhibitors in the treatment of neuropathic pain.
