= NPRL3 =

Protein-coding gene in humans

Identifiers
- Aliases: NPRL3, C16orf35, CGTHBA, HS-40, MARE, NPR3, RMD11, NPR3 like, GATOR1 complex subunit, FFEVF3
- External IDs: OMIM: 600928; MGI: 109258; HomoloGene: 8091; GeneCards: NPRL3; OMA:NPRL3 - orthologs

Gene location (Human)
Chr.	Chromosome 16 (human)
Band	16p13.3	Start	84,271 bp
Band	16p13.3	End	138,677 bp

Gene location (Mouse)
Chr.	Chromosome 11 (mouse)
Band	11 A4|11 18.83 cM	Start	32,175,628 bp
Band	11 A4|11 18.83 cM	End	32,217,707 bp
RNA expression pattern
Bgee	Human / Mouse (ortholog); Top expressed in: blood; muscle of thigh; right uterine tube; left ovary; right ovary; right hemisphere of cerebellum; apex of heart; right adrenal gland; right adrenal cortex; right frontal lobe / Top expressed in: muscle of thigh; neural layer of retina; lip; spermatocyte; dentate gyrus of hippocampal formation granule cell; superior frontal gyrus; right kidney; primary visual cortex; ventricular zone; interventricular septum; More reference expression data
BioGPS	n/a
Gene ontology
Molecular function	GTPase activator activity; protein binding
Cellular component	GATOR1 complex; lysosome; lysosomal membrane; membrane
Biological process	negative regulation of TOR signaling; cellular response to amino acid starvation; roof of mouth development; ventricular septum development; aorta morphogenesis; cardiac muscle tissue development; positive regulation of GTPase activity; TORC1 signaling; regulation of autophagosome assembly
Sources:Amigo / QuickGO
Orthologs
Species	Human	Mouse
Entrez	8131	17168
Ensembl	ENSG00000103148	ENSMUSG00000020289
UniProt	Q12980	Q8VIJ8
RefSeq (mRNA)	NM_001039476; NM_001077350; NM_001243247; NM_001243248; NM_001243249 NM_012075	NM_001284359; NM_001284360; NM_181569
RefSeq (protein)	NP_001034565; NP_001070818; NP_001230176; NP_001230177; NP_001230178	NP_001271288; NP_001271289; NP_853547
Location (UCSC)	Chr 16: 0.08 – 0.14 Mb	Chr 11: 32.18 – 32.22 Mb
PubMed search
- Wikidata
View/Edit Human	View/Edit Mouse

Nitrogen permease regulator-like 3 is a protein that in humans is encoded by the NPRL3 gene.

== Function ==
NPRL3 is a human protein of poorly understood function but has been associated with cancer.

The most prominent function ascribed to Nprl3 to date is as part of the GATOR1 complex (with NPRL2 and DEPDC5) that inhibits the mechanistic target of rapamycin (mTOR) kinase-complex-1 (mTORC1) on the surface of the lysosome (equivalent of degradative vacuole in yeast) via an effect on the Rag GTPase complex. Additionally, Nprl3 has been shown to adjust cell metabolism via the TOR pathway, and this is important for development of the cardiovascular system in mammals. Without this effect, spontaneous cell apoptosis would occur. A similar function for Nprl3 has been identified in the female reproductive system of Drosophila during times of protein scarcity.

== Gene ==
In Homo sapiens, the NPRL3 gene is located at C16orf35. The gene is composed of 14 exons at 53 kbp in length. This gene is highly conserved in vertebrates which is upstream from the alpha globin gene cluster. Within the fifth intron of the gene there is a regulatory section of DNA HS-40 which regulates the expression of the alpha globin. This means that the gene C16orf35 is expressed in early erythrocytes accompanying hemoglobin production.

== Structure ==
The human nitrogen permease regulator-like 3 protein has 569 amino acids.

=== Domains ===
There is a predicted N-terminal longin domain within the Nprl3 protein (amino acids 4–168). At the C terminus, there are three consecutive winged helix turn helix (HTH) domains. These regions are predicted bind to another macromolecule, which could be DNA, RNA or protein.
