= WYE-687 =

Chemical compound

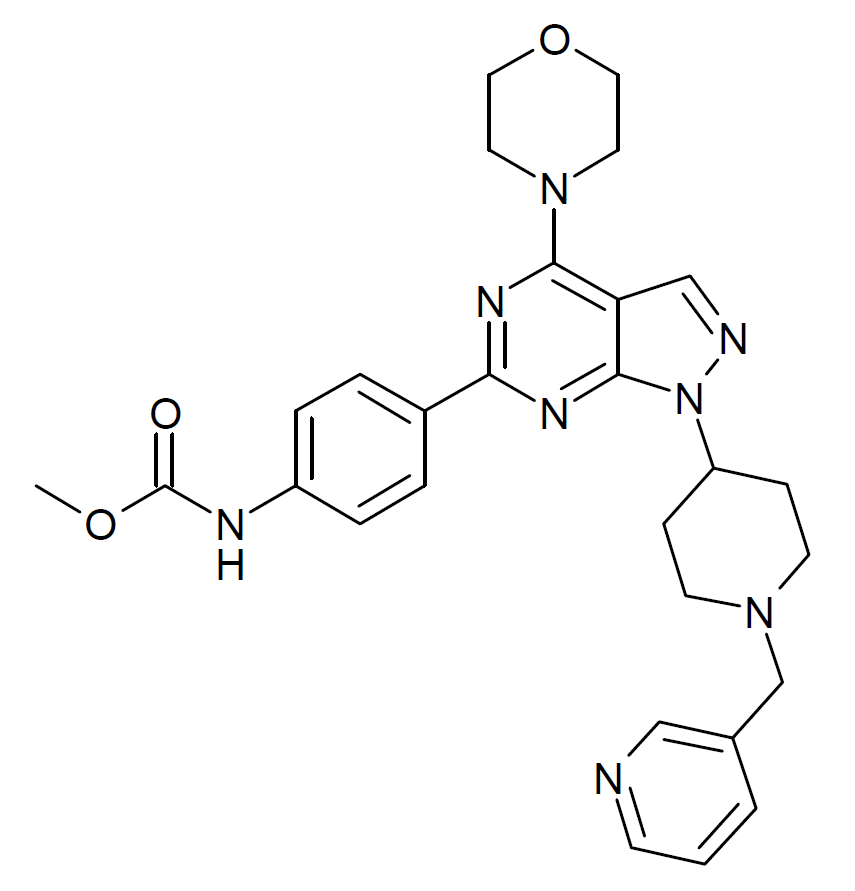

Identifiers
- IUPAC name: methyl N-[4-[4-morpholin-4-yl-1-[1-(pyridin-3-ylmethyl)piperidin-4-yl]pyrazolo[3,4-d]pyrimidin-6-yl]phenyl]carbamate
- CAS Number: 1062161-90-3
- PubChem CID: 25229450
- ChemSpider: 24626255
- ChEMBL: ChEMBL561103
- CompTox Dashboard (EPA): DTXSID40649396

Chemical and physical data
- Formula: C_{28}H_{32}N_{8}O_{3}
- Molar mass: 528.617 g·mol^{−1}
- 3D model (JSmol): Interactive image
- SMILES: COC(=O)NC1=CC=C(C=C1)C2=NC3=C(C=NN3C4CCN(CC4)CC5=CN=CC=C5)C(=N2)N6CCOCC6
- InChI: InChI=1S/C28H32N8O3/c1-38-28(37)31-22-6-4-21(5-7-22)25-32-26(35-13-15-39-16-14-35)24-18-30-36(27(24)33-25)23-8-11-34(12-9-23)19-20-3-2-10-29-17-20/h2-7,10,17-18,23H,8-9,11-16,19H2,1H3,(H,31,37); Key:VDOCQQKGPJENHJ-UHFFFAOYSA-N

WYE-687 is a drug which acts as an inhibitor of both subtypes of the mechanistic target of rapamycin (mTOR), mTORC1 and mTORC2. It is being researched for potential applications in the treatment of various forms of cancer.
