= SESN1 =

Protein-coding gene in the species Homo sapiens

Identifiers
- Aliases: SESN1, PA26, SEST1, sestrin 1
- External IDs: OMIM: 606103; MGI: 2155278; GeneCards: SESN1

Gene location (Human)
Chr.	Chromosome 6 (human)
Band	6q21	Start	108,984,309 bp
Band	6q21	End	109,094,846 bp

Gene location (Mouse)
Chr.	Chromosome 10 (mouse)
Band	10 B2|10 22.77 cM	Start	41,685,931 bp
Band	10 B2|10 22.77 cM	End	41,784,420 bp
RNA expression pattern
Bgee	Human / Mouse (ortholog); Top expressed in: Skeletal muscle tissue of rectus abdominis; muscle of thigh; thoracic diaphragm; glutes; gastrocnemius muscle; muscle of arm; biceps brachii; Skeletal muscle tissue of biceps brachii; triceps brachii muscle; right ovary / Top expressed in: myocardium of ventricle; intercostal muscle; conjunctival fornix; ciliary body; cerebellar vermis; interventricular septum; iris; lobe of cerebellum; retinal pigment epithelium; vestibular membrane of cochlear duct; More reference expression data
BioGPS	n/a
Gene ontology
Molecular function	oxidoreductase activity; peroxiredoxin activity; protein binding; leucine binding; oxidoreductase activity, acting on peroxide as acceptor
Cellular component	cytosol; cytoplasm; GATOR2 complex; nucleus; fibrillar center; TORC2 complex
Biological process	regulation of response to reactive oxygen species; reactive oxygen species metabolic process; cellular oxidant detoxification; negative regulation of TORC1 signaling; cellular response to amino acid starvation; cellular response to glucose starvation; positive regulation of macroautophagy; cellular response to amino acid stimulus; cellular response to leucine; cellular response to leucine starvation
Sources:Amigo / QuickGO
Orthologs
Databases	NCBI: entry; OMA: entry
Species	Human	Mouse
Entrez	27244	140742
Ensembl	ENSG00000080546	ENSMUSG00000038332
UniProt	Q9Y6P5	P58006
RefSeq (mRNA)	NM_014454; NM_001199933; NM_001199934	NM_001013370; NM_001162908
RefSeq (protein)	NP_001186862; NP_001186863; NP_055269	NP_001013388; NP_001156380
Location (UCSC)	Chr 6: 108.98 – 109.09 Mb	Chr 10: 41.69 – 41.78 Mb
PubMed search
- Wikidata
View/Edit Human	View/Edit Mouse

Sestrin 1, also known as p53-regulated protein PA26, is a protein that in humans is encoded by the SESN1 gene. This gene encodes a member of the sestrin family. Sestrins are induced by the p53 tumor suppressor protein and play a role in the cellular response to DNA damage and oxidative stress. The encoded protein mediates p53 inhibition of cell growth by activating AMP-activated protein kinase, which results in the inhibition of the mammalian target of rapamycin protein. The encoded protein also plays a critical role in antioxidant defense by regenerating overoxidized peroxiredoxins, and the expression of this gene is a potential marker for exposure to radiation. Alternatively spliced transcript variants encoding multiple isoforms have been observed for this gene.

== See also ==
- SESN2
