= SZT2 =

Protein-coding gene in humans

Identifiers
- Aliases: SZT2, C1orf84, EIEE18, KIAA0467, SZT2A, SZT2B, seizure threshold 2 homolog (mouse), KICSTOR complex subunit, SZT2 subunit KICSTOR complex, SZT2 subunit of KICSTOR complex, DEE18, KICS1
- External IDs: OMIM: 615463; MGI: 3033336; GeneCards: SZT2

Gene location (Human)
Chr.	Chromosome 1 (human)
Band	1p34.2	Start	43,389,882 bp
Band	1p34.2	End	43,454,247 bp

Gene location (Mouse)
Chr.	Chromosome 4 (mouse)
Band	4|4 D2.1	Start	118,219,940 bp
Band	4|4 D2.1	End	118,266,470 bp
RNA expression pattern
Bgee	Human / Mouse (ortholog); Top expressed in: epithelium of colon; sural nerve; granulocyte; apex of heart; anterior pituitary; right lobe of thyroid gland; right testis; left lobe of thyroid gland; left testis; right hemisphere of cerebellum / Top expressed in: Rostral migratory stream; Paneth cell; fossa; internal carotid artery; hand; substantia nigra; condyle; external carotid artery; vas deferens; cervix; More reference expression data
BioGPS	n/a
Gene ontology
Molecular function	protein binding; molecular function
Cellular component	GATOR2 complex; KICSTOR complex; GATOR1 complex; peroxisome; lysosome; lysosomal membrane; membrane
Biological process	pigmentation; corpus callosum morphogenesis; central nervous system development; regulation of superoxide dismutase activity; post-embryonic development; cellular response to glucose starvation; protein localization to lysosome; negative regulation of TORC1 signaling; response to nutrient levels; cellular response to amino acid starvation
Sources:Amigo / QuickGO
Orthologs
Databases	NCBI: entry; OMA: entry
Species	Human	Mouse
Entrez	23334	230676
Ensembl	ENSG00000198198	ENSMUSG00000033253
UniProt	Q5T011	A2A9C3
RefSeq (mRNA)	NM_001012960; NM_001012961; NM_015284; NM_182518; NM_001365999	NM_198170
RefSeq (protein)	NP_056099; NP_001352928	NP_937813
Location (UCSC)	Chr 1: 43.39 – 43.45 Mb	Chr 4: 118.22 – 118.27 Mb
PubMed search
- Wikidata
View/Edit Human	View/Edit Mouse

Seizure threshold 2 homolog is a protein that in humans is encoded by the SZT2 gene.

== Function ==
The protein encoded by this gene is expressed in the brain, predominantly in the parietal and frontal cortex as well as in dorsal root ganglia. It is localized to the peroxisome, and is implicated in resistance to oxidative stress. It likely functions by increasing superoxide dismutase (SOD) activity, but itself has no direct SOD activity. Studies in mice show that this gene confers low seizure threshold, and may also enhance epileptogenesis.

== Clinical significance ==
Mutations in this gene have been shown to cause infantile encephalopathy with epilepsy and dysmorphic corpus callosum.
