= RHEB =

Protein-coding gene in the species Homo sapiens

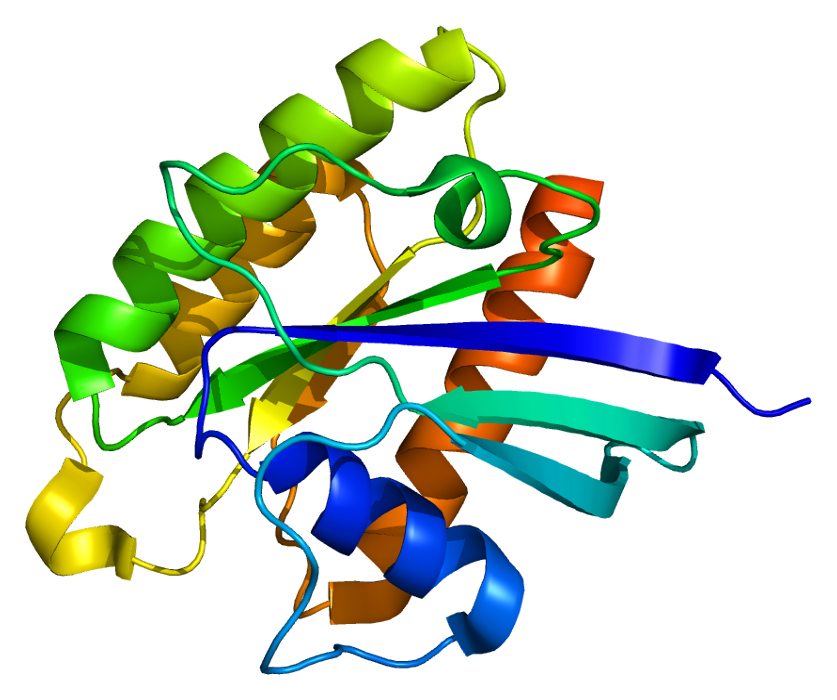

Identifiers
- Aliases: RHEB, RHEB2, Ras homolog enriched in brain, Ras homolog, mTORC1 binding
- External IDs: OMIM: 601293; MGI: 97912; GeneCards: RHEB
Available structures
PDB	Ortholog search: PDBe RCSB
PDB	List of PDB id codes 1XTQ, 1XTR, 1XTS, 3SEA, 3T5G

Gene location (Human)
Chr.	Chromosome 7 (human)
Band	7q36.1	Start	151,466,012 bp
Band	7q36.1	End	151,520,120 bp

Gene location (Mouse)
Chr.	Chromosome 5 (mouse)
Band	5|5 A3	Start	25,007,821 bp
Band	5|5 A3	End	25,047,622 bp
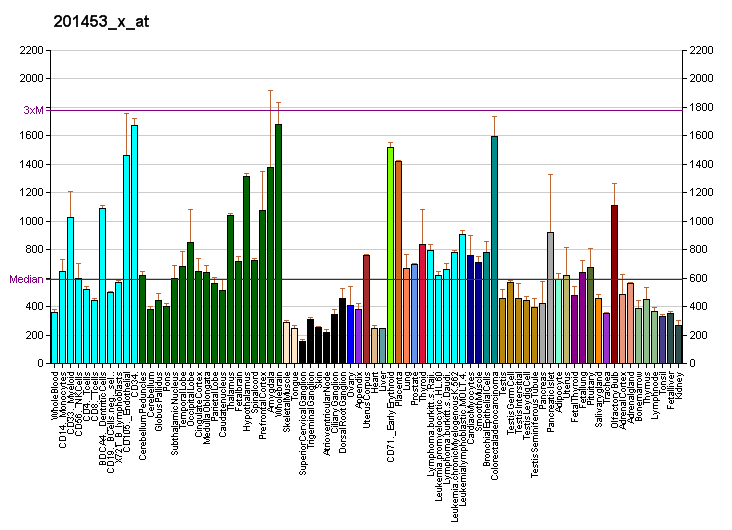

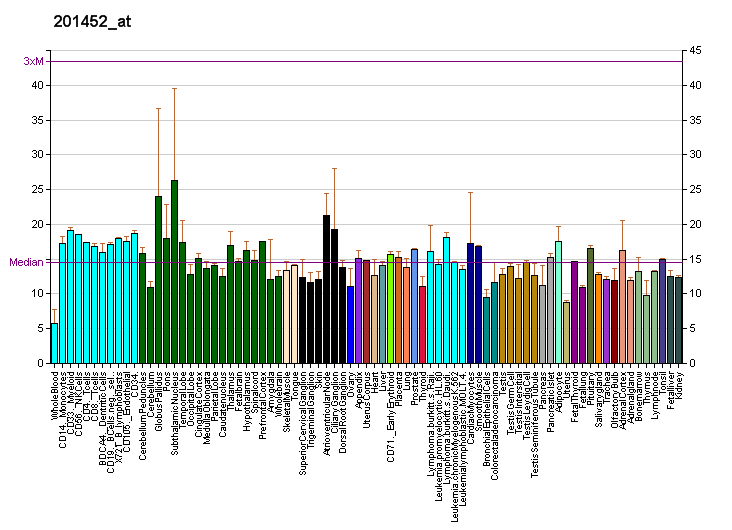

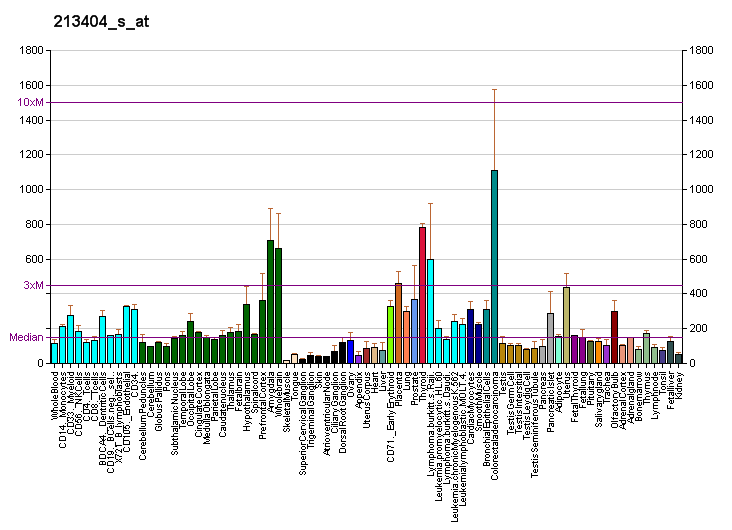
RNA expression pattern
Bgee	Human / Mouse (ortholog); Top expressed in: ventricular zone; ganglionic eminence; smooth muscle tissue; Brodmann area 9; gastric mucosa; cingulate gyrus; anterior cingulate cortex; muscle layer of sigmoid colon; left adrenal cortex; right frontal lobe / Top expressed in: otic vesicle; Epithelium of choroid plexus; saccule; Region I of hippocampus proper; otic placode; facial motor nucleus; condyle; vestibular sensory epithelium; nucleus of stria terminalis; medial ganglionic eminence; More reference expression data
BioGPS	More reference expression data
Gene ontology
Molecular function	nucleotide binding; metal ion binding; protein binding; protein kinase binding; magnesium ion binding; GTPase activity; GTP binding; GDP binding
Cellular component	cytoplasm; cytosol; Golgi apparatus; endoplasmic reticulum membrane; membrane; Golgi membrane; lysosomal membrane; endoplasmic reticulum; spliceosomal complex; extracellular exosome; endomembrane system; postsynaptic density; plasma membrane
Biological process	positive regulation of oligodendrocyte differentiation; regulation of TOR signaling; regulation of type B pancreatic cell development; positive regulation of TOR signaling; signal transduction; regulation of macroautophagy; negative regulation of cold-induced thermogenesis; small GTPase mediated signal transduction
Sources:Amigo / QuickGO
Orthologs
Databases	NCBI: entry; OMA: entry
Species	Human	Mouse
Entrez	6009	19744
Ensembl	ENSG00000106615	ENSMUSG00000028945
UniProt	Q15382	Q921J2
RefSeq (mRNA)	NM_005614	NM_053075
RefSeq (protein)	NP_005605	NP_444305
Location (UCSC)	Chr 7: 151.47 – 151.52 Mb	Chr 5: 25.01 – 25.05 Mb
PubMed search
- Wikidata
View/Edit Human	View/Edit Mouse

RHEB also known as Ras homolog enriched in brain (RHEB) is a GTP-binding protein that is ubiquitously expressed in humans and other mammals. The protein is largely involved in the mTOR pathway and the regulation of the cell cycle.

RHEB is a member of the Ras superfamily. Being a relative of Ras, the overexpression of RHEB can be seen in multiple human carcinomas. For this reason, ways to inhibit RHEB to control the mTOR pathway are studied as possible treatments for uncontrollable tumor cell growth in several diseases, especially in tuberous sclerosis.

== Structure ==
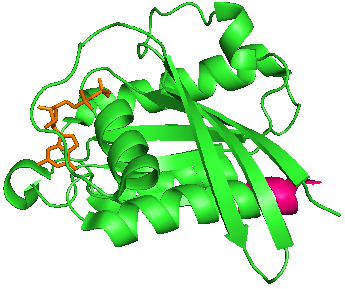
GDP bound to RHEB: GDP is in orange, GTPase region is in green, and hypervariable region in pink.

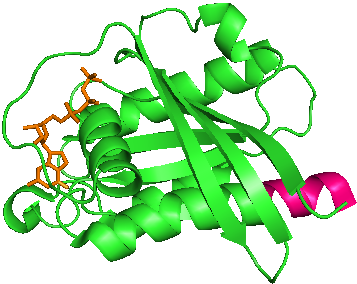
GTP bound to RHEB: GTP is in orange, GTPase region is in green, and hypervariable region in pink.

Rheb is a 21 kDa protein monomer composed of 184 amino acids. The first 169 amino acids by the N-terminus make up the GTPase domain, and the remaining amino acids are part of a hypervariable region ending at the C-terminus in a CAAX motif (C – cysteine, A – aliphatic amino acid, X – C-terminus amino acid).

The protein is a lipid-anchored, cell-membrane protein with five repeats of the RAS-related GTP-binding region. Also present are "switch" regions, I and II, which undergo conformational changes when shuttling between GTP-bound(activated) and GDP-bound(inactive) forms.

RHEB is expressed by the RHEB gene in humans. Three pseudogenes have been mapped, two on chromosome 10 and one on chromosome 22.

== Function ==
=== Activation of mTORC1 ===
RHEB is vital in regulation of growth and cell cycle progression due to its role in the insulin/TOR/S6K signaling pathway. Mechanistic Target of Rapamycin Complex 1 (mTORC1) is a serine/threonine kinase whose activation leads to phosphorylation cascades within the cell that lead to cell growth and proliferation. RHEB localizes at the lysosome to activate mTORC1 and Rag7 proteins localize mTORC1 to the lysosome and the Ragulator-Rag complex, allowing RHEB to activate the protein. RHEB acts as an activator for mTORC1 in its GTP-bound form, therefore GTP-bound RHEB activates cell growth and proliferation within the cell.

=== mTORC1 independent functions ===
RHEB can serve as a regulator, for other proteins independent from mTORC1. For example, RHEB is an activator for nucleotide synthesis by binding carbamoyl-phosphate synthetase 2, aspartate transcarbamylase, and dihydroorotase (CAD), an enzyme required for de novo pyrimidine nucleotide synthesis. An increased nucleotide pool within the cell can lead to increased cell proliferation. mTORC1 is also a regulator for CAD, so both RHEB and mTORC1 are involved with the control of nucleotide level within the cell. 5' adenosine-monophosphate-activated protein kinase (AMPK) has also been found to be an effector for RHEB. AMPK is a protein kinase that begins a phosphorylation cascade leading to autophagy. In rat studies, RHEB activates AMPK. RHEB has also been found to interact with effectors upstream in the mTOR pathway. Phospholipase D1 (PLD1) is upstream in the mTOR pathway and serves as a positive effector for mTORC1.

=== Other functions ===
RHEB may be involved in neural plasticity. This function is novel and not typically associated with the Ras proteins. Deficiency of RHEB in the forebrain of mice embryos is associated with decreased myelinization due to a decrease of mature oligodendrocytes.

In studies of RHEB knockout mice, it was shown through hematoxylin-eosin staining that heart development is highly impaired. The cardiac myocytes do not sufficiently grow in size, indicating that RHEB mTOR function is required. This suggested that RHEB and the activation of the mTOR pathway is a necessity for proper cardiac development in mice embryos.

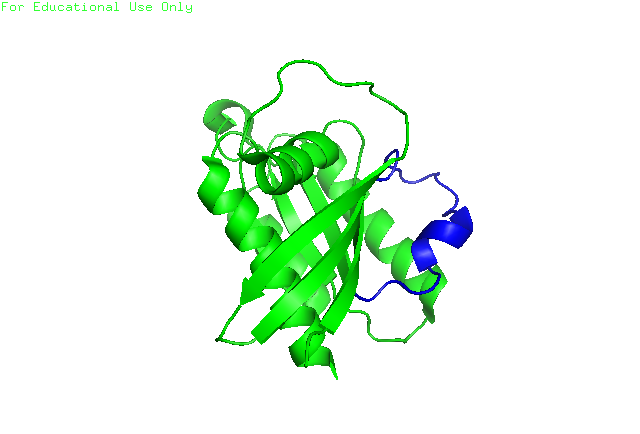
RHEB switch II (blue) has a less alpha-helical structure as compared to RAS switch II.

=== Differences from Ras superfamily ===
RHEB functions differently compared to other proteins in the Ras superfamily. Similar to those in the Ras superfamily, the protein has GTPase activity and shuttles between a GDP-bound form and a GTP-bound form, and farnesylation of the protein is required for this activity. However, unlike those in the Ras superfamily, conformational change when shuttling between forms only affects switch I, while switch II remains relatively stable, due to difference in secondary structure. Ras switch II forms a long α-helical structure between shuttling, while RHEB switch II adopts a more atypical conformation allowing for novel functions. Such a conformation causes a decreased intrinsic rate of GTP hydrolysis as compared to RAS due to the catalytic Asp65 in the switch II region of RHEB being blocked from the active site.

== Regulation ==
GTP hydrolysis activity of RHEB is intrinsically slow and the GTP-bound form is more common, thus RHEB is more likely active than not active within the cell. Its activity is strongly regulated within the cell by tumor-suppressant proteins that form the TSC complex. Specifically, the TSC2 subunit, tuberin of the complex interacts with and inhibits RHEB to regulate the protein. Tuberin stimulates RHEB to hydrolyze GTP, thus inactivating it.

== Tuberous sclerosis ==
Tuberous sclerosis is an autosomal dominant disease in which the genes required to express the tumor-suppressant proteins that form the TSC complex is mutated or missing, so the TSC complex is unable to function properly. This could lead to the disregulation of many signalling proteins and effectors within the cell, including RHEB. Unregulated activity of RHEB can lead to uncontrollable cell growth and cell division which could ultimately lead to formation of tumors.

== Interactions ==
RHEB has been shown to interact with:

- Ataxia telangiectasia mutated (ATM)
- Ataxia telangiectasia and Rad3 related (ATR)
- 5' AMP-activated protein kinase (AMPK)
- RAF proto-oncogene serine/threonine-protein kinase (C-Raf)
- mammalian Target of Rapamycin Complex 1 (mTORC1),
- Phospholipase D1 (PLD1)
- Regulatory-associated protein of mTOR (RPTOR)
- Tuberous sclerosis complex (TSC) and
- Carbamoyl-phosphate synthetase 2, aspartate transcarbamoylase, dihydroorotase (CAD)
