= LAMTOR4 =

Protein-coding gene in the species Homo sapiens

Identifiers
- Aliases: LAMTOR4, C7orf59, late endosomal/lysosomal adaptor, MAPK and MTOR activator 4
- External IDs: MGI: 1913346; HomoloGene: 19241; GeneCards: LAMTOR4; OMA:LAMTOR4 - orthologs

Gene location (Human)
Chr.	Chromosome 7 (human)
Band	7q22.1	Start	100,148,912 bp
Band	7q22.1	End	100,155,944 bp

Gene location (Mouse)
Chr.	Chromosome 5 (mouse)
Band	5|5 G2	Start	138,253,744 bp
Band	5|5 G2	End	138,257,660 bp
RNA expression pattern
Bgee	Human / Mouse (ortholog); Top expressed in: skin of abdomen; mucosa of transverse colon; skin of limb; skin of leg; skin of arm; granulocyte; C1 segment; monocyte; spleen; anterior pituitary / Top expressed in: granulocyte; yolk sac; right kidney; left lobe of liver; lip; ankle joint; sternocleidomastoid muscle; adrenal gland; lactiferous gland; muscle of thigh; More reference expression data
BioGPS	n/a
Gene ontology
Molecular function	molecular adaptor activity; protein binding; guanyl-nucleotide exchange factor activity
Cellular component	lysosomal membrane; lysosome; intracellular membrane-bounded organelle; Ragulator complex
Biological process	regulation of cell size; protein localization to lysosome; positive regulation of TOR signaling; cellular response to amino acid stimulus; regulation of macroautophagy
Sources:Amigo / QuickGO
Orthologs
Species	Human	Mouse
Entrez	389541	66096
Ensembl	ENSG00000188186	ENSMUSG00000050552
UniProt	Q0VGL1	Q8CF66
RefSeq (mRNA)	NM_001008395; NM_001318236; NM_001318237; NM_001394587; NM_001394588 NM_001394589	NM_001081108
RefSeq (protein)	NP_001008396; NP_001305165; NP_001305166	NP_001074577
Location (UCSC)	Chr 7: 100.15 – 100.16 Mb	Chr 5: 138.25 – 138.26 Mb
PubMed search
- Wikidata
View/Edit Human	View/Edit Mouse

Late endosomal/lysosomal adaptor, MAPK and MTOR activator 4 is a protein that in humans is encoded by the LAMTOR4 gene.
