= MB-3 (drug) =

Chemical compound

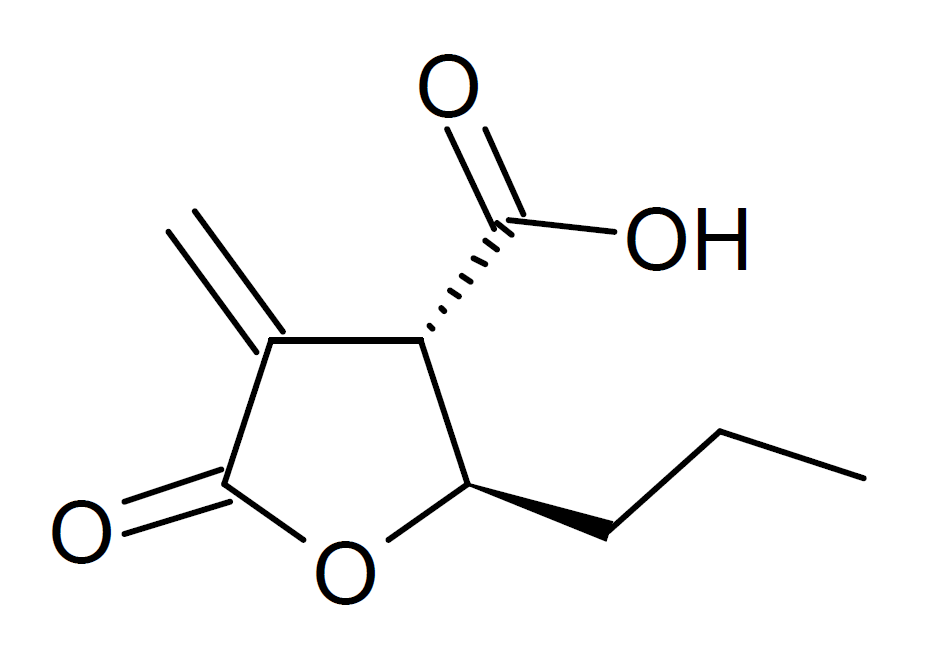

Identifiers
- IUPAC name: (2R,3S)-4-methylidene-5-oxo-2-propyloxolane-3-carboxylic acid
- CAS Number: 778649-18-6
- PubChem CID: 21579153
- ChemSpider: 10190941
- ChEBI: CHEBI:190985
- ChEMBL: ChEMBL217676

Chemical and physical data
- Formula: C_{9}H_{12}O_{4}
- Molar mass: 184.191 g·mol^{−1}
- 3D model (JSmol): Interactive image
- SMILES: CCC[C@@H]1[C@H](C(=C)C(=O)O1)C(=O)O
- InChI: InChI=1S/C9H12O4/c1-3-4-6-7(8(10)11)5(2)9(12)13-6/h6-7H,2-4H2,1H3,(H,10,11)/t6-,7+/m1/s1; Key:SRQUTZJZABSZRQ-RQJHMYQMSA-N

MB-3 is a drug which acts as a potent and selective inhibitor of the histone acetyltransferase enzyme GCN5, which usually functions as a negative modulator of PGC-1α, and so MB-3 acts to indirectly activate PGC-1α. It is used in research into the role of the GCN5/PGC-1α pathway in the regulation of metabolism and cell differentiation.

== See also ==
- HY-124798
