= Late endosomal/lysosomal adaptor, mapk and mtor activator 1 =

Protein-coding gene in the species Homo sapiens

LAMTOR1

Identifiers
- Aliases: LAMTOR1, C11orf59, PDRO, Ragulator1, p18, p27RF-Rho, late endosomal/lysosomal adaptor, MAPK and MTOR activator 1
- External IDs: OMIM: 613510; MGI: 1913758; GeneCards: LAMTOR1

Gene location (Human)
Chr.	Chromosome 11 (human)
Band	11q13.4	Start	72,085,895 bp
Band	11q13.4	End	72,103,297 bp

Gene location (Mouse)
Chr.	Chromosome 7 (mouse)
Band	7|7 E2	Start	101,555,111 bp
Band	7|7 E2	End	101,575,882 bp
RNA expression pattern
Bgee	Human / Mouse (ortholog); Top expressed in: monocyte; mucosa of ileum; granulocyte; right adrenal cortex; left adrenal gland; left adrenal cortex; stromal cell of endometrium; right lobe of thyroid gland; C1 segment; left lobe of thyroid gland / Top expressed in: white adipose tissue; quadriceps femoris muscle; yolk sac; lip; granulocyte; skeletal muscle tissue; proximal tubule; right kidney; muscle of thigh; heart; More reference expression data
BioGPS	n/a
Gene ontology
Molecular function	guanyl-nucleotide exchange factor activity; protein binding; molecular adaptor activity; GTPase binding
Cellular component	endosome; late endosome membrane; membrane; Ragulator complex; lysosomal membrane; membrane raft; lysosome; extracellular exosome; plasma membrane; azurophil granule membrane; specific granule membrane; ficolin-1-rich granule membrane
Biological process	regulation of cholesterol import; regulation of cholesterol efflux; endosome organization; lysosome localization; cellular response to amino acid stimulus; cholesterol homeostasis; regulation of receptor recycling; lysosome organization; regulation of cholesterol esterification; positive regulation of TOR signaling; positive regulation of MAPK cascade; neutrophil degranulation; regulation of macroautophagy; regulation of cell growth; regulation of molecular function; endosomal transport
Sources:Amigo / QuickGO
Orthologs
Databases	NCBI: entry; OMA: entry
Species	Human	Mouse
Entrez	55004	66508
Ensembl	ENSG00000149357	ENSMUSG00000030842
UniProt	Q6IAA8	Q9CQ22
RefSeq (mRNA)	NM_017907	NM_025605
RefSeq (protein)	NP_060377	NP_079881
Location (UCSC)	Chr 11: 72.09 – 72.1 Mb	Chr 7: 101.56 – 101.58 Mb
PubMed search
- Wikidata
View/Edit Human	View/Edit Mouse

Late endosomal/lysosomal adaptor, MAPK and MTOR activator 1 is a protein that in humans is encoded by the LAMTOR1 gene.
