= DEPDC5 =

Protein-coding gene in the species Homo sapiens

Identifiers
- Aliases: DEPDC5, DEP.5, FFEVF, DEP domain containing 5, FFEVF1, DEP domain containing 5, GATOR1 subcomplex subunit
- External IDs: OMIM: 614191; MGI: 2141101; GeneCards: DEPDC5

Gene location (Human)
Chr.	Chromosome 22 (human)
Band	22q12.2-q12.3	Start	31,753,867 bp
Band	22q12.2-q12.3	End	31,908,033 bp

Gene location (Mouse)
Chr.	Chromosome 5 (mouse)
Band	5 B1|5 17.35 cM	Start	33,021,045 bp
Band	5 B1|5 17.35 cM	End	33,151,580 bp
RNA expression pattern
Bgee	Human / Mouse (ortholog); Top expressed in: paraflocculus of cerebellum; frontal pole; middle frontal gyrus; epithelium of colon; Brodmann area 10; ventricular zone; sural nerve; testicle; mucosa of transverse colon; Achilles tendon / Top expressed in: spermatocyte; lumbar subsegment of spinal cord; tail of embryo; spermatid; lumbar spinal ganglion; yolk sac; ventricular zone; dentate gyrus of hippocampal formation granule cell; neural layer of retina; genital tubercle; More reference expression data
BioGPS	n/a
Gene ontology
Molecular function	protein-containing complex binding; GTPase activator activity
Cellular component	cytoplasm; perinuclear region of cytoplasm; GATOR1 complex; cytosol; lysosome; lysosomal membrane; membrane; Cul3-RING ubiquitin ligase complex; intracellular anatomical structure
Biological process	negative regulation of TOR signaling; cellular response to amino acid starvation; intracellular signal transduction; positive regulation of GTPase activity; negative regulation of TORC1 signaling; regulation of autophagy
Sources:Amigo / QuickGO
Orthologs
Databases	NCBI: entry; OMA: entry
Species	Human	Mouse
Entrez	9681	277854
Ensembl	ENSG00000100150	ENSMUSG00000037426
UniProt	O75140	P61460
RefSeq (mRNA)	NM_001007188; NM_001136029; NM_001242896; NM_001242897; NM_014662 NM_001363852; NM_001363854; NM_001364318; NM_001364319; NM_001364320; NM_001369901; NM_001369902; NM_001369903	NM_001025426; NM_001170567; NM_177786; NM_001360014
RefSeq (protein)	NP_001007189; NP_001129501; NP_001229825; NP_001229826; NP_055477 NP_001350781; NP_001350783; NP_001351247; NP_001351248; NP_001351249; NP_001356830; NP_001356831; NP_001356832	NP_001020597; NP_001164038; NP_808454; NP_001346943; NP_001391242 NP_001391243; NP_001391244; NP_001391245; NP_001391246; NP_001391247; NP_001391248; NP_001391249; NP_001391261; NP_001391262; NP_001391263; NP_001391264; NP_001391265
Location (UCSC)	Chr 22: 31.75 – 31.91 Mb	Chr 5: 33.02 – 33.15 Mb
PubMed search
- Wikidata
View/Edit Human	View/Edit Mouse

DEPDC5 (or DEP domain-containing 5) is a human protein of poorly understood function but has been associated with cancer in several studies. It is encoded by a gene of the same name, located on chromosome 22.

== Function ==
The function of DEPDC5 is not yet known, but it has been implicated in intracellular signal transduction based on homology between the DEP domains of DEPDC5 and Dishevelled-1 (DVL1).

Mutations in this gene have been associated to cases of focal epilepsy (doi:10.1038/ng.2601).

== Gene ==
In Homo sapiens, the DEPDC5 gene has been localized to the long arm of chromosome 22, 22q12.2-q12.3, between the PRRL14 and YWHAH genes. The clinical relevance of this gene includes an intronic SNP (rs1012068) that has been associated with a 2-fold hepatocellular carcinoma-risk increase.

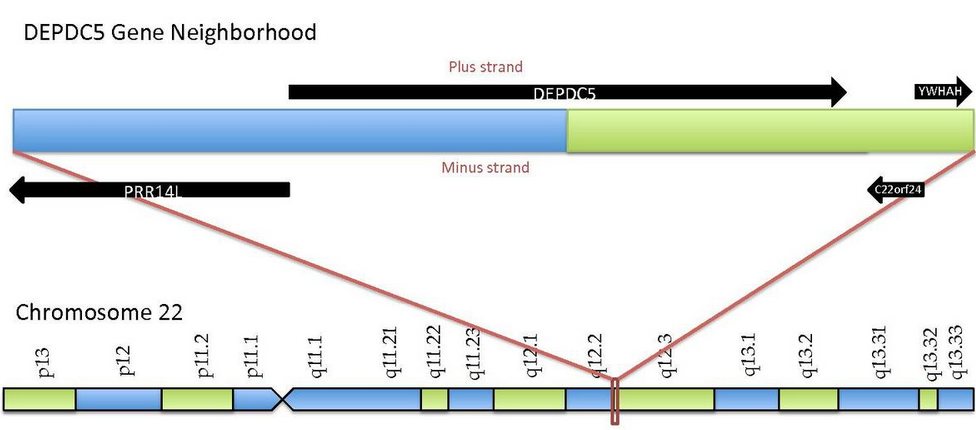

== Structure ==
=== Domains ===

==== DEP ====
The DEP domain derives its name from the proteins Dishevelled, Egl-10 and Pleckstrin, each of which contain a variant of this domain. It spans 82 residues and is 343 amino acids from the C-terminus. A SWISS-MODEL predicts two beta sheets and three alpha helices contained within the domain.

While its exact function is not known, the DEPDC5 DEP domain has the highest structural similarity to the DEP domain of DVL1 when performing a CBLAST at NCBI. The alignment scores an Evalue of 1.00e-08 and indicates 30% identity between the DEP domains of the two proteins. In DVL1, the DEP domain is involved in localization of the protein to the plasma membrane as part of the Wnt signaling pathway.

==== DUF 3608 ====
The DUF 3608 domain sits 99 amino acids from the N-terminus and itself spans 280 amino acids. PELE predicts at least one beta sheet and two alpha helices within this domain. It also contains 26 highly conserved residues and several post-translation modifications. Both occurrences are addressed later in this article.

Evidence for the function of DUF 3608 has been uncovered in the yeast homolog Iml1p. Imlp1's DUF 3608 is thought to aid in binding to two protein partners, Npr2 and Npr3. Together, these three proteins form the Iml1-Npr2-Npr3 complex and are involved in "non-nitrogen starvation" autophagy regulation. The researchers who uncovered this propose renaming DUF 3608 to RANS (Required for Autophagy induced under Non-nitrogen Starvation conditions).

=== Secondary structure ===
Based on unanimous consensus by the secondary structure prediction tool PELE, DEPDC5 contains at least ten alpha helices and nine beta sheets. The locations of these secondary structures are illustrated in the image below: red highlights are alpha helices and blue highlights are beta sheets.

== Homology ==
=== Orthologs ===
Fungi are the most distantly related organisms to contain a protein orthologous to human DEPDC5, including Saccharomyces cerevisiae and Albugo laibachii. In the fungi, the protein name is Iml1p, or vacuolar membrane-associated protein Iml1. Name deviations in other organisms include CG12090 (Drosophila) and AGAP007010 (mosquito). Conservation is high between humans and other vertebrate species, ranging from 74% identity in cichlids to 99% identity in chimpanzees.

The following table summarizes an analysis of 20 proteins orthologous to human DEPDC5.

Species	Common name	NCBI Accession #	NCBI Name	Length	Sequence identity	Sequence similarity	Years Since Divergence from Human (mya)
Pan troglodytes	Chimpanzee	XP_003317262	DEPDC5	1572 aa	99%	99%	6.4
Nomascus leucogenys	Gibbon	XP_003258163	DEPDC5	1602 aa	99%	99%	20.4
Mus musculus	Mouse	NP_001164038	DEPDC5	1591 aa	94%	96%	92.4
Bos Taurus	Cow	XP_002694678	DEPDC5	1593 aa	94%	96%	94.4
Sorex araneus	Shrew	ACE77702	DEPDC5	1570 aa	94%	96%	94.4
Monodelphis domestica	Possum	XP_001378772	DEPDC5	1522 aa	89%	93%	163.9
Gallus gallus	Chicken	XP_415249	DEPDC5	1592 aa	88%	93%	301.7
Meleagris gallopavo	Turkey	XP_003211073	DEPDC5	1592 aa	88%	93%	301.7
Taeniopygia guttata	Zebra finch	XP_002199825	DEPDC5	1572 aa	87%	92%	301.7
Xenopus tropicalis	Frog	XP_002931964	DEPDC5-like	1574 aa	79%	86%	371.2
Danio rerio	Zebra fish	XP_691450	DEPDC5-like	1590 aa	75%	84%	400.1
Oreochromis niloticus	Cichlid	XP_003459226	DEPDC5	1577 aa	74%	82%	400.1
Strongylocentrotus purpuratus	Sea urchin	XP_794020	similar to DEPDC5	1608 aa	43%	57%	742.9
Drosophila melanogaster	Drosophila	NP_647618	GC12090	1471 aa	41%	57%	782.7
Pediculus humanus corporis	Louse	XP_002429401	DEPDC, putative	1538 aa	38%	53%	782.7
Anopheles gambiae	Mosquito	XP_308760	AGAP007010-PA	1640 aa	36%	51%	782.7
Ascaris suum	Ascaris	ADY40551	DEPDCp5	1359 aa	31%	51%	937.5
Ustilago maydis	Corn smut	XP_757759	vacuolar-associated protein Iml1	1867 aa	23%	52%	1215.8
Saccharomyces cerevisiae	Yeast	NP_012672	Iml1p	1584 aa	20%	50%	1215.8
Albugo laibachii	White rust	CCA27519	vacuolar membrane-associated protein putative	1591 aa	20%	46%	1362

30 residues have been conserved since animals and fungi diverged, with 26 of these located in the DUF 3608 domain. The following multiple sequence alignment illustrates this conservation of the DUF domain; representatives from invertebrate and fungal clades are aligned to the human DUF 3608 with completely conserved residues colored green.

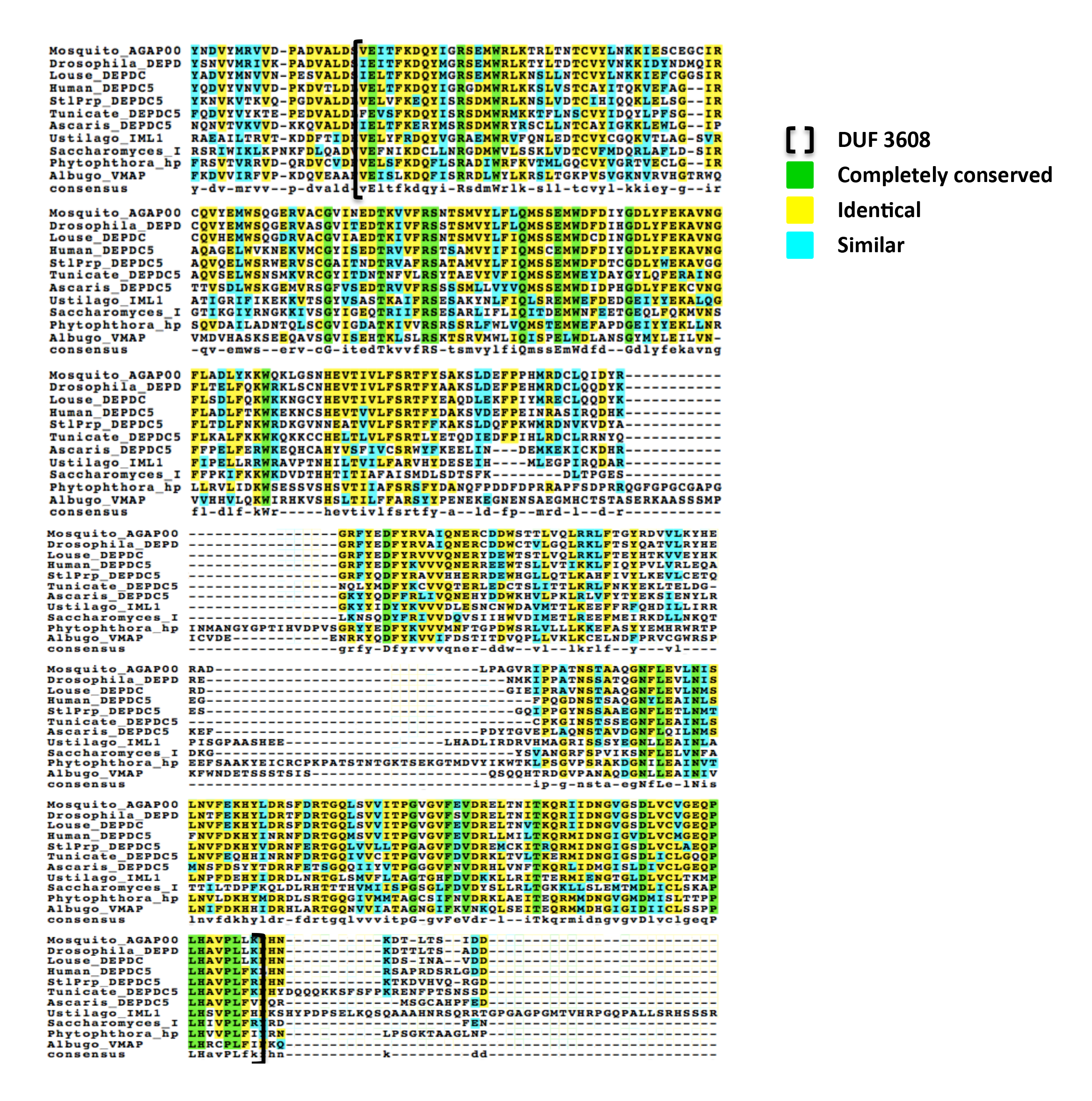

=== Paralogs ===
There are no known human DEPDC5 paralogs, but there are 64 human proteins containing a homologous DEP domain. There are also no identified paralogs for the yeast protein Iml1, the most distantly related ortholog of human DEPDC5.

== Expression ==
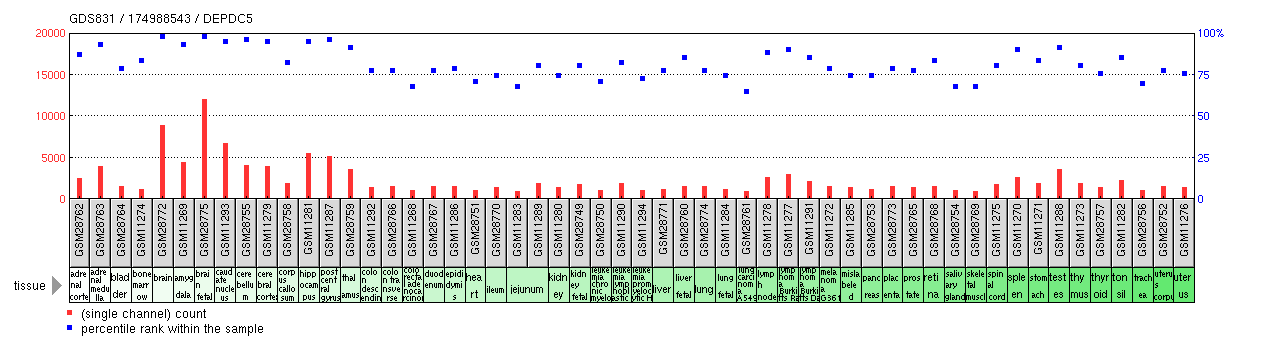
DEPDC5 expression has been characterized as ubiquitous in human tissue by RT-PCR analysis and in DNA microarray studies as displayed in the chart below.

One study on patients with hepatocellular carcinoma found higher DEPDC5 expression in tumor tissue than in non-tumor tissue. Conversely, a homozygous deletion of three genes, one being DEPDC5, was found in two glioblastoma cases. Other expression anomalies include zero expression in MDA-MB-231 breast cancer cell line and low expression in P116 (ZAP70 negative) cell line.

== Post-translational modifications ==
The following post-translational modifications were predicted with the proteomic tools compiled at ExPASy and PhosphoSite Plus for the human DEPDC5 protein.

Post-translational Modification	Number/Loci	Source
Phosphorylation	133/(Ser: 87 Thr: 23 Tyr: 23)	NetPhos
	6/S579, S582, S1499, Y1515, Y1519, Y1543	PhosphoSite Plus
Glycation	29/5, 8, 13, 14, 28, 34, 56, 59, 64, 93, 131, 147, 229, 247, 256, 319, 436, 528, 609, 710, 862, 878, 1008, 1185, 1233, 1387, 1408, 1499, 1567, 1597	NetGlycate
N-glycosylation site	9/N201, N298, N311, N384, N684, N1157, N1377, N1444, N1529	NetNGlyc
Sulfation	3/Y397, Y459, Y462	Sulfinator
Sumoylation	2/K59, K147	SUMOsp
Propeptide cleavage	2/R1004-M1005, R1528-N1529	ProP
O-glycosylation	0	NetOGlyc
C-mannosylation	0	NetCGlyc
Myristoylation	0	Myristoylation
Prenylation	0	PrePS
Acetylation	0	NetAcet

== Interaction ==
DEPDC5 may possibly interact with the proteasome subunit PSMA3 as evidenced by coimmunoprecipitation and the transcription factor MYC. DEPDC5 is in the "GATOR1" complex with NPRL2 and NPRL3.
