= NPRL2 =

Protein-coding gene in the species Homo sapiens

Identifiers
- Aliases: NPRL2, NPR2, NPR2L, TUSC4, NPR2-like, GATOR1 complex subunit, FFEVF2, NPR2 like, GATOR1 complex subunit
- External IDs: OMIM: 607072; MGI: 1914482; HomoloGene: 4771; GeneCards: NPRL2; OMA:NPRL2 - orthologs

Gene location (Human)
Chr.	Chromosome 3 (human)
Band	3p21.31	Start	50,347,330 bp
Band	3p21.31	End	50,350,826 bp

Gene location (Mouse)
Chr.	Chromosome 9 (mouse)
Band	9|9 F1	Start	107,419,425 bp
Band	9|9 F1	End	107,422,905 bp
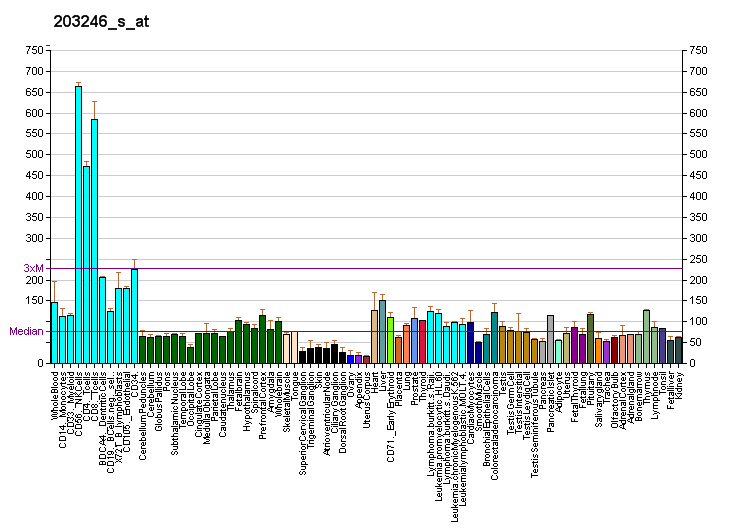
RNA expression pattern
Bgee	Human / Mouse (ortholog); Top expressed in: granulocyte; right hemisphere of cerebellum; body of pancreas; Skeletal muscle tissue of rectus abdominis; muscle of thigh; pituitary gland; anterior pituitary; prefrontal cortex; right frontal lobe; apex of heart / Top expressed in: interventricular septum; primary oocyte; right kidney; proximal tubule; spermatocyte; neural tube; superior frontal gyrus; dentate gyrus of hippocampal formation granule cell; secondary oocyte; nucleus of stria terminalis; More reference expression data
BioGPS	More reference expression data
Gene ontology
Molecular function	protein kinase activity; protein binding; GTPase activator activity
Cellular component	GATOR1 complex; lysosome; lysosomal membrane; membrane
Biological process	negative regulation of TOR signaling; cellular response to amino acid starvation; negative regulation of kinase activity; positive regulation of GTPase activity; protein phosphorylation; cellular response to nitrogen starvation; positive regulation of autophagy; regulation of autophagosome assembly
Sources:Amigo / QuickGO
Orthologs
Species	Human	Mouse
Entrez	10641	56032
Ensembl	ENSG00000114388	ENSMUSG00000010057
UniProt	Q8WTW4	Q9WUE4
RefSeq (mRNA)	NM_006545	NM_018879
RefSeq (protein)	NP_006536	NP_061367
Location (UCSC)	Chr 3: 50.35 – 50.35 Mb	Chr 9: 107.42 – 107.42 Mb
PubMed search
- Wikidata
View/Edit Human	View/Edit Mouse

Nitrogen permease regulator 2-like protein (NPRL2) also known as tumor suppressor candidate 4 (TUSC4) is a protein that in humans is encoded by the NPRL2 gene.
