= PRKAG2 =

Protein-coding gene in the species Homo sapiens

Identifiers
- Aliases: PRKAG2, AAKG, AAKG2, CMH6, H91620p, WPWS, protein kinase AMP-activated non-catalytic subunit gamma 2
- External IDs: OMIM: 602743; MGI: 1336153; HomoloGene: 136125; GeneCards: PRKAG2; OMA:PRKAG2 - orthologs

Gene location (Human)
Chr.	Chromosome 7 (human)
Band	7q36.1	Start	151,556,124 bp
Band	7q36.1	End	151,877,125 bp

Gene location (Mouse)
Chr.	Chromosome 5 (mouse)
Band	5|5 A3	Start	25,067,742 bp
Band	5|5 A3	End	25,305,640 bp
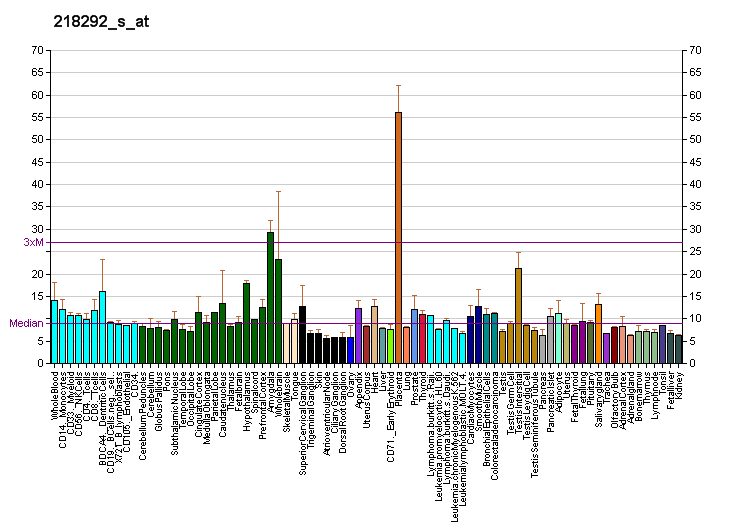
RNA expression pattern
Bgee	Human / Mouse (ortholog); Top expressed in: right auricle of heart; cardiac muscle tissue of right atrium; right coronary artery; left ventricle; left coronary artery; popliteal artery; tibial arteries; gastric mucosa; nucleus accumbens; apex of heart / Top expressed in: seminiferous tubule; atrium; spermatid; dentate gyrus of hippocampal formation granule cell; tail of embryo; superior frontal gyrus; primary visual cortex; atrioventricular valve; spermatocyte; subiculum; More reference expression data
BioGPS	More reference expression data
Gene ontology
Molecular function	nucleotide binding; ADP binding; AMP-activated protein kinase activity; protein kinase activator activity; phosphorylase kinase regulator activity; AMP binding; cAMP-dependent protein kinase regulator activity; cAMP-dependent protein kinase inhibitor activity; ATP binding; protein kinase binding; adenyl ribonucleotide binding
Cellular component	cytosol; nucleoplasm; nucleotide-activated protein kinase complex; extracellular space
Biological process	carnitine shuttle; intracellular signal transduction; sterol biosynthetic process; regulation of fatty acid oxidation; negative regulation of protein kinase activity; regulation of glucose import; lipid metabolism; regulation of fatty acid biosynthetic process; fatty acid metabolic process; regulation of glycolytic process; protein phosphorylation; fatty acid biosynthetic process; positive regulation of peptidyl-threonine phosphorylation; regulation of fatty acid metabolic process; ATP biosynthetic process; glycogen metabolic process; regulation of catalytic activity; macroautophagy; positive regulation of protein kinase activity; regulation of signal transduction by p53 class mediator; activation of protein kinase activity; negative regulation of protein serine/threonine kinase activity; regulation of macroautophagy; regulation of protein serine/threonine kinase activity
Sources:Amigo / QuickGO
Orthologs
Species	Human	Mouse
Entrez	51422	108099
Ensembl	ENSG00000106617	ENSMUSG00000028944
UniProt	Q9UGJ0	Q91WG5
RefSeq (mRNA)	NM_001040633; NM_001304527; NM_001304531; NM_016203; NM_024429 NM_001363698	NM_001170555; NM_001170556; NM_145401; NM_001310480
RefSeq (protein)	NP_001035723; NP_001291456; NP_001291460; NP_057287; NP_077747 NP_001350627	NP_001164026; NP_001164027; NP_001297409; NP_663376
Location (UCSC)	Chr 7: 151.56 – 151.88 Mb	Chr 5: 25.07 – 25.31 Mb
PubMed search
- Wikidata
View/Edit Human	View/Edit Mouse

5'-AMP-activated protein kinase subunit gamma-2 is an enzyme that in humans is encoded by the PRKAG2 gene.

== Function ==
AMP-activated protein kinase (AMPK) is a heterotrimeric protein composed of a catalytic alpha subunit, a noncatalytic beta subunit, and a noncatalytic regulatory gamma subunit. Various forms of each of these subunits exist, encoded by different genes. AMPK is an important energy-sensing enzyme that monitors cellular energy status and functions by inactivating key enzymes involved in regulating de novo biosynthesis of fatty acid and cholesterol. This gene is a member of the AMPK gamma subunit family and encodes a protein with four CBS domains. Mutations in this gene have been associated with ventricular pre-excitation (Wolff–Parkinson–White syndrome), progressive conduction system disease and cardiac hypertrophy. Alternate transcriptional splice variants, encoding different isoforms, have been characterized.

== Interactions ==
PRKAG2 has been shown to interact with PRKAB2 and PRKAB1.
