= CLCN2 =

Protein-coding gene in humans

Identifiers
- Aliases: CLCN2, CIC-2, CLC2, ECA2, ECA3, EGI11, EGI3, EGMA, EJM6, EJM8, LKPAT, clC-2, chloride voltage-gated channel 2, HALD2
- External IDs: OMIM: 600570; MGI: 105061; GeneCards: CLCN2

Gene location (Human)
Chr.	Chromosome 3 (human)
Band	3q27.1	Start	184,346,185 bp
Band	3q27.1	End	184,361,650 bp

Gene location (Mouse)
Chr.	Chromosome 16 (mouse)
Band	16 A3- B1|16 12.5 cM	Start	20,521,714 bp
Band	16 A3- B1|16 12.5 cM	End	20,536,496 bp
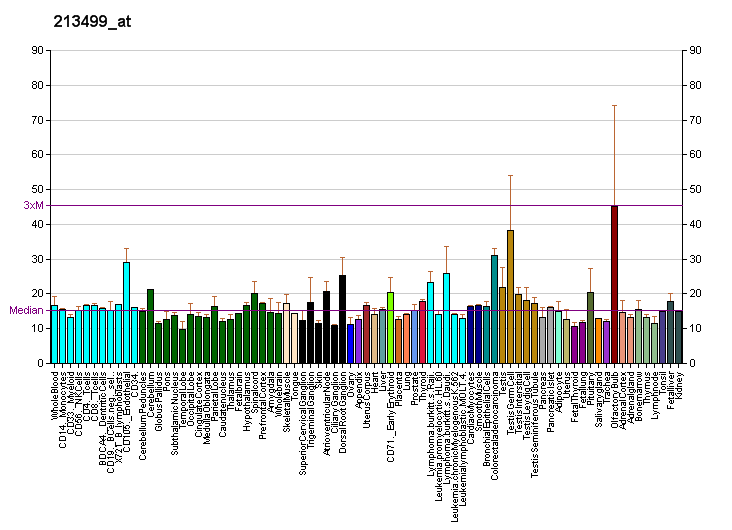
RNA expression pattern
Bgee	Human / Mouse (ortholog); Top expressed in: mucosa of transverse colon; tibial nerve; sural nerve; right testis; left testis; right hemisphere of cerebellum; C1 segment; rectum; gallbladder; right ovary / Top expressed in: intestinal villus; visual cortex; duodenum; primary visual cortex; superior frontal gyrus; jejunum; large intestine; colon; renal capsule; spermatocyte; More reference expression data
BioGPS	More reference expression data
Gene ontology
Molecular function	voltage-gated ion channel activity; chloride channel activity; voltage-gated chloride channel activity; protein binding
Cellular component	integral component of membrane; plasma membrane; membrane; chloride channel complex; integral component of plasma membrane
Biological process	cell differentiation involved in salivary gland development; ion transmembrane transport; chloride transport; regulation of ion transmembrane transport; ion transport; retina development in camera-type eye; transmembrane transport; chloride transmembrane transport; regulation of aldosterone biosynthetic process
Sources:Amigo / QuickGO
Orthologs
Databases	NCBI: entry; OMA: entry
Species	Human	Mouse
Entrez	1181	12724
Ensembl	ENSG00000114859	ENSMUSG00000022843
UniProt	P51788	Q9R0A1
RefSeq (mRNA)	NM_001171087; NM_001171088; NM_001171089; NM_004366	NM_009900
RefSeq (protein)	NP_001164558; NP_001164559; NP_001164560; NP_004357	NP_034030
Location (UCSC)	Chr 3: 184.35 – 184.36 Mb	Chr 16: 20.52 – 20.54 Mb
PubMed search
- Wikidata
View/Edit Human	View/Edit Mouse

Chloride channel protein 2 is a protein that in humans is encoded by the CLCN2 gene. Mutations of this gene have been found to cause leukoencephalopathy and Idiopathic generalised epilepsy (OMIM: 600699), although the latter claim has been disputed.

A gain of function mutation in the CLCN2 gene was found to cause primary aldosteronism, a form of arterial hypertension due to excessive production of aldosterone by the neuroendocrine cells of the zona glomerulosa of the adrenal gland. The mutation was found to cause a chloride leak in these cells and increased the expression of aldosterone synthase.

CLCN2 contains a transmembrane region that is involved in chloride ion transport as well two intracellular copies of the CBS domain.

== See also ==
- Chloride channel
