= PRKAG1 =

Protein-coding gene in the species Homo sapiens

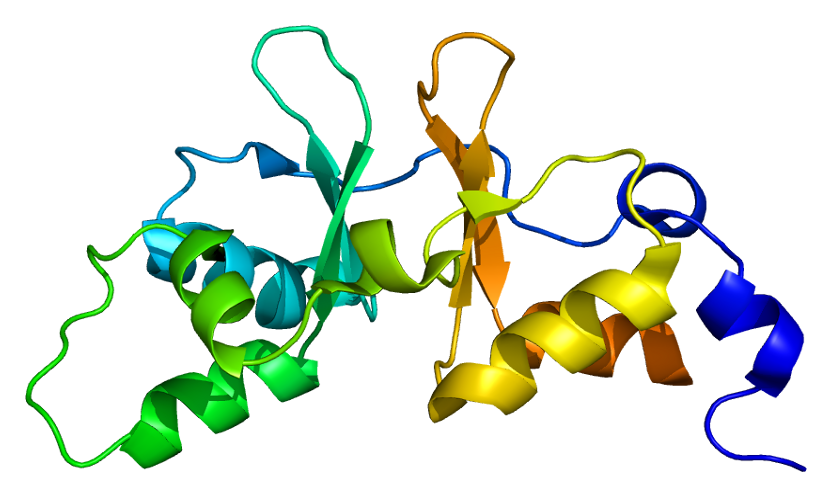
Available structures
PDB	Ortholog search: PDBe RCSB
PDB	List of PDB id codes 2UV4, 2UV5, 2UV6, 2UV7, 4CFE, 4CFF, 4RER, 4REW, 5EZV, 4ZHX

Identifiers
- Aliases: PRKAG1, AMPKG, protein kinase AMP-activated non-catalytic subunit gamma 1
- External IDs: OMIM: 602742; MGI: 108411; HomoloGene: 99712; GeneCards: PRKAG1; OMA:PRKAG1 - orthologs

Gene location (Human)
Chr.	Chromosome 12 (human)
Band	12q13.12	Start	49,002,274 bp
Band	12q13.12	End	49,018,807 bp

Gene location (Mouse)
Chr.	Chromosome 15 (mouse)
Band	15 F1|15 54.73 cM	Start	98,710,678 bp
Band	15 F1|15 54.73 cM	End	98,729,402 bp
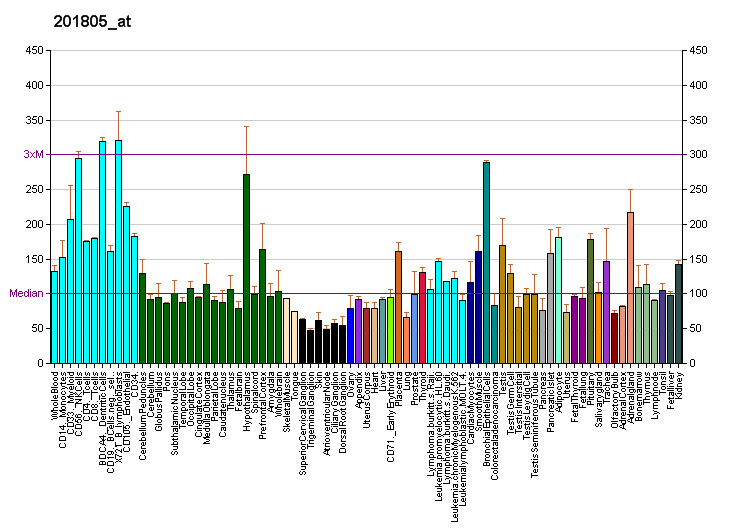
RNA expression pattern
Bgee	Human / Mouse (ortholog); Top expressed in: gastrocnemius muscle; islet of Langerhans; right adrenal cortex; left ventricle; left adrenal gland; triceps brachii muscle; left adrenal cortex; muscle of thigh; right auricle of heart; apex of heart / Top expressed in: saccule; granulocyte; otic placode; otic vesicle; right ventricle; fetal liver hematopoietic progenitor cell; molar; internal carotid artery; external carotid artery; gastrula; More reference expression data
BioGPS	More reference expression data
Gene ontology
Molecular function	nucleotide binding; protein kinase activity; cAMP-dependent protein kinase activity; ADP binding; AMP-activated protein kinase activity; AMP binding; protein binding; cAMP-dependent protein kinase regulator activity; protein kinase binding; ATP binding; adenyl ribonucleotide binding
Cellular component	cytosol; membrane; nucleotide-activated protein kinase complex; extracellular exosome; nucleus; nucleoplasm
Biological process	lipid metabolism; fatty acid metabolic process; regulation of glycolytic process; protein phosphorylation; positive regulation of gene expression; fatty acid biosynthetic process; spermatogenesis; macroautophagy; signal transduction; positive regulation of protein kinase activity; regulation of signal transduction by p53 class mediator; regulation of macroautophagy; import into nucleus; regulation of protein serine/threonine kinase activity
Sources:Amigo / QuickGO
Orthologs
Species	Human	Mouse
Entrez	5571	19082
Ensembl	ENSG00000181929	ENSMUSG00000067713
UniProt	P54619	O54950
RefSeq (mRNA)	NM_001206709; NM_001206710; NM_002733; NM_212461	NM_016781
RefSeq (protein)	NP_001193638; NP_001193639; NP_002724	NP_058061
Location (UCSC)	Chr 12: 49 – 49.02 Mb	Chr 15: 98.71 – 98.73 Mb
PubMed search
- Wikidata
View/Edit Human	View/Edit Mouse

5'-AMP-activated protein kinase subunit gamma-1 is an enzyme that in humans is encoded by the PRKAG1 gene.

== Function ==
The protein encoded by this gene is a regulatory subunit of the AMP-activated protein kinase (AMPK). AMPK is a heterotrimer consisting of an alpha catalytic subunit, and non-catalytic beta and gamma subunits. AMPK is an important energy-sensing enzyme that monitors cellular energy status. In response to cellular metabolic stresses, AMPK is activated, and thus phosphorylates and inactivates acetyl-CoA carboxylase (ACC) and beta-hydroxy beta-methylglutaryl-CoA reductase (HMGCR), key enzymes involved in regulating de novo biosynthesis of fatty acid and cholesterol. This subunit is one of the gamma regulatory subunits of AMPK. Alternatively spliced transcript variants encoding distinct isoforms have been observed.

== Interactions ==
PRKAG1 has been shown to interact with PRKAB2 and PRKAB1.
