= PRKAB1 =

Protein-coding gene in the species Homo sapiens

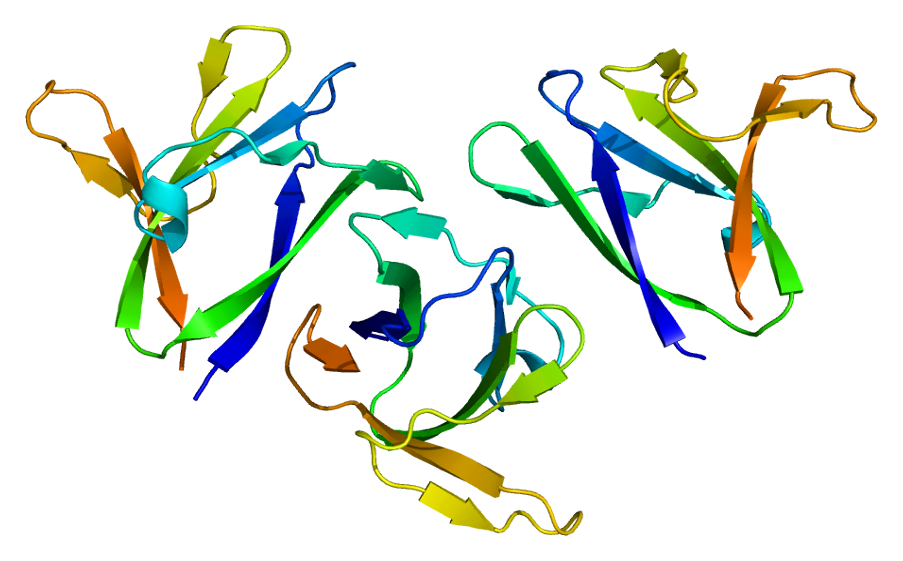
Available structures
PDB	Ortholog search: PDBe RCSB
PDB	List of PDB id codes 4CFE, 4CFF, 5EZV, 4ZHX,%%s4ZHX, 5EZV

Identifiers
- Aliases: PRKAB1, AMPK, HAMPKb, protein kinase AMP-activated non-catalytic subunit beta 1
- External IDs: OMIM: 602740; MGI: 1336167; HomoloGene: 38160; GeneCards: PRKAB1; OMA:PRKAB1 - orthologs

Gene location (Human)
Chr.	Chromosome 12 (human)
Band	12q24.23	Start	119,667,864 bp
Band	12q24.23	End	119,681,624 bp

Gene location (Mouse)
Chr.	Chromosome 5 (mouse)
Band	5|5 F	Start	116,151,645 bp
Band	5|5 F	End	116,162,567 bp
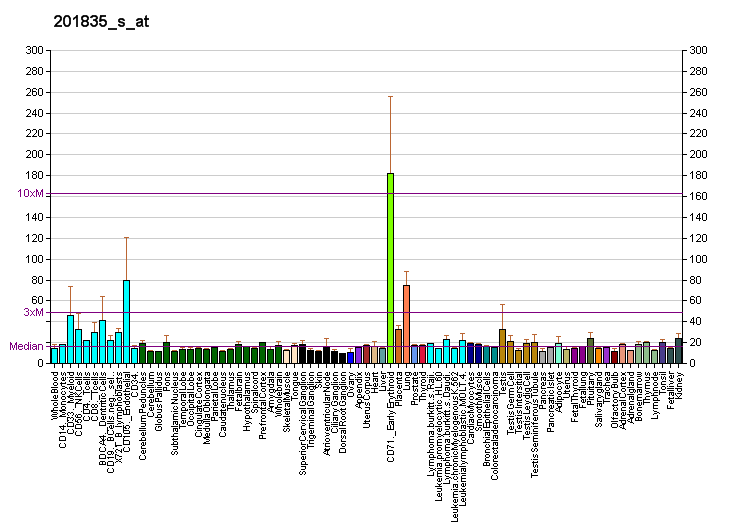

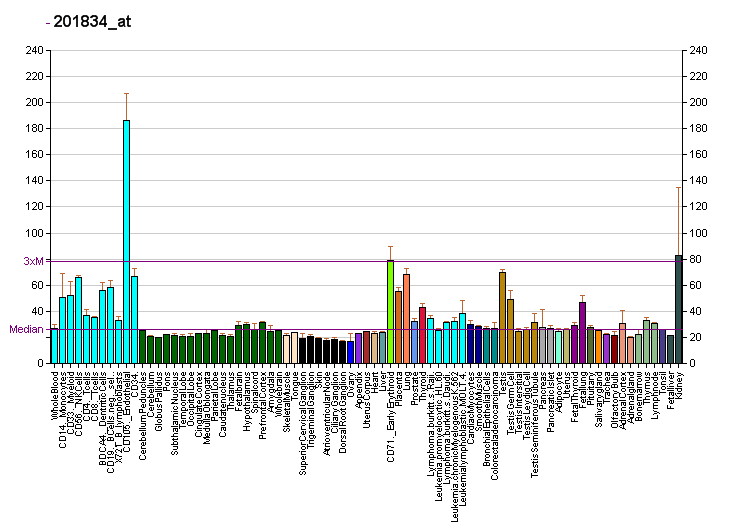
RNA expression pattern
Bgee	Human / Mouse (ortholog); Top expressed in: rectum; mucosa of transverse colon; olfactory zone of nasal mucosa; human kidney; body of stomach; spleen; renal medulla; upper lobe of left lung; body of pancreas; right lung / Top expressed in: granulocyte; neural layer of retina; yolk sac; secondary oocyte; medullary collecting duct; fetal liver hematopoietic progenitor cell; transitional epithelium of urinary bladder; zygote; primary oocyte; genital tubercle; More reference expression data
BioGPS	More reference expression data
Gene ontology
Molecular function	protein kinase activity; AMP-activated protein kinase activity; protein binding; protein kinase binding; kinase activity
Cellular component	cytosol; nucleotide-activated protein kinase complex; nucleus; nucleoplasm; protein-containing complex; cytoplasm
Biological process	protein heterooligomerization; lipid metabolism; fatty acid metabolic process; protein phosphorylation; positive regulation of gene expression; fatty acid biosynthetic process; regulation of catalytic activity; macroautophagy; nail development; signal transduction; positive regulation of cold-induced thermogenesis; regulation of macroautophagy; regulation of signal transduction by p53 class mediator; phosphorylation
Sources:Amigo / QuickGO
Orthologs
Species	Human	Mouse
Entrez	5564	19079
Ensembl	ENSG00000111725	ENSMUSG00000029513
UniProt	Q9Y478	Q9R078
RefSeq (mRNA)	NM_006253	NM_031869
RefSeq (protein)	NP_006244; NP_006244.2	NP_114075
Location (UCSC)	Chr 12: 119.67 – 119.68 Mb	Chr 5: 116.15 – 116.16 Mb
PubMed search
- Wikidata
View/Edit Human	View/Edit Mouse

5'-AMP-activated protein kinase subunit beta-1 is an enzyme that in humans is encoded by the PRKAB1 gene.

The protein encoded by this gene is a regulatory subunit of the AMP-activated protein kinase (AMPK). AMPK is a heterotrimer consisting of an alpha catalytic subunit, and non-catalytic beta and gamma subunits. AMPK is an important energy-sensing enzyme that monitors cellular energy status. In response to cellular metabolic stresses, AMPK is activated, and thus phosphorylates and inactivates acetyl-CoA carboxylase (ACC) and beta-hydroxy beta-methylglutaryl-CoA reductase (HMGCR), key enzymes involved in regulating de novo biosynthesis of fatty acid and cholesterol. This subunit may be a positive regulator of AMPK activity. The myristoylation and phosphorylation of this subunit have been shown to affect the enzyme activity and cellular localization of AMPK. This subunit may also serve as an adaptor molecule mediating the association of the AMPK complex.

== Interactions ==
PRKAB1 has been shown to interact with PRKAG2 and PRKAG1.

The 5'-AMP-activated protein kinase beta subunit interaction domain (AMPKBI) is a conserved domain found in the beta subunit of the 5-AMP-activated protein kinase complex, and its yeast homologues Sip1 (SNF1-interacting protein 1), Sip2 (SNF1-interacting protein 2) and Gal83 (galactose metabolism 83), which are found in the SNF1 (sucrose non-fermenting) kinase complex. This region is sufficient for interaction of this subunit with the kinase complex, but is not solely responsible for the interaction, and the interaction partner is not known.

AMPKBI

Identifiers
- Symbol: AMPKBI
- Pfam: PF04739
- InterPro: IPR006828
Available protein structures:
- Pfam: structures / ECOD
- PDB: RCSB PDB; PDBe; PDBj
- PDBsum: structure summary
