= Reductase kinase =

Reductase kinase may refer to:

- Dephospho-(reductase kinase) kinase, an enzyme
- AMP-activated protein kinase, an enzyme
