= Protein kinase, AMP-activated, alpha 1 =

Protein-coding gene in the species Homo sapiens

PRKAA1
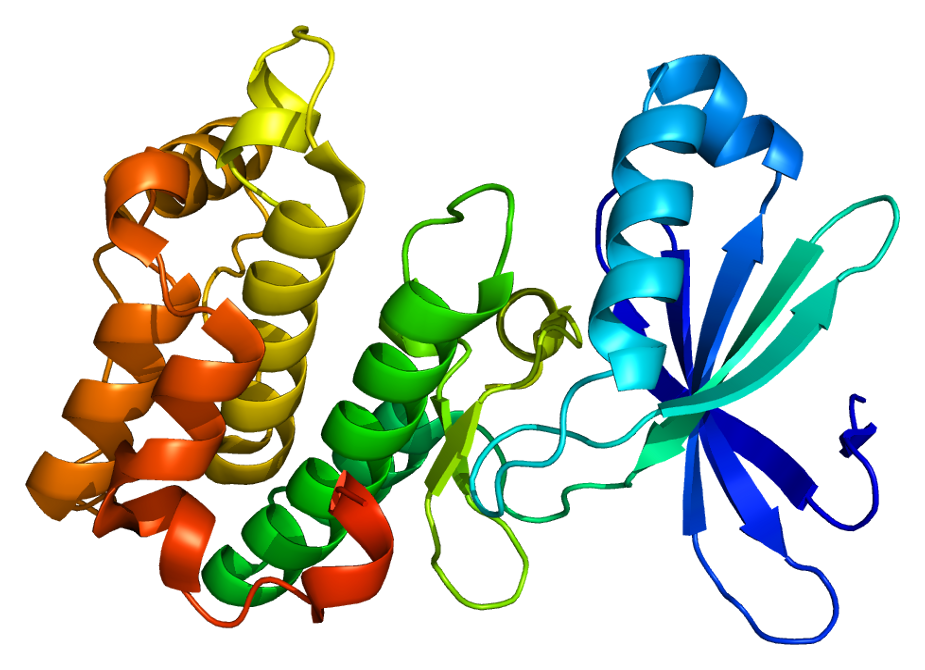
Available structures
PDB	Ortholog search: PDBe RCSB
PDB	List of PDB id codes 4RED, 4RER, 4REW, 5EZV

Identifiers
- Aliases: PRKAA1, AMPK, AMPKa1, Protein kinase, AMP-activated, alpha 1, protein kinase AMP-activated catalytic subunit alpha 1
- External IDs: OMIM: 602739; MGI: 2145955; HomoloGene: 49590; GeneCards: PRKAA1; OMA:PRKAA1 - orthologs
- EC number: 2.7.11.26

Gene location (Human)
Chr.	Chromosome 5 (human)
Band	n/a	Start	40,759,379 bp
Band	n/a	End	40,798,374 bp

Gene location (Mouse)
Chr.	Chromosome 15 (mouse)
Band	15|15 A1	Start	5,173,343 bp
Band	15|15 A1	End	5,211,380 bp
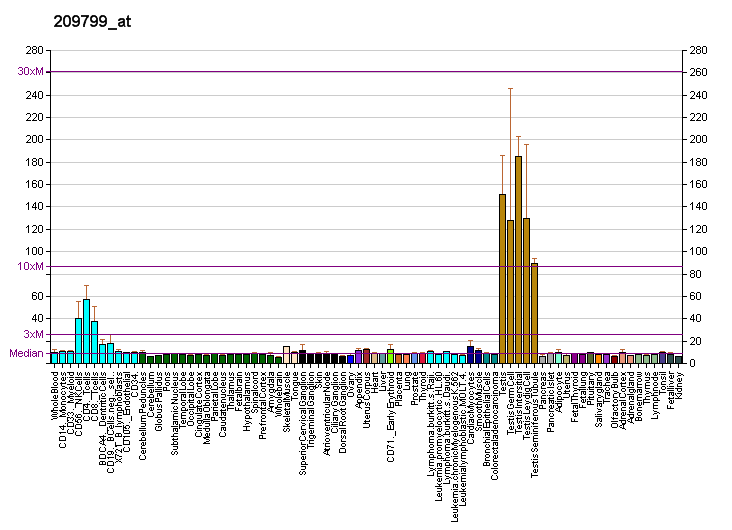
RNA expression pattern
Bgee	Human / Mouse (ortholog); Top expressed in: Achilles tendon; sperm; rectum; gallbladder; gastric mucosa; stromal cell of endometrium; epithelium of colon; tibial arteries; body of pancreas; Descending thoracic aorta / Top expressed in: granulocyte; islet of Langerhans; epithelium of small intestine; mammillary body; white adipose tissue; hand; ventromedial nucleus; medial vestibular nucleus; lateral hypothalamus; ventral tegmental area; More reference expression data
BioGPS	More reference expression data
Gene ontology
Molecular function	transferase activity; nucleotide binding; protein kinase activity; cAMP-dependent protein kinase activity; [acetyl-CoA carboxylase kinase activity]; AMP-activated protein kinase activity; histone serine kinase activity; chromatin binding; metal ion binding; kinase activity; protein serine/threonine kinase activity; tau-protein kinase activity; protein C-terminus binding; protein binding; [hydroxymethylglutaryl-CoA reductase (NADPH) kinase activity]; ATP binding; tau protein binding
Cellular component	nucleotide-activated protein kinase complex; apical plasma membrane; nucleoplasm; nucleus; cytoplasm; cytosol; nuclear speck; intracellular anatomical structure; axon; dendrite; protein-containing complex; soma
Biological process	cellular response to organonitrogen compound; steroid metabolic process; cellular response to glucose starvation; sterol biosynthetic process; lipid biosynthetic process; regulation of transcription, DNA-templated; response to hypoxia; cellular response to ethanol; glucose homeostasis; positive regulation of skeletal muscle tissue development; protein heterooligomerization; rhythmic process; phosphorylation; lipid metabolism; regulation of vesicle-mediated transport; negative regulation of apoptotic process; cholesterol metabolic process; Wnt signaling pathway; response to activity; fatty acid metabolic process; transcription, DNA-templated; cellular response to prostaglandin E stimulus; autophagy; protein phosphorylation; negative regulation of TOR signaling; cold acclimation; positive regulation of gene expression; response to camptothecin; fatty acid biosynthetic process; fatty acid homeostasis; regulation of circadian rhythm; fatty acid oxidation; regulation of peptidyl-serine phosphorylation; cellular response to nutrient levels; positive regulation of cell population proliferation; negative regulation of glucosylceramide biosynthetic process; glucose metabolic process; positive regulation of cholesterol biosynthetic process; response to caffeine; cholesterol biosynthetic process; negative regulation of lipid catabolic process; response to gamma radiation; macroautophagy; response to UV; positive regulation of glycolytic process; response to hydrogen peroxide; cellular response to hypoxia; signal transduction; cellular response to hydrogen peroxide; steroid biosynthetic process; regulation of signal transduction by p53 class mediator; positive regulation of autophagy; CAMKK-AMPK signaling cascade; regulation of macroautophagy; chromatin organization; positive regulation of mitochondrial transcription; positive regulation of protein targeting to mitochondrion; negative regulation of gene expression; cellular response to oxidative stress; intracellular signal transduction; negative regulation of insulin receptor signaling pathway; motor behavior; regulation of stress granule assembly; neuron cellular homeostasis; regulation of microtubule cytoskeleton organization; cellular response to calcium ion; cellular response to glucose stimulus; energy homeostasis; positive regulation of protein localization; negative regulation of tubulin deacetylation; positive regulation of peptidyl-lysine acetylation
Sources:Amigo / QuickGO
Orthologs
Species	Human	Mouse
Entrez	5562	105787
Ensembl	ENSG00000132356	ENSMUSG00000050697
UniProt	Q13131	Q5EG47
RefSeq (mRNA)	NM_006251; NM_206907	NM_001013367; NM_001355640
RefSeq (protein)	NP_006242; NP_996790; NP_001341957; NP_001341958; NP_001341963 NP_001341964; NP_001341965; NP_001341966	NP_001013385; NP_001342569
Location (UCSC)	Chr 5: 40.76 – 40.8 Mb	Chr 15: 5.17 – 5.21 Mb
PubMed search
- Wikidata
View/Edit Human	View/Edit Mouse

5'-AMP-activated protein kinase catalytic subunit alpha-1 is an enzyme that in humans is encoded by the PRKAA1 gene.

The protein encoded by this gene belongs to the serine/threonine protein kinase family. It is the catalytic subunit of the 5'-prime-AMP-activated protein kinase (AMPK). AMPK is a cellular energy sensor conserved in all eukaryotic cells. The kinase activity of AMPK is activated by the stimuli that increase the cellular AMP/ATP ratio. AMPK regulates the activities of a number of key metabolic enzymes through phosphorylation. It protects cells from stresses that cause ATP depletion by switching off ATP-consuming biosynthetic pathways. Alternatively spliced transcript variants encoding distinct isoforms have been observed. A recent study proposes a role in the metastatic cascade and phenotype determination of pancreatic cancer.

== Interactions ==
Protein kinase, AMP-activated, alpha 1 has been shown to interact with TSC2.
