= SLC2A4RG =

Protein-coding gene in the species Homo sapiens

Identifiers
- Aliases: SLC2A4RG, GEF, HDBP-1, HDBP1, Si-1-2, Si-1-2-19, SLC2A4 regulator
- External IDs: OMIM: 609493; GeneCards: SLC2A4RG

Gene location (Human)
Chr.	Chromosome 20 (human)
Band	20q13.33	Start	63,739,776 bp
Band	20q13.33	End	63,744,050 bp
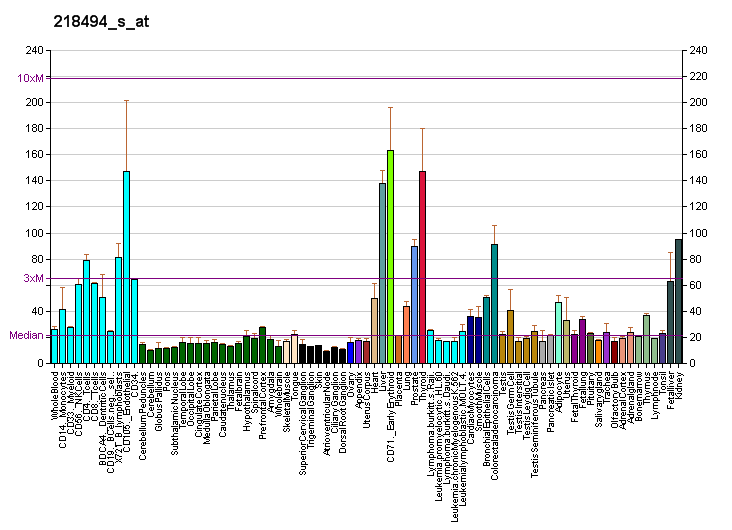
RNA expression pattern
Bgee	Human / Mouse (ortholog); Top expressed in: apex of heart; right lobe of liver; muscle of thigh; right coronary artery; popliteal artery; tibial arteries; gastric mucosa; skin of abdomen; Descending thoracic aorta; skin of leg / n/a; More reference expression data
BioGPS	More reference expression data
Gene ontology
Molecular function	DNA-binding transcription factor activity; DNA binding; metal ion binding; nucleic acid binding; cis-regulatory region sequence-specific DNA binding
Cellular component	cytoplasm; nuclear speck; nucleus
Biological process	regulation of transcription, DNA-templated; transcription, DNA-templated; regulation of transcription by RNA polymerase II
Sources:Amigo / QuickGO
Orthologs
Databases	NCBI: entry; OMA: entry
Species	Human	Mouse
Entrez	56731	n/a
Ensembl	ENSG00000125520	n/a
UniProt	Q9NR83	n/a
RefSeq (mRNA)	NM_020062	n/a
RefSeq (protein)	NP_064446	n/a
Location (UCSC)	Chr 20: 63.74 – 63.74 Mb	n/a
PubMed search		n/a
- Wikidata
View/Edit Human

SLC2A4 regulator is a protein that in humans is encoded by the SLC2A4RG gene.

The protein encoded by this gene is a nuclear transcription factor involved in the activation of the solute carrier family 2 member 4 gene. The encoded protein interacts with another transcription factor, myocyte enhancer factor 2, to activate transcription of this gene.
