= PRKAG3 =

Protein-coding gene in the species Homo sapiens

Identifiers
- Aliases: PRKAG3, AMPKG3, protein kinase AMP-activated non-catalytic subunit gamma 3, SMGMQTL
- External IDs: MGI: 1891343; HomoloGene: 23006; GeneCards: PRKAG3; OMA:PRKAG3 - orthologs

Gene location (Human)
Chr.	Chromosome 2 (human)
Band	2q35	Start	218,822,383 bp
Band	2q35	End	218,832,086 bp

Gene location (Mouse)
Chr.	Chromosome 1 (mouse)
Band	1|1 C4	Start	74,778,081 bp
Band	1|1 C4	End	74,788,380 bp
RNA expression pattern
Bgee	Human / Mouse (ortholog); Top expressed in: muscle of thigh; gastrocnemius muscle; tibialis anterior muscle; skeletal muscle tissue; Skeletal muscle tissue of rectus abdominis; quadriceps femoris muscle; vastus lateralis muscle; biceps brachii; testicle; deltoid muscle / Top expressed in: medial head of gastrocnemius muscle; triceps brachii muscle; vastus lateralis muscle; knee joint; tibialis anterior muscle; skeletal muscle tissue; muscle of thigh; sternocleidomastoid muscle; temporal muscle; ankle; More reference expression data
BioGPS	n/a
Gene ontology
Molecular function	nucleotide binding; AMP-activated protein kinase activity; ATP binding; protein kinase binding; adenyl ribonucleotide binding
Cellular component	cytosol; nucleotide-activated protein kinase complex; nucleoplasm; extracellular space
Biological process	intracellular signal transduction; lipid metabolism; fatty acid metabolic process; protein phosphorylation; fatty acid biosynthetic process; glycogen biosynthetic process; macroautophagy; regulation of signal transduction by p53 class mediator; regulation of macroautophagy; glycolytic process; response to muscle activity involved in regulation of muscle adaptation; regulation of protein serine/threonine kinase activity
Sources:Amigo / QuickGO
Orthologs
Species	Human	Mouse
Entrez	53632	241113
Ensembl	ENSG00000115592	ENSMUSG00000006542
UniProt	Q9UGI9	Q8BGM7
RefSeq (mRNA)	NM_017431	NM_153744; NM_153745
RefSeq (protein)	NP_059127	NP_714966
Location (UCSC)	Chr 2: 218.82 – 218.83 Mb	Chr 1: 74.78 – 74.79 Mb
PubMed search
- Wikidata
View/Edit Human	View/Edit Mouse

5'-AMP-activated protein kinase subunit gamma-3 is an enzyme that in humans is encoded by the PRKAG3 gene.

== Function ==
The protein encoded by this gene is a regulatory subunit of the AMP-activated protein kinase (AMPK). AMPK is a heterotrimer consisting of an alpha catalytic subunit, and non-catalytic beta and gamma subunits. AMPK is an important energy-sensing enzyme that monitors cellular energy status. In response to cellular metabolic stresses, AMPK is activated, and thus phosphorylates and inactivates acetyl-CoA carboxylase (ACC) and beta-hydroxy beta-methylglutaryl-CoA reductase (HMGCR), key enzymes involved in regulating de novo biosynthesis of fatty acid and cholesterol. This subunit is one of the gamma regulatory subunits of AMPK. It is dominantly expressed in skeletal muscle. Studies of the pig counterpart suggest that this subunit may play a key role in the regulation of energy metabolism in skeletal muscle.
