= CBS domain =

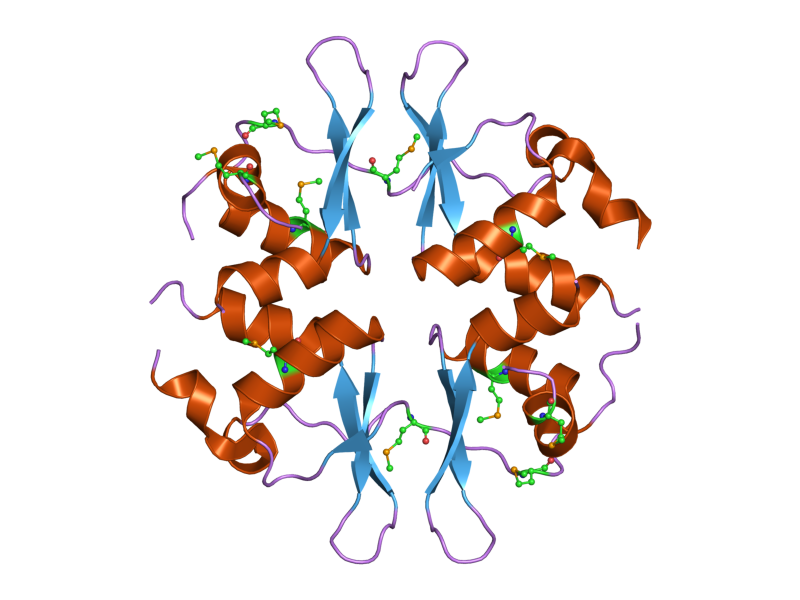
- Structure of the yeast SNF4 protein that contains four CBS domains. This protein is part of the AMP-activated protein kinase (AMPK) complex.

Identifiers
- Symbol: CBS
- Pfam: PF00571
- InterPro: IPR000644
- SMART: CBS
- PROSITE: PS51371
- SCOP2: 1zfj / SCOPe / SUPFAM
- CDD: cd02205
Available protein structures:
- PDB: 1ak5, 1b3o, 1jcn, 1jr1, 1lrt, 1me7, 1me8, 1me9, 1meh, 1mei, 1mew, 1nf7, 1nfb, 1o50, 1pbj, 1pvm, 1pvn, 1vr9, 1vrd, 1xkf, 1y5h, 1yav, 1zfj, 2cu0, 2d4z, 2ef7, 2j9l, 2nyc, 2nye, 2o16, 2oox, 2oux, 2qh1, 2rc3, 2rif, 2rih, 2v8q, 2v92, 2v9j, 2yvx, 2yzi, 2yzq, 3ddj IPR000644 PF00571 (ECOD; PDBsum)
- AlphaFold: IPR000644; PF00571

In molecular biology, the CBS domain is a protein domain found in a range of proteins in all species from bacteria to humans. It was first identified as a conserved sequence region in 1997 and named after cystathionine beta synthase, one of the proteins it is found in. CBS domains are also found in a wide variety of other proteins such as inosine monophosphate dehydrogenase, voltage gated chloride channels and AMP-activated protein kinase (AMPK). CBS domains regulate the activity of associated enzymatic and transporter domains in response to binding molecules with adenosyl groups such as AMP and ATP, or s-adenosylmethionine.

== Structure ==
The CBS domain is composed of a beta-alpha-beta-beta-alpha secondary structure pattern that is folded into a globular tertiary structure that contains a three-stranded antiparallel β-sheet with two α-helices on one side. CBS domains are always found in pairs in protein sequences and each pair of these domains tightly associate in a pseudo dimeric arrangement through their β-sheets forming a so-called CBS-pair or Bateman domain. These CBS domain pairs can associate in a head-to-head (i.e. PDB codes 3KPC, 1PVM, 2OOX) or a head-to-tail (i.e. PDB codes 1O50, 1PBJ) manner forming a disk-like compact structure. By doing so, they form clefts that constitute the canonical ligand binding regions. In principle, the number of canonical binding sites matches the number of CBS domains within the molecule and are traditionally numbered according to the CBS domain that contains each of the conserved aspartate residues that potentially interact with the ribose of the nucleotides. However, not all of these cavities might necessarily bind nucleotides or be functional. Recently, a non-canonical site for AMP has also been described in protein MJ1225 from M. jannaschii, though its functional role is still unknown.

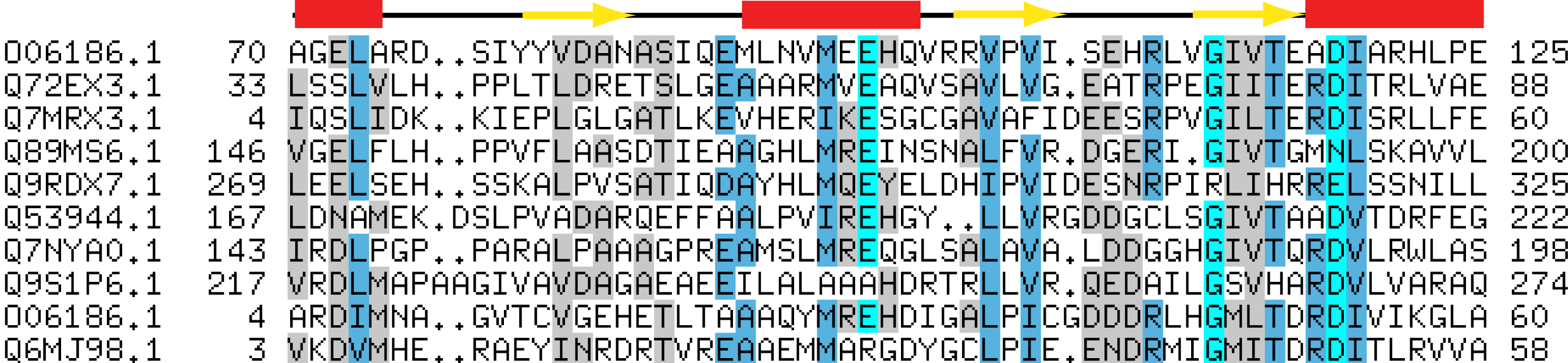
Multiple sequence alignment of CBS domains showing secondary structures above. Yellow arrows represent beta strands and red boxes alpha helices.

== Ligand binding ==
It has been shown that CBS domains bind to adenosyl groups in molecules such as AMP and ATP, or s-adenosylmethionine, but they may also bind metallic ions such as Mg^{2+}. Upon binding these different ligands the CBS domains regulate the activity of associated enzymatic domains. The molecular mechanisms underlying this regulation are just starting to be elucidated. At the moment, two different type of mechanisms have been proposed. The first one claims that the nucleotide portion of the ligand induces essentially no change in the protein structure, the electrostatic potential at the binding site being the most significant property of adenosine nucleotide binding. This "static" response would be involved in processes in which regulation by energy charge would be advantageous. On the contrary, the second type of mechanism (denoted as "dynamic") involves dramatic conformational changes in the protein structure upon ligand binding and has been reported for the cytosolic domain of the Mg^{2+} transporter MgtE from Thermus thermophilus, the unknown function protein MJ0100 from M. jannaschii and the regulatory region of Clostridium perfringens pyrophosphatase.

== Associated domains ==
CBS domains are often found in proteins that contain other domains. These domains are usually enzymatic, membrane transporters or DNA-binding domains. However, proteins that contain only CBS domains are also often found, particularly in prokaryotes. These standalone CBS domain proteins might form complexes upon binding to other proteins such as kinases to which they interact with and regulate.

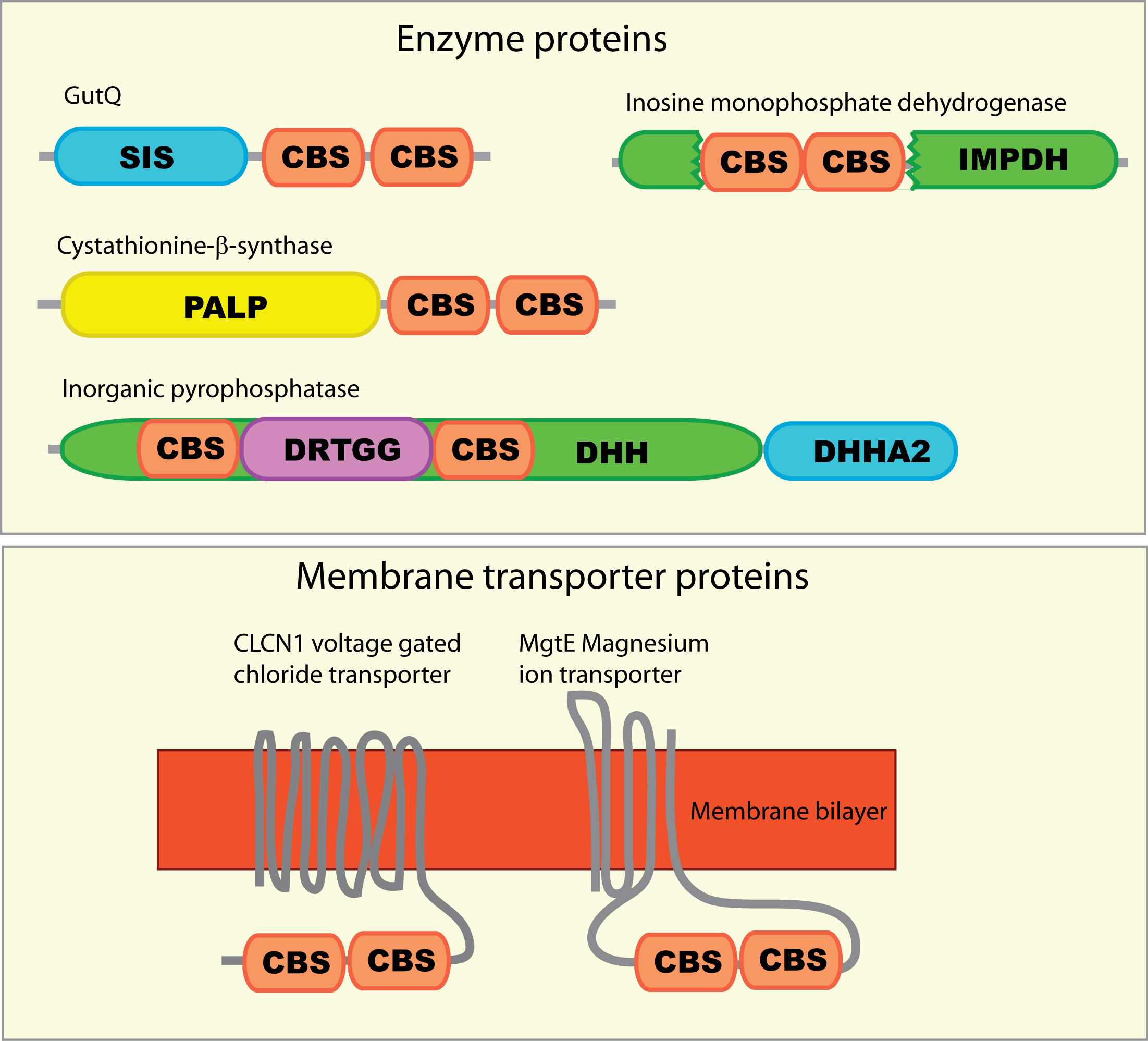
Example protein domains found associated with CBS domains

== Mutations leading to disease ==
Mutations in some human CBS domain-containing proteins leads to genetic diseases. For example, mutations in the cystathionine beta synthase protein lead to an inherited disorder of the metabolism called homocystinuria (OMIM: 236200). Mutations in the gamma subunit of the AMPK enzyme have been shown to lead to familial hypertrophic cardiomyopathy with Wolff–Parkinson–White syndrome (OMIM: 600858). Mutations in the CBS domains of the IMPDH enzyme lead to the eye condition retinitis pigmentosa (OMIM: 180105).

Humans have a number of voltage-gated chloride channel genes, and mutations in the CBS domains of several of these have been identified as the cause of genetic diseases. Mutations in CLCN1 lead to myotonia (OMIM: 160800), mutations in CLCN2 can lead to idiopathic generalised epilepsy (OMIM: 600699), mutations in CLCN5 can lead to Dent's disease (OMIM: 300009), mutations in CLCN7 can lead to osteopetrosis (OMIM: 259700), and mutations in CLCNKB can lead to Bartter syndrome (OMIM: 241200).
