= SonicParanoid =

SonicParanoid is an algorithm for the de-novo prediction of orthologous genes among multiple species. It borrows the main idea from InParanoid with substantial changes to the algorithm that drastically reduce the time required for the analysis. Additionally, SonicParanoid generates groups of orthologous genes shared among the input proteomes using single-linkage hierarchical clustering or markov clustering. The latest iteration of SonicParanoid uses machine learning to substantially reduce execution times, and language models to infer orthologs at the domain level.
