= AMP-activated protein kinase =

Class of enzymes

AMP-activated protein kinase (AMPK)
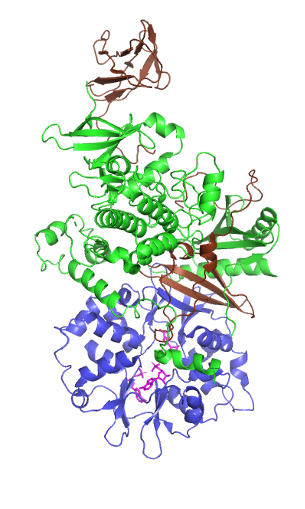
- AMP-activated protein kinase

Identifiers
- EC no.: 2.7.11.1
- CAS no.: 172522-01-9
- Alt. names: AMP-activated protein kinase

Databases
- BRENDA: enzyme data
- ExPASy: NiceZyme view
- KEGG: enzyme entry
- MetaCyc: metabolic pathway
- Rhea: reactions
- PDB structures: RCSB PDB PDBe PDBsum
- Gene Ontology: AmiGO / QuickGO
Search
- PMC: articles
- PubMed: articles
- NCBI: proteins

5' AMP-activated protein kinase or AMPK or 5' adenosine monophosphate-activated protein kinase is an enzyme (EC 2.7.11.31) that plays a role in cellular energy homeostasis, largely to activate glucose and fatty acid uptake and oxidation when cellular energy is low. It belongs to a highly conserved eukaryotic protein family and its orthologues are SNF1 in yeast, and SnRK1 in plants. It consists of three proteins (subunits) that together make a functional enzyme, conserved from yeast to humans. It is expressed in a number of tissues, including the liver, brain, and skeletal muscle. In response to binding AMP and ADP, the net effect of AMPK activation is stimulation of hepatic fatty acid oxidation, ketogenesis, stimulation of skeletal muscle fatty acid oxidation and glucose uptake, inhibition of cholesterol synthesis, lipogenesis, and triglyceride synthesis, inhibition of adipocyte lipogenesis, inhibition of adipocyte lipolysis, and modulation of insulin secretion by pancreatic β-cells.

It should not be confused with cyclic AMP-activated protein kinase (protein kinase A).

== Structure ==
AMPK is a heterotrimeric protein complex that is formed by α, β, and γ subunits. Each of these three subunits takes on a specific role in both the stability and activity of AMPK. Specifically, the γ subunit includes four particular Cystathionine-β-synthase (CBS) domains, giving AMPK its ability to sensitively detect shifts in the AMP/ATP ratio. AMPK is deactivated upon AMP displacement by ATP at CBS site 3, suggesting CBS3 to be the primary allosteric regulatory site. The four CBS domains create two binding sites for AMP commonly referred to as Bateman domains. Binding of one AMP to a Bateman domain cooperatively increases the binding affinity of the second AMP to the other Bateman domain. As AMP binds both Bateman domains the γ subunit undergoes a conformational change which exposes the catalytic domain found on the α subunit. It is in this catalytic domain where AMPK becomes activated when phosphorylation takes place at threonine-172 (on α1 isoform) or Thr-174 (on α2 isoform) by an upstream AMPK kinase (AMPKK). The α, β, and γ subunits can also be found in different isoforms: the γ subunit can exist as either the γ1, γ2 or γ3 isoform; the β subunit can exist as either the β1 or β2 isoform; and the α subunit can exist as either the α1 or α2 isoform. Although the most common isoforms expressed in most cells are the α1, β1, and γ1 isoforms, it has been demonstrated that the α2, β2, γ2, and γ3 isoforms are also expressed in cardiac and skeletal muscle.

The following human genes encode AMPK subunits:

- α – PRKAA1, PRKAA2
- β – PRKAB1, PRKAB2
- γ – PRKAG1, PRKAG2, PRKAG3

The crystal structure of mammalian AMPK regulatory core domain (α C terminal, β C terminal, γ) has been solved in complex with AMP, ADP or ATP.

== Regulation ==
Due to the presence of isoforms of its components, there are 12 versions of AMPK in mammals, each of which can have different tissue localizations, and different functions under different conditions. AMPK is regulated allosterically and by post-translational modification, which work together.

If residue Thr-172 of AMPK's α1-subunit (or Thr-174 of AMPK's α2-subunit) is phosphorylated, AMPK is activated around 100-fold; access to that residue by phosphatases is blocked if AMP or ADP can block access for and ATP can displace AMP and ADP. That residue is phosphorylated by at least three kinases (liver kinase B1 (LKB1), which works in a complex with STRAD and MO25, Calcium/calmodulin-dependent protein kinase kinase II-(CAMKK2), and TGFβ-activated kinase 1 (TAK1)) and is dephosphorylated by three phosphatases (protein phosphatase 2A (PP2A); protein phosphatase 2C (PP2C) and Mg^{2+}-/Mn^{2+}-dependent protein phosphatase 1E (PPM1E)).

Regulation of AMPK by CaMKK2 requires a direct interaction of these two proteins via their kinase domains. The interaction of CaMKK2 with AMPK only involves the α and β subunits of AMPK (AMPK γ is absent from the CaMKK2 complex), thus rendering regulation of AMPK in this context to changes in calcium levels but not AMP or ADP.

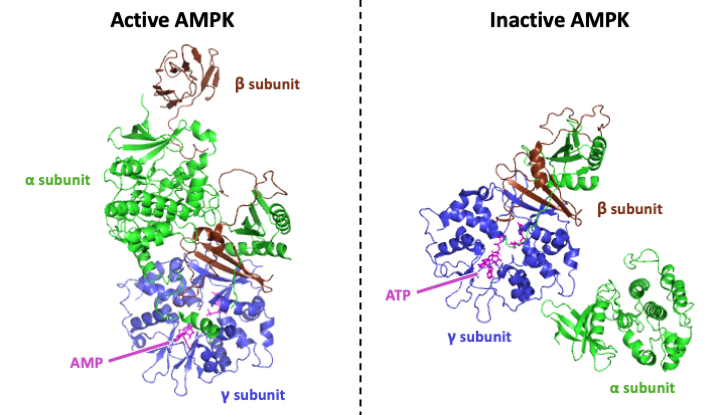
Active adenosine monophosphate-activated protein kinase (AMPK, left) and inactive AMPK (right). AMPK is a protein complex composed of three subunits: α (green), β (brown), and γ (blue). When bound to adenosine monophosphate (AMP), AMPK is activated and the active loop is protected against phosphatases. When bound to adenosine triphosphate (ATP), AMPK undergoes a large conformational change wherein part of the α subunit associates weakly with the γ subunit ~100Å away, the active loop is exposed to phosphatases, and AMPK is deactivated. PDB ID: 4RER (left) and 7M74 (right)

AMPK is regulated allosterically mostly by competitive binding to the CBS sites on its γ subunit between ATP (which allows phosphatase access to Thr-172) and AMP or ADP (each of which blocks access to phosphatases). It thus appears that AMPK is a sensor of AMP/ATP or ADP/ATP ratios and thus cell energy level. AMPK undergoes a large conformational change upon ATP binding. A region on the α subunit known as the kinase domain (KD) dissociates from its active-state conformation and loosely associates with the γ subunit ~100Å away. The KD also rotates ~180° in the conformational change. Upon KD dissociation, the active loop (AL) of the α subunit which contains the critical phosphorylated Thr residue is fully exposed to upstream phosphatases. This conformational change represents a plausible mechanism for AMPK modulation. When cellular energy states are low (high AMP/ATP or ADP/ATP levels), AMPK adopts the KD-associated conformation and AMPK is protected from dephosphorylation and remains activated. When cellular energy states are high, AMPK adopts the KD-displaced conformation, the AL is exposed to upstream phosphatases, and AMPK is deactivated.

The pharmacological compounds Merck Compound 991 and Abbott A769662 bind to the allosteric drug and metabolism site (ADaM) on the β subunit and have been shown to activate AMPK up to 10-fold. ADaM site binding may have roles in AMPK activation as well as protection against dephosphorylation.

There are other mechanisms by which AMPK is inhibited or activated by insulin, leptin, and diacylglycerol by inducing various other phosphorylations. (Note: Leptin is secreted by adipose tissue upon insulin stimulus, and it inhibits AMPk in hypothalamus (reducing appetite) but stimulates AMPk in peripheral tissues.)

AMPK may be inhibited or activated by various tissue-specific ubiquitinations.

It is also regulated by several protein-protein interactions, and may either be activated or inhibited by oxidative factors; the role of oxidation in regulating AMPK was controversial as of 2016.

== Function ==
When AMPK phosphorylates acetyl-CoA carboxylase 1 (ACC1) or sterol regulatory element-binding protein 1c (SREBP1c), it inhibits synthesis of fatty acids, cholesterol, and triglycerides, and activates fatty acid uptake and β-oxidation.

AMPK stimulates glucose uptake in skeletal muscle by phosphorylating Rab-GTPase-activating protein TBC1D1, which ultimately induces fusion of GLUT4 vesicles with the plasma membrane. AMPK stimulates glycolysis by activating phosphorylation of 6-phosphofructo-2-kinase/fructose-2,6-bisphosphatase 2/3 and activating phosphorylation of glycogen phosphorylase, and it inhibits glycogen synthesis through inhibitory phosphorylation of glycogen synthase. In the liver, AMPK inhibits gluconeogenesis by inhibiting transcription factors including hepatocyte nuclear factor 4 (HNF4) and CREB regulated transcription coactivator 2 (CRTC2).

AMPK inhibits the energy-intensive protein biosynthesis process and can also force a switch from cap-dependent translation to cap-independent translation, which requires less energy, by phosphorylation of TSC2, RPTOR, transcription initiation factor 1A.66, and eEF2K. When TSC2 is activated it inhibits mTORC1. As a result of inhibition of mTORC1 by AMPK, protein synthesis comes to a halt. Activation of AMPK signifies low energy within the cell, so all of the energy consuming pathways like protein synthesis are inhibited, and pathways that generate energy are activated to restore appropriate energy levels in the cell.

AMPK activates autophagy by directly and indirectly activating ULK1. AMPK also appears to stimulate mitochondrial biogenesis by regulating PGC-1α which in turn promotes gene transcription in mitochondria. AMPK also activates anti-oxidant defenses.

== Clinical significance ==
=== Exercise/training ===
Many biochemical adaptations of skeletal muscle that take place during a single bout of exercise or an extended duration of training, such as increased mitochondrial biogenesis and capacity, increased muscle glycogen, and an increase in enzymes which specialize in glucose uptake in cells such as GLUT4 and hexokinase II are thought to be mediated in part by AMPK when it is activated. Additionally, recent discoveries can conceivably suggest a direct AMPK role in increasing blood supply to exercised/trained muscle cells by stimulating and stabilizing both vasculogenesis and angiogenesis. Taken together, these adaptations most likely transpire as a result of both temporary and maintained increases in AMPK activity brought about by increases in the AMP:ATP ratio during single bouts of exercise and long-term training.

During a single acute exercise bout, AMPK allows the contracting muscle cells to adapt to the energy challenges by increasing expression of hexokinase II, translocation of GLUT4 to the plasma membrane, for glucose uptake, and by stimulating glycolysis. If bouts of exercise continue through a long-term training regimen, AMPK and other signals will facilitate contracting muscle adaptations by escorting muscle cell activity to a metabolic transition resulting in a fatty-acid oxidation approach to ATP generation as opposed to a glycolytic approach. AMPK accomplishes this transition to the oxidative mode of metabolism by upregulating and activating oxidative enzymes such as hexokinase II, PPAR-α, PPAR-δ, PGC-1, UCP-3, cytochrome C and TFAM.

Mutations in the skeletal muscle calcium release channel (RYR1) underlies a life- threatening response to heat in patients with malignant hyperthermia susceptibility (MHS). Upon acute exposure to heat, these mutations cause uncontrolled Ca^{2+} release from the sarcoplasmic reticulum, leading to sustained muscle contractures, severe hyperthermia, and sudden death. At basal conditions, the temperature-dependent Ca^{2+} leak also leads to increased energy demand and activation of energy sensing AMP kinase (AMPK) in skeletal muscle. The activated AMPK increases muscle metabolic activity, including glycolysis, which leads to marked elevation of circulating lactate.

AMPK activity increases with exercise and the LKB1/MO25/STRAD complex is considered to be the major upstream AMPKK of the 5’-AMP-activated protein kinase phosphorylating the α subunit of AMPK at Thr-172. This fact is puzzling considering that although AMPK protein abundance has been shown to increase in skeletal tissue with endurance training, its level of activity has been shown to decrease with endurance training in both trained and untrained tissue. Currently, the activity of AMPK immediately following a 2 hour bout of exercise of an endurance trained rat is unclear. It is possible that a direct link exists between the observed decrease in AMPK activity in endurance trained skeletal muscle and the apparent decrease in the AMPK response to exercise with endurance training.

Although AMPKα2 activation has been thought to be important for mitochondrial adaptations to exercise training, a recent study investigating the response to exercise training in AMPKα2 knockout mice opposes this idea. Their study compared the response to exercise training of several proteins and enzymes in wild type and AMPKα2 knockout mice. And even though the knockout mice had lower basal markers of mitochondrial density (COX-1, CS, and HAD), these markers increased similarly to the wild type mice after exercise training. These findings are supported by another study also showing no difference in mitochondrial adaptations to exercise training between wild type and knockout mice.

=== Maximum life span ===
The C. elegans homologue of AMPK, aak-2, has been shown by Michael Ristow and colleagues to be required for extension of life span in states of glucose restriction mediating a process named mitohormesis.

=== Lipid metabolism ===
One of the effects of exercise is an increase in fatty acid metabolism, which provides more energy for the cell. One of the key pathways in AMPK's regulation of fatty acid oxidation is the phosphorylation and inactivation of acetyl-CoA carboxylase. Acetyl-CoA carboxylase (ACC) converts acetyl-CoA to malonyl-CoA, an inhibitor of carnitine palmitoyltransferase 1 (CPT-1). CPT-1 transports fatty acids into the mitochondria for oxidation. Inactivation of ACC, therefore, results in increased fatty acid transport and subsequent oxidation. It is also thought that the decrease in malonyl-CoA occurs as a result of malonyl-CoA decarboxylase (MCD), which may be regulated by AMPK. MCD is an antagonist to ACC, decarboxylating malonyl-CoA to acetyl-CoA, resulting in decreased malonyl-CoA and increased CPT-1 and fatty acid oxidation. AMPK also plays an important role in lipid metabolism in the liver. It has long been known that hepatic ACC has been regulated in the liver by phosphorylation. AMPK also phosphorylates and inactivates 3-hydroxy-3-methylglutaryl-CoA reductase (HMGCR), a key enzyme in cholesterol synthesis. HMGR converts 3-hydroxy-3-methylglutaryl-CoA, which is made from acetyl-CoA, into mevalonic acid, which then travels down several more metabolic steps to become cholesterol. AMPK, therefore, helps regulate fatty acid oxidation and cholesterol synthesis.

=== Glucose transport ===
Insulin is a hormone which helps regulate glucose levels in the body. When blood glucose is high, insulin is released from the Islets of Langerhans. Insulin, among other things, will then facilitate the uptake of glucose into cells via increased expression and translocation of glucose transporter GLUT-4. Under conditions of exercise, however, blood sugar levels are not necessarily high, and insulin is not necessarily activated, yet muscles are still able to bring in glucose. AMPK seems to be responsible in part for this exercise-induced glucose uptake. Goodyear et al. observed that with exercise, the concentration of GLUT-4 was increased in the plasma membrane, but decreased in the microsomal membranes, suggesting that exercise facilitates the translocation of vesicular GLUT-4 to the plasma membrane. While acute exercise increases GLUT-4 translocation, endurance training will increase the total amount of GLUT-4 protein available. It has been shown that both electrical contraction and AICA ribonucleotide (AICAR) treatment increase AMPK activation, glucose uptake, and GLUT-4 translocation in perfused rat hindlimb muscle, linking exercise-induced glucose uptake to AMPK. Chronic AICAR injections, simulating some of the effects of endurance training, also increase the total amount of GLUT-4 protein in the muscle cell.

Two proteins are essential for the regulation of GLUT-4 expression at a transcriptional level – myocyte enhancer factor 2 (MEF2) and GLUT4 enhancer factor (GEF). Mutations in the DNA binding regions for either of these proteins results in ablation of transgene GLUT-4 expression. These results prompted a study in 2005 which showed that AMPK directly phosphorylates GEF, but it doesn't seem to directly activate MEF2. AICAR treatment has been shown, however, to increase transport of both proteins into the nucleus, as well as increase the binding of both to the GLUT-4 promoter region.

There is another protein involved in carbohydrate metabolism that is worthy of mention along with GLUT-4. The enzyme hexokinase phosphorylates a six-carbon sugar, most notably glucose, which is the first step in glycolysis. When glucose is transported into the cell it is phosphorylated by hexokinase. This phosphorylation keeps glucose from leaving the cell, and by changing the structure of glucose through phosphorylation, it decreases the concentration of glucose molecules, maintaining a gradient for more glucose to be transported into the cell. Hexokinase II transcription is increased in both red and white skeletal muscle upon treatment with AICAR. With chronic injections of AICAR, total protein content of hexokinase II increases in rat skeletal muscle.

=== Mitochondria ===
Mitochondrial enzymes, such as cytochrome c, succinate dehydrogenase, malate dehydrogenase, α-ketoglutarate dehydrogenase, and citrate synthase, increase in expression and activity in response to exercise. AICAR stimulation of AMPK increases cytochrome c and δ-aminolevulinate synthase (ALAS), a rate-limiting enzyme involved in the production of heme. Malate dehydrogenase and succinate dehydrogenase also increase, as well as citrate synthase activity, in rats treated with AICAR injections. Conversely, in LKB1 knockout mice, there are decreases in cytochrome c and citrate synthase activity, even if the mice are "trained" by voluntary exercise.

AMPK is required for increased peroxisome proliferator-activated receptor γ coactivator-1α (PGC-1α) expression in skeletal muscle in response to creatine depletion. PGC-1α is a transcriptional regulator for genes involved in fatty acid oxidation, gluconeogenesis, and is considered the master regulator for mitochondrial biogenesis.

To do this, it enhances the activity of transcription factors like nuclear respiratory factor 1 (NRF-1), myocyte enhancer factor 2 (MEF2), host cell factor (HCF), and others. It also has a positive feedback loop, enhancing its own expression. Both MEF2 and cAMP response element (CRE) are essential for contraction-induced PGC-1α promoter activity. LKB1 knockout mice show a decrease in PGC-1α, as well as mitochondrial proteins.

=== Thyroid hormone ===
AMPK and thyroid hormone regulate some similar processes. Knowing these similarities, Winder and Hardie et al. designed an experiment to see if AMPK was influenced by thyroid hormone. They found that all of the subunits of AMPK were increased in skeletal muscle, especially in the soleus and red quadriceps, with thyroid hormone treatment. There was also an increase in phospho-ACC, a marker of AMPK activity.

=== Glucose sensing systems ===
Loss of AMPK has been reported to alter the sensitivity of glucose sensing cells, through poorly defined mechanisms. Loss of the AMPKα2 subunit in pancreatic β-cells and hypothalamic neurons decreases the sensitivity of these cells to changes in extracellular glucose concentration. Moreover, exposure of rats to recurrent bouts of insulin induced hypoglycemia/glucopenia, reduces the activation of AMPK within the hypothalamus, whilst also suppressing the counterregulatory response to hypoglycemia. Pharmacological activation of AMPK by delivery of AMPK activating drug AICAR, directly into the hypothalamus can increase the counterregulatory response to hypoglycaemia.

=== Lysosomal damage, inflammatory diseases, and metformin ===
AMPK is recruited to lysosomes and regulated at the lysosomes via several systems of clinical significance. This includes the AXIN - LKB1 complex, acting in response to glucose limitations functioning independently of AMP sensing, which detects low glucose as absence of fructose-1,6-bisphosphate via a dynamic set of interactions between lysosomally localized V-ATPase-aldolase in contact with the endoplasmic reticulum localized TRPV. A second AMPK-control system localized to lysosomes depends on the Galectin-9-TAK1 system and ubiquitination responses at controlled by deubiquitinating enzymes such as USP9X leading to AMPK activation in response to lysosomal damage, a condition that can occur biochemically, physically via protein aggregates such as proteopathic tau in Alzheimer's disease, crystalline silica causing silicosis, cholesterol crystals causing inflammation via NLRP3 inflammasome and rupture of atherosclerotic lesions, urate crystals associated with gout, or during microbial invasion such as Mycobacterium tuberculosis or coronaviruses causing SARS. Both of the above lysosomally localized systems controlling AMPK activate it in response to metformin, a widely prescribed anti-diabetic drug.

=== Tumor suppression and promotion ===
Some evidence indicates that AMPK may have a role in tumor suppression. Studies have found that AMPK may exert most, or even all of, the tumor suppressing properties of liver kinase B1 (LKB1). Additionally, studies where the AMPK activator metformin was used to treat diabetes found a correlation with a reduced risk of cancer, compared to other medications. Gene knockout and knockdown studies with mice found that mice without the gene to express AMPK had greater risks of developing lymphomas, though as the gene was knocked out globally instead of just in B cells, it was impossible to conclude that AMP knockout had cell-autonomous effects within tumor progenitor cells.

In contrast, some studies have linked AMPK with a role as a tumor promoter by protecting cancer cells from stress. Thus, once cancerous cells have formed in an organism, AMPK may swap from protecting against cancer to protecting the cancer itself. Studies have found that tumor cells with AMPK knockout are more susceptible to death by glucose starvation or extracellular matrix detachment, which may indicate AMPK has a role in preventing these two outcomes. A recent study on pancreatic cancer suggests that AMPKα may play a role in the metastatic cascade and the phenotype of cancer cells. Mechanistically, the authors propose that in the absence of AMPKα, pancreatic cancer cells are more vulnerable to oxidative stress, supporting a tumor-promoting function of AMPKα.

== Controversy over role in adaption to exercise/training ==
A seemingly paradoxical role of AMPK occurs when we take a closer look at the energy-sensing enzyme in relation to exercise and long-term training. Similar to short-term acute training scale, long-term endurance training studies also reveal increases in oxidative metabolic enzymes, GLUT-4, mitochondrial size and quantity, and an increased dependency on the oxidation of fatty acids; however, Winder et al. reported in 2002 that despite observing these increased oxidative biochemical adaptations to long-term endurance training (similar to those mentioned above), the AMPK response (activation of AMPK with the onset of exercise) to acute bouts of exercise decreased in red quadriceps (RQ) with training (3 – see Fig.1). Conversely, the study did not observe the same results in white quadriceps (WQ) and soleus (SOL) muscles that they did in RQ. The trained rats used for that endurance study ran on treadmills 5 days/wk in two 1-h sessions, morning and afternoon. The rats were also running up to 31m/min (grade 15%). Finally, following training, the rats were sacrificed either at rest or following 10 minutes of exercise.

Because the AMPK response to exercise decreases with increased training duration, many questions arise that would challenge the AMPK role with respect to biochemical adaptations to exercise and endurance training. This is due in part to the marked increases in the mitochondrial biogenesis, upregulation of GLUT-4, UCP-3, Hexokinase II along with other metabolic and mitochondrial enzymes despite decreases in AMPK activity with training. Questions also arise because skeletal muscle cells which express these decreases in AMPK activity in response to endurance training also seem to be maintaining an oxidative dependent approach to metabolism, which is likewise thought to be regulated to some extent by AMPK activity.

If the AMPK response to exercise is responsible in part for biochemical adaptations to training, how then can these adaptations to training be maintained if the AMPK response to exercise is being attenuated with training? It is hypothesized that these adaptive roles to training are maintained by AMPK activity and that the increases in AMPK activity in response to exercise in trained skeletal muscle have not yet been observed due to biochemical adaptations that the training itself stimulated in the muscle tissue to reduce the metabolic need for AMPK activation. In other words, due to previous adaptations to training, AMPK will not be activated, and further adaptation will not occur, until the intracellular ATP levels become depleted from an even higher intensity energy challenge than prior to those previous adaptations.

== See also ==
- Salicylic acid
- Aspirin
- Salsalate
