= PRKAA2 =

Protein-coding gene in humans

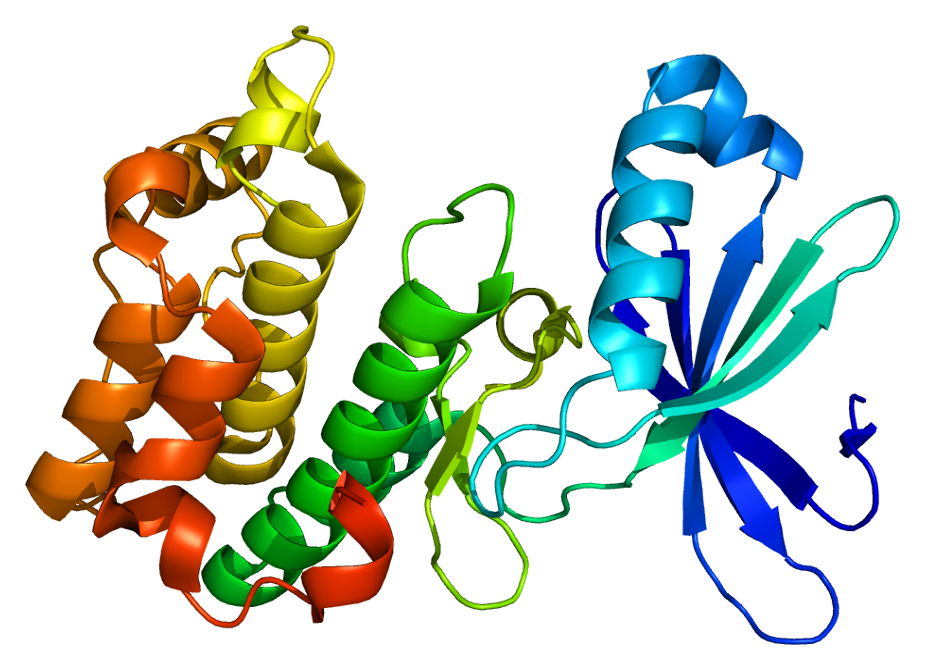

Identifiers
- Aliases: PRKAA2, AMPK, AMPK2, AMPKa2, PRKAA, protein kinase AMP-activated catalytic subunit alpha 2
- External IDs: OMIM: 600497; MGI: 1336173; GeneCards: PRKAA2
Available structures
PDB	Ortholog search: PDBe RCSB
PDB	List of PDB id codes 2H6D, 2LTU, 2YZA, 3AQV, 4CFE, 4CFF, 4ZHX, 5EZV
Enzyme activity
EC #	BRENDA	ExPASy	KEGG	MetaCyc
2.7.11.1	↗	↗	↗	↗
2.7.11.27	↗	↗	↗	↗
2.7.11.31	↗	↗	↗	↗

Gene location (Human)
Chr.	Chromosome 1 (human)
Band	1p32.2	Start	56,645,314 bp
Band	1p32.2	End	56,715,335 bp

Gene location (Mouse)
Chr.	Chromosome 4 (mouse)
Band	4|4 C6	Start	104,887,071 bp
Band	4|4 C6	End	104,967,087 bp
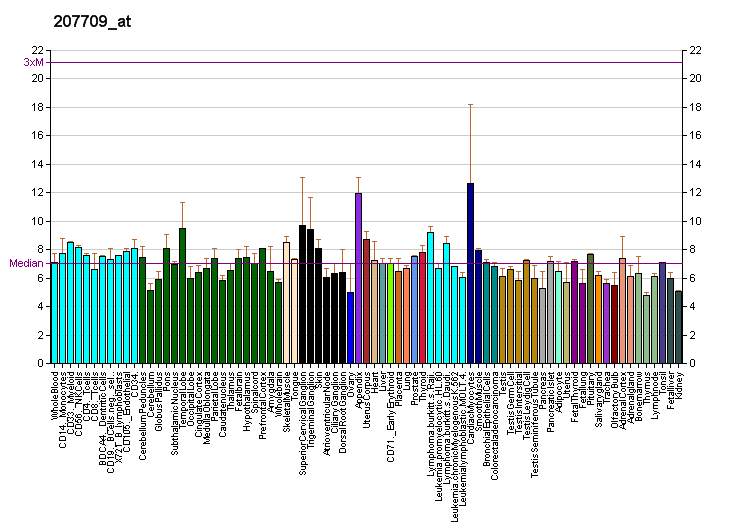
RNA expression pattern
Bgee	Human / Mouse (ortholog); Top expressed in: Skeletal muscle tissue of rectus abdominis; biceps brachii; Skeletal muscle tissue of biceps brachii; right ventricle; body of tongue; renal medulla; saphenous vein; muscle of thigh; vena cava; Brodmann area 23 / Top expressed in: triceps brachii muscle; medial head of gastrocnemius muscle; vastus lateralis muscle; sternocleidomastoid muscle; tibialis anterior muscle; knee joint; digastric muscle; temporal muscle; soleus muscle; extraocular muscle; More reference expression data
BioGPS	More reference expression data
Gene ontology
Molecular function	transferase activity; nucleotide binding; protein kinase activity; [acetyl-CoA carboxylase kinase activity]; AMP-activated protein kinase activity; histone serine kinase activity; chromatin binding; metal ion binding; kinase activity; protein serine/threonine kinase activity; protein binding; [hydroxymethylglutaryl-CoA reductase (NADPH) kinase activity]; protein serine/threonine/tyrosine kinase activity; ATP binding
Cellular component	cytoplasm; cytosol; nucleoplasm; nucleotide-activated protein kinase complex; nucleus; Golgi apparatus; nuclear speck; cytoplasmic stress granule; axon; dendrite; soma
Biological process	carnitine shuttle; steroid metabolic process; intracellular signal transduction; cellular response to glucose starvation; sterol biosynthetic process; lipid biosynthetic process; regulation of transcription, DNA-templated; glucose homeostasis; positive regulation of autophagy; phosphorylation; rhythmic process; lipid metabolism; response to stress; negative regulation of apoptotic process; cholesterol metabolic process; Wnt signaling pathway; regulation of fatty acid biosynthetic process; fatty acid metabolic process; transcription, DNA-templated; cellular response to prostaglandin E stimulus; autophagy; protein phosphorylation; negative regulation of TOR signaling; positive regulation of macroautophagy; fatty acid biosynthetic process; fatty acid homeostasis; regulation of circadian rhythm; cellular response to nutrient levels; regulation of gene expression; cholesterol biosynthetic process; response to muscle activity; positive regulation of glycolytic process; macroautophagy; signal transduction; steroid biosynthetic process; regulation of signal transduction by p53 class mediator; regulation of macroautophagy; chromatin organization; negative regulation of gene expression; cellular response to oxidative stress; regulation of stress granule assembly; regulation of microtubule cytoskeleton organization; cellular response to calcium ion; cellular response to glucose stimulus; energy homeostasis; positive regulation of protein localization; negative regulation of tubulin deacetylation; positive regulation of peptidyl-lysine acetylation
Sources:Amigo / QuickGO
Orthologs
Databases	NCBI: entry; OMA: entry
Species	Human	Mouse
Entrez	5563	108079
Ensembl	ENSG00000162409	ENSMUSG00000028518
UniProt	P54646	Q8BRK8
RefSeq (mRNA)	NM_006252	NM_178143; NM_001356568
RefSeq (protein)	NP_006243	NP_835279; NP_001343497
Location (UCSC)	Chr 1: 56.65 – 56.72 Mb	Chr 4: 104.89 – 104.97 Mb
PubMed search
- Wikidata
View/Edit Human	View/Edit Mouse

5'-AMP-activated protein kinase catalytic subunit alpha-2 is an enzyme that in humans is encoded by the PRKAA2 gene.

== Function ==
The protein encoded by this gene is a catalytic subunit of the AMP-activated protein kinase (AMPK). AMPK is a heterotrimer consisting of an alpha catalytic subunit, and non-catalytic beta and gamma subunits. AMPK is an important energy-sensing enzyme that monitors cellular energy status. In response to cellular metabolic stresses, AMPK is activated, and thus phosphorylates and inactivates acetyl-CoA carboxylase (ACC) and beta-hydroxy beta-methylglutaryl-CoA reductase (HMGCR), key enzymes involved in regulating de novo biosynthesis of fatty acid and cholesterol. Studies of the mouse counterpart suggest that this catalytic subunit may control whole-body insulin sensitivity and is necessary for maintaining myocardial energy homeostasis during ischemia.
