= PhEVER =

Content
- Description: virus-host evolutionary relationships.

Contact
- Laboratory: CNRS, UMR5558, Laboratoire de Biométrie et Biologie Evolutive, PRABI
- Authors: Leonor Palmeira
- Primary citation: Palmeira & al. (2011)
- Release date: 2010

Access
- Website: http://pbil.univ-lyon1.fr/databases/phever/

PhEVER is a database of homologous gene families between viral sequences and sequences from cellular organisms.

== See also ==
- Phylogenetics
