= TreeFam =

Content
- Description: curated database of phylogenetic trees of animal gene families.

Contact
- Research center: Wellcome Trust Sanger Institute
- Authors: Fabian Schreiber
- Primary citation: Ruan J & al. (2006)

Access
- Website: TreeFam at the Wayback Machine (archived March 7, 2026)

TreeFam (Tree families database) is a database of phylogenetic trees of animal genes. It aims at developing a curated resource that gives reliable information about ortholog and paralog assignments, and evolutionary history of various gene families.

TreeFam defines a gene family as a group of genes that evolved after the speciation of single-metazoan animals. It also tries to include outgroup genes like yeast (S.cerevisiae and S. pombe) and plant (A. thaliana) to reveal these distant members.

TreeFam is also an ortholog database. Unlike other pairwise alignment based ones, TreeFam infers orthologs by means of gene trees. It fits a gene tree into the universal species tree and finds historical duplications, speciations and losses events. TreeFam uses this information to evaluate tree building, guide manual curation, and infer complex ortholog and paralog relations.

The basic elements of TreeFam are gene families that can be divided into two parts: TreeFam-A and TreeFam-B families. TreeFam-B families are automatically created. They might contain errors given complex phylogenies. TreeFam-A families are manually curated from TreeFam-B ones. Family names and node names are assigned at the same time. The ultimate goal of TreeFam is to present a curated resource for all the families.

TreeFam is being run as a project at the Wellcome Trust Sanger Institute, and its software is housed on SourceForge as "TreeSoft".

== See also ==
- Homology (biology)
- HomoloGene
- Phylogenetics
- OrthoDB
- Orthologous MAtrix (OMA)
- Inparanoid
