= Dephospho-(reductase kinase) kinase =

Class of enzymes

dephospho-[reductase kinase] kinase

Identifiers
- EC no.: 2.7.11.3
- CAS no.: 72060-33-4

Databases
- IntEnz: IntEnz view
- BRENDA: BRENDA entry
- ExPASy: NiceZyme view
- KEGG: KEGG entry
- MetaCyc: metabolic pathway
- PRIAM: profile
- PDB structures: RCSB PDB PDBe PDBsum
- Gene Ontology: AmiGO / QuickGO
Search
- PMC: articles
- PubMed: articles
- NCBI: proteins

In enzymology, a dephospho-[reductase kinase] kinase (EC 2.7.11.3) is an enzyme that catalyzes the chemical reaction

ATP + dephospho-{[hydroxymethylglutaryl-CoA reductase (NADPH)] kinase} $\rightleftharpoons$ ADP + {[hydroxymethylglutaryl-CoA reductase (NADPH)] kinase}

Thus, the two substrates of this enzyme are ATP and [[dephospho-{[hydroxymethylglutaryl-CoA reductase (NADPH)] kinase}]], whereas its two products are ADP and [[{[hydroxymethylglutaryl-CoA reductase (NADPH)] kinase}]].

This enzyme belongs to the family of transferases, specifically those transferring a phosphate group to the sidechain oxygen atom of serine or threonine residues in proteins (protein-serine/threonine kinases). The systematic name of this enzyme class is ATP:dephospho-{[hydroxymethylglutaryl-CoA reductase (NADPH)] kinase} phosphotransferase. Other names in common use include AMP-activated kinase, AMP-activated protein kinase kinase, hydroxymethylglutaryl coenzyme A reductase kinase kinase, hydroxymethylglutaryl coenzyme A reductase kinase kinase, (phosphorylating), reductase kinase, reductase kinase kinase, and STK30.
