= Isoform =

Different products from the same gene

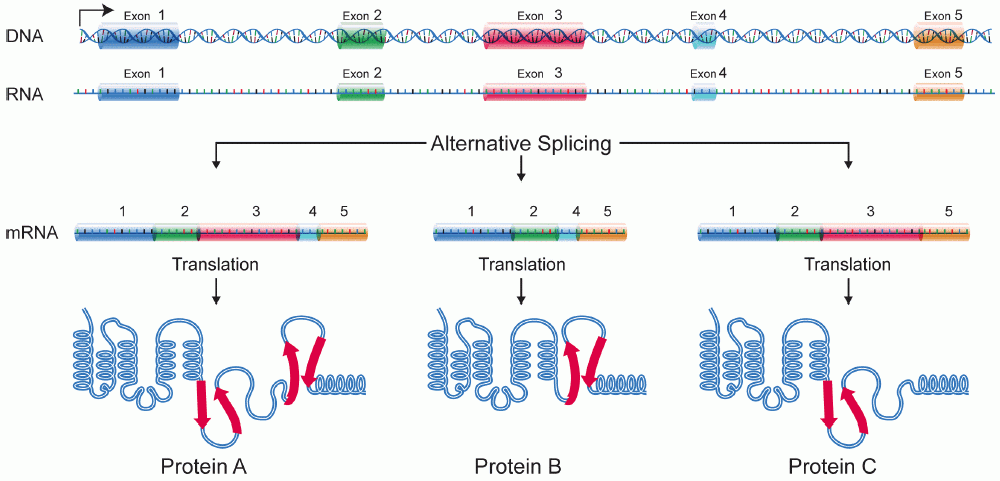
Protein A, B and C are isoforms encoded from the same gene through alternative splicing.

In genetics, an isoform is a member of a set of similar products that originate from the same gene; such a set can consist of mRNAs or their resultant proteins. The best-studied isoforms are the protein isoforms, or "protein variants", resulting from differences in the coding DNA sequences (CDS) of their precursor mRNAs. While many perform the same or similar biological roles, some protein isoforms have unique functions. A set of protein isoforms may be formed from alternative splicings, variable promoter/transcription start site (TSS) usage, or other post-transcriptional modifications of a single gene; post-translational modifications are generally not considered. (For that, see Proteoforms.) Through RNA splicing mechanisms, mRNA has the ability to select different protein-coding segments (exons) of a gene, or even different parts of exons from RNA to form different mRNA sequences. Each unique sequence produces a specific form of a protein.

The discovery of isoforms could explain the discrepancy between the small number of protein coding regions of genes revealed by the Human Genome Project and the large diversity of proteins seen in an organism: different proteins encoded by the same gene could increase the diversity of the proteome. Isoforms at the protein level can manifest in the deletion of whole domains or shorter loops, usually located on the surface of the protein.

Isoforms at the RNA level are readily characterized by cDNA transcript and RNA-Seq studies. Many human genes possess confirmed alternative splicing isoforms. It has been estimated that ~100,000 expressed sequence tags (ESTs) can be identified in humans. Isoforms harboring changes in the CDS have been the most thoroughly characterized because they commonly give rise to proteins with different functional properties. RNA isoforms can differ not only in the CDS (leading to the well-known differences in resultant proteins), but also in their untranslated regions (UTRs), which regulate the levels of primary transcript in numerous ways: transcript stability, folding and turnover, as well as translation efficiency. UTRs are often the target of miRNA, which typically downregulate transcript expression by triggering degradation or halting translation. As a result, the UTR can determine how much of a transcript is translated.

In outdated usage, isoforms is also used as a vague synonym for paralogs, the products of different genes from the same organism that are related by an ancient gene duplication. For example, PRKAA1 and PRKAA2 are paralogs, but many sources simply refer to them as "isoforms".

== Definition ==
One single gene has the ability to produce multiple RNAs (and thus proteins) that differ both in structure and composition; this process is regulated by the alternative splicing of mRNA, though it is not clear to what extent such a process affects the diversity of the human proteome, as the abundance of mRNA transcript isoforms does not necessarily correlate with the abundance of protein isoforms. Three-dimensional protein structure comparisons can be used to help determine which, if any, isoforms represent functional protein products, and the structure of most isoforms in the human proteome has been predicted by AlphaFold and publicly released at isoform.io. The specificity of translated isoforms is derived by the protein's structure/function, as well as the cell type and developmental stage during which they are produced. Determining specificity becomes more complicated when a protein has multiple subunits and each subunit has multiple isoforms.

== Mechanism ==
The primary mechanisms that produce protein isoforms are alternative splicing and variable promoter usage, though modifications due to genetic changes, such as mutations and polymorphisms are sometimes also considered distinct isoforms.

=== Alternative splicing ===
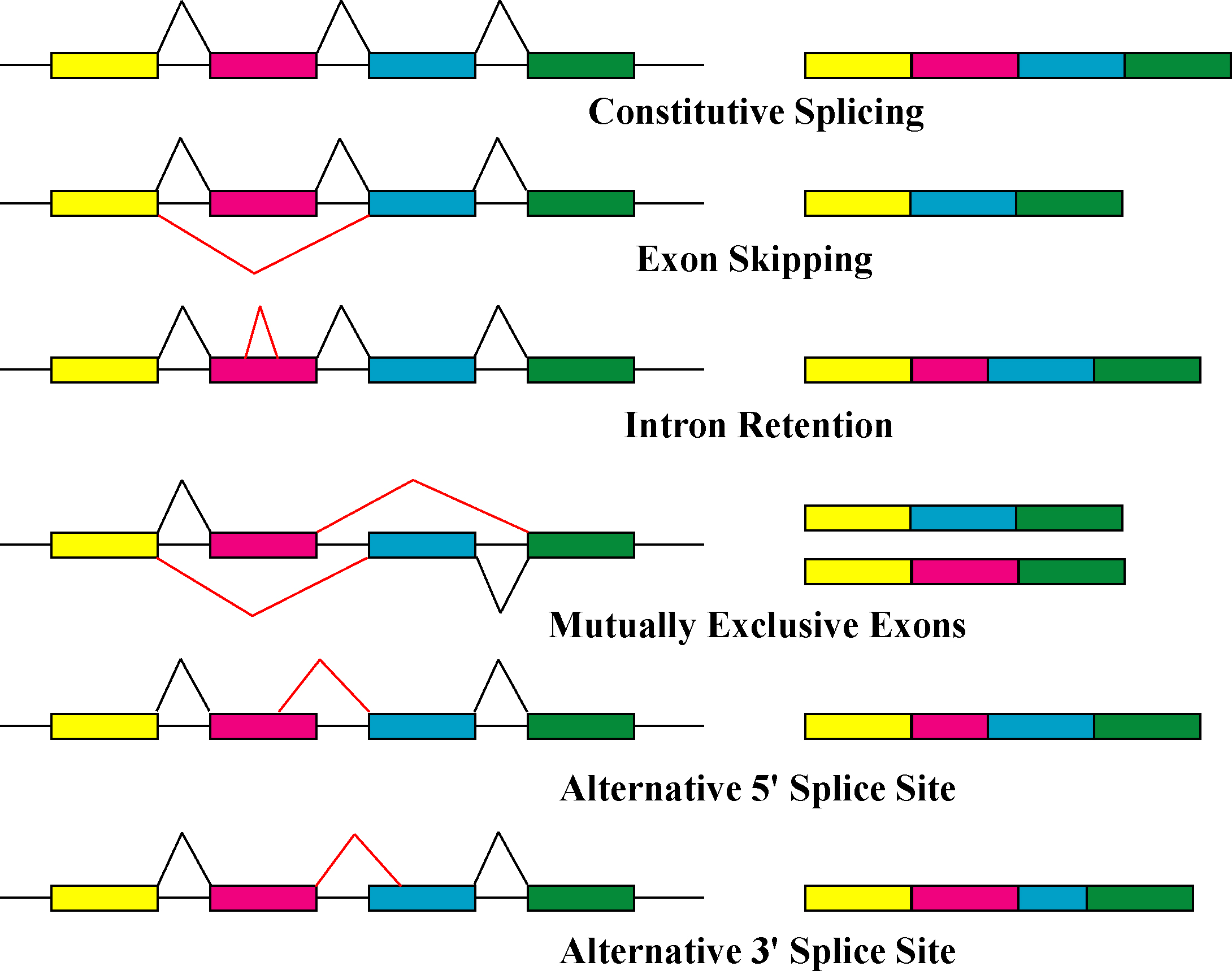
Different mechanisms of RNA splicing

Alternative splicing is the main post-transcriptional modification process that produces mRNA transcript isoforms, and is a major molecular mechanism that may contribute to protein diversity. The spliceosome, a large ribonucleoprotein, is the molecular machine inside the nucleus responsible for RNA cleavage and ligation, removing non-protein coding segments (introns).

Because splicing is a process that occurs between transcription and translation, its primary effects have mainly been studied through genomics techniques—for example, microarray analyses and RNA sequencing have been used to identify alternatively spliced transcripts and measure their abundances. Transcript abundance is often used as a proxy for the abundance of protein isoforms, though proteomics experiments using gel electrophoresis and mass spectrometry have demonstrated that the correlation between transcript and protein counts is often low, and that one protein isoform is usually dominant. One 2015 study states that the cause of this discrepancy likely occurs after translation, though the mechanism is essentially unknown. Consequently, although alternative splicing has been implicated as an important link between variation and disease, there is no conclusive evidence that it acts primarily by producing novel protein isoforms.

Alternative splicing generally describes a tightly regulated process in which alternative transcripts are intentionally generated by the splicing machinery. However, such transcripts are also produced by splicing errors in a process called "noisy splicing," and are also potentially translated into protein isoforms. Although ~95% of multi-exonic genes are thought to be alternatively spliced, one study on noisy splicing observed that most of the different low-abundance transcripts are noise, and predicts that most alternative transcript and protein isoforms present in a cell are not functionally relevant.

=== Promoter usage ===
Other transcriptional and post-transcriptional regulatory steps can also produce different protein isoforms. Variable promoter usage occurs when the transcriptional machinery of a cell (RNA polymerase, transcription factors, and other enzymes) begin transcription at different promoters—the region of DNA near a gene that serves as an initial binding site—resulting in slightly modified transcripts and protein isoforms.

Cis-regulatory elements in the promoter contain sequences recognized by transcription factors and the basal transcription machinery. So the location of the TSS is important for understanding the biogenesis of specific isoforms. The idea that different binding partners confer different functional properties has been well studied in tissue-specific gene regulation. For example, the same transcription factor (TF) can direct gene expression in different tissues simply by binding with different TSSs in each tissue.

== Characteristics ==
Generally, one protein isoform is labeled as the canonical sequence based on criteria such as its prevalence and similarity to orthologous—or functionally analogous—sequences in other species. The corresponding mRNA may be labelled as the "canonical transcript".

Isoforms are assumed to have similar functional properties, as most have similar sequences, and share some to most exons with the canonical sequence. However, some isoforms show much greater divergence (for example, through trans-splicing), and can share few to no exons with the canonical sequence. In addition, they can have different biological effects—for example, in an extreme case, the function of one isoform can promote cell survival, while another promotes cell death—or can have similar basic functions but differ in their sub-cellular localization. A 2016 study, however, functionally characterized all the isoforms of 1,492 genes and determined that most isoforms behave as "functional alloforms." The authors came to the conclusion that isoforms behave like distinct proteins after observing that the functional of most isoforms did not overlap. Because the study was conducted on cells in vitro, it is not known if the isoforms in the expressed human proteome share these characteristics. Additionally, because the function of each isoform must generally be determined separately, most identified and predicted isoforms still have unknown functions.

== Types ==
Isoforms can be categorized based on the nature of their differences into structural isoforms and sequence isoforms. Structural isoforms arise from alternative splicing events that result in different exon compositions, including exon skipping/inclusion, alternative 5' or 3' splice sites, and intron retention. These mechanisms produce transcripts and proteins with distinct domain architectures - for example, the inclusion or exclusion of entire functional domains, or the use of alternative donor/acceptor sites that add or remove partial exon sequences. In contrast, sequence isoforms typically result from single nucleotide variations, insertions, deletions, or post-translational modifications that alter the amino acid sequence without changing the overall exon structure.

Alternative splicing is the main post-transcriptional modification process that produces mRNA transcript isoforms, while isoforms can result in different functions, activities, or expression patterns. The distinction is functionally important: structural isoforms often exhibit dramatically different properties due to the presence or absence of entire protein domains, whereas sequence isoforms may show more subtle functional variations. Both mechanisms contribute significantly to proteome diversity, with structural variation through alternative splicing being particularly prevalent in higher eukaryotes where it affects the majority of multi-exon genes.

== Related concepts ==
=== Glycoform ===
A glycoform is an isoform of a protein that differs only with respect to the number or type of attached glycan. Glycoproteins often consist of a number of different glycoforms, with alterations in the attached saccharide or oligosaccharide. These modifications may result from differences in biosynthesis during the process of glycosylation, or due to the action of glycosidases or glycosyltransferases. Glycoforms may be detected through detailed chemical analysis of separated glycoforms, but more conveniently detected through differential reaction with lectins, as in lectin affinity chromatography and lectin affinity electrophoresis. Typical examples of glycoproteins consisting of glycoforms are the blood proteins as orosomucoid, antitrypsin, and haptoglobin. An unusual glycoform variation is seen in neuronal cell adhesion molecule, NCAM involving polysialic acids, PSA.

== Examples ==
=== ATF3 ===
Activating transcription factor 3 (Atf3) is a known RAG with numerous promoters. Atf3 expression increases after nerve injury and overexpression of a constitutively active form of Atf3 increases the rate of peripheral nerve regeneration. Four Atf3 isoforms were identified in dorsal root ganglia (DRG) so far. These four isoforms differ in TSS, and one differs in the CDS. However it is unclear which promoters are in use in regenerating DRG neurons.

=== PTEN ===
Phosphatase and tensin homolog (Pten) is originally identified as a tumor suppressor gene. Recent studies found that Pten also suppressed axon regeneration in retinal ganglion cells, corticospinal tract, and DRG neurons. So far 3 Pten isoforms (Pten, PtenJ1, and Pten J2) have been identified and analyzed. Pten J1 is identical in sequence to the conventional Pten isoform except for a difference in TSS and a small shift in the CDS. Pten J2 has a truncated CDS, an alternative transcription start site and a longer 3' UTR compared to the conventional Pten isoform expressed within neurons. The truncated CDS encodes a protein that lacks a phosphate domain. Also, overexpression of Pten J2 and Pten in primary cortical neurons does not influence axon regeneration. So it's hypothesized that Pten J2 works as regulatory RNA to inhibit the activity of Pten.

=== Additional studies ===
Recently some progress has been made to characterize known isoforms of regeneration associated genes (RAGs) using RNA-Seq, which is important in understanding the isoform diversity in the CNS.

== See also ==
- Gene isoform
