= OrthoDB =

Catalogue of protein-coding genes

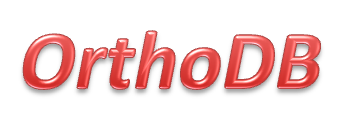

Content
- Description: Catalog of Orthologs.

Contact
- Research center: Swiss Institute of Bioinformatics
- Laboratory: Computational Evolutionary Genomics Group
- Authors: Evgenia V. Kriventseva
- Primary citation: Kriventseva et al. (2015)
- Release date: 2007

Access
- Website: www.orthodb.org
- Download URL: https://www.orthodb.org/?page=filelist
- Sparql endpoint: sparql.orthodb.org/sparql

Miscellaneous
- License: CC-BY-3.0

OrthoDB presents a catalog of orthologous protein-coding genes across vertebrates, arthropods, fungi, plants, and bacteria. Orthology refers to the last common ancestor of the species under consideration, and thus OrthoDB explicitly delineates orthologs at each major radiation along the species phylogeny. The database of orthologs presents available protein descriptors, together with Gene Ontology and InterPro attributes, which serve to provide general descriptive annotations of the orthologous groups, and facilitate comprehensive orthology database querying. OrthoDB also provides computed evolutionary traits of orthologs, such as gene duplicability and loss profiles, divergence rates, sibling groups, and gene intron-exon architectures.

In comparative genomics, the importance of scale cannot be underestimated. As gene orthology delineation requires specific expertise and considerable computational resources, scale is something that individual non-specialist research groups cannot accomplish on their own. This challenging task is achieved by OrthoDB, with very comprehensive sets of species and several unique features such as the extensive functional and evolutionary annotations of orthologous groups, with the integration of many useful links to other world-leading databases that focus on capturing information about gene function. No genome can exist as a useful data source without extensive comparative analyses with other genomes – OrthoDB provides a critically important resource for comparative genomics for the entire community of researchers from those interested in grand evolutionary questions to those focused on the specific biological functions of individual genes.

== Methodology ==
Orthology is defined relative to the last common ancestor of the species being considered, thereby determining the hierarchical nature of orthologous classifications. This is explicitly addressed in OrthoDB by application of the orthology delineation procedure at each major radiation point of the considered phylogeny. The OrthoDB implementation employs a Best-Reciprocal-Hit (BRH) clustering algorithm based on all-against-all Smith–Waterman protein sequence comparisons. Gene set pre-processing selects the longest protein-coding transcript of alternatively spliced genes and of very similar gene copies. The procedure triangulates BRHs to progressively build the clusters and requires an overall minimum sequence alignment overlap to avoid domain walking. These core clusters are further expanded to include all more closely related within-species in-paralogs, and the previously identified very similar gene copies.

== Data content ==
The database contains some 600 eukaryotic species and more than 3600 bacteria sourced from Ensembl, UniProt, NCBI, FlyBase, and several other databases. The ever-increasing sampling of sequenced genomes brings a clearer account of the majority of gene genealogies that will facilitate informed hypotheses of gene function in newly sequenced genomes.

Examples of studies that have employed data from OrthoDB include comparative analyses of gene repertoire evolution, comparisons of fruit fly and mosquito developmental genes, analyses of bloodmeal- or infection-induced changes in gene expression in mosquitoes, analysis of the evolution of mammalian milk production, and mosquito gene and genome evolution. Others studies citing OrthoDB can be found at PubMed and Google Scholar.

== Performance ==
OrthoDB has performed consistently well in benchmarking assessments alongside other orthology delineation procedures. Results were compared to reference trees for three well-conserved protein families, and to a larger set of curated protein families.

== BUSCO ==
Benchmarking sets of Universal Single-Copy Orthologs - Orthologous groups are selected from OrthoDB for the root-level classifications of arthropods, vertebrates, metazoans, fungi, and other major clades. Groups are required to contain single-copy orthologs in at least 90% of the species (in others they may be lost or duplicated), and the missing species cannot all be from the same clade. Species with frequent losses or duplications are removed from the selection unless they hold a key position in the phylogeny. BUSCOs are therefore expected to be found as single-copy orthologs in any newly sequenced genome from the appropriate phylogenetic clade, and can be used to analyse newly sequenced genomes to assess their relative completeness. The BUSCO assessment tool and datasets (accessible here) are being widely used in many genomics projects, with most journal editors now requiring such quality assessments before accepting new genome publications.

== See also ==
- Homology (biology)
- Phylogeny
- List of biological databases
