= Orthologous MAtrix =

OMA

Content
- Description: orthology inference among 1000 complete genomes.

Contact
- Laboratory: ETH Zurich
- Authors: Christophe Dessimoz; Adrian Schneider; Adrian Altenhoff; Gaston H. Gonnet
- Primary citation: Altenhoff et al.
- Release date: 2004

Access
- Website: omabrowser.org
- Download URL: http://omabrowser.org/All/download.html
- Web service URL: wsdl

Miscellaneous
- Data release frequency: 2 releases per year

OMA (Orthologous MAtrix) is a database of orthologs extracted from available complete genomes. The orthology predictions of OMA are available in several forms:

- OMA Pairs: for a given gene, a list of predicted orthologs in other species is provided.
- OMA Groups: a set of genes across different species which are all orthologous.
- OMA Hierarchical Groups: the set of all genes that have evolved from a single ancestral gene in a given taxonomic range.
- OMA Genome Pair view: the list of all predicted orthologs between two species.

== See also ==
- Homology (biology)
- OrthoDB
- TreeFam
