= Galectin =

Protein family binding to β-galactoside sugars

Structure of human galectin-9 in complex with N-acetyllactosamine dimer, clearly showing the two carbohydrate binding sites

Galectins are a class of proteins that bind specifically to β-galactoside sugars, such as N-acetyllactosamine (Galβ1-3GlcNAc or Galβ1-4GlcNAc), which can be bound to proteins by either N-linked or O-linked glycosylation. They are also termed S-type lectins due to their dependency on disulphide bonds for stability and carbohydrate binding. There have been about 15 galectins discovered in mammals, encoded by the LGALS genes, which are numbered in a consecutive manner. Only galectin-1, -2, -3, -4, -7, -7B, -8, -9, -9B, 9C, -10, -12, -13, -14, and -16 have been identified in humans. Galectin-5 and -6 are found in rodents, whereas galectin-11 and -15 are uniquely found in sheep and goats. Members of the galectin family have also been discovered in other mammals, birds, amphibians, fish, nematodes, sponges, and some fungi. Unlike the majority of lectins they are not membrane bound, but soluble proteins with both intra- and extracellular functions. They have distinct but overlapping distributions but found primarily in the cytosol, nucleus, extracellular matrix or in circulation. Although many galectins must be secreted, they do not have a typical signal peptide required for classical secretion. The mechanism and reason for this non-classical secretion pathway is unknown.

== Structure ==
The basic cartoon structures of dimeric, tandem and chimeric galectins. Dimeric galectins consist of two of the same subunit that have associated with one another. Tandem galectins have two distinct CRDs linked via a linker peptide domain. Chimera galectins, which consist of only galectin-3 in vertebrates, can exist as a monomer or in a multivalent form. Here it is expressed as a pentamer.

There are three different forms of galectin structure: dimeric, tandem or chimera. Dimeric galectins, also called prototypical galectins, are homodimers, consisting of two identical galectin subunits that have associated with one another. The galectins that fall under this category are galectin-1, -2, -5, -7, -10, -11, -14 and -15. Tandem galectins contain at least two distinct carbohydrate recognition domains (CRD) within one polypeptide, thus are considered intrinsically divalent. The CRDs are linked with a small peptide domain. Tandem galectins include galectin-4, -6, -8, -9 and -12. The final galectin is galectin-3 which is the only galectin found in the chimera category in vertebrates. Galectin-3 has one CRD and a long non-lectin domain. Galectin-3 can exist in monomeric form or can associate via the non-lectin domain into multivalent complexes up to a pentameric form. This allows galectin-3 to bridge effectively between different ligands and form adhesive networks. The formation of multimers is concentration dependent. When Galectin-3 is at a low concentration it is monomeric and likely to inhibit adhesion. It binds to adhesion proteins such as integrins and blocks further binding to other cells or the extracellular matrix. When concentrations of galectin-3 are high it forms large complexes that assist in adhesion by bridging between cells or cells and the extracellular matrix. Many isoforms of galectins have been found due to different splicing variants. For example, Galectin-8 has seven different mRNAs encoding for both tandem and dimeric forms. The type of galectin-8 that is expressed is dependent on the tissue. Galectin-9 has three different isoforms which differ in the length of the linker region.

The galectin carbohydrate recognition domain (CRD) is constructed from beta-sheet of about 135 amino acids. The two sheets are slightly bent with 6 strands forming the concave side and 5 strands forming the convex side. The concave side forms a groove in which the carbohydrate ligand can bind, and which is long enough to hold about a linear tetrasaccharide.

=== Ligand binding ===
Galectins essentially bind to glycans featuring galactose and its derivatives. However, physiologically, they are likely to require lactose or N-acetyllactosamine for significantly strong binding. Generally, the longer the sugar the stronger the interactions. For example, galectin-9 binds to polylactosamine chains with stronger affinity than to an N-acetyllactosamine monomer. This is because more Van der Waals interactions can occur between sugar and binding pocket. Carbohydrate binding is calcium independent, unlike C-type lectins. The strength of ligand binding is determined by a number of factors: The multivalency of both of ligand and the galectin, the length of the carbohydrate and the mode of presentation of ligand to carbohydrate recognition domain. Different galectins have distinct binding specificities for binding oligosaccharides depending on the tissue in which they are expressed and the function that they possess. However, in each case, galactose is essential for binding. Crystallisation experiments of galectins in complex with N-acetyllactosamine show that binding arises due to hydrogen bonding interactions from the carbon-4 and carbon-6 hydroxyl groups of galactose and carbon-3 of N-acetylglucosamine (GlcNAc) to the side chains of amino acids in the protein. They cannot bind to other sugars such as mannose because this sugar will not fit inside the carbohydrate recognition domain without steric hindrance. Due to the nature of the binding pocket, galectins can bind terminal sugars or internal sugars within a glycan. This allows bridging between two ligands on the same cell or between two ligands on different cells.

== Function ==
Galectins are a large family with relatively broad specificity. Thus, they have a broad variety of functions including mediation of cell–cell interactions, cell–matrix adhesion and transmembrane signalling. Their expression and secretion is well regulated, suggesting they may be expressed at different times during development. There are no serious defects when individual galectin genes are deleted in knock-out mouse models. This is because there is substantial overlap for the essential functions. The list of functions for galectins is extensive and it is unlikely they have all been discovered. A handful of the main functions are described below.

=== Apoptosis ===
Galectins are distinct in that they can regulate cell death both intracellularly and extracellularly. Extracellularly, they cross link glycans on the outside of cells and transduce signals across the membrane to directly cause cell death or activate downstream signaling that triggers apoptosis. Intracellularly, they can directly regulate proteins that control cell fate. Many galectins have roles in apoptosis:

- One essential way galectins regulate apoptosis is to control positive and negative selection of T cells in the thymus. This process prevents the circulation of T cells that are self-reactive and recognise self antigen. Both galectin-1 and galectin-9 are secreted by epithelial cells in the thymus and mediate T cell apoptosis. T cell death is also necessary to kill activated and infected T cells after an immune response. This is also mediated by galectin-1 and galectin-9. Galectin-1 binds many proteins on the T cell surface, but specifically CD7, CD43 and CD45 are involved in apoptosis.
- Galectin-7 is expressed under the p53 promoter and may have a key role in regulating apoptosis of keratinocytes after DNA damage, such as that caused by UV radiation.
- Galectin-12 expression induces apoptosis of adipocytes.
- Galectin-3 has been shown to be the only galectin with anti-apoptotic activity, proven by knock-out in mice increasing rates of apoptosis. Intracellularly, galectin-3 can associate with Bcl-2 proteins, an antiapoptotic family of proteins, and thus may enhance Bcl-2 binding to the target cell. On the other hand, galectin-3 can also be pro-apoptotic and mediate T cell and neutrophil death.

=== Embryonic development ===
The interaction of galectin-1 and galectin-8, produced by avian limb bud mesenchymal cells, plays a key role in mediating the development of the vertebrate limb skeleton. These proteins interact with the cells and with one another through a reaction-diffusion-adhesion mechanism, which promotes the patterning and structural organization of the developing limb. Phylogenomic analysis suggests that evolutionary modifications of each of these proteins and the acquisition of new regulatory sequences were responsible for morphological transformations, including the fin-limb transition.

=== Suppression of T-cell receptor activation ===
Galectin-3 has an essential role in negatively regulating T cell receptor (TCR) activation. Crosslinking of T cell receptors and other glycoproteins by galectin-3 on the membrane of T cells prevents clustering of TCRs and ultimately suppresses activation. This prevents auto-activation. Experiments in transgenic mice with deficient N-acetylglucosamine transferase V (GnTV) have increased susceptibility to autoimmune diseases. GnTV is the enzyme required to synthesise polylactosamine chains, which are the ligand for galectin-3 on T cell receptors. This knock-out means galectin-3 cannot prevent auto-activation of TCR so T cells are hypersensitive. Also within the immune system, galectins have been proven to act as chemoattractants to immune cells and activate secretion of inflammatory cytokines.

=== Adhesion ===
Galectins can both promote and inhibit integrin-mediated adhesion. To enhance integrin-mediated adhesion, they cross link between two glycans on different cells. This brings the cells closer together so integrin binding occurs. They can also hinder adhesion by binding to two glycans on the same cell, which blocks the integrin binding site. Galectin-8 is specific for the glycans bound to integrin and has a direct role in adhesion as well as activating integrin-specific signaling cascades.

=== Nuclear pre-mRNA splicing ===
Galectin-1 and galectin-3 have been found, surprisingly, to associate with nuclear ribonucleoprotein complexes including the spliceosome. Studies revealed that galectin-1 and -3 are required splicing factors, since removal of the galectins by affinity chromatography with lactose resulted in loss of splicing activity. It appears that the splicing capability of galectins is independent of their sugar-binding specificities. Site-directed mutagenesis studies to the carbohydrate recognition domain removes glycan binding but does not prevent association with the spliceosome.

=== Galectins in control of ESCRT, mTOR, AMPK, and autophagy ===
Cytoplasmic galectin-8 and galectin-9 have been shown to control mTOR (mTORC1) and PRKAA (AMPK) in response to lysosomal membrane damage. Lysosomal perforation and other endomembrane damage can be inflicted by various agents such as some chemicals yielding osmotically active products, crystalline silica, possibly amyloid aggregates and cytoplasmic organic or inorganic crystals, as well as intracellular microbial pathogens such as Mycobacterium tuberculosis; such injury can be modeled using membrane-permeant dipeptide precursors that polymerize in lysosomes,. Under resting, homeostatic conditions galectin-8 interacts with mTOR, which in its active state resides on the cytosolic (cytofacial) side of lysosomal membranes. However, under lysosome damaging conditions leading to exposure of the exofacially, i.e., lumenaly, oriented glycans (glycoproteins and glycolipids), galectin-8 recognizes the cytofacial glycans exposed due to membrane damage and releases mTOR. Galectin-8 instead now binds to the mTOR-regulatory complex located on the lysosomal membrane including SLC38A9, LAMTOR1, and RRAGA/RRAGB (RagA/B). This complex loses affinity for mTOR causing mTOR's inactivation and translocation from the lysosome to the cytosol. The damage-responsive complex containing galectin-8, SLC38A9, LAMTOR1, and RRAGA/RRAGB is known as GALTOR. Galectin-3 and galectin-8 also interact with autophagy receptor-regulator TRIM16 that assembles autophagy initiation machinery on damaged lysosomes, whereas galectin-8 also interacts with the autophagy receptor CALCOCO2 (NDP52) recognizing Salmonella-damaged vacuole.

The functional roles of galectins in cellular response to membrane damage are expanding, e.g. Galectin-3 recruits ESCRTs to damaged lysosomes so that lysosomes can be repaired. This occurs before autophagy is induced to repair endosomes and lysosomes lest they are removed by autophagy.

== Galectins and disease ==
Galectins are abundant, distributed widely around the body and have some distinct functions. It is because of these that they are often implicated in a wide range of diseases such as cancer, HIV, autoimmune disease, chronic inflammation, graft vs host disease (GVHD) and allergic reactions. The most studied and characterised mechanisms are for cancer and HIV, which are described below.

=== Cancer ===
The best understood galectin in terms of cancer is galectin-3. Evidence suggests that galectin-3 plays a considerable part in processes linked to tumorigenesis, including transformation to a malignant form, metastasis and increased invasive properties of tumour cells. There is some significant evidence that galectin-3 is involved in cancer since it interacts with oncogenes such as Ras and activates downstream signalling that promotes proliferation. It can also regulate some of the proteins of the cell cycle, such as cyclin E and c-myc, which may give it additional tumorigenic properties. The concentration of galectin-3 is elevated in the circulation of patients with some types of cancer including breast cancer. It has also been identified bound to glycans on the surface of breast cancer cells. In cancer patients whose cancer has metastasised, galectin-3 is higher still, suggesting that this galectin has a crucial role in metastasis. Galectin-3 also binds to MUC-1, a very large transmembrane mucin, which on cancer cells changes expression from long core 2 type O-glycosylation to shorter core 1 type O-glycosylation. Core 2 glycans terminate in galactose or sialic acid, whereas core 1 is branched and has potential for large carbohydrate extensions. High levels of MUC-1 are associated with poor prognosis and increased potential of metastasis. This cancer-associated MUC-1 is a natural ligand for galectin-3. In normal cells, MUC-1 has distinct polarisation and acts as a protective barrier around the cell, reducing cell-cell interactions. In breast cancer cells, it is hypothesised that galectin-3 has high affinity for cancer-associated MUC-1, causing depolarisation and breaking the cell's protective shield. This exposes small adhesion molecules on the surface of the cell, which interact with adhesion proteins on endothelial cell walls, such as E-selectin, promoting intravasation into the blood stream. Experiments shows that overexpression of MUC-1 alone is not enough to increase metastatic potential, and in fact it inhibits tumour cell entry into the blood stream. It requires the presence of upregulated galectin-3 in addition to MUC-1 to increase invasive and metastatic properties of the cancer. This is supported by other studies showing that inhibition of galectin-3 in human breast cancer cells lose their malignancy in vitro. This may provide a clue towards developing therapeutics for cancer, such as galectin-3 inhibitors.

Galectin-8, which increases integrin-mediated adhesion, has been shown to be downregulated in some cancers. This benefits the cancer since integrin interactions with the extracellular matrix prevent metastasis. Lung cancer studies, however, have demonstrated increased adhesion to galectin-8 with increased metastatic potential, which may be mediated by elevated surface expression and activation of integrin α3β1.

=== Intracellular pathogen invasion ===
Galectin-8 has been shown to play a specific role in assessing endosomal integrity. After pathogens, such as bacteria or viruses, are engulfed by cells, they typically try to exit the endosome to gain access to nutrients in the cytosol. Galectin-8 specifically binds to glycosylation found within the endosome, and recruits adapter molecule CALCOCO2 which activates antibacterial autophagy. Galectin-3, galectin 8 and galectin-9 have been shown to play additional roles in autophagy both through control of mTOR (galectin-8) and AMPK (galectin-9), and as a factor (galectin-3) in the assembly of the ULK1-Beclin 1-ATG16L1 initiator complex on TRIM16 during endomembrane damage.

=== HIV ===
Galectin-1 has been shown to enhance HIV infection due to its galactose binding specificity. HIV preferentially infects CD4^{+} T cells and other cells of the immune system, immobilising the adaptive immune system. HIV is a virus that infects CD4^{+} cells via binding of its viral envelope glycoprotein complex, which consists of gp120 and gp41. The gp120 glycoprotein contains two types of N-glycan, high mannose oligomers and N-acetyllactosamine chains on a trimannose core. The high mannose oligomers are pathogen-associated molecular pattern (PAMPs) and are recognised by the C-type lectin DC-SIGN found on dendritic cells. The N-acetyllactosamine chains are ligands for galectin-1. Galectin-1 is expressed in the thymus. In particular it is secreted in abundance by Th1 cells. In its normal function, galectin-1 binds to glycans on the CD4 co-receptor of T cells to prevent auto reactivity. When HIV is present, the galectin bridges between the CD4 co-receptor and gp120 ligands, thus facilitating HIV infection of the T cell. Galectin-1 is not essential for HIV infection but assists it by accelerating the binding kinetics between gp120 and CD4. Knowledge of the mechanism between galectin and HIV may provide important therapeutic opportunities. A galectin-1 inhibitor can be used in conjunction with antiretroviral drugs to decrease the infectivity of the HIV and increase the efficacy of the drug. Galectin-3 binds TRIM5α, a cytosolic restriction factor against HIV acting during HIV capsid uncoating, although the precise role of this association remains to be determined. Several galectins bind other TRIMs some of which are known to contribute to antiviral restriction.

=== Chagas ===
Trypanosoma cruzi infection of cardiac cells, the cause of heart involvement in Chagas disease, is reduced by galectin–1, which may also protect against apoptosis of the infected cardiomyocytes. Benatar et al. (2015) also demonstrated, however, that T. cruzi-infected murine cardiomyocytes reduce the concentration of surface poly-N-acetyllactosamine, a galectin-1 ligand, within their N- and O-linked glycans, possibly creating a "Gal-1 resistant glycophenotype."

== Table of human galectins ==
Human galectin	Location	Function	Implication in disease
Galectin-1	Secreted by immune cells such as by T helper cells in the thymus or by stromal cells surrounding B cells Also found in abundance in muscle, neurons and kidney	Negatively regulate B cell receptor activation Activate apoptosis in T cells Suppression of Th1 and Th17 immune responses Contributes to nuclear splicing of pre-mRNA	Can enhance HIV infection Found upregulated in tumour cells
Galectin-2	Gastrointestinal tract	Binds selectively to β-galactosides of T cells to induce apoptosis	Risk of myocardial infarction
Galectin-3	Wide distribution	Can be pro- or anti-apoptotic (cell dependent) Regulation of some genes including JNK1 Contributes to nuclear splicing of pre-mRNA Crosslinking and adhesive properties In the cytoplasm, helps form the ULK1-Beclin-1-ATG16L1-TRIM16 complex following endomembrane damage	Upregulation occurs in some cancers, including breast cancer, gives increased metastatic potential Implicated in tuberculosis defense
Galectin-4	Intestine and stomach	Binds with high affinity to lipid rafts suggesting a role in protein delivery to cells	Inflammatory bowel disease (IBD)
Galectin-7	Stratified squamous epithelium	Differentiation of keratinocytes May have a role in apoptosis and cellular repair mediated by p53.	Implications in cancer Implications in psoriasis
Galectin-8	Wide distribution	Binds to integrins of the extracellular matrix. In the cytoplasm, alternatively binds to mTOR or forms the GALTOR complex with SLC38A9, LAMTOR1, and RagA/B	Downregulation in some cancers Implicated in tuberculosis defense
Galectin-9	Kidney Thymus Synovial fluid Macrophages	Functions as a urate transporter in the kidney Induces apoptosis of thymocytes and Th1 cells Enhances maturation of dendritic cells to secrete inflammatory cytokines. In the cytoplasm, associates upon lysosomal damage with AMPK and activates it	Rheumatoid arthritis Implicated in tuberculosis defense
Galectin-10	Expressed in eosinophils and basophils	Essential role in immune system by suppression of T cell proliferation	Found in Charcot–Leyden crystals in asthma
Galectin-12	Adipose tissue	Stimulates apoptosis of adipocytes Involved in adipocyte differentiation	None found
Galectin-13	Placenta	Lysophospholipase	Pregnancy complications
