= HGH1 =

Protein-coding gene in the species Homo sapiens

Identifiers
- Aliases: HGH1, BRP16, BRP16L, C8orf30A, C8orf30B, FAM203A, FAM203B, HGH1 homolog
- External IDs: MGI: 1930628; GeneCards: HGH1

Gene location (Human)
Chr.	Chromosome 8 (human)
Band	8q24.3	Start	144,137,774 bp
Band	8q24.3	End	144,140,851 bp

Gene location (Mouse)
Chr.	Chromosome 15 (mouse)
Band	15 D3|15 35.78 cM	Start	76,253,098 bp
Band	15 D3|15 35.78 cM	End	76,255,637 bp
RNA expression pattern
Bgee	Human / Mouse (ortholog); Top expressed in: mucosa of ileum; mucosa of transverse colon; apex of heart; tibialis anterior muscle; right adrenal gland; right adrenal cortex; right lobe of liver; granulocyte; right lobe of thyroid gland; left adrenal gland / Top expressed in: Paneth cell; Rostral migratory stream; internal carotid artery; zygote; external carotid artery; lacrimal gland; primitive streak; condyle; hair follicle; fossa; More reference expression data
BioGPS	n/a
Gene ontology
Molecular function	molecular function
Cellular component	cellular component
Biological process	biological process
Sources:Amigo / QuickGO
Orthologs
Databases	NCBI: entry; OMA: entry
Species	Human	Mouse
Entrez	51236	59053
Ensembl	ENSG00000235173	ENSMUSG00000022554
UniProt	Q9BTY7	Q8C3I8
RefSeq (mRNA)	NM_016458	NM_021555
RefSeq (protein)	NP_057542	NP_067530
Location (UCSC)	Chr 8: 144.14 – 144.14 Mb	Chr 15: 76.25 – 76.26 Mb
PubMed search
- Wikidata
View/Edit Human	View/Edit Mouse

Co-chaperone protein HGH1 homolog is a protein that in humans is encoded by the HGH1 gene (previously FAM203B). While FAM203B is only found in humans and possibly non-human primates, its paralog, FAM203A, is highly conserved. The FAM203B protein contains two conserved domains of unknown function, DUF383 and DUF384, and no transmembrane domains. This protein has no known function yet, although the homolog of FAM203A in Caenorhabditis elegans (Y54H5A.2) is thought to help regulate the actin cytoskeleton.

== Gene ==
FAM203B is located on the positive DNA strand of the long arm of chromosome 8 at locus 24.3 (8q24.3) from 76,368,898 - 76,371,411 in the human genome. The gene product contains 2,402 bp of mRNA with 6 predicted exons in the human gene. There are no known isoforms.

FAM203B mRNA tissue expression levels.

=== Gene Neighborhood ===
The pseudogene TSSK5P2 is located on the negative strand opposite FAM203B (145,440,975 - 145,443,775), while LOC377711 is located immediately downstream on the positive strand (145,448,755 - 145,485,896). FAM203A, MROH1, and SCXB are located upstream of FAM203B.

=== Gene Expression ===
Expression Profile: mRNA expression has been localized in many tissue types (immune, nervous, muscle, internal, secretory, and reproductive) in similar quantities and may therefore be ubiquitous.

Promoter: The predicted promoter region of FAM203B is located between 145,437,380 and 145,438,015 on Chromosome 8 and has a length of 636 bp.

== Protein ==
The function of FAM203B is not currently understood. The FAM203B protein has 390 amino acids, a molecular weight of 42.1 kdal, and an isoelectric point of 4.56.

=== Structure ===
FAM203B contains two domains of unknown function: DUF383 (residues 110–288) and DUF384 (residues 292–349). The protein is alanine-, proline-, and leucine-rich, but poor in serine, asparagine, threonine, isoleucine, lysine, and phenylalanine. The following internal repeats can be found in the primary sequence: LPFL (26-29, 245–248), ELAP (70-73), GRAL (54-57, 111–114), and LAADPGL (88-94, 99–105). There are no positive, negative, mixed charge, or hydrophobic clusters; no transmembrane domains; and no clusters of amino acid multiplets. The secondary structure prediction generated by the Phyre 2.0 bioinformatic server shows only α-helices, almost all of which have high confidence values. The overall confidence value of the model is 99.5%.

=== Post-Translational Modifications ===
There are at least six predicted phosphorylation sites in FAM203B: S17, S153, Y167, T223, S259, and S320. The FAM203B protein is also predicted to locate to the cytoplasm.

=== Protein Interactions ===
There are many possible transcription factor binding sites in the FAM203B promoter. Below is a table of the best possibilities, which have high confidence values, evolutionary conservation, and/or multiple possible binding sites in the promoter.

Table of Possible Transcription Factor Binding Sites in Predicted FAM203B Promoter:

Transcription factor	Start	End	Strand	Sequence
Winged-helix transcription factor IL-2 enhancer binding factor, forkhead box K2	6	22	-	gacaggacAACAcaggg
Hypermethylated in Cancer 1	49	61	+	ccgTGCCagcctg
Zinc finger transcription factor ZBP-89	94	116	+	tggccactCCCCcattcagccct
Kidney-enriched kruppel-like factor, KLF15	142	158	+	gagccGGGGcgcgggcc
Transcription factor II B recognition element	149	155	-	ccgCGCC
Glial cells missing homolog 1, chorion-specific transcription factor GCMα	159	173	+	tcagaCCCTcagggc
Transcription factor AP-2α	161	175	-	gggcCCTGagggtct
Smad4 transcription factor involved in TGFβ signaling	245	255	-	gtaGTCTcggc
Nuclear factor 1	278	298	-	gatTTGGccgcctgccgcgtc
ZF5 POZ domain zinc finger, zinc finger protein 161	295	309	+	aatCGCGccgggcct
Smad3 transcription factor involved in TGFβ signaling	365	375	-	ggcGTCTggcc
Myeloid zinc finger protein MZF1	384	394	-	gcGGGGagtta
X-linked zinc finger protein	397	407	+	gcGGCCtggcc
Myeloid zinc finger protein MZF1	406	416	-	gaGGGGagggg
Core promoter-binding protein with 5 kruppel-type zinc fingers	423	445	+	ccggtcCCGCcccttgagcccag
X gene core promoter element 1	424	434	-	ggGCGGgaccg
Zinc finger and BTB domain-containing 7A	479	501	-	cgcaaCCCCgcccaccagaggag
Kruppel-like factor 7	483	499	+	tctggtgGGCGgggttg
Erythroid kruppel-like factor	533	549	+	ggcaccggtcGGGTggc
Hypermethylated in cancer 1	541	553	-	tgcTGCCacccga

There are several other proteins that may interact directly with the FAM203B protein including C1orf112, HEATR3, MRTO4, BYSL, GINS1, DKC1, TXNDC12, PWP2, IMP4, and NIP7.

== Homology and Evolution ==
=== FAM203A: Paralog ===
FAM203A is 99% identical to FAM203B with only one amino acid difference (E264Q) due to a point mutation (G857C). This indicates that the duplication event that produced FAM203B 242,266 bp downstream from FAM203A occurred very recently in evolutionary history. The FAM203A protein is highly conserved and has orthologs in primates, rodents, ungulates, marsupials, amphibians, fish, fungi, plants, and at least one monotreme, one reptile, and one hemichordate.

=== Orthologs and Homologs ===
Table of FAM203B Paralog and Homologs:

Scientific name	Common name	Divergence from Humans (MYA)	NCBI Protein Accession	Gene Name	Protein Length ! !Sequence similarity	
Homo sapiens	Human	0.0	NP_057542	FAM203A	390	100%
Macaca mulatta	Rhesus macaque	29.2	XM_001090013	BRP16L	396	94%
Pan troglodytes	Chimpanzee	6.3	XP_520011	FAM203A	395	98%
Mus musculus	Mouse	92.3	NP_067530	FAM203A	393	86%
Sus scrofa	Wild boar	94.2	XP_003125495	FAM203A-like	406	85%
Monodelphis domestica	Gray short-tailed opossum	162.6	XP_003340757	FAM203A-like	483	78%
Columba livia	Rock dove	296.0	EMC87403	BRP16 (partial)	194	64%
Danio rerio	Zebrafish	400.1	NP_001002522	FAM203A	377	70%
Xenopus tropicalis	Western clawed frog	371.2	AAI60980	LOC100145412	377	70%
Xenopus tropicalis	Western clawed frog	371.2	NP_001007916	FAM203A	359	68%
Strongylocentrotus purpuratus	Purple sea urchin	742.9	XP_793139	FAM203A-like	372	62%
Anolis carolinensis	Carolina anole	301.7	XP_003228921	BRP16L	286	57%
Saccoglossus kowglevski	Acorn worm	661.2	XP_002739897	BRP16L	362	61%
Danio rerio	Zebrafish	400.1	XP_002665502	BRP16L	181	57%
Saccharomyces cerevisiae	Budding yeast	1369.0	NP_011703	Hgh1p	394	52%
Arabidopsis thaliana	Thale cress	1369.0	NP_172882	Armadillo/beta-catenin-like repeats-containing	339	49%

There is one ortholog of FAM203B, brain protein 16-like (BRP16L) in Macaca mulatta, although no other primates appear to have orthologous proteins. There are two possible explanations for this anomaly: (1) DNA of other primates has not been sequenced thoroughly in the genomic region of the FAM203B ortholog, or (2) FAM203B is the result of a gene duplication event unique to humans, meaning that BRP16L in M. mulatta resulted from an earlier duplication event unique to that species. The second explanation is supported by the following evidence:

1. Like M. mulatta, Danio rerio has both a FAM203A gene and a BRP16L gene. The large amount of time since the divergence of the M. mulatta and D. rerio lineages suggests that these BRP16L genes are the result of separate duplication events.
2. The BRP16L protein in D. rerio has a significant 3’ truncation compared to the M. mulatta protein, further supporting the hypothesis that these proteins evolved separately.
3. If the BRP16L genes in "M mulatta" and "D. rerio" are the result of separate duplication events, then it is also possible that FAM203B and BRP16L in "M. mulatta" are the result of separate duplication events.
4. BRP16 (brain protein 16) is an alias of FAM203A, and BRP16L (brain protein 16-like) is an alias of FAM203B. A gene named BRP16L simply means that the gene is related to FAM203A but not necessarily to FAM203B.
5. FAM203A and FAM203B are located in the telomeric region of chromosome 8, an area of chromosomes that frequently experiences recombination events.

However, because FAM203A and FAM203B are so similar, it is difficult to determine whether proteins are orthologs or just simply homologs.

=== Phylogeny ===
The phylogenetic tree of FAM203B and its homologs matches with the overall divergence of the respective lineages.

=== Conserved Domains, Motifs, and Residues ===
1. ARM (armadillo/beta-catenin-like repeats-containing): Found in two homologs (FAM203A in Danio rerio and At1g14300 in Arabidopsis thaliana) and overlaps slightly with the beginning of the DUF383 domain. Related to the HEAT domain, consists of a 40-amino-acid tandemly repeated sequence motif, and is thought to mediate protein-protein interactions. Several eukaryotic genes contain ARM domains including armadillo in Drosophila melanogaster, beta-catenin, plakoglobin, and adenomatous polyposis coli in mammals.
2. DUF383: Domain of unknown function 383
3. DUF384: Domain of unknown function 383

A schematic representation of the conserved domains in the FAM203B protein.

Every ortholog and homolog of FAM203B has a DUF383 domain and a DUF384 domain (except Anolis carolinensis, which is missing DUF384 due to a large 3' truncation). There is significant variation among mammals, marsupials, and monotremes as to where the DUF383 domain begins, whereas this variation is smaller in reptiles, amphibians, fish, invertebrates, plants, and fungi. Additionally, the DUF383 domain ends at the same location for all homologs, while the DUF384 domain starts and ends at roughly the same location in all homologs. There is high homology in the DUF384 domain (292..349) and in the DUF383 domain (154..288), and several amino acids are completely conserved in vertebrates, invertebrates, plants, and fungi, which include Arg190, Gly219, Asn226, Lys273, and Lys338. Other highly conserved amino acids include Asn87, Lys88, Arg216, and Phe229.
