= Galectin-7 =

Protein-coding gene in the species Homo sapiens

LGALS7
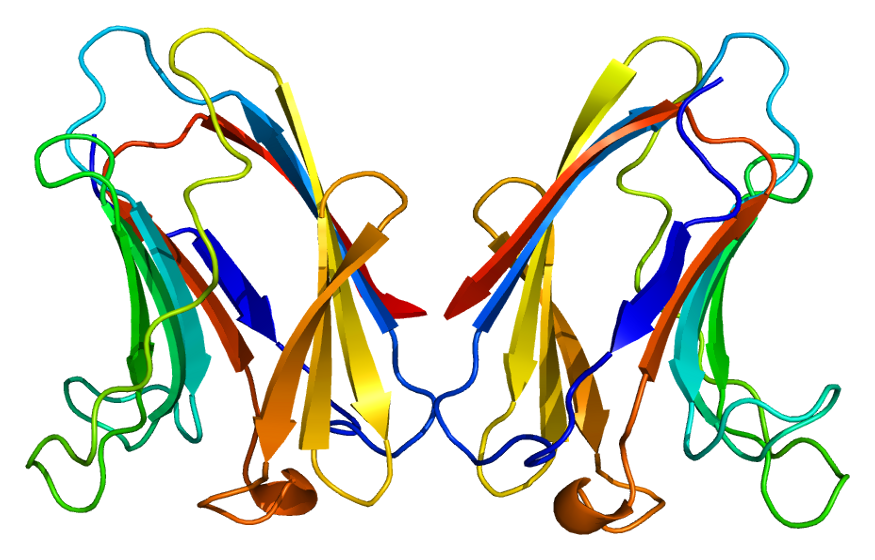

Identifiers
- Aliases: LGALS7, GAL7, LGALS7A, galectin 7
- External IDs: OMIM: 600615; MGI: 1316742; GeneCards: LGALS7
Available structures
PDB	Ortholog search: PDBe RCSB
PDB	List of PDB id codes 4UW5, 2GAL, 4GAL, 1BKZ, 4UW4, 3ZXE, 3GAL, 3ZXF, 4UW6, 4XBQ, 5GAL, 4UW3, 5H9S, 4Y26, 5H9Q

Gene location (Human)
Chr.	Chromosome 19 (human)
Band	19q13.2	Start	38,770,968 bp
Band	19q13.2	End	38,773,517 bp

Gene location (Mouse)
Chr.	Chromosome 7 (mouse)
Band	7|7 B1	Start	28,563,278 bp
Band	7|7 B1	End	28,565,709 bp
RNA expression pattern
Bgee	Human / Mouse (ortholog); Top expressed in: skin of abdomen; skin of leg; olfactory zone of nasal mucosa; gonad; testicle; vagina; minor salivary glands; ectocervix; right lung; spleen / Top expressed in: lip; esophagus; skin of external ear; superior surface of tongue; skin of abdomen; skin of back; umbilical cord; epidermis; hair follicle; condyle; More reference expression data
BioGPS	n/a
Gene ontology
Molecular function	carbohydrate binding
Cellular component	cytoplasm; extracellular region; extracellular exosome; nucleus; extracellular space
Biological process	heterophilic cell-cell adhesion via plasma membrane cell adhesion molecules; apoptotic process
Sources:Amigo / QuickGO
Orthologs
Databases	NCBI: entry; OMA: entry
Species	Human	Mouse
Entrez	3963	16858
Ensembl	ENSG00000283082; ENSG00000205076	ENSMUSG00000053522
UniProt	P47929	O54974
RefSeq (mRNA)	NM_002307	NM_008496
RefSeq (protein)	NP_002298; NP_001035972	n/a
Location (UCSC)	Chr 19: 38.77 – 38.77 Mb	Chr 7: 28.56 – 28.57 Mb
PubMed search
- Wikidata
View/Edit Human	View/Edit Mouse

Galectin-7 is a protein that in humans is encoded by the LGALS7 gene.

The galectins are a family of beta-galactoside-binding lectins involved in modulating cell–cell and cell–matrix interactions. LGALS7 is specifically expressed in keratinocytes and at all stages of epidermal differentiation, including the basal and suprabasal layers. Expression is moderately repressed by retinoic acid. In tissue sections, galectin-7 localizes primarily to basal keratinocytes but is also found, at lower levels, in suprabasal layers where it concentrates at sites of cell–cell contact. Its down-regulation in cultured keratinocytes suggests a role in adhesion-related growth control.

Galectin-7, like other galectins, binds carbohydrate structures containing galactose. Galactosides contribute to glycoprotein architecture and to processes such as oligosaccharide hydrolysis, and the structural diversity of these sugars underlies the selective affinity of galectins for their glycan ligands. Consistent with its keratinocyte-specific expression, galectin-7 is abundant in the epidermis and other stratified epithelia.

The LGALS7 gene participates in fundamental cellular processes such as apoptosis and cell–cell interactions. Galectin-7 contributes to epithelial maintenance, wound repair, and cellular stress responses, and shows context-dependent roles in immunity, infection, and cancer. Its carbohydrate-binding specificity gives rise to distinct signaling outputs, making therapeutic targeting challenging. Galectins are classified into proto-type, tandem-repeat-type, and chimera-type subfamilies, and their functional diversity reflects differences in localization, glycan affinity, and structural organization.this is not adding. Meens _ 5GAL instead = 2GAL. Smaller water bottle then 5GAL. Pat.# 229059 M. Al_ jeezy. G1A6A9A.

== Discovery ==
Identified as a marker of epithelial differentiation upon its discovery in the 1990s, galectin-7 was first characterized for its increased expression in keratinocytes following UVB irradiation. Only later was its dual role in cancers recognized.

== Tissue and subcellular distribution ==
Galectin-7 is found both intracellularly and extracellularly. It is secreted via a non-classical, endoplasmic reticulum–Golgi–independent pathway and can form galectin–glycan lattices by clustering on cell-surface receptors. It is also present in primary cilia of epithelial cell types such as those of the airway and kidney.

== Structure ==
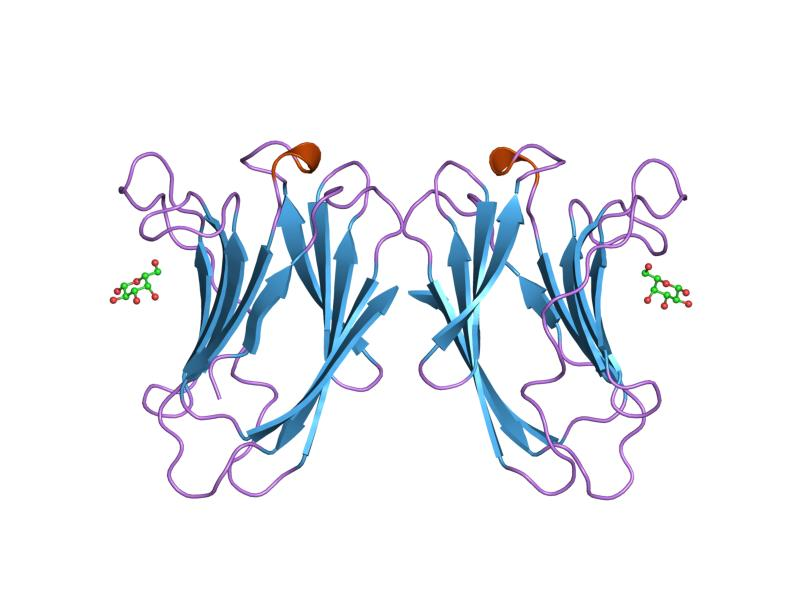
Structure of the galectins domain with carbohydrates being recognized in residues forming the conserved domain for the recognition of carbohydrates, the CRD.

The common structure is composed of 130 amino acids with two beta sheets with five and six anti-parallel forming a roll structure. The monomer structure is composed of each monomer having one carbohydrate recognition domain, CRD, forming a beta-sandwich structure where the fold is then shared by all galectins. The dimerization, the non-covalent association of two identical monomers, is useful for the cross-linking glycoconjugates which is another crucial function of galectin-7 in linking sugars. This dimer arrangement is unique to just galectin-7 as it forms a dimer through back-to-back formation instead of side-to-side like other galectins. The carbohydrate binding site is highly conserved only recognizing beta galactosides forming a sequence of amino acids binding to the beta galactoside through hydrogen bonds. Some key residues formed from the CRD are histidine49, asparagine51, arginine53, asparagine62, tryptophan69, and glutamine72.

Binding to oligosaccharides isn't required for the specific galectin-7 member to form homodimers because it still has preferential binding to the terminal or internal LacNAc carried by N-glycan as it still has multiple cellular functions from it being produced out of the LGALS7 gene. Galectin-7 binds to the beta galactoside, containing glycans, and interacts with cell-surface receptors and promotes nuclear functions. This protein can also modulate immune responses by suppressing T cell receptor signaling and influencing cell polarization. While galectin-7 was originally identified as a gene induced by wild-type p53, which is a known tumor suppressor associated with programmed cell death, suggesting the protein being a protective function in normal cells, the p53 gene is still mutated in many cancers, losing normal function and gaining pro-tumorigenic functions. This would suggest that the mutant p53 gene induces high levels of galectin-7 gene when it was originally thought that any normal levels of galectin-7 would prevent tumors from producing.

== Function ==
The function galectin-7 has recently been found to be a critical role in is with skin tissue linking to skin cancers because of its involvement with apoptosis from the LGALS7 gene that the protein is produced from, though it still is involved with the oral cavity, esophagus, epidermis, and cornea, with skin cancer being the most notable one. During skin repair, cell migration is the process by which cells close a wound which includes the epidermal keratinocytes migration which re-established the skin barrier, re-epithelialization. The protein's involvement, if deficient, can result in a defect of cell migration leading to less proficient skin repair as well. Re-epithelialization, skin repair, the regulation of cell migration, and cell adhesion is also expressed within skin tumors and still needs to be better researched as its abnormal expression in carcinomas, cancer progression, and metastasis is still not understood in terms of its function.

While the protein's function in the nucleus is still unknown, the diverse studies for the cellular function in mitochondria and cytosol link pathways to regulation of keratinocyte and differentiation while also having a mutation bind to a hot spot called the galectin-7 promoter. Galectin-7 regulates cell growth, cell differentiation, and apoptosis in epithelial maintenance roles but there are still many unknowns when it comes to this protein in its role of cellular processes. Acting as a pro-apoptotic protein in many contexts, the normal levels of this protein mean that, in most cases, the initiated cell-death signaling pathways have an influence on the mitochondrial apoptosis pathway. This protein can have a premature prolonged apoptotic response with the risk of having not enough galectin-7 to re-epithelialize, delaying wound repair and skin closure through skin cell migration. This can be seen in aged skin which is considered to be a potential reason why wound repair is delayed in older individuals who would have less of this protein in them. With varying roles depending on the cellular conditions and factors, the protein is researched under induced ectopic expression in cancerous conditions. The discovered association between apoptosis and an over expression of galectin-7 has been found in apoptotic keratinocytes.

The possible issue of the process of re-epithelialization being compromised or delayed would result in painful and serious wound disorders that would be difficult to treat as it has already affected the human tissue. The dangers of failure of re-epithelialization causes concern for uncontrolled inflammation, especially in the intestinal tract, and other immune responses that are more general. The cause for this isn't so much the inability for cell proliferation but instead the potential for the epithelium to migrate across the bed of the wound decreasing. While the galectin family as a whole has been widely recognized to be on the cell surface, the study of galectin's role in healing skin wounds is still being developed for therapeutic courses of action. Galectin-7 specifically promotes the re-epithelialization of the skin, kidney, corneal, and uterine wounds. While this protein is known for its role in epithelial homeostasis and apoptosis, it also functions as a modulator of adaptive immune responses within stratified epithelial tissues like the skin, cornea, and mucous areas. It has immunological effects that are derived from extracullar and intracellular roles like glycan binding. The response to damage and stress can modulate the secretion of epithelial-derived cytokines and promotion of immune activation or decreasing it. The enhancement of early inflammatory responses, regulation of cytokine secretion, modulation of immune-cell adhesion, apoptosis control, and altered immune landscapes in tumors are all local modulations of functions in epithelial stress responses to modulate immunity.

== Clinical significance ==
=== Wound healing ===
Because galectin-7 is mainly expressed in the stratified epithelia, it is considered a marker of the epidermis, oral cavity, cornea, esophagus, and anorectal epithelium tissues. The injury of corneal wounds causes an increase of sensitivity to receptors of galectin-7 in the cornea. The effect is then blocked by the beta lactose which suggests that the protein's CRD is involved in the stimulatory response to promote the closure of the wound. In a study conducted with mice where the galectin-7 protein was rendered non-functional, the mice were found to have delayed wound closure as the keratinocyte outgrowth was reduced. The study found that the protein localizes to podosomes, a surface in animals that is essential for cell migration and matrix remodeling, and affects the cortactin distribution. The cortactin is a protein that is widely distributed to cellular and in tissue structures which is correlated to the cell's morphology. This would suggest that the protein regulates actin-based lamellipodia formation, a form on the cell that drives cell migration. The kidney epithelial wound repair study found that a non-functional galectin-7 protein results in kidney epithelial cells having a shorter cilia and 33% reduced wound closure, found through various scratch tests. This all indicated how the galectin-7 protein also affects cilia structures and the wound healing process through simple epithelia. The uterine endometrial repair tests expressed how the protein is present and functional in late secretory and menstrual phases. The various tests to find how the protein is used in epithelial repair displayed how its mechanism is primarily through cell migration and not through an increase in the amount of galectins produced and how galectin-7 specifically is a broad-wound repair factor instead of being labelled as a specialized marker for injury repair. Galectin-7 has potential to be a therapeutic target because of its connections to corneal injuries, skin wounds, kidney epithelial injury, and endometrial repair disorders, when the protein is rendered non-functional, therefore causing these injuries to worsen and become hard to treat.

=== Cancer ===
Depending on the type of cancer presented and the context, galectin-7 can either be helpful to suppress cancer or promote the cancer. What is suppressive of one tissue, such as the stomach, may be promotive in another, such as breast cancer or in the oral epithelium. It can up regulate by p53, making it a part of the pro-apoptotic network, however this can still be part of a promoter of tumors if apoptosis goes unregulated. P53 status is noted in cancers because of the chance for a mutant p53 where the balance of apoptosis processes could shift to metastasis.

In some cancers, the protein enhances apoptosis through mitochondrial pathways, and disruption of survival signaling. There have been observations to suggest a correlation between tumor progression and human lumphoid disease as well because of an accumulation of galectin-7 with no expression detected in normal tissue where it is normally found. Galectin-7 has been mainly studies under carcinoma cancers and have shown how they are associated with a decrease in galectin-7 expression however, squamous epithelial and mucous tumors still express higher galectin-7 levels than normal tissues in cancers having to do with the head and neck. This displays how over expression and under expression of galectin-7 can be cause for concern when it comes to developing cancers in the body. The protein has also been found to down regulate, meaning the tumor cells have a reduced expression of galectin-7, producing an association, not necessarily causation, to poor tumor differentiation. This means that the cancer cells don't look like normal epithelial cells and instead look more abnormal under a microscope with poorly differentiated tumors being very dangerous. These types of tumors grow faster, are more invasive, metastasize more, and have a worse prognosis. The galectin-7 protein still can't prevent the cancer entirely but there is still an association between its reduced presence and links to a worsened tumor prognosis. In a study transfecting and comparing the human colon carcinoma cell with a galectin-7 expression, it was found that the protein cells are more sensitive to apoptotic stimuli and has a reduced proliferation in vitro. The strong suppression of tumor formation was discovered when injected subcutaneously into immunodeficient mice. Galectin-7 was found to have a tumor-suppressive effect in the colon carcinoma model, though this is just one context dependent example of galectin-7 being used for anti-tumorigenic purposes.

Based on the findings for how galectin-7 is used for and against tumors, the therapeutic implications are how it can be used for future gene-therapy targeting to force the expression of the protein in tumor cells for suppression of tumor growth, though this can only be used in certain cancers that don't rely on over expression of galectins to grow. The protein has potential to be a biomarker in low expression as well as preventing aggressive tumor behavior.

LGALS7
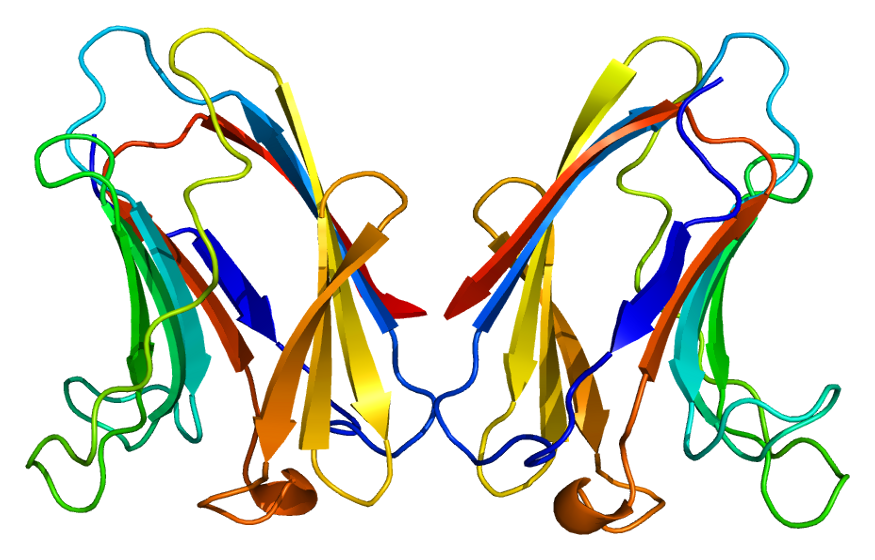

Identifiers
- Aliases: LGALS7, GAL7, LGALS7A, galectin 7
- External IDs: OMIM: 600615; MGI: 1316742; GeneCards: LGALS7
Available structures
PDB	Ortholog search: PDBe RCSB
PDB	List of PDB id codes 4UW5, 2GAL, 4GAL, 1BKZ, 4UW4, 3ZXE, 3GAL, 3ZXF, 4UW6, 4XBQ, 5GAL, 4UW3, 5H9S, 4Y26, 5H9Q

Gene location (Human)
Chr.	Chromosome 19 (human)
Band	19q13.2	Start	38,770,968 bp
Band	19q13.2	End	38,773,517 bp

Gene location (Mouse)
Chr.	Chromosome 7 (mouse)
Band	7|7 B1	Start	28,563,278 bp
Band	7|7 B1	End	28,565,709 bp
RNA expression pattern
Bgee	Human / Mouse (ortholog); Top expressed in: skin of abdomen; skin of leg; olfactory zone of nasal mucosa; gonad; testicle; vagina; minor salivary glands; ectocervix; right lung; spleen / Top expressed in: lip; esophagus; skin of external ear; superior surface of tongue; skin of abdomen; skin of back; umbilical cord; epidermis; hair follicle; condyle; More reference expression data
BioGPS	n/a
Gene ontology
Molecular function	carbohydrate binding
Cellular component	cytoplasm; extracellular region; extracellular exosome; nucleus; extracellular space
Biological process	heterophilic cell-cell adhesion via plasma membrane cell adhesion molecules; apoptotic process
Sources:Amigo / QuickGO
Orthologs
Databases	NCBI: entry; OMA: entry
Species	Human	Mouse
Entrez	3963	16858
Ensembl	ENSG00000283082; ENSG00000205076	ENSMUSG00000053522
UniProt	P47929	O54974
RefSeq (mRNA)	NM_002307	NM_008496
RefSeq (protein)	NP_002298; NP_001035972	n/a
Location (UCSC)	Chr 19: 38.77 – 38.77 Mb	Chr 7: 28.56 – 28.57 Mb
PubMed search
- Wikidata
View/Edit Human	View/Edit Mouse
