= Galectin-4 =

Protein-coding gene in the species Homo sapiens

LGALS4
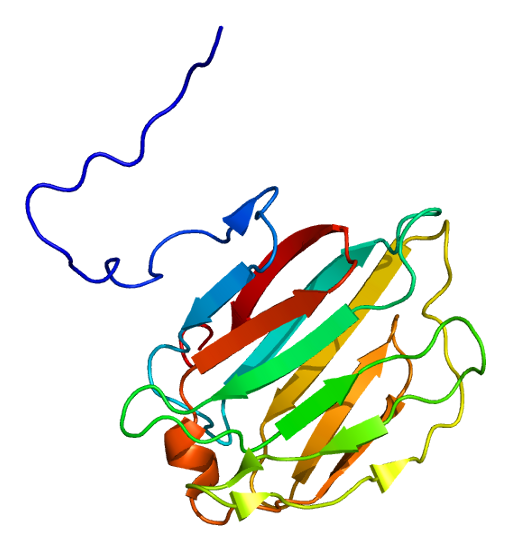

Identifiers
- Aliases: LGALS4, GAL4, L36LBP, galectin 4
- External IDs: OMIM: 602518; MGI: 107536; GeneCards: LGALS4
Available structures
PDB	Ortholog search: PDBe RCSB
PDB	List of PDB id codes 1X50, 4YLZ, 4YM0, 4YM1, 4YM2, 4YM3, 5CBL, 5DUW, 4XZP, 5DUX, 5DUU, 5DUV

Gene location (Human)
Chr.	Chromosome 19 (human)
Band	19q13.2	Start	38,801,671 bp
Band	19q13.2	End	38,812,945 bp

Gene location (Mouse)
Chr.	Chromosome 7 (mouse)
Band	7 B1|7 16.94 cM	Start	28,533,279 bp
Band	7 B1|7 16.94 cM	End	28,541,133 bp
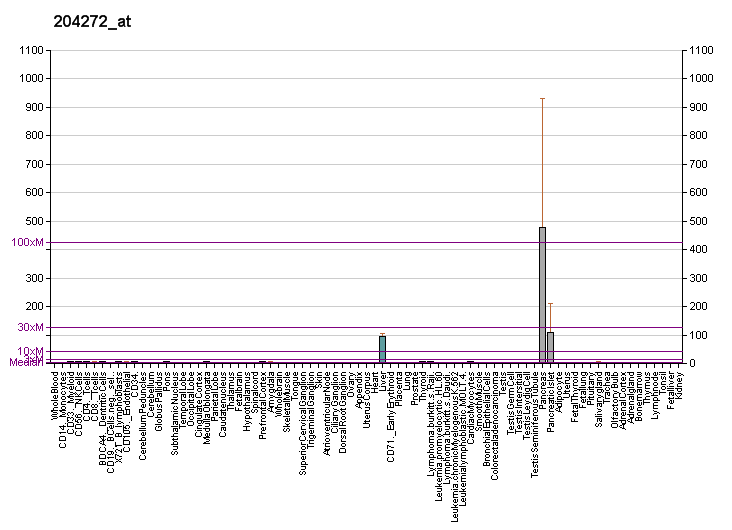
RNA expression pattern
Bgee	Human / Mouse (ortholog); Top expressed in: mucosa of transverse colon; rectum; duodenum; gallbladder; appendix; islet of Langerhans; right lobe of liver; body of pancreas; gastric mucosa; body of stomach / Top expressed in: left colon; ileum; epithelium of small intestine; crypt of lieberkuhn of small intestine; migratory enteric neural crest cell; duodenum; intestinal villus; Ileal epithelium; mucous cell of stomach; pyloric antrum; More reference expression data
BioGPS	More reference expression data
Gene ontology
Molecular function	galactoside binding; carbohydrate binding
Cellular component	cytosol; plasma membrane; extracellular space; collagen-containing extracellular matrix
Biological process	cell adhesion
Sources:Amigo / QuickGO
Orthologs
Databases	NCBI: entry; OMA: entry
Species	Human	Mouse
Entrez	3960	16855
Ensembl	ENSG00000171747; ENSG00000282992	ENSMUSG00000053964
UniProt	P56470	Q8K419
RefSeq (mRNA)	NM_006149	NM_010706
RefSeq (protein)	NP_006140	NP_034836
Location (UCSC)	Chr 19: 38.8 – 38.81 Mb	Chr 7: 28.53 – 28.54 Mb
PubMed search
- Wikidata
View/Edit Human	View/Edit Mouse

Galectin-4 is a protein that in humans is encoded by the LGALS4 gene.

The galectins are a family of beta-galactoside-binding proteins implicated in modulating cell-cell and cell-matrix interactions. LGALS4 is an S-type lectin that is strongly underexpressed in colorectal cancer. The 323-amino acid LGALS4 protein contains two homologous, approximately 150-amino acid carbohydrate recognition domains and all amino acids typically conserved in galectins.

== Nomenclature ==
Recommended name:Galectin-4, Short name: Gal-4 Alternative name(s):

- Antigen NY-CO-27
- L-36 lactose-binding protein, Short name: L36L
- Lactose-binding lectin 4

== Tissue distribution ==
Gal-4 is highly expressed in the stomach and intestine.

== Structure ==
Gal 4 belongs to the family of galectin. Among various structure of galectins like dimeric, tandem or chimera, Gal-4 is tandem in its structure, so they contains at least two distinct carbohydrate recognising domains (CRD) within one polypeptide, thus are said to be intrinsically divalent. The CRDs are linked with a small peptide domain.

== Function ==
Gal-4 has binding ability with high affinity to lipid rafts suggesting a role in protein delivery to cells

Plus they can perform the following Physiological functions:

Gal-4 enhances the stabilization of lipid raft

Gal-4 participates in apical trafficking

Gal-4 has bactericidal activity against bacteria expressing blood group antigen

Gal-4 promotes intestinal wound healing

Gal-4 promotes growth of axon and myelination in neuron

== Clinical significance ==
=== Cancer ===
Gal-4 which has been detected in many cancer has involved in association with the development and sequence of pancreatic carcinoma, hepatocellular carcinoma, Colorectal cancer (CRC), breast carcinoma, gastric cancer, and lung cancer (Rechreche et al., 1997; Hippo et al., 2001; Hayashi et al., 2013; Belo et al., 2013; Cai et al., 2014). After all, it plays contradictory roles in different type of cancer cell. In addition to that, it has been found in serum of some cancer patients (Kim et al., 2013; Cai et al., 2014; Barrow et al., 2011; Barrow et al., 2013). Till now, in spite of a number of published data regarding galectin-4 expression in cancer, the available information has remained very much limited. Among these cancers, only the role of galectin-4 in CRC development has been revealed explicitly.

The utility of CEA (Carcinoembryonic antigen) and CA19-9 as colorectal carcinoma (CRC) markers is limited and development of additional reliable markers is under investigation. Circulating levels of galectin-1/-3/-4 in CRC patients were importantly higher compared to those in controls. Gal-1 and gal-4 levels significantly decreased after having surgery (P<0.01), and the level of gal-4 in most patients fell below the cut-off value. The levels of circulating gal-4 significantly increased as the tumor stage progressed (P<0.001), whereas those for galectin-1 were relatively high from an early stage. Combined use of gal-4 with CEA and/or CA19-9 distinctly increased the proportion of CRC patients who were positive for tumor markers (from 33.3 to 59.0% for CEA and from 17.1 to 51.4% for CA19-9). Our data show that galectin-4 may be a tumor marker for use in patient follow-up, while galectin-1 could be used for tumor screening. In particular, galectin-4 can be useful as a complementary marker when combined with CEA/CA19-9 to improve CRC follow-up

=== Intestinal inflammation ===
Gal-4 was demonstrated to worsen the condition of intestinal inflammation by directly inducing the CD4+ T cells (cluster of differentiation 4) to produce IL-6(Interleukin) on TCR(T-cell receptor) mutational colitis model (Hokama et al., 2004). IL-6, a well-known inflammatory cytokine, could exacerbate intestinal inflammation in the presence of impaired mucosal barrier or injury to the mucosa. Furthermore, IL-6 was also confirmed to enhance the expression of B-cell lymphoma-2(Bcl-2) and B-cell lymphoma-extra large (Bcl-xl) through activating the STAT3(Signal transducer and activator of transcription) signal pathway, thus inhibiting the apoptosis of CD4+ T cells, and leading to sustainable development of IBD (Atreya et al., 2000; Allocca et al., 2013; Waldner and Neurath, 2014). Gal-4 may directly interact with the CD4+ T cells through binding to the immunological synapse, which is a specific activator of the protein kinase C(PKC) θ-associated signaling cascade in lipid raft (Hokama et al., 2004; Nagahama et al., 2008). Through activating the PKC -associated pathway, galectin-4 stimulates the production of IL-6, therefore exacerbates intestinal inflammation. Anyway, it is not sure which receptor on intestinal CD4+ T cells particularly crosslinks with gal-4. It was found that an inducible colitis-associated glycome (CAG), which contains an immature (nonsialylated) core-1 O-glycan expressed by CD4+ T cells, was identified as a ligand of gal-4 under intestinal inflammatory conditions (Nishida et al., 2012). Thus, gal-4 may activate the PKCθ by binding to CAG and, then contributing to aggravation of colitis. In consistent with this, gal-4, which shows a high affinity to immature O-glycan (Ideo et al., 2002; Blixt et al., 2004), has been shown to exacerbate an experimental chronic colitis (Hokama et al., 2004). Nevertheless, Paclik D et al. demonstrated that gal-4 could induce T cell apoptosis by binding to the CD3 epitope at T cells surface on wild-type colitis model. Once binding to this epitope, gal-4 promotes apoptosis of T cells in calpain-dependent manner and reduces the secretion of cytokines including IL-6, IL-8, IL-10, and IL-17, and then improving the inflammation (Paclik et al., 2008a). Another research found that the role of gal-4 varied in different experimental colitis models (Mathieu et al., 2008). Based on the existing data, we can conclude that gal-4 may exacerbate intestinal inflammation in TCR mutational colitis model, while ameliorate intestinal inflammation in wild-type colitis model
