= Galectin-9 =

Protein-coding gene in the species Homo sapiens

LGALS9
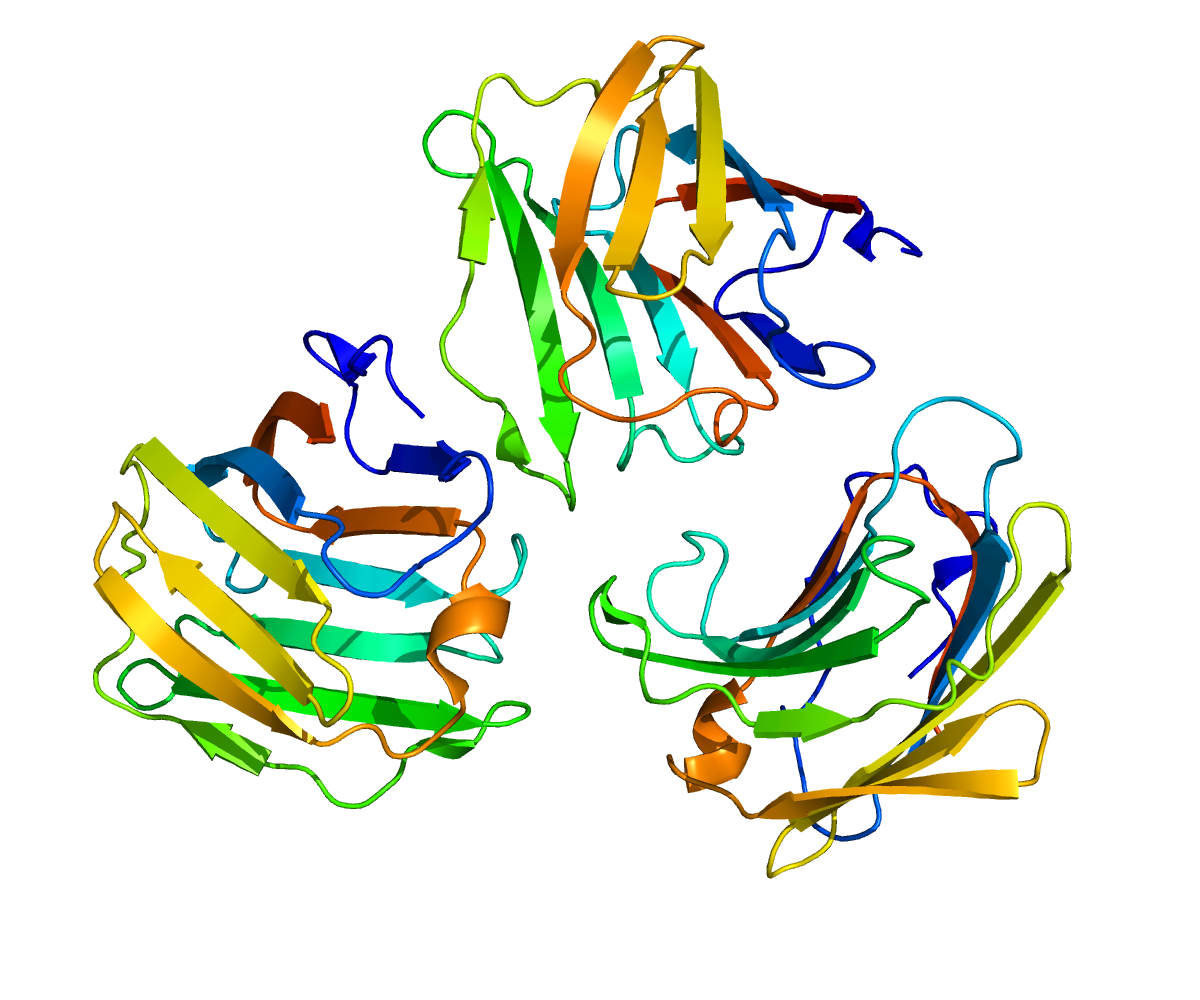

Identifiers
- Aliases: LGALS9, HUAT, LGALS9A, galectin 9
- External IDs: OMIM: 601879; MGI: 109496; GeneCards: LGALS9
Available structures
| PDB | Ortholog search: PDBe RCSB |
| PDB | List of PDB id codes 2EAK, 2EAL, 2YY1, 2ZHK, 2ZHL, 2ZHM, 2ZHN, 3LSD, 3LSE, 3NV1, 3NV2, 3NV3, 3NV4, 3WLU, 3WV6 |

Gene location (Human)
| Chr. | Chromosome 17 (human) |
| Band | 17q11.2 | Start | 27,629,798 bp |
| Band | 17q11.2 | End | 27,649,560 bp |

Gene location (Mouse)
| Chr. | Chromosome 11 (mouse) |
| Band | 11|11 B5 | Start | 78,853,800 bp |
| Band | 11|11 B5 | End | 78,875,772 bp |
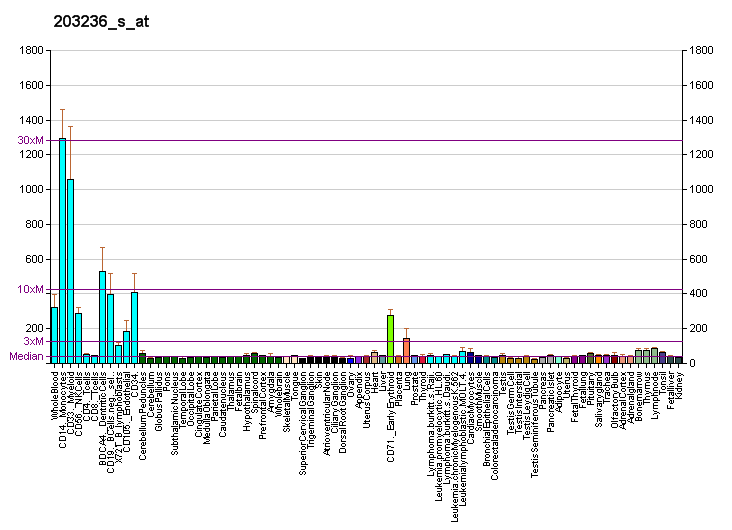
RNA expression pattern
| Bgee | Human / Mouse (ortholog); Top expressed in: monocyte; granulocyte; mucosa of transverse colon; rectum; gallbladder; spleen; epithelium of colon; lymph node; pylorus; appendix / Top expressed in: gastric mucosa; mucous cell of stomach; epithelium of stomach; pyloric antrum; seminal vesicula; left lobe of liver; duodenum; crypt of lieberkuhn of small intestine; thymus; granulocyte; More reference expression data |
| BioGPS | More reference expression data |
Gene ontology
| Molecular function | galactose binding; signal transducer activity; enzyme binding; disaccharide binding; carbohydrate binding |
| Cellular component | intracellular anatomical structure; extracellular region; extracellular exosome; cytoplasm; nucleus; extracellular space; cytosol |
| Biological process | negative regulation of interferon-gamma production; response to interleukin-1; toll-like receptor 4 signaling pathway; maternal process involved in female pregnancy; positive regulation of T cell activation via T cell receptor contact with antigen bound to MHC molecule on antigen presenting cell; immune system process; positive regulation of CD4-positive, alpha-beta T cell proliferation; ERK1 and ERK2 cascade; female pregnancy; positive regulation of viral entry into host cell; positive regulation of monocyte chemotactic protein-1 production; natural killer cell tolerance induction; negative regulation of chemokine production; regulation of interleukin-5 production; toll-like receptor 2 signaling pathway; positive regulation of cysteine-type endopeptidase activity involved in apoptotic signaling pathway; negative regulation of mast cell degranulation; negative regulation of gene expression; positive regulation of interleukin-4 production; chemotaxis; negative regulation of activated T cell proliferation; regulation of interleukin-4 production; response to lipopolysaccharide; positive regulation of gene expression; positive regulation of NF-kappaB transcription factor activity; positive regulation of dendritic cell apoptotic process; positive regulation of ERK1 and ERK2 cascade; cellular response to interferon-gamma; positive regulation of I-kappaB kinase/NF-kappaB signaling; p38MAPK cascade; negative regulation of natural killer cell mediated cytotoxicity; positive regulation of transforming growth factor beta production; negative regulation of CD4-positive, alpha-beta T cell proliferation; positive regulation of dendritic cell differentiation; negative regulation of tumor necrosis factor production; positive regulation of CD4-positive, CD25-positive, alpha-beta regulatory T cell differentiation involved in immune response; inflammatory response; regulation of p38MAPK cascade; mature conventional dendritic cell differentiation; positive regulation of dendritic cell chemotaxis; positive regulation of activated T cell autonomous cell death |
Sources:Amigo / QuickGO
Orthologs
| Databases | NCBI: entry; OMA: entry |
| Species | Human | Mouse |
| Entrez | 3965 | 16859 |
| Ensembl | ENSG00000168961 | ENSMUSG00000001123 |
| UniProt | O00182 | O08573 |
| RefSeq (mRNA) | NM_002308; NM_009587; NM_001330163 | NM_001159301; NM_010708 |
| RefSeq (protein) | NP_001317092; NP_002299; NP_033665 | NP_001152773; NP_034838 |
| Location (UCSC) | Chr 17: 27.63 – 27.65 Mb | Chr 11: 78.85 – 78.88 Mb |
| PubMed search |
- Wikidata
| View/Edit Human | View/Edit Mouse |

Galectin-9 was first isolated from mouse embryonic kidney in 1997 as a 36 kDa beta-galactoside lectin protein. Human galectin-9 is encoded by the LGALS9 gene.

== Structure ==
The protein has N- and C- terminal carbohydrate-binding domains connected by a link peptide. Multiple alternatively spliced transcript variants have been found for this gene.

== Function ==
Galectin-9 has important cytoplasmic, intracellular functions and controls AMPK in response to lysosomal damage that can occur upon exposure to endogenous and exogenous membrane damaging agents such as crystalline silica, cholesterol crystals, microbial toxins, proteopathic aggregates such as tau fibrils and amyloids, and signaling pathways inducing lysosomal permeabilization such as those initiated by TRAIL. Mild lysosomal damage, such as that caused by the anti-diabetes drug metformin may contribute to the therapeutic action of metformin by activating AMPK. The mechanism of how Galectin-9 activates AMPK involves recognition of exposed lysosomal lumenal glycoproteins such as LAMP1, LAMP2, SCRAB2, TMEM192, etc., repulsion of deubiquitinating enzyme USP9X, increased K63 ubiquitination of TAK1 (MAP3K7) kinase, which in turn phopshorylates AMPK and activates it. This signaling cascade directly links Galectin-9 intracellular function with ubiquitin systems. Galectin-9, through its regulation of AMPK, a kinase that negatively regulates mTOR, cooperates with Galectin-8-based effects to inactivate mTOR downstream of the lysosomal damaging agents and conditions.

Galectin-9 is one of the most studied ligands for HAVCR2 (TIM-3) and is expressed on various tumor cells. However, it can also interact with other proteins (CLEC7A, CD137, CD40). For example, an interaction with CD40 on T-cells inhibits their proliferation and induces cell death.

== Clinical significance ==
The expression of galectin-9 has been detected on various hematological malignancies, such as CLL, MDS, Hodgkin's lymphomas, AML or solid tumors, such as lung cancer, breast cancer, and hepatocellular carcinoma.

HAVCR2/ galectin-9 interaction attenuated T-cell expansion and effectors function in tumor microenvironment and chronic infections. Moreover, galectin-9 contributed to tumorigenesis by tumor cell transformation, cell-cycle regulation, angiogenesis, and cell adhesion. The correlative studies analyzing the expression of galectin-9 and malignant clinical features showed controversial results. This can be explained as that galectin-9 can promote tumor immune escape as well as inhibit metastasis by promoting endothelial adhesion. Therefore many factors such as tumor type, stage, and the involvement of different galectins should be taken into consideration when correlating the expression level and the malignancy.

Galectin-9, through its cytoplasmic action in control of AMPK, may affect various health conditions impacted by AMPK, including metabolism, obesity, diabetes, cancer, immune responses, and may be a part of the mechanism of action of the widely-prescribed anti-diabetes drug metformin.
