= NOL8 =

Protein-coding gene in the species Homo sapiens

Identifiers
- Aliases: NOL8, C9orf34, NOP132, bA62C3.3, bA62C3.4, nucleolar protein 8
- External IDs: OMIM: 611534; MGI: 1918180; GeneCards: NOL8

Gene location (Human)
Chr.	Chromosome 9 (human)
Band	9q22.31	Start	92,297,358 bp
Band	9q22.31	End	92,325,636 bp

Gene location (Mouse)
Chr.	Chromosome 13 (mouse)
Band	13 A5|13 25.36 cM	Start	49,806,554 bp
Band	13 A5|13 25.36 cM	End	49,832,492 bp
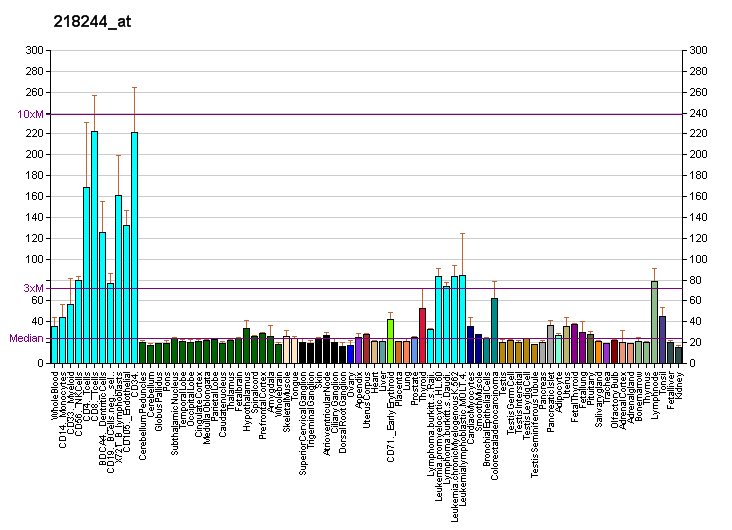
RNA expression pattern
Bgee	Human / Mouse (ortholog); Top expressed in: Achilles tendon; testicle; body of pancreas; body of uterus; skin of abdomen; canal of the cervix; left ovary; tibial nerve; right ovary; spleen / Top expressed in: zygote; spermatocyte; tail of embryo; genital tubercle; secondary oocyte; spermatid; seminiferous tubule; primary oocyte; Rostral migratory stream; hand; More reference expression data
BioGPS	More reference expression data
Gene ontology
Molecular function	protein binding; nucleic acid binding; RNA binding
Cellular component	nucleolus; nucleus; ribonucleoprotein complex
Biological process	rRNA processing; protein localization to nucleolus
Sources:Amigo / QuickGO
Orthologs
Databases	NCBI: entry; OMA: entry
Species	Human	Mouse
Entrez	55035	70930
Ensembl	ENSG00000198000	ENSMUSG00000021392
UniProt	Q76FK4	Q3UHX0
RefSeq (mRNA)	NM_001256394; NM_017948; NM_001330722	NM_001081350; NM_001271397
RefSeq (protein)	NP_001243323; NP_001317651; NP_060418; NP_001243323.1	NP_001258326
Location (UCSC)	Chr 9: 92.3 – 92.33 Mb	Chr 13: 49.81 – 49.83 Mb
PubMed search
- Wikidata
View/Edit Human	View/Edit Mouse

Nucleolar protein 8 is a protein that in humans is encoded by the NOL8 gene.

== Interactions ==
NOL8 has been shown to interact with RRAGA and NIP7.
