= RRAGC =

Protein found in humans

Identifiers
- Aliases: RRAGC, GTR2, RAGC, TIB929, Ras related GTP binding C
- External IDs: OMIM: 608267; MGI: 1858751; GeneCards: RRAGC
Available structures
PDB	Ortholog search: PDBe RCSB
PDB	List of PDB id codes 3LLU

Gene location (Human)
Chr.	Chromosome 1 (human)
Band	1p34.3	Start	38,838,198 bp
Band	1p34.3	End	38,859,772 bp

Gene location (Mouse)
Chr.	Chromosome 4 (mouse)
Band	4|4 D2.2	Start	123,811,239 bp
Band	4|4 D2.2	End	123,830,790 bp
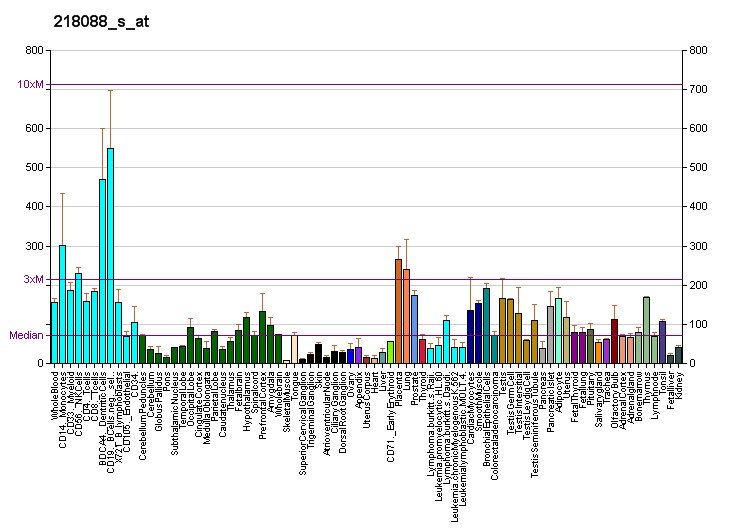
RNA expression pattern
Bgee	Human / Mouse (ortholog); Top expressed in: islet of Langerhans; monocyte; skin of leg; tibial arteries; smooth muscle tissue; skin of abdomen; ventricular zone; gastric mucosa; stromal cell of endometrium; right coronary artery / Top expressed in: secondary oocyte; primary oocyte; stroma of bone marrow; calvaria; zygote; brown adipose tissue; endothelial cell of lymphatic vessel; motor neuron; decidua; white adipose tissue; More reference expression data
BioGPS	More reference expression data
Gene ontology
Molecular function	nucleotide binding; GTP binding; protein binding; GTPase activity; magnesium ion binding; GDP binding; protein heterodimerization activity; GTPase binding
Cellular component	cytoplasm; cytosol; intracellular membrane-bounded organelle; lysosome; nucleus; Gtr1-Gtr2 GTPase complex
Biological process	regulation of TOR signaling; small GTPase mediated signal transduction; cellular response to amino acid starvation; transcription, DNA-templated; cell growth; RNA splicing; apoptotic process; regulation of TORC1 signaling; response to amino acid; regulation of autophagy; regulation of macroautophagy; positive regulation of TOR signaling; cellular response to amino acid stimulus; cellular response to starvation
Sources:Amigo / QuickGO
Orthologs
Databases	NCBI: entry; OMA: entry
Species	Human	Mouse
Entrez	64121	54170
Ensembl	ENSG00000116954	ENSMUSG00000028646
UniProt	Q9HB90	Q99K70
RefSeq (mRNA)	NM_022157; NM_001271851	NM_017475
RefSeq (protein)	NP_001258780; NP_071440	NP_059503
Location (UCSC)	Chr 1: 38.84 – 38.86 Mb	Chr 4: 123.81 – 123.83 Mb
PubMed search
- Wikidata
View/Edit Human	View/Edit Mouse

Ras-related GTP binding C, also known as RRAGC, is a protein which in humans is encoded by the RRAGC gene.

RRAGC is a monomeric guanine nucleotide-binding protein, or G protein. By binding GTP or GDP, small G proteins act as molecular switches in numerous cell processes and signaling pathways.

== Interactions ==
RRAGC has been shown to interact with RRAGA.
