= TROAP =

Protein-coding gene in the species Homo sapiens

Identifiers
- Aliases: TROAP, TASTIN, trophinin associated protein
- External IDs: OMIM: 603872; MGI: 1925983; HomoloGene: 28697; GeneCards: TROAP; OMA:TROAP - orthologs

Gene location (Human)
Chr.	Chromosome 12 (human)
Band	12q13.12	Start	49,323,236 bp
Band	12q13.12	End	49,331,731 bp

Gene location (Mouse)
Chr.	Chromosome 15 (mouse)
Band	15|15 F1	Start	98,972,456 bp
Band	15|15 F1	End	98,981,290 bp
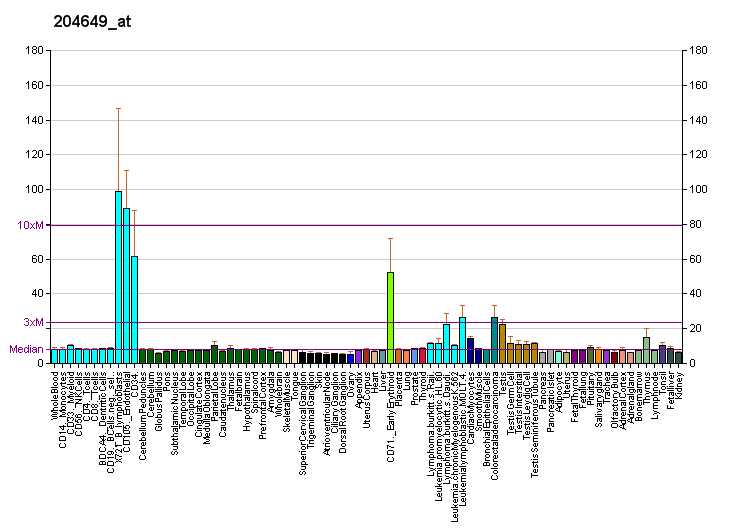
RNA expression pattern
Bgee	Human / Mouse (ortholog); Top expressed in: oocyte; secondary oocyte; ventricular zone; ganglionic eminence; left testis; right testis; gonad; mucosa of transverse colon; bone marrow; bone marrow cells / Top expressed in: zygote; yolk sac; secondary oocyte; ventricular zone; genital tubercle; tail of embryo; embryo; embryo; spermatocyte; epiblast; More reference expression data
BioGPS	More reference expression data
Gene ontology
Molecular function	protein binding
Cellular component	cytoplasm
Biological process	cell adhesion
Sources:Amigo / QuickGO
Orthologs
Species	Human	Mouse
Entrez	10024	78733
Ensembl	ENSG00000135451	ENSMUSG00000032783
UniProt	Q12815	B7ZNG4
RefSeq (mRNA)	NM_001100620; NM_001278324; NM_005480	NM_001162506; NM_030159
RefSeq (protein)	NP_001094090; NP_001265253; NP_005471	NP_001155978; NP_084435
Location (UCSC)	Chr 12: 49.32 – 49.33 Mb	Chr 15: 98.97 – 98.98 Mb
PubMed search
- Wikidata
View/Edit Human	View/Edit Mouse

Trophinin-associated protein is a protein that in humans is encoded by the TROAP gene.

== Interactions ==
TROAP has been shown to interact with BYSL.
