= Galectin-8 =

Protein found in humans

LGALS8
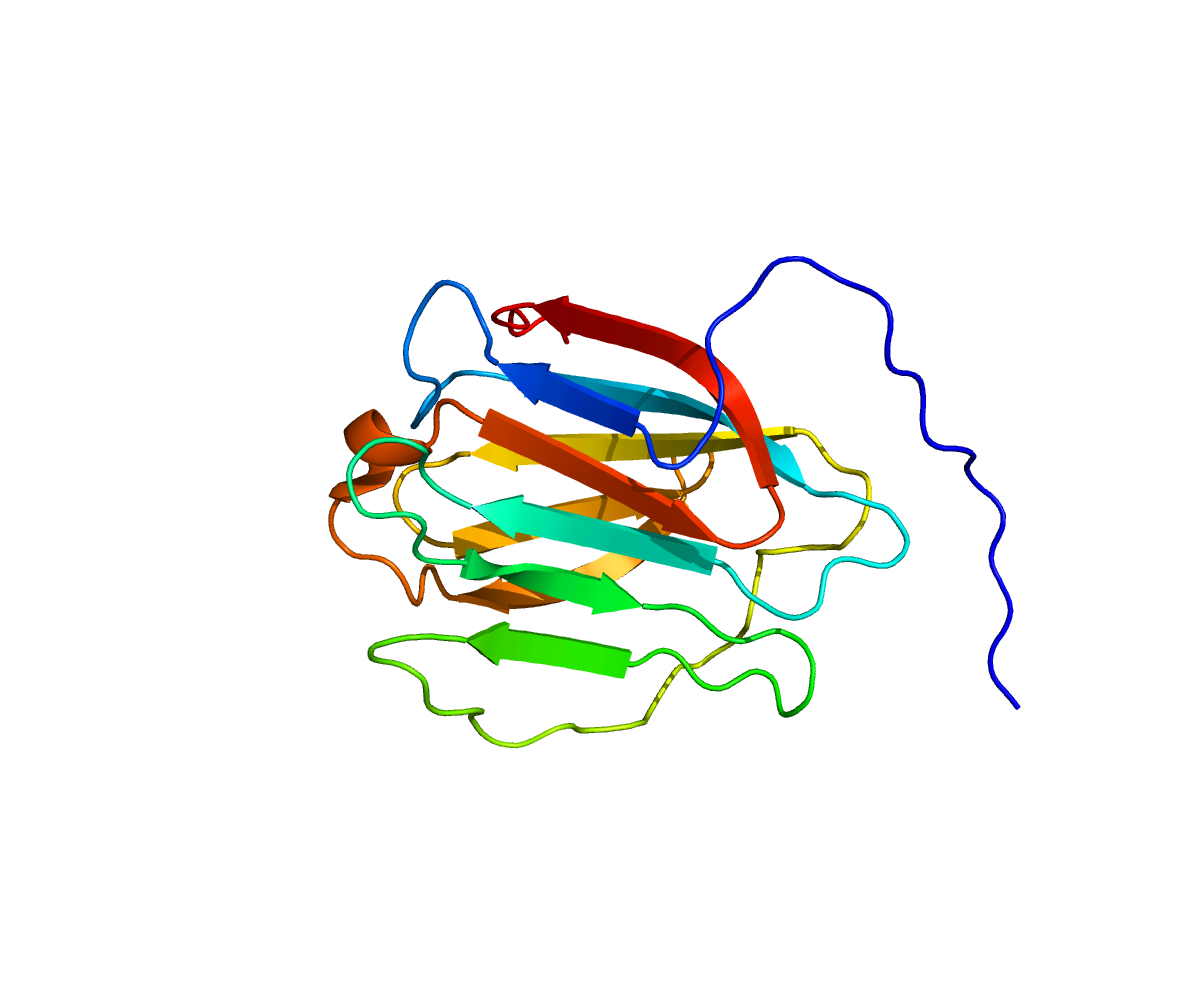

Identifiers
- Aliases: LGALS8, Gal-8, PCTA-1, PCTA1, Po66-CBP, galectin 8
- External IDs: OMIM: 606099; MGI: 1928481; GeneCards: LGALS8
Available structures
PDB	Ortholog search: PDBe RCSB
PDB	List of PDB id codes 2YRO, 2YV8, 2YXS, 3AP4, 3AP5, 3AP6, 3AP7, 3AP9, 3APB, 3OJB, 3VKL, 3VKM, 3VKN, 3VKO, 4BMB, 4BME, 4FQZ, 4GXL, 4HAN

Gene location (Human)
Chr.	Chromosome 1 (human)
Band	1q43	Start	236,518,000 bp
Band	1q43	End	236,552,981 bp

Gene location (Mouse)
Chr.	Chromosome 13 (mouse)
Band	13 A1|13 4.64 cM	Start	12,454,296 bp
Band	13 A1|13 4.64 cM	End	12,479,825 bp
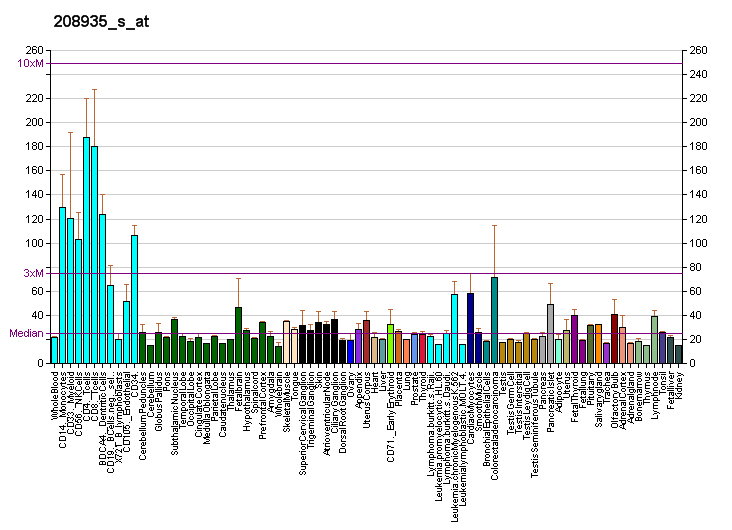

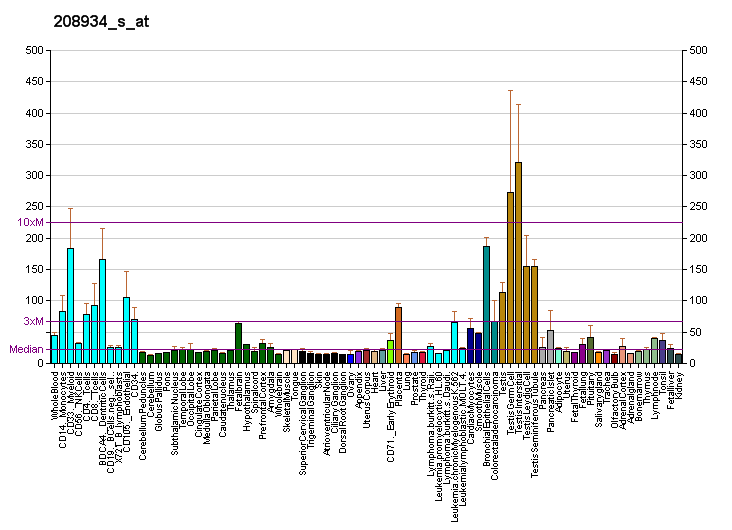

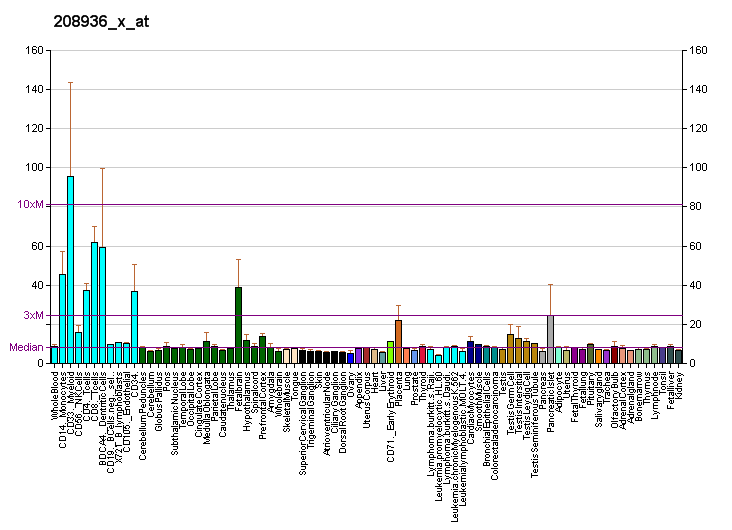
RNA expression pattern
Bgee	Human / Mouse (ortholog); Top expressed in: sperm; germinal epithelium; monocyte; gallbladder; skin of abdomen; olfactory zone of nasal mucosa; skin of leg; left testis; glomerulus; spleen / Top expressed in: spermatid; seminiferous tubule; spermatocyte; neural layer of retina; left lobe of liver; stroma of bone marrow; right kidney; duodenum; morula; morula; More reference expression data
BioGPS	More reference expression data
Gene ontology
Molecular function	protein binding; carbohydrate binding; integrin binding
Cellular component	extracellular exosome; membrane; extracellular space; cytosol; cytoplasmic vesicle; cytoplasm
Biological process	xenophagy; autophagy; cellular response to virus; lymphatic endothelial cell migration
Sources:Amigo / QuickGO
Orthologs
Databases	NCBI: entry; OMA: entry
Species	Human	Mouse
Entrez	3964	56048
Ensembl	ENSG00000116977	ENSMUSG00000057554
UniProt	O00214	Q9JL15
RefSeq (mRNA)	NM_006499; NM_201543; NM_201544; NM_201545	NM_001199043; NM_001291055; NM_001291057; NM_001291060; NM_018886
RefSeq (protein)	NP_006490; NP_963837; NP_963838; NP_963839	NP_001185972; NP_001277984; NP_001277986; NP_001277989; NP_061374
Location (UCSC)	Chr 1: 236.52 – 236.55 Mb	Chr 13: 12.45 – 12.48 Mb
PubMed search
- Wikidata
View/Edit Human	View/Edit Mouse

Galectin-8 is a protein of the galectin family that in humans is encoded by the LGALS8 gene.

== Function ==
This gene encodes a member of the galectin family. Galectins are beta-galactoside-binding animal lectins with conserved carbohydrate recognition domains. The galectins have been implicated in many essential functions including development, differentiation, cell-cell adhesion, cell-matrix interaction, growth regulation, apoptosis, and RNA splicing. This gene is widely expressed in tumoral tissues and seems to be involved in integrin-like cell interactions. Alternatively spliced transcript variants encoding different isoforms have been identified.

Galectin-8, interacts with the mTOR regulatory system composed of SLC38A9, Ragulator, RagAB, RagCD. Galectin-8 controls mTOR causing its inactivation and dissociation from damaged lysosomes, hence transducing the breach of the lysosomal membrane to mTOR. The physiological consequences of mTOR inhibition following lysosomal membrane damage encompass autophagy and metabolic switching.

== Galectin-8 levels ==
Circulating galectin levels in the serum of healthy individuals typically range between 0.1 and 166.3 ng/mL, with a median concentration of approximately 6 ng/mL. In cancer patients, these levels can increase up to fivefold.

== Role in cancer ==
Galectin-8 has a complex role in cancer, sometimes being protumorigenic and other times anti-tumorigenic.

== Role in cellular defence ==
Galectin-8 has recently been shown to have a role in cellular defence, against both bacterial cytosolic infection and vacuolar damage. Many intracellular bacteria, such as S. enterica serovar Typhimurium and S. flexneri prefer to replicate inside and outside of the vacuole safety respectively, yet these vacuoles may become damaged, exposing bacteria to the host cell cytoplasm. It has been shown that the binding of galectin-8 to the damaged vacuole can recruit autophagy adaptors such as NDP52 leading to the formation of an autophagosome and subsequent bacterial destruction. As knockout experiments of galectin-8 leads to more successful cytosolic replication by S. enterica serovar Typhimurium, it is thought that galectin-8 acts as a danger receptor in defence against intracellular pathogens.

== Engineered galectin-8 assays ==
Galectin-8 has also been used to study endosomal disruption in the development of nanoscale drug delivery systems. Many drug delivery systems carrying large molecule drugs, such as antisense oligonucleotides, siRNA, peptides, and therapeutic proteins, are engineered to be pH-responsive, and disrupt the endosomal membrane because of the lower pH found within progressively acidifying endosomes. Galectin-8 can be tagged with a fluorophore to track these disrupted endosomal membranes, especially when coupled with automated microscopy.

== Interactions ==
Galectin-8 has been shown to interact with CD44, CD49d, CD29 and CD49c. It also interacts with components of the mTORC1 complex.
