= RRAGA =

Protein-coding gene in the species Homo sapiens

Identifiers
- Aliases: RRAGA, FIP-1, FIP1, RAGA, Ras related GTP binding A
- External IDs: OMIM: 612194; MGI: 1915691; GeneCards: RRAGA

Gene location (Human)
Chr.	Chromosome 9 (human)
Band	9p22.1	Start	19,049,427 bp
Band	9p22.1	End	19,051,025 bp

Gene location (Mouse)
Chr.	Chromosome 4 (mouse)
Band	4|4 C4	Start	86,493,905 bp
Band	4|4 C4	End	86,495,522 bp
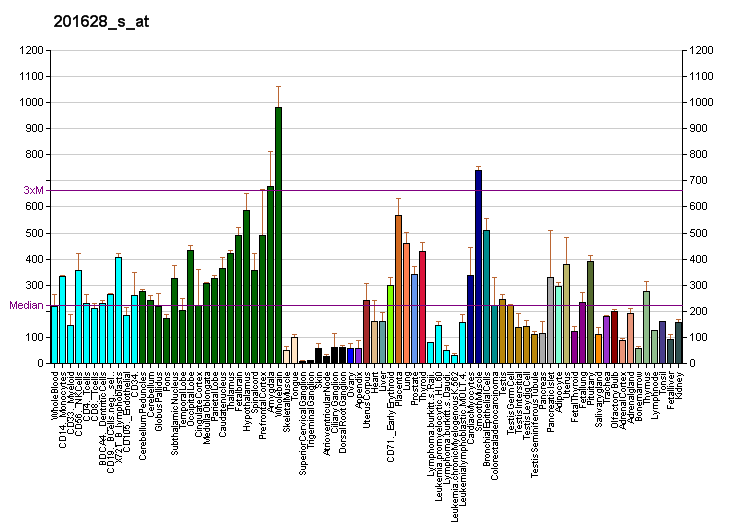
RNA expression pattern
Bgee	Human / Mouse (ortholog); Top expressed in: paraflocculus of cerebellum; frontal pole; Brodmann area 10; middle frontal gyrus; cerebellar vermis; islet of Langerhans; smooth muscle tissue; Skeletal muscle tissue of biceps brachii; Skeletal muscle tissue of rectus abdominis; Brodmann area 9 / Top expressed in: zygote; secondary oocyte; dorsomedial hypothalamic nucleus; visual cortex; primary visual cortex; superior frontal gyrus; lateral hypothalamus; paraventricular nucleus of hypothalamus; choroid plexus of fourth ventricle; ventricular zone; More reference expression data
BioGPS	More reference expression data
Gene ontology
Molecular function	nucleotide binding; protein homodimerization activity; GTP binding; phosphoprotein binding; protein binding; GTPase activity; ubiquitin protein ligase binding; protein heterodimerization activity
Cellular component	cytoplasm; cytosol; GATOR1 complex; lysosomal membrane; lysosome; nucleus; Gtr1-Gtr2 GTPase complex
Biological process	cellular response to amino acid starvation; cell death; positive regulation of cytolysis; positive regulation of TORC1 signaling; modulation by virus of host process; cellular response to amino acid stimulus; viral process; negative regulation of autophagy; positive regulation of TOR signaling; apoptotic process; protein ubiquitination; regulation of macroautophagy; cellular response to starvation; regulation of autophagy
Sources:Amigo / QuickGO
Orthologs
Databases	NCBI: entry; OMA: entry
Species	Human	Mouse
Entrez	10670	68441
Ensembl	ENSG00000155876	ENSMUSG00000070934
UniProt	Q7L523	Q80X95
RefSeq (mRNA)	NM_006570	NM_178376
RefSeq (protein)	NP_006561	NP_848463
Location (UCSC)	Chr 9: 19.05 – 19.05 Mb	Chr 4: 86.49 – 86.5 Mb
PubMed search
- Wikidata
View/Edit Human	View/Edit Mouse

Ras-related GTP-binding protein A is a protein that in humans is encoded by the RRAGA gene.

== Interactions ==
RRAGA has been shown to interact with NOL8 and RRAGC.
