= Galectin-2 =

Protein-coding gene in the species Homo sapiens

LGALS2
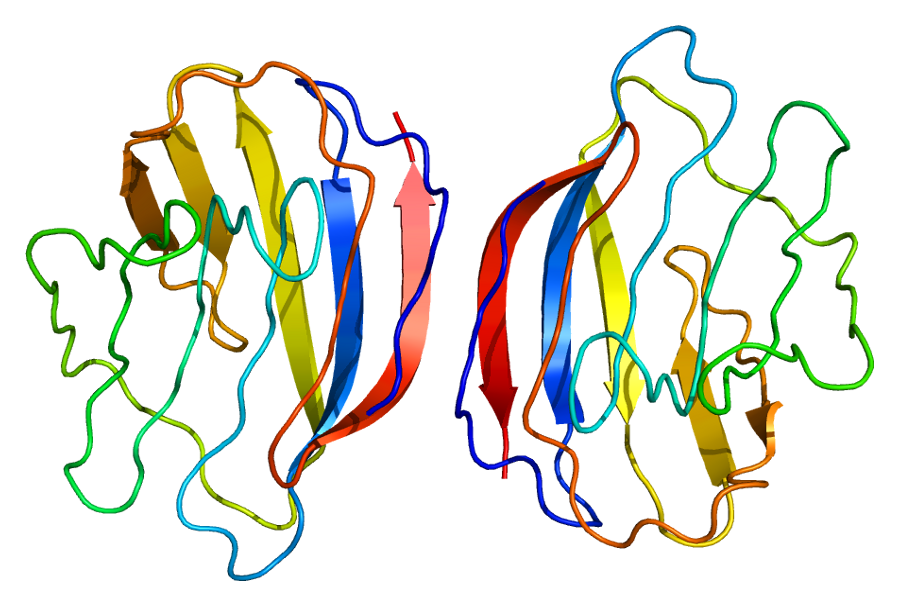

Identifiers
- Aliases: LGALS2, HL14, galectin 2
- External IDs: OMIM: 150571; MGI: 895068; GeneCards: LGALS2
Available structures
PDB	Ortholog search: PDBe RCSB
PDB	List of PDB id codes 1HLC

Gene location (Human)
Chr.	Chromosome 22 (human)
Band	22q13.1	Start	37,570,248 bp
Band	22q13.1	End	37,582,616 bp

Gene location (Mouse)
Chr.	Chromosome 15 (mouse)
Band	15|15 E1	Start	78,735,060 bp
Band	15|15 E1	End	78,739,729 bp
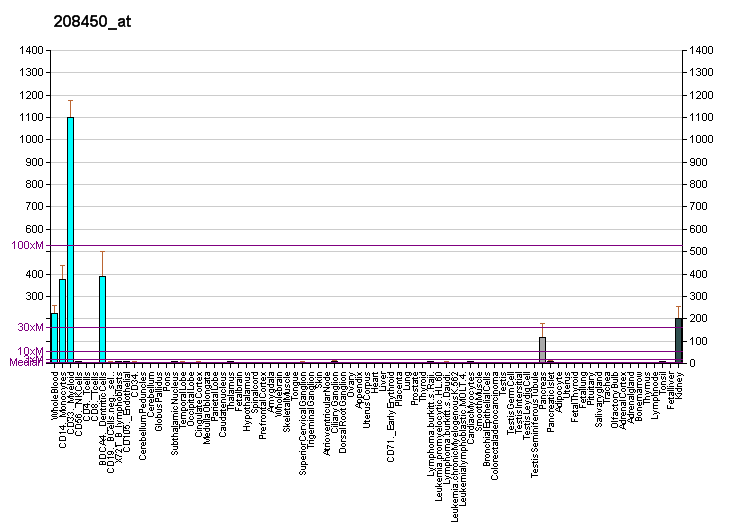
RNA expression pattern
Bgee	Human / Mouse (ortholog); Top expressed in: gallbladder; monocyte; pancreatic ductal cell; rectum; granulocyte; mucosa of transverse colon; human kidney; body of pancreas; mucosa of ileum; mucosa of sigmoid colon / Top expressed in: gastric mucosa; epithelium of stomach; mucous cell of stomach; crypt of lieberkuhn of small intestine; pyloric antrum; duodenum; migratory enteric neural crest cell; ileum; intestinal epithelium; epithelium of small intestine; More reference expression data
BioGPS	More reference expression data
Orthologs
Databases	NCBI: entry; OMA: entry
Species	Human	Mouse
Entrez	3957	107753
Ensembl	ENSG00000100079	ENSMUSG00000043501
UniProt	P05162	Q9CQW5
RefSeq (mRNA)	NM_006498	NM_025622
RefSeq (protein)	NP_006489	NP_079898
Location (UCSC)	Chr 22: 37.57 – 37.58 Mb	Chr 15: 78.74 – 78.74 Mb
PubMed search
- Wikidata
View/Edit Human	View/Edit Mouse

Galectin-2 is a protein that in humans is encoded by the LGALS2 gene.

The protein encoded by this gene is a soluble beta-galactoside binding lectin. The encoded protein is found as a homodimer and can bind to Lymphotoxin alpha. A single nucleotide polymorphism in an intron of this gene can alter the transcriptional level of the protein, with a resultant increased risk of myocardial infarction.
