= IMP4 =

Protein-coding gene in the species Homo sapiens

Identifiers
- Aliases: IMP4, BXDC4, IMP4 homolog, U3 small nucleolar ribonucleoprotein, U3 small nucleolar ribonucleoprotein, IMP U3 small nucleolar ribonucleoprotein 4
- External IDs: OMIM: 612981; MGI: 106572; GeneCards: IMP4

Gene location (Human)
Chr.	Chromosome 2 (human)
Band	2q21.1	Start	130,342,877 bp
Band	2q21.1	End	130,347,967 bp

Gene location (Mouse)
Chr.	Chromosome 1 (mouse)
Band	1 B|1 13.22 cM	Start	34,478,932 bp
Band	1 B|1 13.22 cM	End	34,488,437 bp
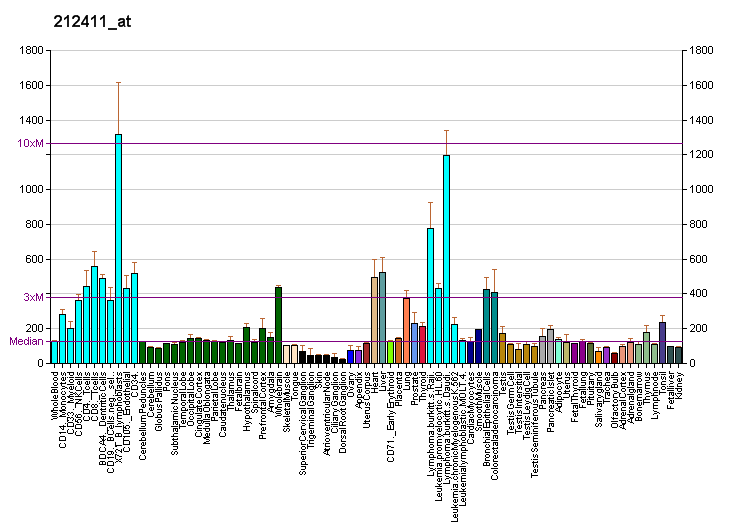
RNA expression pattern
Bgee	Human / Mouse (ortholog); Top expressed in: body of pancreas; gastrocnemius muscle; body of stomach; right lobe of liver; muscle of thigh; mucosa of transverse colon; left coronary artery; prefrontal cortex; granulocyte; apex of heart / Top expressed in: zygote; yolk sac; primary oocyte; morula; morula; embryo; epiblast; embryo; right kidney; secondary oocyte; More reference expression data
BioGPS	More reference expression data
Gene ontology
Molecular function	protein binding; rRNA primary transcript binding; snoRNA binding
Cellular component	small-subunit processome; nucleolus; nucleus; nucleoplasm; fibrillar center; preribosome; Mpp10 complex
Biological process	ribosome biogenesis; rRNA processing
Sources:Amigo / QuickGO
Orthologs
Databases	NCBI: entry; OMA: entry
Species	Human	Mouse
Entrez	92856	27993
Ensembl	ENSG00000136718	ENSMUSG00000026127
UniProt	Q96G21	Q8VHZ7
RefSeq (mRNA)	NM_033416; NM_001320304; NM_001320305; NM_001320306; NM_001320307 NM_001320309; NM_001320310; NM_001320311; NM_001371725; NM_001371726; NM_001371728; NM_001371730; NM_001371731; NM_001371732; NM_001371733; NM_001371734	NM_178601
RefSeq (protein)	NP_001307233; NP_001307234; NP_001307235; NP_001307236; NP_001307238 NP_001307239; NP_001307240; NP_219484; NP_001358654; NP_001358655; NP_001358657; NP_001358659; NP_001358660; NP_001358661; NP_001358662; NP_001358663	NP_848716
Location (UCSC)	Chr 2: 130.34 – 130.35 Mb	Chr 1: 34.48 – 34.49 Mb
PubMed search
- Wikidata
View/Edit Human	View/Edit Mouse

U3 small nucleolar ribonucleoprotein protein IMP4 is a protein that in humans is encoded by the IMP4 gene.
