= Solute carrier family 38 member 9 =

Protein-coding gene in the species Homo sapiens

SLC38A9

Identifiers
- Aliases: SLC38A9, URLC11, solute carrier family 38 member 9
- External IDs: OMIM: 616203; MGI: 1918839; HomoloGene: 18139; GeneCards: SLC38A9; OMA:SLC38A9 - orthologs

Gene location (Human)
Chr.	Chromosome 5 (human)
Band	5q11.2	Start	55,625,845 bp
Band	5q11.2	End	55,773,194 bp

Gene location (Mouse)
Chr.	Chromosome 13 (mouse)
Band	13|13 D2.2	Start	112,797,285 bp
Band	13|13 D2.2	End	112,875,283 bp
RNA expression pattern
Bgee	Human / Mouse (ortholog); Top expressed in: secondary oocyte; placenta; pancreatic epithelial cell; buccal mucosa cell; Achilles tendon; tibia; body of pancreas; germinal epithelium; gonad; bone marrow cell / Top expressed in: lumbar spinal ganglion; spermatid; spermatocyte; bone marrow; otolith organ; utricle; hand; secondary oocyte; seminal vesicula; pineal gland; More reference expression data
BioGPS	n/a
Gene ontology
Molecular function	protein binding; amino acid transmembrane transporter activity; L-leucine transmembrane transporter activity; L-arginine transmembrane transporter activity; metal ion binding
Cellular component	integral component of membrane; endosome; Ragulator complex; late endosome; lysosome; membrane; late endosome membrane; nucleoplasm; intracellular membrane-bounded organelle; lysosomal membrane; integral component of lysosomal membrane
Biological process	cellular response to amino acid stimulus; amino acid transmembrane transport; amino acid transport; positive regulation of TOR signaling; regulation of macroautophagy; branched-chain amino acid transport; neutral amino acid transport; cation transmembrane transport; L-alpha-amino acid transmembrane transport
Sources:Amigo / QuickGO
Orthologs
Species	Human	Mouse
Entrez	153129	268706
Ensembl	ENSG00000177058	ENSMUSG00000047789
UniProt	Q8NBW4	Q8BGD6
RefSeq (mRNA)	NM_001258286; NM_001258287; NM_001282429; NM_173514; NM_001349382 NM_001349383; NM_001349384; NM_001349385	NM_175376; NM_178746
RefSeq (protein)	NP_001245215; NP_001245216; NP_001269358; NP_775785; NP_001336311 NP_001336312; NP_001336313; NP_001336314	NP_848861
Location (UCSC)	Chr 5: 55.63 – 55.77 Mb	Chr 13: 112.8 – 112.88 Mb
PubMed search
- Wikidata
View/Edit Human	View/Edit Mouse

Solute carrier family 38 member 9 is a protein that in humans is encoded by the SLC38A9 gene.
