= BYSL =

Protein-coding gene in the species Homo sapiens

Identifiers
- Aliases: BYSL, BYSTIN, bystin like, Enp1
- External IDs: OMIM: 603871; MGI: 1858419; HomoloGene: 2991; GeneCards: BYSL; OMA:BYSL - orthologs

Gene location (Human)
Chr.	Chromosome 6 (human)
Band	6p21.1	Start	41,921,499 bp
Band	6p21.1	End	41,933,046 bp

Gene location (Mouse)
Chr.	Chromosome 17 (mouse)
Band	17 C|17 23.63 cM	Start	47,910,256 bp
Band	17 C|17 23.63 cM	End	47,922,417 bp
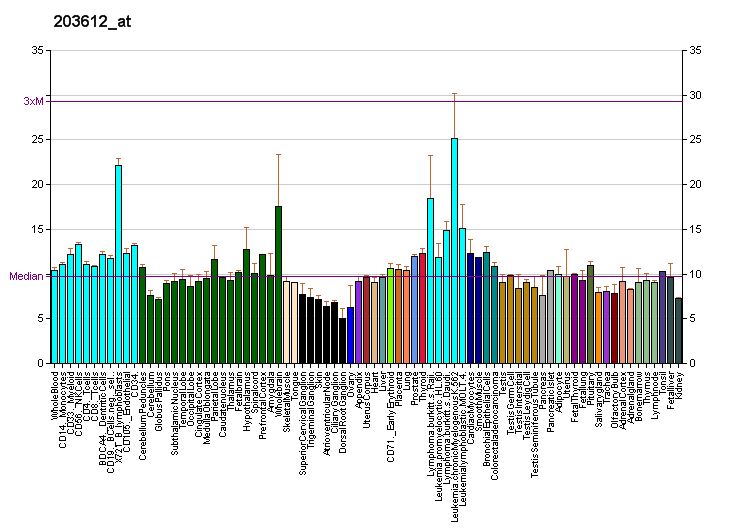
RNA expression pattern
Bgee	Human / Mouse (ortholog); Top expressed in: gonad; gastrocnemius muscle; testicle; islet of Langerhans; embryo; ganglionic eminence; right adrenal gland; stromal cell of endometrium; left adrenal gland; right adrenal cortex / Top expressed in: otic placode; saccule; otic vesicle; cardiac muscle tissue of left ventricle; fetal liver hematopoietic progenitor cell; Ileal epithelium; somite; endothelial cell of lymphatic vessel; primitive streak; epiblast; More reference expression data
BioGPS	More reference expression data
Gene ontology
Molecular function	protein binding; RNA binding; snoRNA binding
Cellular component	cytoplasm; membrane; intracellular membrane-bounded organelle; apical part of cell; nucleolus; nucleus; cytosol; nucleoplasm; preribosome, small subunit precursor
Biological process	maturation of SSU-rRNA from tricistronic rRNA transcript (SSU-rRNA, 5.8S rRNA, LSU-rRNA); ribosome biogenesis; female pregnancy; in utero embryonic development; blastocyst formation; cell adhesion; trophectodermal cell differentiation; cell population proliferation; rRNA processing
Sources:Amigo / QuickGO
Orthologs
Species	Human	Mouse
Entrez	705	53414
Ensembl	ENSG00000112578	ENSMUSG00000023988
UniProt	Q13895	O54825
RefSeq (mRNA)	NM_004053	NM_016859
RefSeq (protein)	NP_004044	NP_058555
Location (UCSC)	Chr 6: 41.92 – 41.93 Mb	Chr 17: 47.91 – 47.92 Mb
PubMed search
- Wikidata
View/Edit Human	View/Edit Mouse

Bystin is a protein that in humans is encoded by the BYSL gene.

== Function ==
Bystin is expressed as a 2-kb major transcript and a 3.6-kb minor transcript in SNG-M cells and in human trophoblastic teratocarcinoma HT-H cells. Protein binding assays determined that bystin binds directly to trophinin and tastin, and that binding is enhanced when cytokeratins 8 and 18 are present. Immunocytochemistry of HT-H cells showed that bystin colocalizes with trophinin, tastin, and the cytokeratins, suggesting that these molecules form a complex in trophectoderm cells at the time of implantation. Using immunohistochemistry it was determined that trophinin and bystin are found in the placenta from the sixth week of pregnancy. Both proteins were localized in the cytoplasm of the syncytiotrophoblast in the chorionic villi and in endometrial decidual cells at the uteroplacental interface. After week 10, the levels of trophinin, tastin, and bystin decreased and then disappeared from placental villi.

== Interactions ==
BYSL has been shown to interact with TROAP.
