= NIP7 =

Protein-coding gene in humans

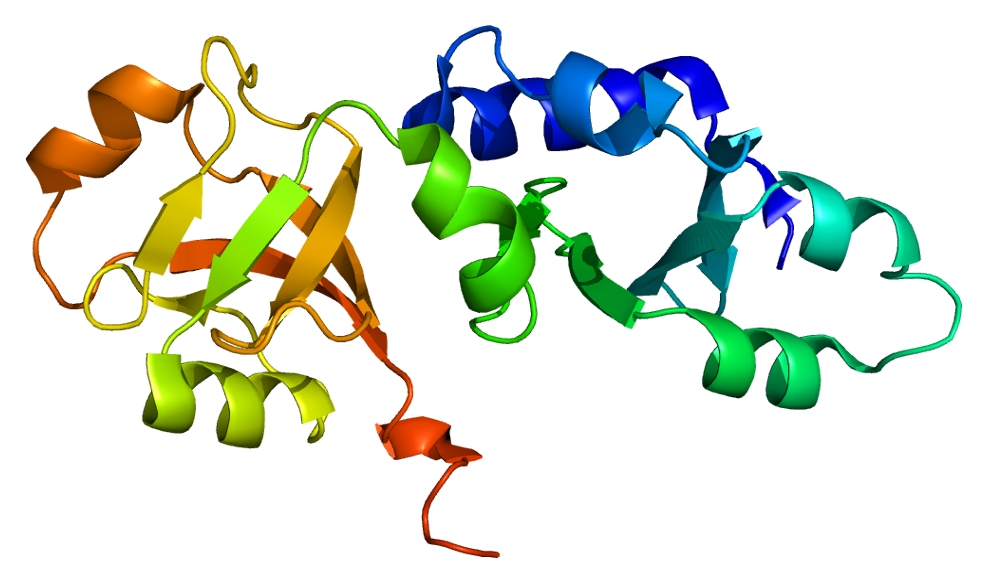

Identifiers
- Aliases: NIP7, HSPC031, KD93, CGI-37, nucleolar pre-rRNA processing protein, nucleolar pre-rRNA processing protein NIP7
- External IDs: MGI: 1913414; GeneCards: NIP7
Available structures
PDB	Ortholog search: PDBe RCSB
PDB	List of PDB id codes 1SQW, 1T5Y

Gene location (Human)
Chr.	Chromosome 16 (human)
Band	16q22.1	Start	69,337,996 bp
Band	16q22.1	End	69,343,106 bp

Gene location (Mouse)
Chr.	Chromosome 8 (mouse)
Band	8|8 D3	Start	107,783,509 bp
Band	8|8 D3	End	107,787,563 bp
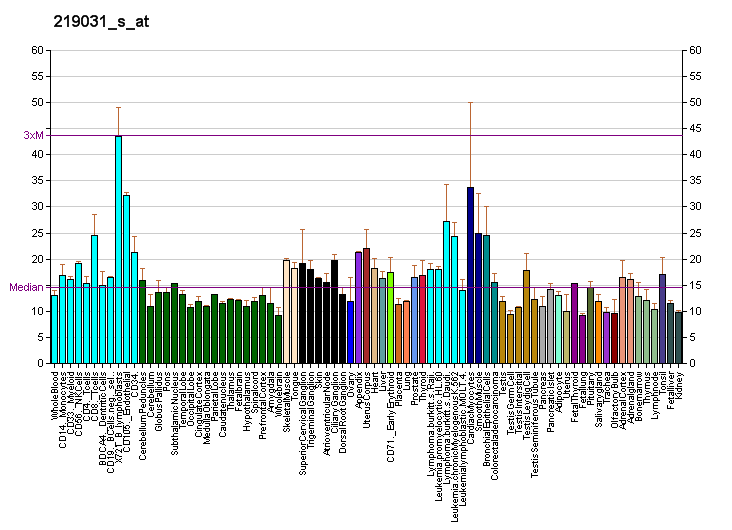
RNA expression pattern
Bgee	Human / Mouse (ortholog); Top expressed in: secondary oocyte; mucosa of pharynx; oral cavity; gonad; islet of Langerhans; nipple; gums; superior surface of tongue; rectum; gingival epithelium / Top expressed in: endocardial cushion; somite; epiblast; primitive streak; mandibular prominence; maxillary prominence; abdominal wall; otic placode; embryo; migratory enteric neural crest cell; More reference expression data
BioGPS	More reference expression data
Gene ontology
Molecular function	protein binding; RNA binding
Cellular component	nucleus; nucleolus; preribosome, large subunit precursor; cytosol
Biological process	ribosome biogenesis; ribosome assembly; ribosomal large subunit biogenesis
Sources:Amigo / QuickGO
Orthologs
Databases	NCBI: entry; OMA: entry
Species	Human	Mouse
Entrez	51388	66164
Ensembl	ENSG00000132603	ENSMUSG00000031917
UniProt	Q9Y221	Q9CXK8
RefSeq (mRNA)	NM_016101; NM_001199434	NM_001164472; NM_025391
RefSeq (protein)	NP_001186363; NP_057185	NP_001157944; NP_079667
Location (UCSC)	Chr 16: 69.34 – 69.34 Mb	Chr 8: 107.78 – 107.79 Mb
PubMed search
- Wikidata
View/Edit Human	View/Edit Mouse

60S ribosome subunit biogenesis protein NIP7 homolog is a protein that in humans is encoded by the NIP7 gene.

== Interactions ==
NIP7 has been shown to interact with NOL8.
