= CALCOCO2 =

Protein-coding gene in humans

Identifiers
- Aliases: CALCOCO2, NDP52, calcium binding and coiled-coil domain 2
- External IDs: OMIM: 604587; GeneCards: CALCOCO2
Available structures
PDB	Human UniProt search: PDBe RCSB
PDB	List of PDB id codes 3VVV, 3VVW, 4GXL, 4HAN, 2MXP, 4XKL

Gene location (Human)
Chr.	Chromosome 17 (human)
Band	17q21.32	Start	48,831,018 bp
Band	17q21.32	End	48,866,522 bp
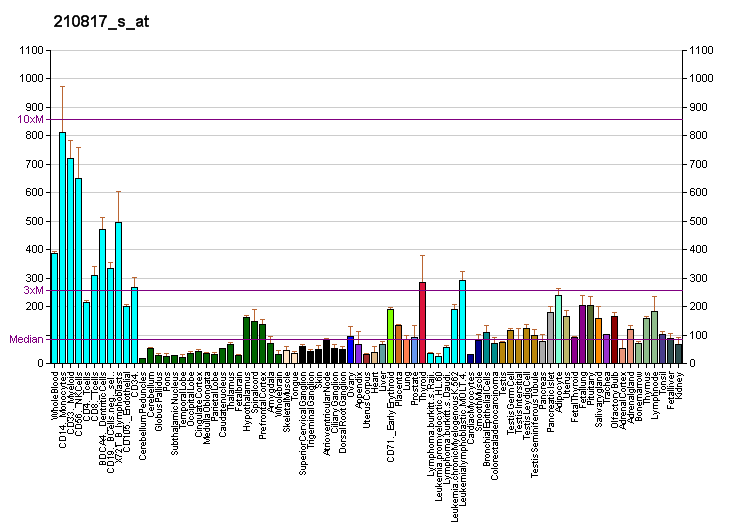
RNA expression pattern
Bgee	Human / Mouse (ortholog); Top expressed in: Achilles tendon; gastric mucosa; right lung; epithelium of colon; sural nerve; left testis; right testis; rectum; popliteal artery; tibial arteries / n/a; More reference expression data
BioGPS	More reference expression data
Gene ontology
Molecular function	protein binding; protein homodimerization activity
Cellular component	cytoplasm; perinuclear region of cytoplasm; autophagosome; autophagosome membrane; cytoskeleton; membrane; cytoplasmic vesicle; nucleus; intracellular membrane-bounded organelle; cytosol
Biological process	autophagy; viral process; positive regulation of autophagosome maturation; response to interferon-gamma; xenophagy
Sources:Amigo / QuickGO
Orthologs
Databases	NCBI: entry; OMA: entry
Species	Human	Mouse
Entrez	10241	n/a
Ensembl	ENSG00000136436	n/a
UniProt	Q13137	n/a
RefSeq (mRNA)	NM_001261390; NM_001261391; NM_001261393; NM_001261395; NM_005831	n/a
RefSeq (protein)	NP_001248319; NP_001248320; NP_001248322; NP_001248324; NP_005822	n/a
Location (UCSC)	Chr 17: 48.83 – 48.87 Mb	n/a
PubMed search		n/a
- Wikidata
View/Edit Human

Calcium-binding and coiled-coil domain-containing protein 2 is a protein that in humans is encoded by the CALCOCO2 gene.

The protein encoded by this gene is a subunit of nuclear domain 10 (ND10) bodies. ND10 bodies are nuclear domains appearing immunohistochemically as ten dots per nucleus. They are believed to be associated with the nuclear matrix on the basis of their resistance to nuclease digestion and salt extraction. ND10 proteins are removed from the nucleus by HSV-1 infection and may have a role in viral life cycles.

CALCOCO2 is an autophagy receptor, and loss of CALCOCO2 in human beta cells has been linked to autophagy-mediated altered insulin granule homeostasis. Thus, mutations in CALCOCO2 have been linked to type 2 diabetes risk.

== Interactions ==
CALCOCO2 has been shown to interact with CVB3 3C.
