= List of signalling pathways =

In cell biology, there are a multitude of signalling pathways. Cell signalling is part of the molecular biology system that controls and coordinates the actions of cells.

- Akt/PKB signalling pathway
- AMPK signalling pathway
- cAMP-dependent pathway
- Eph/ephrin signalling pathway
- Hedgehog signalling pathway
- Hippo signalling pathway
- Insulin signal transduction pathway
- JAK-STAT signalling pathway
- MAPK/ERK signalling pathway
- mTOR signalling pathway
- Nodal signalling pathway
- Notch signalling pathway
- PI3K/AKT/mTOR signalling pathway
- TGF beta signalling pathway
- TLR signalling pathway
- VEGF signalling pathway
- Wnt signalling pathway
