= Ming Tatt Cheah =

Malaysian biologist

Ming Tatt Cheah (simplified Chinese: 谢明达; traditional Chinese: 謝明達; pinyin: Xiè Míng Dá) is a biologist specializing in immunology and oncology. Born and raised in Malaysia, Cheah attended Chung Ling High School in Georgetown, Penang. He later moved to the US for his college and graduate education and his subsequent career. He is currently working as a biotech venture capital investor in San Francisco.

Cheah attended Yale University for college and graduated with both master's and bachelor's degrees in Biology within four years. When he was at Yale, Cheah was a recipient of Howard Hughes Medical Institute's Future Scientists Fellowship and the Yale College Dean’s Research Fellowship for his work on riboswitch biochemistry and RNA splicing under the mentorship of Dr. Ronald Breaker. His work culminated in the publication of articles in the May 2007 issue of Nature and other journals. Cheah is also listed as a co-inventor on a patent on riboswitch-mediated regulation of RNA splicing in fungi based on the Nature publication.

After graduating from Yale, Cheah attended Stanford University School of Medicine with support from Smith Stanford Graduate Fellowship. He earned his PhD in Immunology under the mentorship of Dr. Irving Weissman, where he discovered and characterized a mechanism for how cancer cells control inflammation in the tumor microenvironment to suppress the immune response. Cheah also worked on other projects in the Weissman lab including the characterization of memory B cell formation, and functional differences in dendritic cells descended from myeloid vs. lymphoid lineages. During his time at Stanford, Cheah also served as a teaching assistant in multiple undergraduate and graduate courses at Stanford in immunology and virology. After leaving Stanford, Cheah joined McKinsey & Company as a management consultant, where he had the opportunity to advise companies on M&A, business strategy, and operations.

From 2016 to 2020, Cheah was at Roche/Genentech, where he worked in a number of different roles with expanding levels of responsibility and impact. Most recently, Cheah was a Group Manager, where he worked in the business development and competitive intelligence groups. In his role, Cheah had led teams to evaluate external technologies and companies to advise R&D, partnering, and business strategy. Notably, he led scientific diligence to select external clinical collaboration partners and molecules for Roche's novel clinical trial platforms in oncology. Cheah also advised on clinical development and commercial strategy for multiple drugs in different therapeutic areas, most recently for Tecentriq® (PD-L1 Ab), tiragolumb (TIGIT Ab), and ipatasertib (AKT inhibitor) in oncology, Ocrevus® (CD20 Ab) in multiple sclerosis, and beta amyloid programs in Alzheimer's disease.

In September 2020, Cheah went into biotech venture capital and joined Pivotal bioVenture Partners.
