= MK-2206 =

Names
- Preferred IUPAC name 8-[4-(1-Aminocyclobutyl)phenyl]-9-phenyl[1,2,4]triazolo[3,4-f][1,6]naphthyridin-3(2H)-one

Identifiers
CAS Number	1032349-93-1
3D model (JSmol)	Interactive image
ChEBI	CHEBI:67271
ChEMBL	ChEMBL1079175
ChemSpider	24658140
ECHA InfoCard	100.207.435
EC Number	682-246-4
PubChem CID	24964624
UNII	51HZG6MP1K
CompTox Dashboard (EPA)	DTXSID3048948
- InChI: InChI=1S/C25H21N5O/c26-25(12-4-13-25)18-9-7-17(8-10-18)22-19(16-5-2-1-3-6-16)15-20-21(27-22)11-14-30-23(20)28-29-24(30)31/h1-3,5-11,14-15H,4,12-13,26H2,(H,29,31) Key: ULDXWLCXEDXJGE-UHFFFAOYSA-N; InChI=1/C25H21N5O/c26-25(12-4-13-25)18-9-7-17(8-10-18)22-19(16-5-2-1-3-6-16)15-20-21(27-22)11-14-30-23(20)28-29-24(30)31/h1-3,5-11,14-15H,4,12-13,26H2,(H,29,31) Key: ULDXWLCXEDXJGE-UHFFFAOYAX
- SMILES: C1CC(C1)(C2=CC=C(C=C2)C3=C(C=C4C(=N3)C=CN5C4=NNC5=O)C6=CC=CC=C6)N

Properties
Chemical formula	C_{25}H_{21}N_{5}O
Molar mass	407.477 g·mol^{−1}
- Except where otherwise noted, data are given for materials in their standard state (at 25 °C [77 °F], 100 kPa). Infobox references

MK-2206 is a drug candidate being investigated to help treat cancer. Its chemical formula is C_{25}H_{21}N_{5}O. It acts as an allosteric AKT inhibitor.

It is a highly selective inhibitor of pan-Akt, namely, of all three Akt isoforms Akt1, Akt2, and Akt3.

It is intended to be used with other cancer therapies that advanced tumours may become resistant to.

== Clinical trials ==
2011: A phase 1 clinical trial of MK-2206 alone has reported it was well tolerated.
2014: A phase 1 clinical trial of MK-2206 with a variety of other agents in 72 patients with advanced cancer reported acceptable side-effects.
2016: MK-2206 is one of the treatments in the I-SPY2 Adaptive clinical trial for breast cancer that had been selected for later stage trials.
As of August 2017 31 phase II clinical trials are registered, many completed. e.g. in colorectal cancer, breast cancer, and many others.

== MK-2206 and COVID-19 ==
Data shown in a study preprint suggest that SARS-CoV-2 infection decreases cellular autophagy and that MK-2206, which induces autophagy, reduced virus replication by up to 88% in vitro. The study's authors propose that MK-2206 should be tested in clinical trials as a potential treatment for COVID-19.
