= PTEN =

PTEN may mean:

- Prime Time Entertainment Network
- PTEN (gene), a human tumour suppressor gene on chromosome 10 (and its protein: phosphatase and tensin homolog)

== See also ==
- Akt/PKB signaling pathway
- Discovery and development of mTOR inhibitors
- PI3K/AKT/mTOR pathway
- Akt inhibitor
