= BX-912 =

Names
- Preferred IUPAC name N-{3-[(5-Bromo-4-{[2-(1H-imidazol-5-yl)ethyl]amino}pyrimidin-2-yl)amino]phenyl}pyrrolidine-1-carboxamide

Identifiers
CAS Number	702674-56-4
3D model (JSmol)	Interactive image
ChEBI	CHEBI:91357
ChEMBL	ChEMBL3916849
ChemSpider	9929214
ECHA InfoCard	100.237.653
PubChem CID	11754511
UNII	Y7RG737FY6
CompTox Dashboard (EPA)	DTXSID30471901
- InChI: InChI=1S/C20H23BrN8O/c21-17-12-24-19(28-18(17)23-7-6-16-11-22-13-25-16)26-14-4-3-5-15(10-14)27-20(30)29-8-1-2-9-29/h3-5,10-13H,1-2,6-9H2,(H,22,25)(H,27,30)(H2,23,24,26,28) Key: DMMILYKXNCVKOJ-UHFFFAOYSA-N
- SMILES: BrC1=C(NCCC2=CN=CN2)N=C(NC2=CC=CC(NC(=O)N3CCCC3)=C2)N=C1

Properties
Chemical formula	C_{20}H_{23}BrN_{8}O
Molar mass	471.363 g·mol^{−1}
- Except where otherwise noted, data are given for materials in their standard state (at 25 °C [77 °F], 100 kPa). Infobox references

BX-912 is a small molecule that inhibits 3-phosphoinositide dependent protein kinase-1. The phosphoinositide 3-kinase/3-phosphoinositide-dependent kinase 1 (PDK1)/AKT signaling pathway plays a role in cancer cell growth, and tumor angiogenesis, and could be a new target for anti-cancer drugs.

Tumor angiogenesis and vascular patterning
