= APPL1 =

Protein-coding gene in the species Homo sapiens

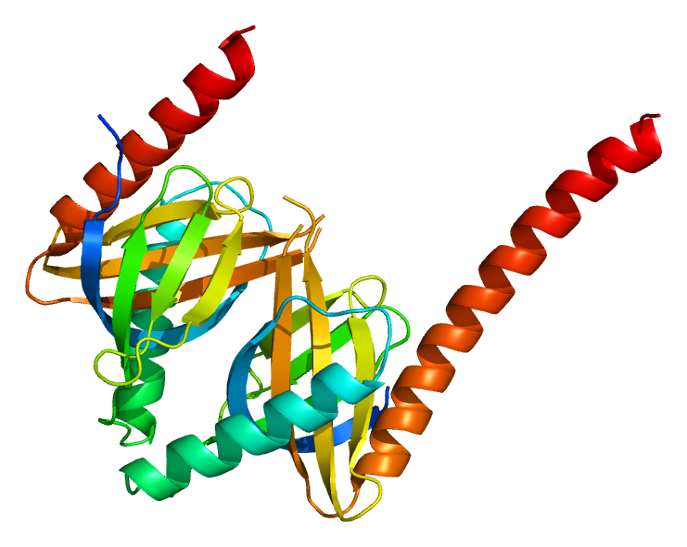

Identifiers
- Aliases: APPL1, APPL, DIP13alpha, MODY14, adaptor protein, phosphotyrosine interacting with PH domain and leucine zipper 1
- External IDs: OMIM: 604299; MGI: 1920243; GeneCards: APPL1
Available structures
PDB	Ortholog search: PDBe RCSB
PDB	List of PDB id codes 2EJ8, 2ELA, 2ELB, 2Q12, 2Q13, 2Z0N, 2Z0O, 5C5B

Gene location (Human)
Chr.	Chromosome 3 (human)
Band	3p14.3	Start	57,227,726 bp
Band	3p14.3	End	57,278,105 bp

Gene location (Mouse)
Chr.	Chromosome 14 (mouse)
Band	14|14 A3	Start	26,640,945 bp
Band	14|14 A3	End	26,693,189 bp
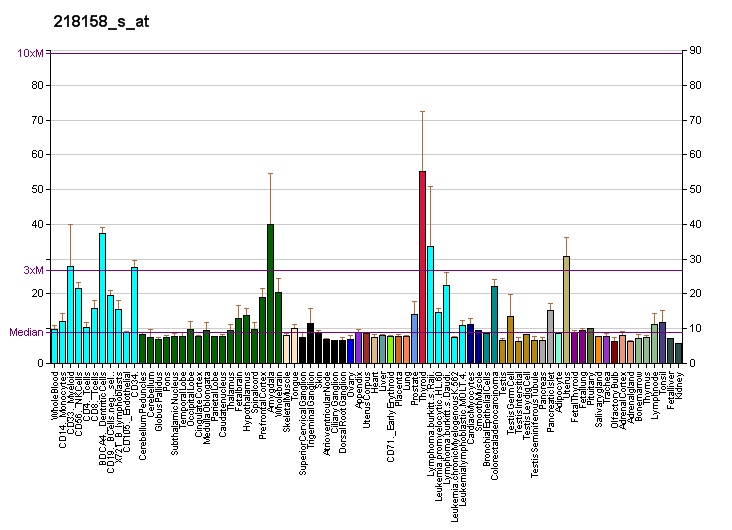
RNA expression pattern
Bgee	Human / Mouse (ortholog); Top expressed in: Achilles tendon; biceps brachii; germinal epithelium; body of pancreas; vastus lateralis muscle; human penis; gastrocnemius muscle; Skeletal muscle tissue of biceps brachii; muscle of thigh; Skeletal muscle tissue of rectus abdominis / Top expressed in: primary oocyte; aortic valve; ascending aorta; secondary oocyte; vestibular sensory epithelium; vestibular membrane of cochlear duct; substantia nigra; primitive streak; conjunctival fornix; iris; More reference expression data
BioGPS	More reference expression data
Gene ontology
Molecular function	protein kinase B binding; protein binding; identical protein binding; phosphatidylserine binding; phosphatidylinositol binding; protein homodimerization activity; protein-containing complex binding; beta-tubulin binding
Cellular component	cytoplasm; NuRD complex; cytosol; endosome; early endosome membrane; membrane; vesicle membrane; endosome membrane; extracellular exosome; nucleus; early endosome; ruffle; plasma membrane; cytoplasmic vesicle; early phagosome; macropinosome; intracellular vesicle; cell projection; phagocytic vesicle
Biological process	regulation of glucose import; extrinsic apoptotic signaling pathway in absence of ligand; cell cycle; cell population proliferation; signal transduction; insulin receptor signaling pathway; regulation of protein localization to plasma membrane; transforming growth factor beta receptor signaling pathway; regulation of fibroblast migration; signaling; adiponectin-activated signaling pathway; regulation of toll-like receptor 4 signaling pathway; cellular response to hepatocyte growth factor stimulus; regulation of innate immune response; positive regulation of glucose import; positive regulation of melanin biosynthetic process; positive regulation of cytokine production involved in inflammatory response; positive regulation of macropinocytosis; negative regulation of Fc-gamma receptor signaling pathway involved in phagocytosis; protein import into nucleus
Sources:Amigo / QuickGO
Orthologs
Databases	NCBI: entry; OMA: entry
Species	Human	Mouse
Entrez	26060	72993
Ensembl	ENSG00000157500	ENSMUSG00000040760
UniProt	Q9UKG1	Q8K3H0
RefSeq (mRNA)	NM_012096	NM_145221
RefSeq (protein)	NP_036228	NP_660256
Location (UCSC)	Chr 3: 57.23 – 57.28 Mb	Chr 14: 26.64 – 26.69 Mb
PubMed search
- Wikidata
View/Edit Human	View/Edit Mouse

Adaptor protein, phosphotyrosine interacting with PH domain and leucine zipper 1 (APPL1), or DCC-interacting protein 13-alpha (DIP13alpha), is a protein that in humans is encoded by the APPL1 gene. APPL1 contains several key interactory domains: pleckstrin homology (PH) domain, phosphotyrosine-binding (PTB) domain and Bin–Amphiphysin–Rvs (BAR) domain.

== Function ==
APPL1 is an adaptor protein localized to a subset of Rab5-positive ("early") endosomes, where it recruits other binding partners and regulates vesicle trafficking and endosomal signalling. APPL1 is enriched at very early endosomes which are negative for EEA1, indicating that APPL1 affects the earliest stages of endosomal traffic before EEA1 takes over. This is in line with observations that APPL1 and EEA1 compete for Rab5 binding. APPL1 affects the speed of internalization of key endosomal cargo (eg. EGF receptor) which is dependent on Rab5 activation.

PTB domain of APPL1 regulates many cell signalling events in specific endosomal compartments - sometimes termed the "signalling endosomes". This includes lysophosphatidic acid (LPA)-induced signaling (together with interacting protein GIPC1). Additional roles for APPL1 were pinpointed to the nucleus where APPL1 can localize once dissociated from endosomes.

== Mutant studies ==
Mouse Mutant Alleles for Appl1
Marker Symbol for Mouse Gene. This symbol is assigned to the genomic locus by the MGI	Appl1
Mutant Mouse Embryonic Stem Cell Clones. These are the known targeted mutations for this gene in a mouse.	Appl1^{tm1a(KOMP)Wtsi}
Example structure of targeted conditional mutant allele for this gene
Molecular structure of Appl1 region with inserted mutation sequence
These Mutant ES Cells can be studied directly or used to generate mice with this gene knocked out. Study of these mice can shed light on the function of Appl1: see Knockout mouse

== Interactions ==
APPL1 has been shown to interact with Deleted in Colorectal Cancer, AKT2, but also Rab5, Rab21, OCRL and almost 30 other proteins.
