= C24H23N5O =

The molecular formula C_{24}H_{23}N_{5}O (molar mass: 397.482 g/mol) may refer to:

- Apatinib
- Rizavasertib
