= Andrew K. Godwin =

American cancer researcher

- Education: University of Kansas (B.S.); University of Pennsylvania (Ph.D.)
- Scientific career
- Fields: Cancer research, molecular biology
- Workplaces: University of Kansas Medical Center; Fox Chase Cancer Center
- Website: www.kumc.edu/agodwin.html

Andrew K. Godwin is an American cancer researcher and the Chancellor's Distinguished Chair in Biomedical Sciences Endowed Professor at the University of Kansas Medical Center (KUMC). His research has included hereditary breast and ovarian cancer, ovarian-cancer genetics, cancer biomarkers, and extracellular vesicle signaling in gastrointestinal stromal tumor (GIST).

Godwin began his career at Fox Chase Cancer Center in Philadelphia, where he directed its Clinical Molecular Genetics Laboratory and Biosample Repository. He joined KUMC in 2010 and in 2013 became deputy director of the University of Kansas Cancer Center, a National Cancer Institute–designated center. He has held his named chair since 2012.

== Early life and education ==
Godwin grew up in Lawrence, Kansas. He received a B.S. in cellular biology from the University of Kansas in 1982 and a Ph.D. in molecular biology from the University of Pennsylvania, carrying out his thesis research at Fox Chase Cancer Center.

== Career ==
=== Fox Chase Cancer Center ===
Godwin stayed at Fox Chase after his doctorate. The Lawrence Journal-World reported in 2010 that he was the first person to move from graduate student at Fox Chase to full professor with tenure there. The center's directory listed him as an associate member of its Medical Science Division in 2001 and as a member by 2003; by 2006 he was also director of its Clinical Molecular Genetics Laboratory and its Biosample Repository. The repository's operations were based on protocols Godwin had first set up for Fox Chase's Family Risk Assessment Program and other risk-assessment programs.

=== University of Kansas ===
Godwin joined KUMC in 2010 as professor of pathology and laboratory medicine and director of molecular oncology, and became associate director for translational research at the University of Kansas Cancer Center that November. He was named to the Chancellor's Distinguished Chair in Biomedical Sciences Endowed Professorship in 2012 and became the cancer center's deputy director in May 2013. In 2019, he received the Dolph Simons Award in the Biomedical Sciences, one of the Higuchi–KU Endowment Research Achievement Awards, which recognize long-term research accomplishments by faculty at Kansas Board of Regents universities.

At KUMC he was the founding director of the Clinical Molecular Oncology Laboratory, a CLIA-certified, CAP-accredited diagnostics laboratory now part of the University of Kansas Health System, and of the Biospecimen Repository Core Facility. The NCI lists him as director of the cancer center's biospecimen shared resource.

== Research ==
=== Hereditary breast and ovarian cancer ===
In a 1996 study of ovaries removed preventively from 20 women at high inherited risk of ovarian cancer, Salazar, Godwin and colleagues reported unexpected microscopic cancers and more frequent atypical tissue changes than in control ovaries, which they proposed as a preneoplastic phenotype. In a 2008 review, Keren Levanon, Christopher Crum and Ronny Drapkin listed it among studies reporting such abnormalities in prophylactic specimens while noting that other studies disputed them. A 2013 review by Dubeau and Drapkin cited the work while discussing evidence that some cancers historically classified as ovarian may originate outside the ovary. Godwin was also a co-author of a 1999 multicenter study examining breast-cancer risk following preventive removal of the ovaries in BRCA1 mutation carriers. In 2003 Godwin co-authored a study describing BRCC, a protein complex containing BRCA1, BRCA2 and RAD51. A 2010 review by Michael Huen, Shirley Sy and Junjie Chen described BRCC as a homologous-recombination repair complex containing BRCC36 and BRCC45 and cited the 2003 study.

=== Ovarian cancer genetics ===
In 1992 he co-authored a PNAS report that the AKT2 gene is amplified and overexpressed in some ovarian carcinomas. Reviews of ovarian cancer by Ie-Ming Shih and Robert Kurman (2004) and by Ernst Lengyel (2010) cite this finding among the genetic alterations of high-grade serous carcinoma.

=== Gastrointestinal stromal tumor and extracellular vesicles ===
In 2014 Safinur Atay and colleagues in Godwin's laboratory reported that GIST cells release exosomes carrying the oncogenic KIT protein, which convert nearby smooth muscle cells into tumor-promoting cells and increase invasion. A 2016 review of extracellular vesicles in metastasis by Annette Becker and colleagues cited the study as evidence that tumor exosomes can convert stromal cells to promote invasion.

== Selected awards and honors ==
- 2010 - Named a Kansas Bioscience Authority Eminent Scholar
- 2018 - Chancellors Club Research Award, KU Endowment
- 2021 - Rich and Judy Billings Spirit of 1912 Award, jointly with Cecilia Romero Godwin, recognizing service and involvement with the University of Kansas
