= Engasertib =

Investigational drug

Identifiers
- IUPAC name: 6-[4-(1-amino-3-hydroxycyclobutyl)phenyl]-1-ethyl-7-phenylpyrido[2,3-b][1,4]oxazin-2-one
- CAS Number: 1313439-71-2
- PubChem CID: 68299673
- IUPHAR/BPS: 13743
- DrugBank: DB17697
- ChemSpider: 115277122
- UNII: K2US8HW4TQ
- ChEMBL: ChEMBL5314970

Chemical and physical data
- Formula: C_{25}H_{25}N_{3}O_{3}
- Molar mass: 415.493 g·mol^{−1}
- 3D model (JSmol): Interactive image
- SMILES: CCN1C(=O)COC2=C1C=C(C(=N2)C3=CC=C(C=C3)C4(CC(C4)O)N)C5=CC=CC=C5
- InChI: InChI=InChI=1S/C25H25N3O3/c1-2-28-21-12-20(16-6-4-3-5-7-16)23(27-24(21)31-15-22(28)30)17-8-10-18(11-9-17)25(26)13-19(29)14-25/h3-12,19,29H,2,13-15,26H2,1H3; Key:BPHCAPAOSHZYJY-UHFFFAOYSA-N

Engasertib is an investigational new drug that is being evaluated by Vaderis Therapeutics for the treatment of hereditary haemorrhagic telangiectasia. It acts as a c-akt protein inhibitor.
