= SH3RF1 =

Protein-coding gene in the species Homo sapiens

Identifiers
- Aliases: SH3RF1, POSH, RNF142, SH3MD2, SH3 domain containing ring finger 1
- External IDs: MGI: 1913066; GeneCards: SH3RF1
Enzyme activity
| EC # | BRENDA | ExPASy | KEGG | MetaCyc |
|---|---|---|---|---|
| 2.3.2.27 | ↗ | ↗ | ↗ | ↗ |

Gene location (Human)
| Chr. | Chromosome 4 (human) |
| Band | 4q32.3-q33 | Start | 169,094,259 bp |
| Band | 4q32.3-q33 | End | 169,270,956 bp |

Gene location (Mouse)
| Chr. | Chromosome 8 (mouse) |
| Band | 8|8 B3.1 | Start | 61,676,906 bp |
| Band | 8|8 B3.1 | End | 61,849,105 bp |
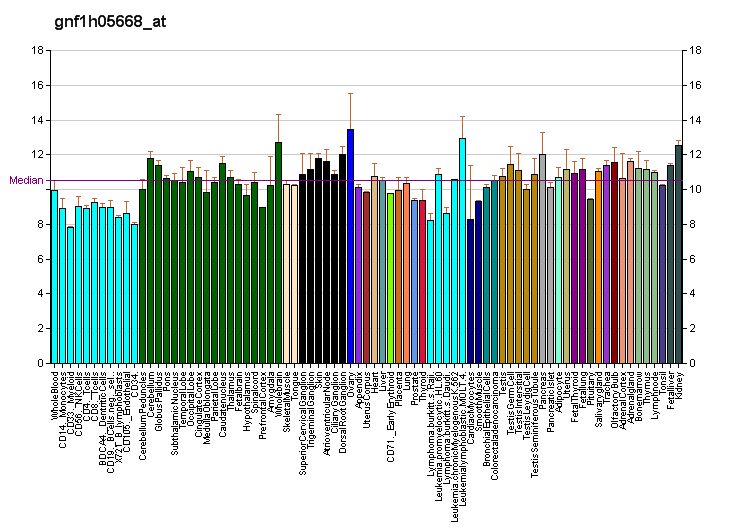
RNA expression pattern
| Bgee | Human / Mouse (ortholog); Top expressed in: pancreatic epithelial cell; mucosa of ileum; palpebral conjunctiva; pancreatic ductal cell; endothelial cell; germinal epithelium; ventricular zone; mucosa of colon; jejunal mucosa; mucosa of paranasal sinus / Top expressed in: efferent ductule; seminal vesicula; vestibular sensory epithelium; medial ganglionic eminence; primary oocyte; conjunctival fornix; vas deferens; secondary oocyte; retinal pigment epithelium; ciliary body; More reference expression data |
| BioGPS | More reference expression data |
Gene ontology
| Molecular function | protein binding; metal ion binding; transferase activity; MAP-kinase scaffold activity; ubiquitin protein ligase activity |
| Cellular component | cytoplasm; perinuclear region of cytoplasm; cytosol; Golgi apparatus; cell projection; lamellipodium |
| Biological process | negative regulation of extrinsic apoptotic signaling pathway; negative regulation of cysteine-type endopeptidase activity involved in apoptotic process; negative regulation of apoptotic process; regulation of JNK cascade; protein ubiquitination; apoptotic process; neuron migration; regulation of CD4-positive, alpha-beta T cell differentiation; protein autoubiquitination; regulation of CD8-positive, alpha-beta T cell proliferation; positive regulation of JNK cascade |
Sources:Amigo / QuickGO
Orthologs
| Databases | NCBI: entry; OMA: entry |
| Species | Human | Mouse |
| Entrez | 57630 | 59009 |
| Ensembl | ENSG00000154447 | ENSMUSG00000031642 |
| UniProt | Q7Z6J0 | Q69ZI1 |
| RefSeq (mRNA) | NM_020870 | NM_021506; NM_198678 |
| RefSeq (protein) | NP_065921 | NP_067481 |
| Location (UCSC) | Chr 4: 169.09 – 169.27 Mb | Chr 8: 61.68 – 61.85 Mb |
| PubMed search |
- Wikidata
| View/Edit Human | View/Edit Mouse |

Putative E3 ubiquitin-protein ligase SH3RF1 is an enzyme that in humans is encoded by the SH3RF1 gene.

== Function ==
This gene encodes a protein containing an N-terminus RING-finger, four SH3 domains, and a region implicated in binding of the Rho GTPase Rac. Via the RING-finger, the encoded protein has been shown to function as a ubiquitin-protein ligase involved in protein sorting at the trans-Golgi network. The encoded protein may also act as a scaffold for the c-Jun N-terminal kinase signaling pathway, facilitating the formation of a functional signaling module.

== Interactions ==
SH3RF1 has been shown to interact with AKT2 and MAP3K11.
