= AKT3 =

Protein-coding gene in humans

Identifiers
- Aliases: AKT3, MPPH, MPPH2, PKB-GAMMA, PKBG, PRKBG, RAC-PK-gamma, RAC-gamma, STK-2, AKT serine/threonine kinase 3
- External IDs: OMIM: 611223; MGI: 1345147; GeneCards: AKT3
Available structures
PDB	Ortholog search: PDBe RCSB
PDB	List of PDB id codes 2X18
Enzyme activity
EC #	BRENDA	ExPASy	KEGG	MetaCyc
2.7.11.1	↗	↗	↗	↗

Gene location (Human)
Chr.	Chromosome 1 (human)
Band	1q43-q44	Start	243,488,233 bp
Band	1q43-q44	End	243,851,079 bp

Gene location (Mouse)
Chr.	Chromosome 1 (mouse)
Band	1|1 H4	Start	176,847,639 bp
Band	1|1 H4	End	177,085,769 bp
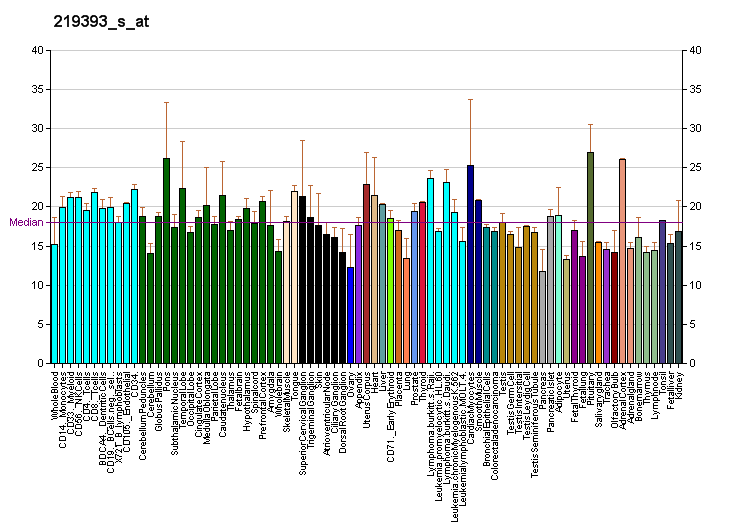

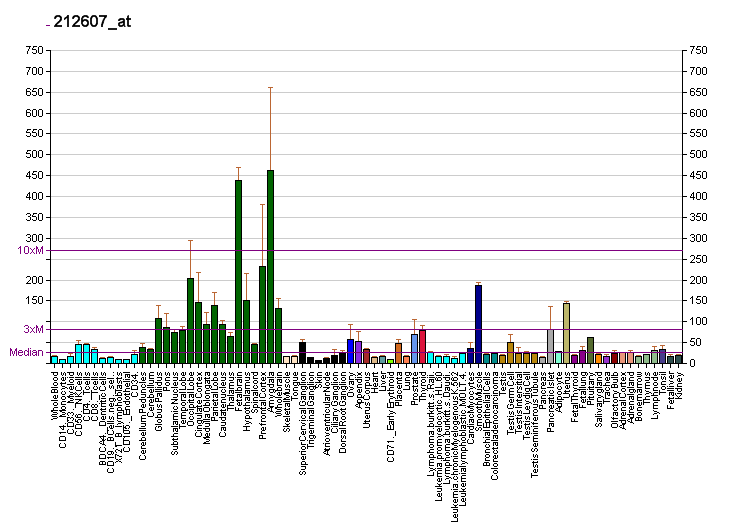

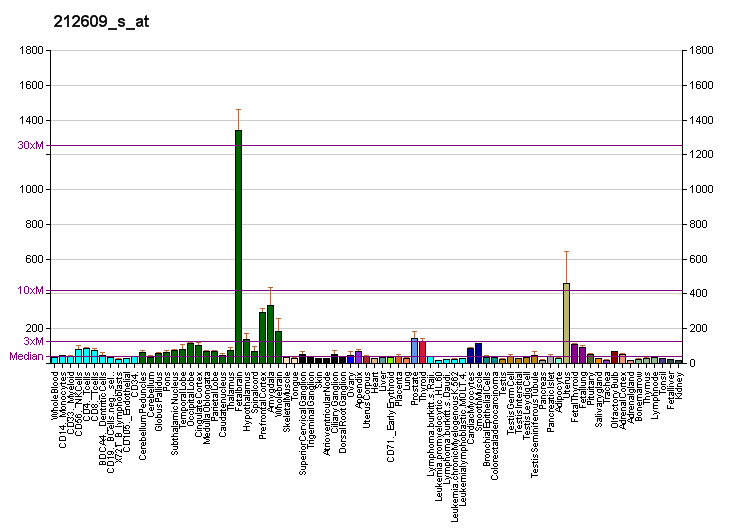
RNA expression pattern
Bgee	Human / Mouse (ortholog); Top expressed in: Achilles tendon; ganglionic eminence; epithelium of colon; ventricular zone; popliteal artery; tibial arteries; sural nerve; islet of Langerhans; smooth muscle tissue; right coronary artery / Top expressed in: zygote; tail of embryo; dentate gyrus of hippocampal formation granule cell; facial motor nucleus; secondary oocyte; ganglionic eminence; substantia nigra; ascending aorta; medial dorsal nucleus; subdivision of hippocampus; More reference expression data
BioGPS	More reference expression data
Gene ontology
Molecular function	transferase activity; protein kinase activity; nucleotide binding; protein serine/threonine kinase activity; protein binding; ATP binding; kinase activity
Cellular component	intracellular anatomical structure; membrane; nucleus; cytoplasm
Biological process	protein phosphorylation; intracellular signal transduction; peptidyl-serine phosphorylation; mitochondrial genome maintenance; signal transduction; phosphorylation; positive regulation of TOR signaling; positive regulation of cell size; brain morphogenesis; homeostasis of number of cells within a tissue; positive regulation of endothelial cell proliferation; positive regulation of blood vessel endothelial cell migration; positive regulation of angiogenesis; positive regulation of cell migration involved in sprouting angiogenesis; positive regulation of vascular endothelial cell proliferation; positive regulation of artery morphogenesis; negative regulation of cellular senescence
Sources:Amigo / QuickGO
Orthologs
Databases	NCBI: entry; OMA: entry
Species	Human	Mouse
Entrez	10000	23797
Ensembl	ENSG00000117020; ENSG00000275199	ENSMUSG00000019699
UniProt	Q9Y243	Q9WUA6
RefSeq (mRNA)	NM_001206729; NM_005465; NM_181690; NM_001370074	NM_011785
RefSeq (protein)	NP_001193658; NP_005456; NP_859029; NP_001357003	NP_035915
Location (UCSC)	Chr 1: 243.49 – 243.85 Mb	Chr 1: 176.85 – 177.09 Mb
PubMed search
- Wikidata
View/Edit Human	View/Edit Mouse

RAC-gamma serine/threonine-protein kinase is an enzyme that in humans is encoded by the AKT3 gene.

== Function ==
The protein encoded by this gene is a member of the AKT subfamily of serine/threonine protein kinases. AKT kinases are known to be regulators of cell signaling in response to insulin and growth factors. They are involved in a wide variety of biological processes including cell proliferation, differentiation, apoptosis, tumorigenesis, as well as glycogen synthesis and glucose uptake. This kinase has been shown to be stimulated by platelet-derived growth factor (PDGF), insulin, and insulin-like growth factor 1 (IGF1). Alternatively splice transcript variants encoding distinct isoforms have been described. Mice lacking Akt3 have a normal glucose metabolism (no diabetes), have approximately normal body weight, but have a 25% reduction in brain mass. Incidentally, Akt3 is highly expressed in the brain.

== Interactions ==
AKT3 has been shown to interact with Protein kinase Mζ.
