= Ipatasertib =

Chemical compound

Clinical data
- Routes of administration: PO
- ATC code: None

Identifiers
- IUPAC name: (S)-2-(4-Chlorophenyl)-1-(4-((5R,7R)-7-hydroxy-5-methyl-6,7-dihydro-5H-cyclopenta[d]pyrimidin-4-yl)piperazin-1-yl)-3-(isopropylamino)propan-1-one
- CAS Number: 1001264-89-6
- ChemSpider: 28189084
- UNII: 524Y3IB4HQ
- KEGG: D10641
- CompTox Dashboard (EPA): DTXSID101025595

Chemical and physical data
- Formula: C_{24}H_{32}ClN_{5}O_{2}
- Molar mass: 458.00 g·mol^{−1}
- 3D model (JSmol): Interactive image
- SMILES: CC(C)NC[C@@H](C(=O)N1CCN(CC1)C1=C2[C@H](C)C[C@@H](O)C2=NC=N1)C1=CC=C(Cl)C=C1
- InChI: InChI=1S/C24H32ClN5O2/c1-15(2)26-13-19(17-4-6-18(25)7-5-17)24(32)30-10-8-29(9-11-30)23-21-16(3)12-20(31)22(21)27-14-28-23/h4-7,14-16,19-20,26,31H,8-13H2,1-3H3/t16-,19-,20-/m1/s1; Key:GRZXWCHAXNAUHY-NSISKUIASA-N

Ipatasertib (RG7440) is an experimental cancer drug in development by Roche. It is a small molecule inhibitor of AKT, which is a key component of the PI3K/AKT pathway. Ipatasertib was discovered by Genentech in collaboration with Array Biopharma and is currently in phase III trials for treatment of breast cancer.

In vitro, ipatasertib showed activity against all three isoforms of Akt.
