= RAB21 =

Protein-coding gene in the species Homo sapiens

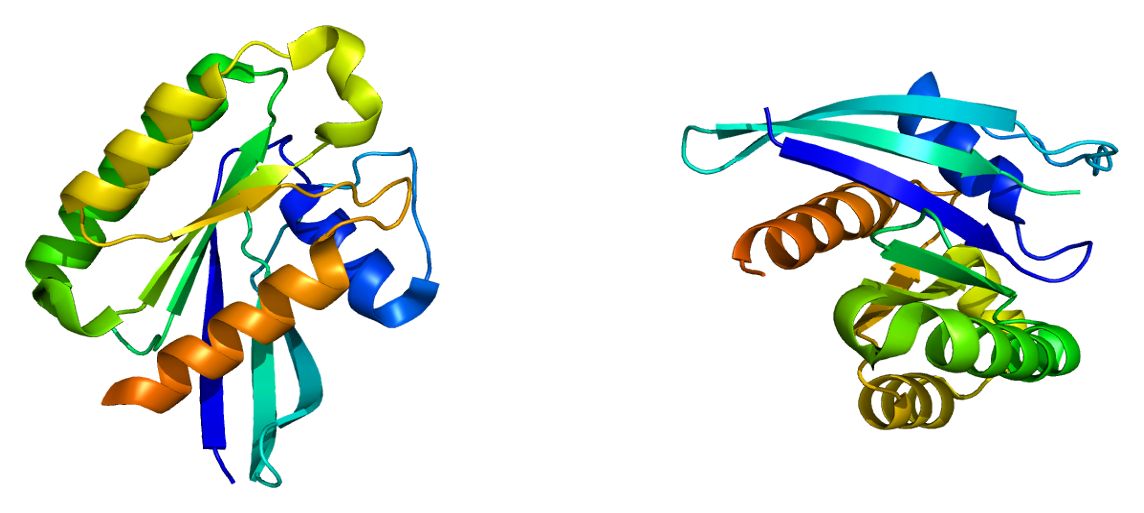

Identifiers
- Aliases: RAB21, member RAS oncogene family
- External IDs: OMIM: 612398; MGI: 894308; GeneCards: RAB21
Available structures
PDB	Ortholog search: PDBe RCSB
PDB	List of PDB id codes 1YZT, 1YZU, 1Z08, 1Z0I, 2OT3
Enzyme activity
EC #	BRENDA	ExPASy	KEGG	MetaCyc
3.6.5.2	↗	↗	↗	↗

Gene location (Human)
Chr.	Chromosome 12 (human)
Band	12q21.1	Start	71,754,863 bp
Band	12q21.1	End	71,800,286 bp

Gene location (Mouse)
Chr.	Chromosome 10 (mouse)
Band	10|10 D2	Start	115,122,989 bp
Band	10|10 D2	End	115,151,499 bp
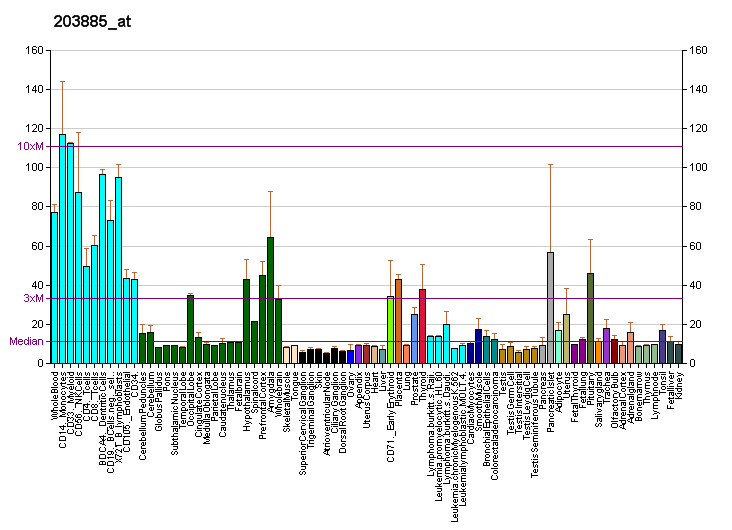

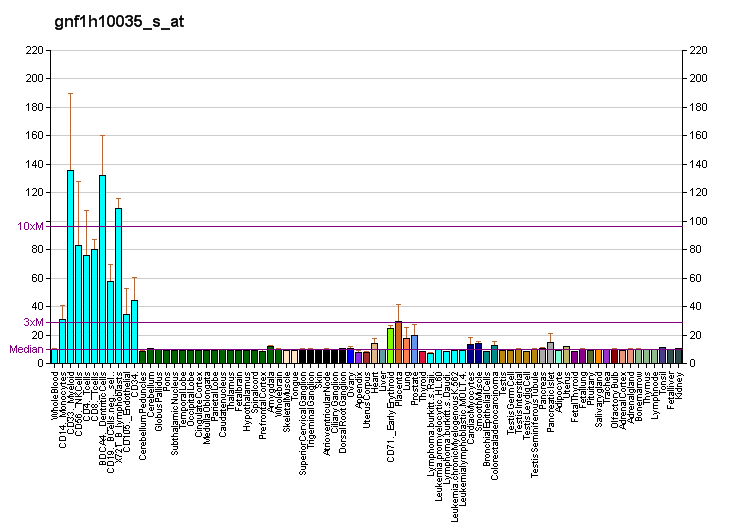
RNA expression pattern
Bgee	Human / Mouse (ortholog); Top expressed in: Skeletal muscle tissue of rectus abdominis; right ventricle; biceps brachii; gastrocnemius muscle; Skeletal muscle tissue of biceps brachii; Achilles tendon; amniotic fluid; glutes; popliteal artery; tibial arteries / Top expressed in: aortic valve; ascending aorta; supraoptic nucleus; decidua; dorsomedial hypothalamic nucleus; primary oocyte; gastrula; granulocyte; endothelial cell of lymphatic vessel; mammillary body; More reference expression data
BioGPS	More reference expression data
Gene ontology
Molecular function	nucleotide binding; GDP binding; GTP binding; protein binding; GTPase activity
Cellular component	endosome; Golgi apparatus; endoplasmic reticulum membrane; membrane; focal adhesion; vesicle membrane; Golgi membrane; Golgi cisterna membrane; trans-Golgi network; endoplasmic reticulum; neuron projection; cytoplasmic side of plasma membrane; cytoplasmic side of early endosome membrane; cleavage furrow; extracellular exosome; cytoplasmic vesicle membrane; cytoplasmic vesicle; axon cytoplasm; cytosol; early endosome membrane; early endosome; synapse
Biological process	positive regulation of receptor-mediated endocytosis; regulation of axon extension; anterograde axonal transport; regulation of exocytosis; positive regulation of dendrite morphogenesis; protein transport; positive regulation of early endosome to late endosome transport; transport; intracellular protein transport; Rab protein signal transduction; signal transduction
Sources:Amigo / QuickGO
Orthologs
Databases	NCBI: entry; OMA: entry
Species	Human	Mouse
Entrez	23011	216344
Ensembl	ENSG00000080371	ENSMUSG00000020132
UniProt	Q9UL25	P35282
RefSeq (mRNA)	NM_014999	NM_024454
RefSeq (protein)	NP_055814	NP_077774
Location (UCSC)	Chr 12: 71.75 – 71.8 Mb	Chr 10: 115.12 – 115.15 Mb
PubMed search
- Wikidata
View/Edit Human	View/Edit Mouse

Ras-related protein Rab-21 is a protein that in humans is encoded by the RAB21 gene.
