= TNK2 =

Protein-coding gene in the species Homo sapiens

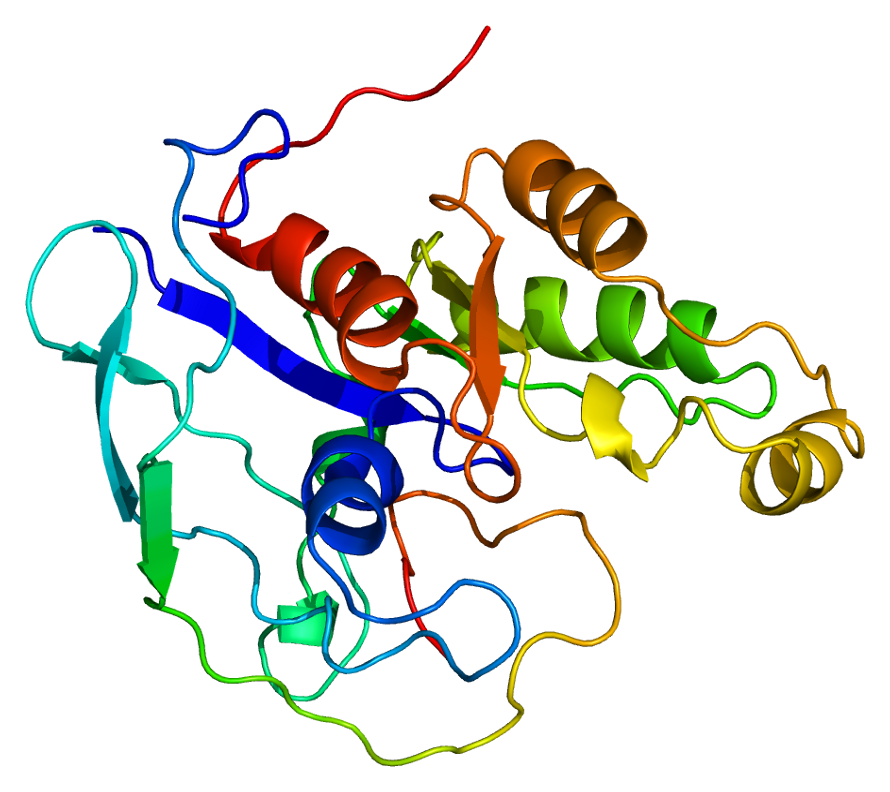

Identifiers
- Aliases: TNK2, ACK, ACK-1, ACK1, p21cdc42Hs, tyrosine kinase non receptor 2
- External IDs: OMIM: 606994; MGI: 1858308; GeneCards: TNK2
Available structures
PDB	Ortholog search: PDBe RCSB
PDB	List of PDB id codes 1CF4, 1U46, 1U4D, 1U54, 3EQP, 3EQR, 4EWH, 4HZR, 4HZS, 4ID7
Enzyme activity
EC #	BRENDA	ExPASy	KEGG	MetaCyc
2.7.10.2	↗	↗	↗	↗
2.7.11.1	↗	↗	↗	↗

Gene location (Human)
Chr.	Chromosome 3 (human)
Band	3q29	Start	195,863,364 bp
Band	3q29	End	195,911,945 bp

Gene location (Mouse)
Chr.	Chromosome 16 (mouse)
Band	16|16 B3	Start	32,462,692 bp
Band	16|16 B3	End	32,502,311 bp
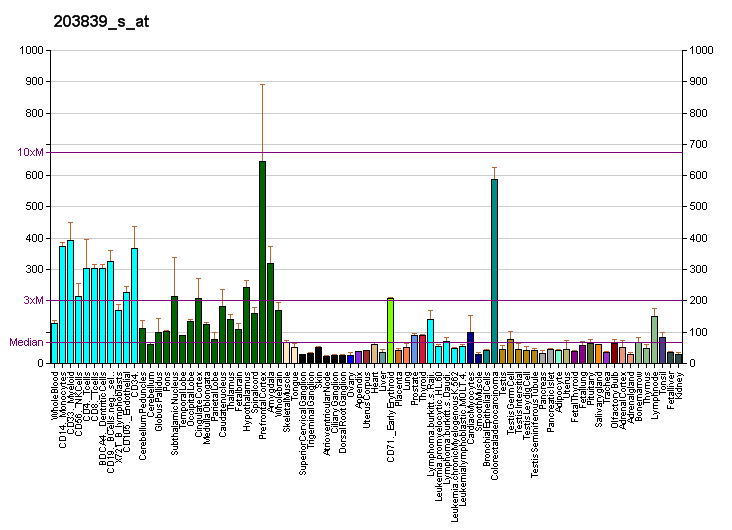

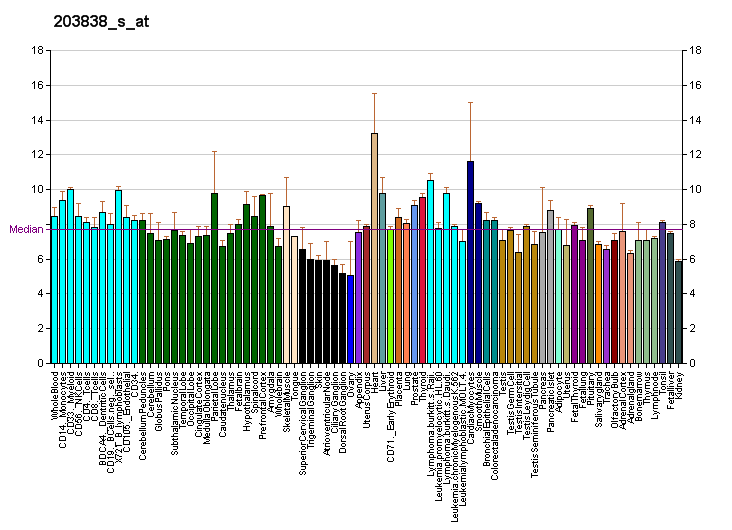
RNA expression pattern
Bgee	Human / Mouse (ortholog); Top expressed in: right hemisphere of cerebellum; right frontal lobe; cingulate gyrus; anterior cingulate cortex; amygdala; granulocyte; nucleus accumbens; anterior pituitary; Brodmann area 9; putamen / Top expressed in: medial vestibular nucleus; substantia nigra; lateral hypothalamus; paraventricular nucleus of hypothalamus; dorsal tegmental nucleus; neural layer of retina; deep cerebellar nuclei; pontine nuclei; dentate gyrus of hippocampal formation granule cell; motor neuron; More reference expression data
BioGPS	More reference expression data
Gene ontology
Molecular function	transferase activity; nucleotide binding; protein kinase activity; epidermal growth factor receptor binding; GTPase inhibitor activity; metal ion binding; kinase activity; protein serine/threonine kinase activity; protein binding; identical protein binding; WW domain binding; protein tyrosine kinase activity; ATP binding; ubiquitin protein ligase binding; non-membrane spanning protein tyrosine kinase activity; protein serine/threonine/tyrosine kinase activity
Cellular component	endosome; membrane; extrinsic component of cytoplasmic side of plasma membrane; adherens junction; plasma membrane; cell junction; Grb2-EGFR complex; clathrin-coated pit; cytoplasmic vesicle membrane; cytoplasmic vesicle; nucleus; clathrin-coated vesicle; cytoplasm; perinuclear region of cytoplasm; cytoophidium
Biological process	cell differentiation; endocytosis; phosphorylation; transmembrane receptor protein tyrosine kinase signaling pathway; small GTPase mediated signal transduction; protein phosphorylation; cell surface receptor signaling pathway; regulation of cell population proliferation; positive regulation of peptidyl-tyrosine phosphorylation; peptidyl-tyrosine autophosphorylation; regulation of clathrin-dependent endocytosis; innate immune response; cell migration; negative regulation of GTPase activity; signal transduction
Sources:Amigo / QuickGO
Orthologs
Databases	NCBI: entry; OMA: entry
Species	Human	Mouse
Entrez	10188	51789
Ensembl	ENSG00000061938	ENSMUSG00000022791
UniProt	Q07912	O54967
RefSeq (mRNA)	NM_001010938; NM_001308046; NM_005781; NM_001382271; NM_001382272 NM_001382273; NM_001382274; NM_001382275	NM_001110147; NM_001289443; NM_016788; NM_001347185
RefSeq (protein)	NP_001010938; NP_001294975; NP_005772	NP_001103617; NP_001276372; NP_001334114; NP_058068
Location (UCSC)	Chr 3: 195.86 – 195.91 Mb	Chr 16: 32.46 – 32.5 Mb
PubMed search
- Wikidata
View/Edit Human	View/Edit Mouse

Activated CDC42 kinase 1, also known as ACK1, is an enzyme that in humans is encoded by the TNK2 gene. TNK2 gene encodes a non-receptor tyrosine kinase, ACK1, that binds to multiple receptor tyrosine kinases e.g. EGFR, MERTK, AXL, HER2 and insulin receptor (IR). ACK1 also interacts with Cdc42Hs in its GTP-bound form and inhibits both the intrinsic and GTPase-activating protein (GAP)-stimulated GTPase activity of Cdc42Hs. This binding is mediated by a unique sequence of 47 amino acids C-terminal to an SH3 domain. The protein may be involved in a regulatory mechanism that sustains the GTP-bound active form of Cdc42Hs and which is directly linked to a tyrosine phosphorylation signal transduction pathway. Several alternatively spliced transcript variants have been identified from this gene, but the full-length nature of only two transcript variants has been determined.

== Interactions ==
ACK1 or TNK2 has been shown to interact with AKT, Androgen receptor or AR, a tumor suppressor WWOX, FYN and Grb2. ACK1 interaction with its substrates resulted in their phosphorylation at specific tyrosine residues. ACK1 has been shown to directly phosphorylate AKT at tyrosine 176, AR at Tyrosine 267 and 363, and WWOX at tyrosine 287 residues, respectively. ACK1-AR signaling has also been reported to regulate ATM levels,

== Clinical relevance ==
ACK1 is a survival kinase and shown to be associated with tumor cell survival, proliferation, hormone-resistance and radiation resistance. The activation of ACK1 has been observed in prostate, breast, pancreatic, lung and ovarian cancer cells. ACK1 transgenic mice, expressing activated ACK1 specifically in prostate gland has been reported; these mice develop prostatic intraepithelial neoplasia (PINs).

== ACK1 inhibitors ==
Ack1 has emerged as a new cancer target and multiple small molecule inhibitors have been reported. All of these inhibitors are currently in the pre-clinical stage.

Mahajan, K., Malla, P., Lawrence, H. R., Chen, Z., Kumar-Sinha, C., Malik, R., … Mahajan, N. P. (2017). ACK1/TNK2 Regulates Histone H4 Tyr88-phosphorylation and AR Gene Expression in Castration-Resistant Prostate Cancer. Cancer Cell, 31(6), 790-803.e8. https://doi.org/10.1016/j.ccell.2017.05.003

‌
