= Rizavasertib =

Investigational drug

Clinical data
- Other names: A-443654

Identifiers
- IUPAC name: (2S)-1-(1H-indol-3-yl)-3-[[5-(3-methyl-2H-indazol-5-yl)-3-pyridinyl]oxy]propan-2-amine
- CAS Number: 552325-16-3
- PubChem CID: 10172943
- IUPHAR/BPS: 8204
- DrugBank: DB08073
- ChemSpider: 8348448
- UNII: Q4UG565ZYH
- ChEBI: CHEBI:91351
- ChEMBL: ChEMBL379300
- PDB ligand: L20 (PDBe, RCSB PDB)
- CompTox Dashboard (EPA): DTXSID20436347

Chemical and physical data
- Formula: C_{24}H_{23}N_{5}O
- Molar mass: 397.482 g·mol^{−1}
- 3D model (JSmol): Interactive image
- SMILES: CC1=C2C=C(C=CC2=NN1)C3=CC(=CN=C3)OC[C@H](CC4=CNC5=CC=CC=C54)N
- InChI: InChI=InChI=1S/C24H23N5O/c1-15-22-10-16(6-7-24(22)29-28-15)17-9-20(13-26-11-17)30-14-19(25)8-18-12-27-23-5-3-2-4-21(18)23/h2-7,9-13,19,27H,8,14,25H2,1H3,(H,28,29)/t19-/m0/s1; Key:YWTBGJGMTBHQTM-IBGZPJMESA-N

Rizavasertib was a drug candidate originally developed by Abbott (now AbbVie). It is a pan akt Inhibitor. It is now used as an akt inhibitor tool compound.
