= TFEB =

Protein-coding gene in the species Homo sapiens

Identifiers
- Aliases: TFEB, ALPHABHLHE35, TCFEB, transcription factor EB
- External IDs: OMIM: 600744; MGI: 103270; GeneCards: TFEB

Gene location (Human)
Chr.	Chromosome 6 (human)
Band	6p21.1	Start	41,683,978 bp
Band	6p21.1	End	41,736,259 bp

Gene location (Mouse)
Chr.	Chromosome 17 (mouse)
Band	17 C|17 23.99 cM	Start	48,047,955 bp
Band	17 C|17 23.99 cM	End	48,103,344 bp
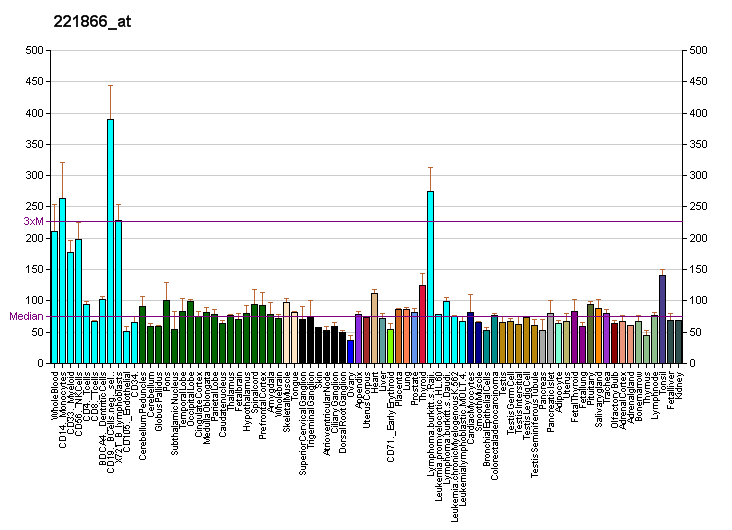

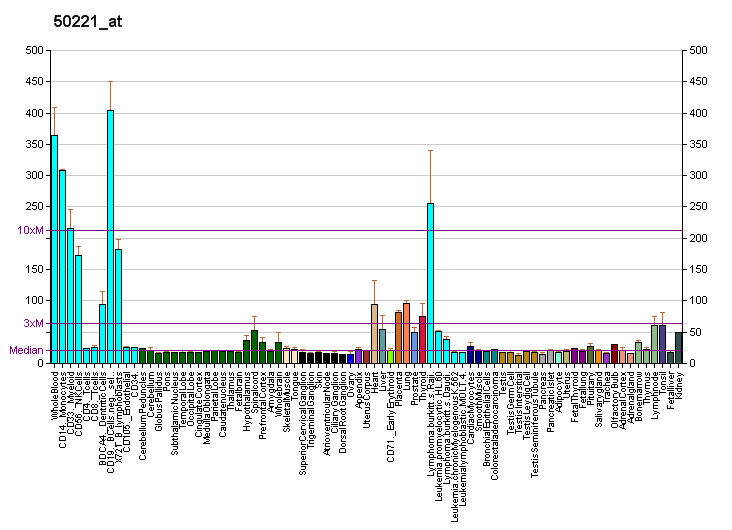
RNA expression pattern
Bgee	Human / Mouse (ortholog); Top expressed in: muscle of thigh; gastrocnemius muscle; apex of heart; granulocyte; blood; C1 segment; inferior olivary nucleus; spleen; inferior ganglion of vagus nerve; monocyte / Top expressed in: muscle of thigh; granulocyte; esophagus; triceps brachii muscle; temporal muscle; vastus lateralis muscle; ankle; iris; ciliary body; gastrocnemius muscle; More reference expression data
BioGPS	More reference expression data
Gene ontology
Molecular function	DNA binding; protein dimerization activity; DNA-binding transcription factor activity; DNA-binding transcription factor activity, RNA polymerase II-specific
Cellular component	cytoplasm; nucleus
Biological process	autophagy; positive regulation of transcription, DNA-templated; embryonic placenta development; lysosome organization; adaptive immune response; transcription, DNA-templated; positive regulation of autophagy; positive regulation of transcription by RNA polymerase II; immune system process; humoral immune response; regulation of transcription, DNA-templated; lysosome localization
Sources:Amigo / QuickGO
Orthologs
Databases	NCBI: entry; OMA: entry
Species	Human	Mouse
Entrez	7942	21425
Ensembl	ENSG00000112561	ENSMUSG00000023990
UniProt	P19484	Q9R210
RefSeq (mRNA)	NM_001167827; NM_001271943; NM_001271944; NM_001271945; NM_007162	NM_001161722; NM_001161723; NM_011549
RefSeq (protein)	NP_001161299; NP_001258872; NP_001258873; NP_001258874; NP_009093	NP_001155194; NP_001155195; NP_035679
Location (UCSC)	Chr 6: 41.68 – 41.74 Mb	Chr 17: 48.05 – 48.1 Mb
PubMed search
- Wikidata
View/Edit Human	View/Edit Mouse

Transcription factor EB is a protein that in humans is encoded by the TFEB gene.

== Function ==
TFEB is a master gene for lysosomal biogenesis. It encodes a transcription factor that coordinates expression of lysosomal hydrolases, membrane proteins and genes involved in autophagy. Upon nutrient depletion and under aberrant lysosomal storage conditions such as in lysosomal storage diseases, TFEB translocates from the cytoplasm to the nucleus, resulting in the activation of its target genes. TFEB overexpression in cultured cells induces lysosomal biogenesis, exocytosis and autophagy.

In bacterial infection nicotinic acid adenine dinucleotide phosphate (NAADP) induction of lysosomal Ca^{2+} efflux and TFEB activation leads to enhanced expression of inflammatory cytokines. Viral-mediated TFEB overexpression in cellular and mouse models of lysosomal storage disorders and in common neurodegenerative diseases such as Huntington's, Parkinson's, and Alzheimer's diseases, resulted in intracellular clearance of accumulating molecules and rescue of disease phenotypes. TFEB is activated by PGC1-alpha and promotes reduction of htt aggregation and neurotoxicity in a mouse model of Huntington's disease.

TFEB overexpression has been found in patients with renal cell carcinoma and pancreatic cancer and was shown to promote tumorogenesis via induction of various oncogenic signals.

TFEB constitutive activation, due to FLCN mutations, drives renal cystogenesis and tumorigenesis in Birt–Hogg–Dubé syndrome.

Nuclear localization and activity of TFEB is inhibited by serine phosphorylation by mTORC1 and extracellular signal–regulated kinase 2 (ERK2).

mTORC1 phosphorylation of TFEB occurs at the lysosomal surface, both of which are localized there by interaction with the Rag GTPases. Phosphorylated TFEB is then retained in the cytosol by interaction with 14-3-3 proteins. These kinases are tuned to the levels of extracellular nutrients suggesting a coordination in regulation of autophagy and lysosomal biogenesis and partnership of two distinct cellular organelles. Nutrient depletion induces TFEB dephosphorylation and subsequent nuclear translocation via the phosphatase calcineurin.

TFEB nuclear export is mediated by CRM1 and is dependent on phosphorylation.

TFEB is also a target of the protein kinase AKT/PKB. AKT/PKB phosphorylates TFEB at serine 467 and inhibits TFEB nuclear translocation. Pharmacological inhibition of AKT/PKB activates TFEB, promotes lysosome biogenesis and autophagy, and ameliorates neuropathology in mouse models of Juvenile Batten disease and Sanfilippo syndrome type B.

TFEB is activated in Trex1-deficient cells via inhibition of mTORC1 activity, resulting in an expanded lysosomal compartment.
