= Phosphatidylinositol (3,4,5)-trisphosphate =

Names
- Other names PI(3,4,5)P_{3}, PtdIns(3,4,5)P_{3}

Identifiers
ChEBI	CHEBI:16618
KEGG	C05981

Properties
Chemical formula	C_{47}H_{86}O_{22}P_{4}
Molar mass	1126.46 g/mol, neutral with fatty acid composition - 18:0, 20:4
- Except where otherwise noted, data are given for materials in their standard state (at 25 °C [77 °F], 100 kPa). verify (what is ?) Infobox references

Phosphatidylinositol (3,4,5)-trisphosphate (PtdIns(3,4,5)P_{3}), abbreviated PIP_{3}, is the product of the class I phosphoinositide 3-kinases' (PI 3-kinases) phosphorylation of phosphatidylinositol (4,5)-bisphosphate (PIP_{2}). It is a phospholipid that resides on the plasma membrane.

== Discovery ==
In 1988, Lewis C. Cantley published a paper describing the discovery of a novel type of phosphoinositide kinase with the unprecedented ability to phosphorylate the 3' position of the inositol ring resulting in the formation of phosphatidylinositol-3-phosphate (PI3P). Working independently, Alexis Traynor-Kaplan and coworkers published a paper demonstrating that a novel lipid, phosphatidylinositol 3,4,5 trisphosphate (PIP3) occurs naturally in human neutrophils with levels that increased rapidly following physiologic stimulation with chemotactic peptide. Subsequent studies demonstrated that in vivo the enzyme originally identified by Cantley's group prefers PtdIns(4,5)P2 as a substrate, producing the product PIP3.

== Function ==
PIP_{3} functions to activate downstream signaling components, the most notable one being the protein kinase Akt, which activates downstream anabolic signaling pathways required for cell growth and survival.

PtdIns(3,4,5)P_{3} is dephosphorylated by the phosphatase PTEN on the 3 position, generating PI(4,5)P_{2}, and by SHIPs (SH2-containing inositol phosphatase) on the 5' position of the inositol ring, producing PI(3,4)P_{2}.

The PH domain in a number of proteins binds to PtdIns(3,4,5)P_{3}. Such proteins include Akt/PKB, PDPK1, Btk1, and ARNO.

== Roles in the nervous system ==
PIP3 plays a critical role outside the cytosol, notably at the postsynaptic terminal of hippocampal cells. Here, PIP3 has been implicated in regulating synaptic strengthening and AMPA expression, contributing to long-term potentiation. Moreover, PIP3 suppression disrupts normal AMPA expression on the neuron membrane and instead leads to the accumulation of AMPA on dendritic spines, commonly associated with synaptic depression.

PIP3 interacts with proteins to mediate synaptic plasticity. Of these proteins, Phldb2 has been shown to interact with PIP3 to induce and maintain long-term potentiation. In the absence of such an interaction, memory consolidation is impaired.
