= AKT2 =

Protein found in humans

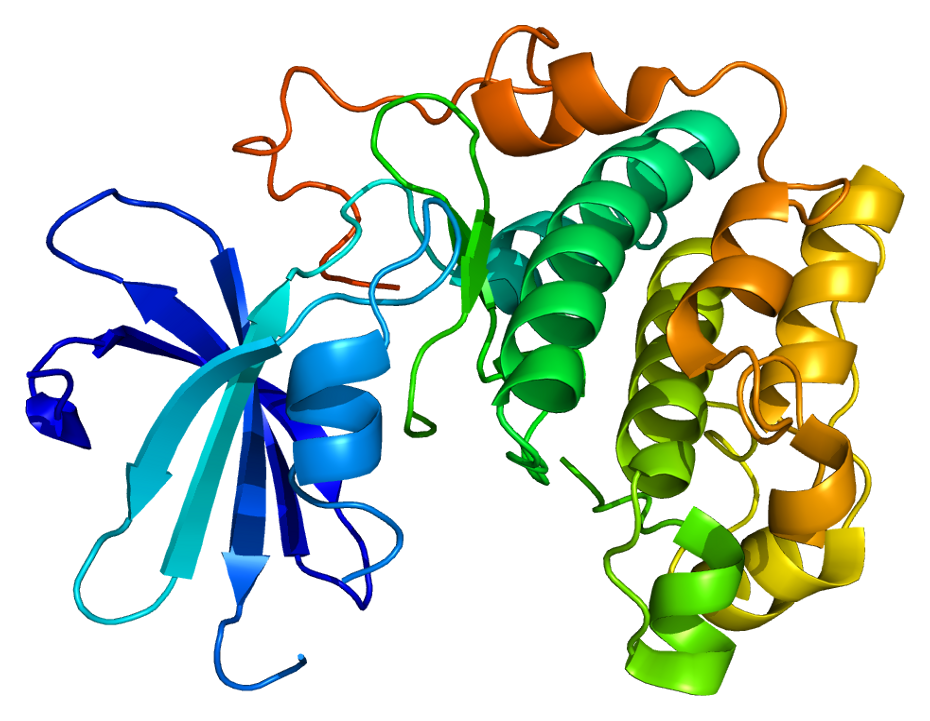

Identifiers
- Aliases: AKT2, v-akt murine thymoma viral oncogene homolog 2, HIHGHH, PKBB, PKBBETA, PRKBB, RAC-BETA, AKT serine/threonine kinase 2
- External IDs: OMIM: 164731; MGI: 104874; GeneCards: AKT2
Available structures
PDB	Ortholog search: PDBe RCSB
PDB	List of PDB id codes 1GZK, 1GZN, 1GZO, 1MRV, 1MRY, 1O6K, 1O6L, 1P6S, 2JDO, 2JDR, 2UW9, 2X39, 2XH5, 3D0E, 3E87, 3E88, 3E8D
Enzyme activity
EC #	BRENDA	ExPASy	KEGG	MetaCyc
2.7.11.1	↗	↗	↗	↗

Gene location (Human)
Chr.	Chromosome 19 (human)
Band	19q13.2	Start	40,230,317 bp
Band	19q13.2	End	40,285,536 bp

Gene location (Mouse)
Chr.	Chromosome 7 (mouse)
Band	7 A3|7 15.94 cM	Start	27,290,977 bp
Band	7 A3|7 15.94 cM	End	27,340,251 bp
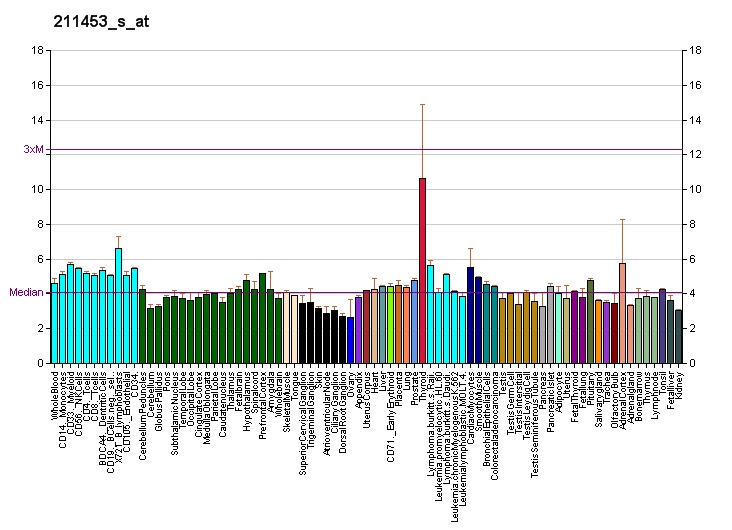

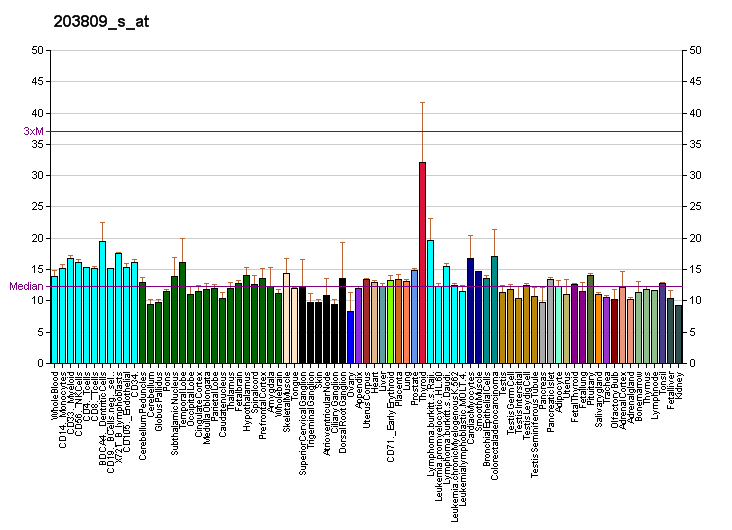
RNA expression pattern
Bgee	Human / Mouse (ortholog); Top expressed in: right uterine tube; right hemisphere of cerebellum; right lobe of thyroid gland; left lobe of thyroid gland; left ovary; right ovary; body of uterus; muscle of thigh; canal of the cervix; gastrocnemius muscle / Top expressed in: muscle of thigh; choroid plexus of fourth ventricle; genital tubercle; lip; granulocyte; ascending aorta; aortic valve; tail of embryo; lactiferous gland; yolk sac; More reference expression data
BioGPS	More reference expression data
Gene ontology
Molecular function	transferase activity; nucleotide binding; protein kinase activity; kinase activity; protein serine/threonine kinase activity; protein binding; ATP binding; metal ion binding
Cellular component	cytoplasm; endosome; membrane; plasma membrane; nucleoplasm; ruffle membrane; cell cortex; early endosome; nucleus; cytosol; intracellular membrane-bounded organelle; protein-containing complex; intracellular anatomical structure
Biological process	positive regulation of protein targeting to membrane; apoptotic process; positive regulation of fatty acid beta-oxidation; insulin receptor signaling pathway; positive regulation of protein phosphorylation; intracellular signal transduction; regulation of cell migration; peripheral nervous system myelin maintenance; positive regulation of glycogen biosynthetic process; positive regulation of cell motility; intracellular protein transmembrane transport; activation of GTPase activity; phosphorylation; positive regulation of glucose metabolic process; mammary gland epithelial cell differentiation; multicellular organism development; protein phosphorylation; negative regulation of long-chain fatty acid import across plasma membrane; glycogen biosynthetic process; positive regulation of vesicle fusion; peptidyl-serine phosphorylation; glucose metabolic process; cellular response to insulin stimulus; glycogen metabolic process; protein localization to plasma membrane; regulation of translation; fat cell differentiation; signal transduction; carbohydrate transport; positive regulation of cell migration; positive regulation of glucose import; cellular response to high light intensity; retinal rod cell apoptotic process; positive regulation of cell population proliferation; positive regulation of mitochondrial membrane potential; negative regulation of apoptotic process; carbohydrate metabolic process; protein kinase B signaling
Sources:Amigo / QuickGO
Orthologs
Databases	NCBI: entry; OMA: entry
Species	Human	Mouse
Entrez	208	11652
Ensembl	ENSG00000105221	ENSMUSG00000004056
UniProt	P31751	Q60823
RefSeq (mRNA)	NM_001243027; NM_001243028; NM_001626; NM_001330511	NM_001110208; NM_007434; NM_001331108; NM_001331109
RefSeq (protein)	NP_001229956; NP_001229957; NP_001317440; NP_001617	NP_001103678; NP_001318037; NP_001318038; NP_031460
Location (UCSC)	Chr 19: 40.23 – 40.29 Mb	Chr 7: 27.29 – 27.34 Mb
PubMed search
- Wikidata
View/Edit Human	View/Edit Mouse

AKT2, also known as RAC-beta serine/threonine-protein kinase, is an enzyme that in humans is encoded by the AKT2 gene. It influences metabolite storage as part of the insulin signal transduction pathway.

== Function ==
AKT2 is an important signaling molecule in the insulin signaling pathway. It is required to induce glucose transport. In a mouse which is null for AKT1 but normal for AKT2, glucose homeostasis is unperturbed, but the animals are smaller, consistent with a role for AKT1 in growth. In contrast, mice which do not have AKT2, but have normal AKT1, have mild growth deficiency and display a diabetic phenotype (insulin resistance), again consistent with the idea that AKT2 is more specific for the insulin receptor signaling pathway. AKT2 promotes cell migration as well.

This gene is a putative oncogene encoding a protein belonging to the AKT subfamily of serine/threonine kinases that contain SH2-like (Src homology 2-like) domains. The encoded protein is a general protein kinase capable of phosphorylating several known proteins.

AKT2 has important roles in controlling glycogenesis, gluconeogenesis, and glucose transport as part of the insulin signal transduction pathway.

== Clinical significance ==
The gene was shown to be amplified and overexpressed in 2 of 8 ovarian carcinoma cell lines and 2 of 15 primary ovarian tumors. Overexpression contributes to the malignant phenotype of a subset of human ductal pancreatic cancers.

Mice lacking Akt2 have a normal body mass, but display a profound diabetic phenotype, indicating that Akt2 plays a key role in signal transduction downstream of the insulin receptor. Mice lacking Akt2 show worse outcome in breast cancer initiated by the large T antigen as well as the neu oncogene.

== Interactions ==
AKT2 has been shown to interact with:

- APPL1,
- SH3RF1 and
- TCL1A.
