= Phosphoinositide-dependent kinase-1 =

Protein-coding gene in the species Homo sapiens

PDPK1
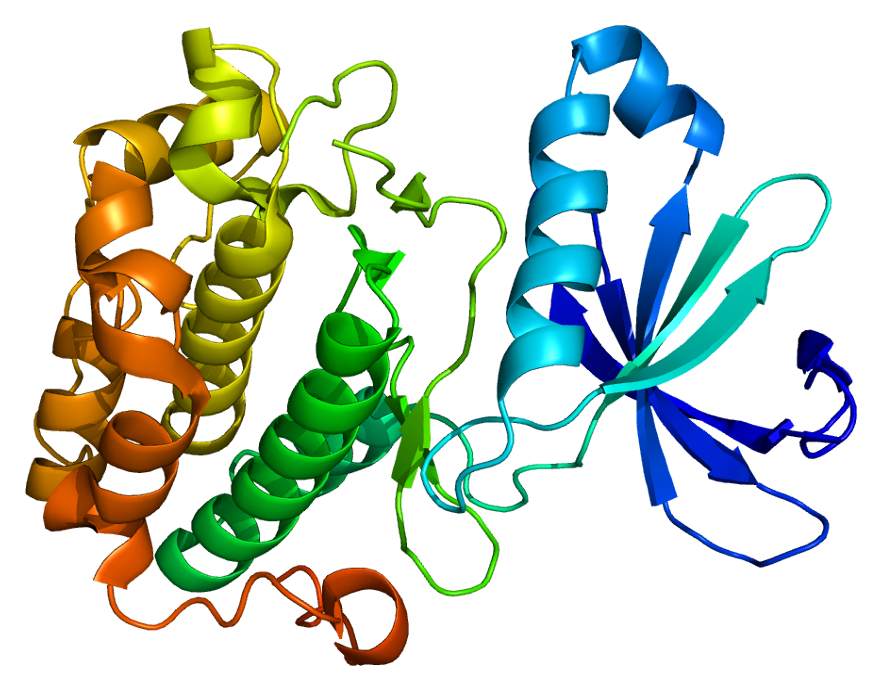

Identifiers
- Aliases: PDPK1, PDK1, PDPK2, PRO0461, PDPK2P, Phosphoinositide-dependent kinase-1, 3-phosphoinositide dependent protein kinase 1
- External IDs: OMIM: 605213; MGI: 1338068; GeneCards: PDPK1
Available structures
PDB	Ortholog search: PDBe RCSB
PDB	List of PDB id codes 1H1W, 1OKY, 1OKZ, 1UU3, 1UU7, 1UU8, 1UU9, 1UVR, 1W1D, 1W1G, 1W1H, 1Z5M, 2BIY, 2PE0, 2PE1, 2PE2, 2R7B, 2VKI, 2XCH, 2XCK, 3H9O, 3HRC, 3HRF, 3ION, 3IOP, 3NAX, 3NAY, 3NUN, 3NUS, 3NUU, 3NUY, 3ORX, 3ORZ, 3OTU, 3PWY, 3QC4, 3QCQ, 3QCS, 3QCX, 3QCY, 3QD0, 3QD3, 3QD4, 3RCJ, 3RWP, 3RWQ, 3SC1, 4A06, 4A07, 4AW0, 4AW1, 4CT1, 4CT2, 4RQV, 4RRV, 4XX9, 5ACK, 5HO7, 5HO8, 5HKM, 5HNG
Enzyme activity
EC #	BRENDA	ExPASy	KEGG	MetaCyc
2.7.11.1	↗	↗	↗	↗

Gene location (Human)
Chr.	Chromosome 16 (human)
Band	16p13.3	Start	2,537,979 bp
Band	16p13.3	End	2,603,188 bp

Gene location (Mouse)
Chr.	Chromosome 17 (mouse)
Band	17|17 A3.3	Start	24,292,654 bp
Band	17|17 A3.3	End	24,369,898 bp
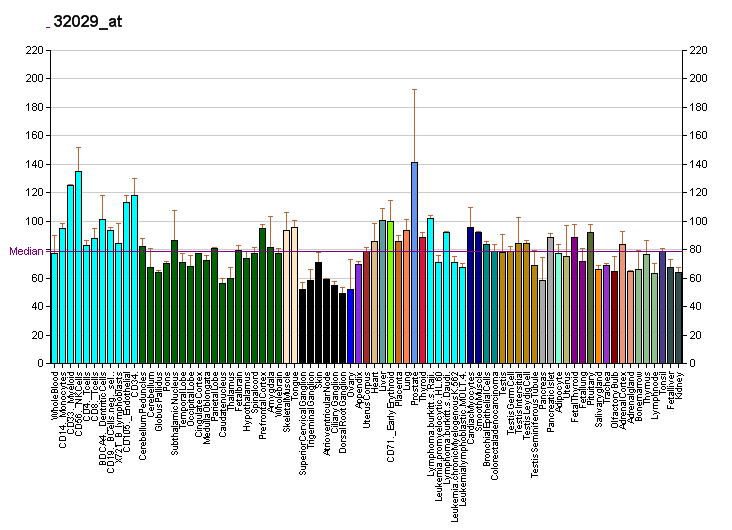

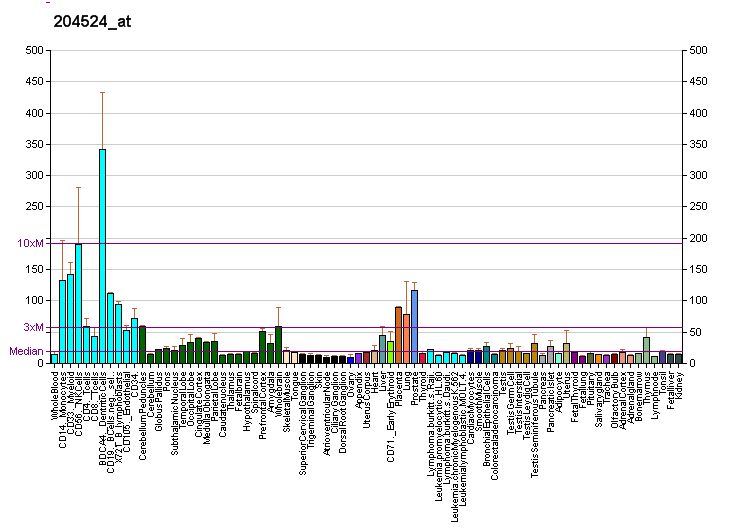
RNA expression pattern
Bgee	Human / Mouse (ortholog); Top expressed in: secondary oocyte; middle temporal gyrus; Brodmann area 23; bronchial epithelial cell; parotid gland; caput epididymis; corpus epididymis; mucosa of sigmoid colon; external globus pallidus; visceral pleura / Top expressed in: Rostral migratory stream; nucleus accumbens; seminiferous tubule; ventromedial nucleus; zygote; pontine nuclei; olfactory tubercle; anterior amygdaloid area; facial motor nucleus; epithelium of stomach; More reference expression data
BioGPS	More reference expression data
Gene ontology
Molecular function	transferase activity; nucleotide binding; protein kinase activity; phospholipase binding; insulin receptor binding; 3-phosphoinositide-dependent protein kinase activity; protein serine/threonine kinase activity; phospholipase activator activity; protein binding; ATP binding; protein kinase binding; kinase activity
Cellular component	cytoplasm; cytosol; cell projection; membrane; focal adhesion; plasma membrane; nucleoplasm; cell junction; nucleus; perikaryon; postsynaptic density; cytoplasmic vesicle
Biological process	intracellular signal transduction; regulation of transcription, DNA-templated; extrinsic apoptotic signaling pathway; negative regulation of protein kinase activity; phosphorylation; T cell costimulation; stimulatory C-type lectin receptor signaling pathway; positive regulation of release of sequestered calcium ion into cytosol; negative regulation of transforming growth factor beta receptor signaling pathway; hyperosmotic response; transcription, DNA-templated; platelet activation; cellular response to epidermal growth factor stimulus; Fc-epsilon receptor signaling pathway; positive regulation of phospholipase activity; protein phosphorylation; negative regulation of cardiac muscle cell apoptotic process; focal adhesion assembly; negative regulation of toll-like receptor signaling pathway; peptidyl-serine phosphorylation; regulation of endothelial cell migration; cellular response to insulin stimulus; protein autophosphorylation; regulation of mast cell degranulation; peptidyl-threonine phosphorylation; type B pancreatic cell development; T cell receptor signaling pathway; cell migration; actin cytoskeleton organization; regulation of I-kappaB kinase/NF-kappaB signaling; calcium-mediated signaling; negative regulation of neuron apoptotic process; cellular response to brain-derived neurotrophic factor stimulus; epidermal growth factor receptor signaling pathway; positive regulation of protein localization to plasma membrane; activation of protein kinase B activity; positive regulation of blood vessel endothelial cell migration; positive regulation of angiogenesis; positive regulation of vascular endothelial cell proliferation; positive regulation of sprouting angiogenesis; negative regulation of endothelial cell apoptotic process
Sources:Amigo / QuickGO
Orthologs
Databases	NCBI: entry; OMA: entry
Species	Human	Mouse
Entrez	5170	18607
Ensembl	ENSG00000140992	ENSMUSG00000024122
UniProt	O15530	Q9Z2A0
RefSeq (mRNA)	NM_001261816; NM_002613; NM_031268	NM_001080773; NM_001286662; NM_011062
RefSeq (protein)	NP_001248745; NP_002604; NP_112558	NP_001074242; NP_001273591; NP_035192
Location (UCSC)	Chr 16: 2.54 – 2.6 Mb	Chr 17: 24.29 – 24.37 Mb
PubMed search
- Wikidata
View/Edit Human	View/Edit Mouse

In the field of biochemistry, PDPK1 refers to the protein 3-phosphoinositide-dependent protein kinase-1, an enzyme which is encoded by the PDPK1 gene in humans. It is implicated in the development and progression of melanomas.

== Function ==
PDPK1 is a master kinase, which is crucial for the activation of AKT/PKB and many other AGC kinases including PKC, S6K, SGK. An important role for PDPK1 is in the signaling pathways activated by several growth factors and hormones including insulin signaling.

Mice lacking PDPK1 die during early embryonic development, indicating that this enzyme is critical for transmitting the growth-promoting signals necessary for normal mammalian development.

Mice that are deficient in PDPK1 have a ≈40% decrease in body mass, mild glucose intolerance, and are resistant to cancer brought about by hyperactivation of the PI3K pathway (PTEN+/-).

Plant PDK1 plays an important role in regulating PIN-mediated auxin transport, and is thus involved in various developmental processes, such as embryonic development, lateral root formation, vasculature patterning, apical hook formation, gravitropism and phototropism.

== Etymology ==
PDPK1 stands for 3-phosphoinositide-dependent protein kinase 1. PDPK1 functions downstream of PI3K through PDPK1's interaction with membrane phospholipids including phosphatidylinositols, phosphatidylinositol (3,4)-bisphosphate and phosphatidylinositol (3,4,5)-trisphosphate. PI3K indirectly regulates PDPK1 by phosphorylating phosphatidylinositols which in turn generates phosphatidylinositol (3,4)-bisphosphate and phosphatidylinositol (3,4,5)-trisphosphate. However, PDPK1 is believed to be constitutively active and does not always require phosphatidylinositols for its activities.

Phosphatidylinositols are only required for the activation at the membrane of some substrates including AKT. PDPK1 however does not require membrane lipid binding for the efficient phosphorylation of most of its substrates in the cytosol (not at the cell membrane).

== Structure ==
The structure of PDPK1 can be divided into two domains; the kinase or catalytic domain and the PH domain. The PH domain functions mainly in the interaction of PDPK1 with phosphatidylinositol (3,4)-bisphosphate and phosphatidylinositol (3,4,5)-trisphosphate which is important in localization and activation of some of membrane associated PDPK1's substrates including AKT.

The kinase domain has three ligand binding sites; the substrate binding site, the ATP binding site, and the docking site (also known as PIF pocket). Several PDPK1 substrates including S6K and Protein kinase C, require the binding at this docking site. Small molecule allosteric activators of PDPK1 were shown to selectively inhibit activation of substrates that require docking site interaction. These compounds do not bind to the active site and allow PDPK1 to activate other substrates that do not require docking site interaction. PDPK1 is constitutively active and at present, there is no known inhibitor proteins for PDPK1.

The activation of PDPK1's main effector, AKT, is believed to require a proper orientation of the kinase and PH domains of PDPK1 and AKT at the membrane.

== Interactions ==
Phosphoinositide-dependent kinase-1 has been shown to interact with:

- AKT1,
- PKN2,
- PRKACA,
- PRKCD,
- PRKCI,
- Protein kinase Mζ,
- Protein kinase N1,
- SGK,
- SLC9A3R2, and
- YWHAH
