= Protein kinase B =

Set of three serine threonine-specific protein kinases

AKT1
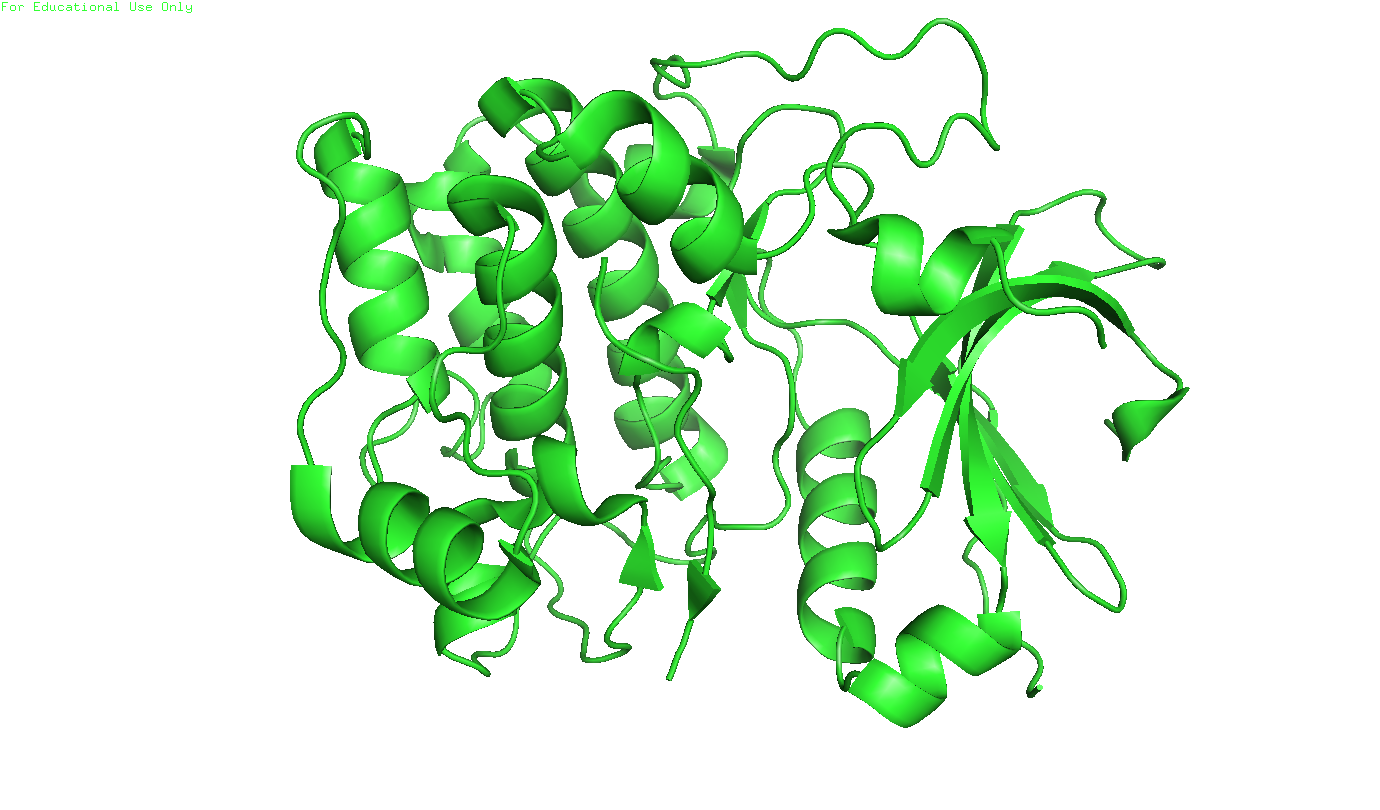
- Ribbon Representation of crystal structure of Akt-1-inhibitor complexes.

Identifiers
- Symbol: AKT1
- NCBI gene: 207
- HGNC: 391
- OMIM: 164730
- RefSeq: NM_005163
- UniProt: P31749

Other data
- Locus: Chr. 14 q32.32-32.33
Search for
- Structures: Swiss-model
- Domains: InterPro

AKT2
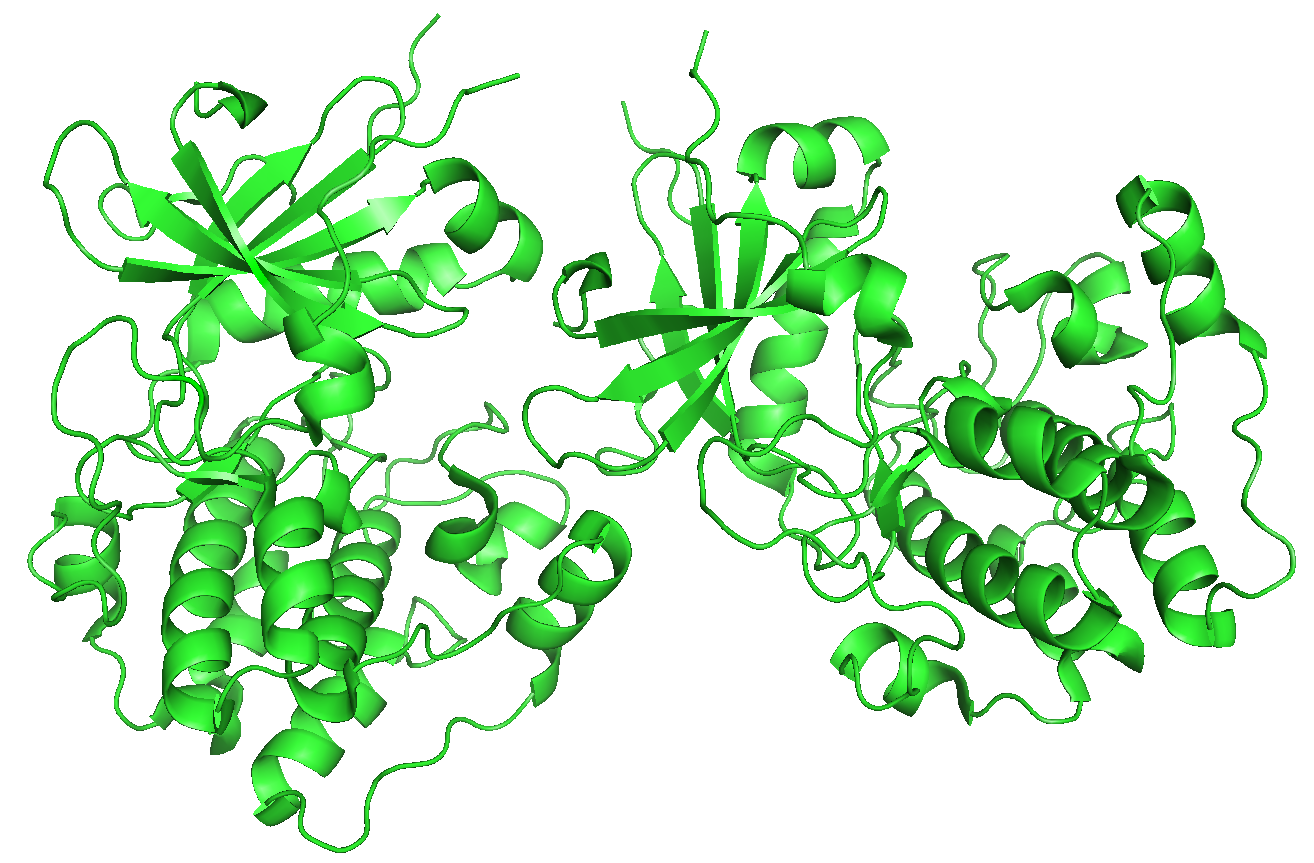
- Crystal structure of Akt-2-inhibitor complexes.

Identifiers
- Symbol: AKT2
- NCBI gene: 208
- HGNC: 392
- OMIM: 164731
- RefSeq: NM_001626
- UniProt: P31751

Other data
- Locus: Chr. 19 q13.1-13.2
Search for
- Structures: Swiss-model
- Domains: InterPro

AKT3

Identifiers
- Symbol: AKT3
- NCBI gene: 10000
- HGNC: 393
- OMIM: 611223
- RefSeq: NM_181690
- UniProt: Q9Y243

Other data
- Locus: Chr. 1 q43-44
Search for
- Structures: Swiss-model
- Domains: InterPro

Protein kinase B (PKB), also known as Akt, is the collective name of a set of three serine/threonine-specific protein kinases: Akt1, Akt2, and Akt3. Akt1 and Akt2 play key roles in cellular processes such as glucose metabolism, apoptosis, cell proliferation, transcription, and cell migration.

== Family members - Isoforms ==
There are three different genes that encode isoforms of protein kinase B. These three genes are referred to as AKT1, AKT2, and AKT3 and encode the RAC alpha, beta, and gamma serine/threonine protein kinases respectively. The terms PKB and Akt may refer to the products of all three genes collectively, but sometimes are used to refer to PKB alpha and Akt1 alone.

Akt1 is involved in cellular survival pathways, by inhibiting apoptotic processes. Akt1 is also able to induce protein synthesis pathways, and is therefore a key signaling protein in the cellular pathways that lead to skeletal muscle hypertrophy and general tissue growth. A mouse model with complete deletion of the Akt1 gene manifests growth retardation and increased spontaneous apoptosis in tissues such as testes and thymus. Since it can block apoptosis and thereby promote cell survival, Akt1 has been implicated as a major factor in many types of cancer. Akt1 is also a positive regulator of cell migration. Akt1 was originally identified as the oncogene in the transforming retrovirus, AKT8.

Akt2 is an important signaling molecule in the insulin signaling pathway. It is required to induce glucose transport. In a mouse which is null for Akt1 but normal for Akt2, glucose homeostasis is unperturbed, but the animals are smaller, consistent with a role for Akt1 in growth. In contrast, mice which do not have Akt2, but have normal Akt1, have mild growth deficiency and display a diabetic phenotype (insulin resistance), again consistent with the idea that Akt2 is more specific for the insulin receptor signaling pathway. Akt2 promotes cell migration as well.

The role of Akt3 is less clear, though it appears to be predominantly expressed in the brain. It has been reported that mice lacking Akt3 have small brains.

Akt isoforms are overexpressed in a variety of human tumors, and, at the genomic level, are amplified in gastric adenocarcinomas (Akt1), ovarian (Akt2), pancreatic (Akt2) and breast (Akt2) cancers.

== Name ==
The name Akt does not refer to its function. The "Ak" in Akt refers to the AKR mouse strain that develops spontaneous thymic lymphomas. The "t" stands for 'thymoma'; the letter was added when a transforming retrovirus was isolated from the Ak mouse strain, which was termed "Akt-8". The authors state, "Stock A Strain k AKR mouse originally inbred in the laboratory of Dr. C. P. Rhoads by K. B. Rhoads at the Rockefeller Institute." When the oncogene encoded in this virus was discovered, it was termed v-Akt. Thus, the more recently identified human analogs were named accordingly.

== Regulation ==
Akt1 is involved in the PI3K/AKT/mTOR pathway and other signaling pathways.

=== Binding phospholipids ===
The Akt proteins possess a protein domain known as a PH domain, or pleckstrin homology domain, named after pleckstrin, the protein in which it was first discovered. This domain binds to phosphoinositides with high affinity. In the case of the PH domain of the Akt proteins, it binds either PIP_{3} (phosphatidylinositol (3,4,5)-trisphosphate, PtdIns(3,4,5)P_{3}) or PIP_{2} (phosphatidylinositol (3,4)-bisphosphate, PtdIns(3,4)P_{2}). This is useful for control of cellular signaling because the di-phosphorylated phosphoinositide PIP_{2} is only phosphorylated by the family of enzymes, PI 3-kinases (phosphoinositide 3-kinase or PI3-K), and only upon receipt of chemical messengers which tell the cell to begin the growth process. For example, PI 3-kinases may be activated by a G protein coupled receptor or receptor tyrosine kinase such as the insulin receptor. Once activated, PI 3-kinase phosphorylates PIP_{2} to form PIP_{3}.

=== Phosphorylation ===
Once correctly positioned at the membrane via binding of PIP3, Akt can then be phosphorylated by its activating kinases, phosphoinositide-dependent kinase-1 (PDPK1 at threonine 308 in Akt1 and threonine 309 in Akt2) and the mammalian target of rapamycin complex 2 (mTORC2 at serine 473 (Akt1) and 474 (Akt2)) which is found at high levels in the fed state, first by mTORC2. mTORC2 therefore functionally acts as the long-sought PDK2 molecule, although other molecules, including integrin-linked kinase (ILK) and mitogen-activated protein kinase-activated protein kinase-2 (MAPKAPK2) can also serve as PDK2. Phosphorylation by mTORC2 stimulates the subsequent phosphorylation of Akt isoforms by PDPK1.

Activated Akt isoforms can then go on to activate or deactivate their myriad substrates (e.g. mTOR) via their kinase activity.

Besides being a downstream effector of PI 3-kinases, Akt isoforms can also be activated in a PI 3-kinase-independent manner. ACK1 or TNK2, a non-receptor tyrosine kinase, phosphorylates Akt at its tyrosine 176 residue, leading to its activation in PI 3-kinase-independent manner. Studies have suggested that cAMP-elevating agents could also activate Akt through protein kinase A (PKA) in the presence of insulin.

=== O-GlcNAcylation ===
Akt can be O-GlcNAcylated by OGT. O-GlcNAcylation of Akt is associated with a decrease in T308 phosphorylation.

=== Ubiquitination ===
Akt1 is normally phosphorylated at position T450 in the turn motif when Akt1 is translated. If Akt1 is not phosphorylated at this position, Akt1 does not fold in the right way. The T450-non-phosphorylated misfolded Akt1 is ubiquitinated and degraded by the proteasome. Akt1 is also phosphorylated at T308 and S473 during IGF-1 response, and the resulting polyphosphorylated Akt is ubiquitinated partly by E3 ligase NEDD4. Most of the ubiquitinated-phosphorylated-Akt1 is degraded by the proteasome, while a small amount of phosphorylated-Akt1 translocates to the nucleus in a ubiquitination-dependent way to phosphorylate its substrate. A cancer-derived mutant Akt1 (E17K) is more readily ubiquitinated and phosphorylated than the wild type Akt1. The ubiquitinated-phosphorylated-Akt1 (E17K) translocates more efficiently to the nucleus than the wild type Akt1. This mechanism may contribute to E17K-Akt1-induced cancer in humans.

=== Lipid phosphatases and PIP3 ===
PI3K-dependent Akt1 activation can be regulated through the tumor suppressor PTEN, which works essentially as the opposite of PI3K mentioned above. PTEN acts as a phosphatase to dephosphorylate PIP3 back to PIP2. This removes the membrane-localization factor from the Akt signaling pathway. Without this localization, the rate of Akt1 activation decreases significantly, as do all of the downstream pathways that depend on Akt1 for activation.

PIP3 can also be de-phosphorylated at the "5" position by the SHIP family of inositol phosphatases, SHIP1 and SHIP2. These poly-phosphate inositol phosphatases dephosphorylate PIP3 to form PIP2.

=== Protein phosphatases ===
The phosphatases in the PHLPP family, PHLPP1 and PHLPP2 have been shown to directly de-phosphorylate, and therefore inactivate, distinct Akt isoforms. PHLPP2 dephosphorylates Akt1 and Akt3, whereas PHLPP1 is specific for Akt2 and Akt3.

== Function ==
The Akt kinases regulate cellular survival and metabolism by binding and regulating many downstream effectors, e.g. Nuclear Factor-κB, Bcl-2 family proteins, master lysosomal regulator TFEB and murine double minute 2 (MDM2).

=== Cell survival ===
Overview of signal transduction pathways involved in apoptosis.

Akt kinases can promote growth factor-mediated cell survival both directly and indirectly. BAD is a pro-apoptotic protein of the Bcl-2 family. Akt1 can phosphorylate BAD on Ser136, which makes BAD dissociate from the Bcl-2/Bcl-X complex and lose the pro-apoptotic function. Akt1 can also activate NF-κB via regulating IκB kinase (IKK), thus result in transcription of pro-survival genes.

=== Cell cycle ===
The Akt isoforms are known to play a role in the cell cycle. Under various circumstances, activation of Akt1 was shown to overcome cell cycle arrest in G1 and G2 phases. Moreover, activated Akt1 may enable proliferation and survival of cells that have sustained a potentially mutagenic impact and, therefore, may contribute to acquisition of mutations in other genes.

=== Metabolism ===
Akt2 is required for the insulin-induced translocation of glucose transporter 4 (GLUT4) to the plasma membrane. Glycogen synthase kinase 3 (GSK-3) could be inhibited upon phosphorylation by Akt, which results in increase of glycogen synthesis. GSK3 is also involved in Wnt signaling cascade, so Akt might be also implicated in the Wnt pathway. Its role in HCV induced steatosis is unknown.

=== Lysosomal biogenesis and autophagy ===
Akt1 regulates TFEB, a master controller of lysosomal biogenesis, by direct phosphorylation at serine 467. Phosphorylated TFEB is excluded from the nucleus and less active. Pharmacological inhibition of Akt promotes nuclear translocation of TFEB, lysosomal biogenesis and autophagy.

=== Angiogenesis ===
Akt1 has also been implicated in angiogenesis and tumor development. Although deficiency of Akt1 in mice inhibited physiological angiogenesis, it enhanced pathological angiogenesis and tumor growth associated with matrix abnormalities in skin and blood vessels.

== Clinical relevance ==
Akt proteins are associated with tumor cell survival, proliferation, and invasiveness. The activation of Akt is also one of the most frequent alterations observed in human cancer and tumor cells. Tumor cells that have constantly active Akt may depend on Akt for survival. Therefore, understanding the Akt proteins and their pathways is important for the creation of better therapies to treat cancer and tumor cells. A mosaic-activating mutation (c. 49G→A, p.Glu17Lys) in Akt1 is associated with the Proteus Syndrome, which causes overgrowth of skin, connective tissue, brain and other tissues.

=== Akt inhibitors ===
Akt inhibitors may treat cancers such as neuroblastoma. Some Akt inhibitors have undergone clinical trials. In 2007 VQD-002 had a phase I trial. In 2010 Perifosine reached phase II. but it failed phase III in 2012.

Miltefosine is approved for leishmaniasis and under investigation for other indications including HIV.

Akt1 is now thought to be the "key" for cell entry by both of the subtypes of herpes simplex virus, HSV-1 and HSV-2. Intracellular calcium release by the cell allows for entry by the herpes virus; the virus activates Akt1, which in turn causes the release of calcium. Treating the cells with Akt inhibitors before virus exposure leads to a significantly lower rate of infection.

MK-2206 reported phase 1 results for advanced solid tumors in 2011, and subsequently has undergone numerous phase II studies for a wide variety of cancer types.

In 2013 AZD5363 reported phase I results regarding solid tumors. with a study of AZD5363 with olaparib reporting in 2016.

Ipatasertib is in phase II trials for breast cancer.

Rizavasertib was in clinical trials, but these were halted. Now used as a tool compound.

Engasertib is currently in clinical trials for the treatment of hereditary haemorrhagic telangiectasia.

=== Decreased Akt isoforms can cause deleterious effects ===
Akt isoform activation is associated with many malignancies; however, a research group from Massachusetts General Hospital and Harvard University unexpectedly observed a converse role for Akt and one of its downstream effector FOXOs in acute myeloid leukemia (AML). They claimed that low levels of Akt activity associated with elevated levels of FOXOs are required to maintain the function and immature state of leukemia-initiating cells (LICs). FOXOs are active, implying reduced Akt activity, in ~40% of AML patient samples regardless of genetic subtype; and either activation of Akt or compound deletion of FoxO1/3/4 reduced leukemic cell growth in a mouse model.

=== Hyperactivation of Akt1 can cause deleterious effects ===
Two studies show that Akt1 is involved in Juvenile Granulosa Cell tumors (JGCT). In-frame duplications in the pleckstrin-homology domain (PHD) of the protein were found in more than 60% of JGCTs occurring in girls under 15 years of age. The JGCTs without duplications carried point mutations affecting highly conserved residues. The mutated proteins carrying the duplications displayed a non-wild-type subcellular distribution, with a marked enrichment at the plasma membrane. This led to a striking degree of Akt1 activation demonstrated by a strong phosphorylation level and corroborated by reporter assays.

Analysis by RNA-Seq pinpointed a series of differentially expressed genes, involved in cytokine and hormone signaling and cell division-related processes. Further analyses pointed to a possible dedifferentiation process and suggested that most of the transcriptomic dysregulations might be mediated by a limited set of transcription factors perturbed by Akt1 activation. These results incriminate somatic mutations of Akt1 as major probably driver events in the pathogenesis of JGCTs.

== See also ==
- Akt/PKB signaling pathway
- Discovery and development of mTOR inhibitors
- PI3K/AKT/mTOR pathway
- Akt inhibitor
- PTEN
