= Insulin receptor substrate =

Insulin receptor substrates (IRS) are important ligands in the insulin response of human cells.

IRS-1, for example, is an IRS protein that contains a phosphotyrosine binding-domain (PTB-domain). In addition, the insulin receptor contains a NPXY motif. The PTB-domain binds the NPXY sequence. Thus, the insulin receptor binds IRS.

== Genes ==
- IRS1 (see also Insulin receptor substrate 1)
- IRS2 (see also Insulin receptor substrate 2)
- IRS3P - a pseudogene
- IRS4
