= Lewis Tilney =

- Education: Cornell University (PhD)
- Awards: Guggenheim Fellowship (1975); National Academy of Sciences (1998)
- Scientific career
- Fields: Cell Biology
- Workplaces: University of Pennsylvania

Lewis Gawtry Tilney is an American cell biologist and professor emeritus at the University of Pennsylvania. He received his Ph.D. from Cornell University Medical School in 1964. Tilney is known for studying the cytoskeleton of animal cells, specifically how different components affect the cytoskeleton's overall properties.

== Research and publications ==
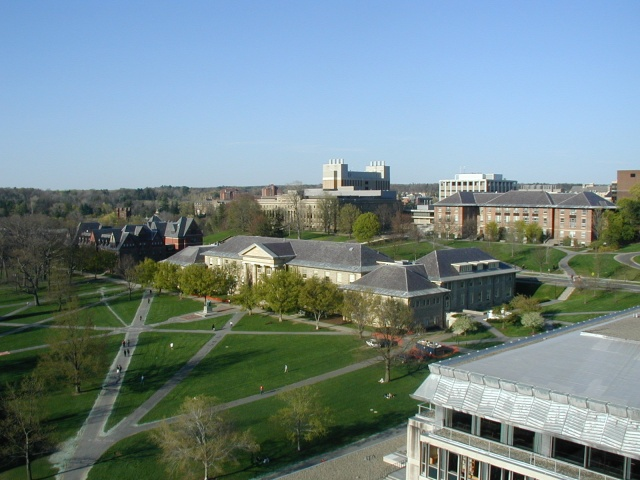
Cornell University

=== Research interests ===
Tilney's research interests and primary research focus has been on the cytoskeleton of specific portions of animal cells. Through this research it was his goal to identify the cause behind certain properties of the cytoskeleton including length, distribution, and the location of each type of filament and microtubule. Some specific elements Tilney has investigated is the microvilli of intestinal epithelial cells, the actin tail of Listeria, the stereocilia of hair cells in the inner ear, and the bristles of Drosophila.

=== Drosophila ===
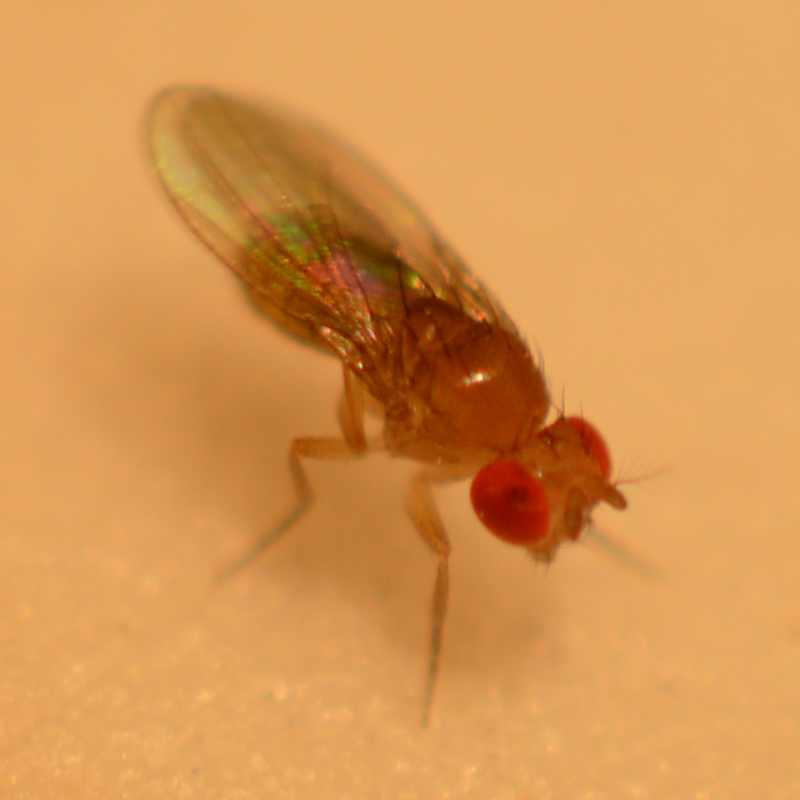
Drosophila

Tilney’s research in Drosophila focused on the actin filaments. He observed the cross-linking of adjacent filaments and using forked proteins and fascin investigated how the bundles formed. He observed that in mutants, the aggregation of bundles did not occur which resulted in significantly smaller bundle sizes compared to the wild type. From this, he performed experiments using and removing cross-linking agents forked proteins and fascin to investigate each cross-linkers role in properly forming actin bundles. From his work, he reached the conclusions that forked proteins are used early in the process to aggregate smaller bundles into large ones and they also help the bundles come together. Forked proteins also help fascin entry into the bundles which allows the bundles to cross-link and align properly. He conducted further experiments using antibodies specific to fascin and the forked proteins to show when they were present in actin formation. From this research, he was able to identify that fascin was present predominantly during bundle elongation whereas the forked proteins were present during bundle formation and consequently played a significant role in the shape and size of the actin bundles. Further, it was demonstrated the amount of actin polymerization was also limited by the area where actin had the ability to adhere to connector material.

=== Toxoplasma gondii ===
Tilney also conducted research focused on Toxoplasma gondii and how its invasive stages acted in an actin-dependent fashion. To identify whether filaments form, Tilney induced actin polymerization on the anterior end of the parasite molecules using Jasplakinolide, an actin polymerization promoting and stabilizing molecule. Following the introduction of Jasplakinolide, it was observed that the actin-binding protein myosin connected to the newly formed polymer which confirmed its identity to be actin. This represented the first time that this actin polymerization had been observed in parasites. Later research went on to show how protease inhibitors including cysteine and serine can modify the post-translational modifications in the processing of secretory proteins in the parasite.

== Awards and honors ==
Tilney was elected into the National Academy of Sciences for cellular and developmental biology in 1998. He was elected alongside three other scientists in the field of cellular biology including Michael Levine, Lelio Orci, and Joan Ruderman. He was also awarded the Guggenheim Fellowship in 1975. This fellowship is awarded to those individuals who show excellent creativity in the sciences and produce scholarly work. It is awarded in the form of a grant that enables academic research.
