= Insulin receptor substrate 1 =

Protein found in humans

IRS1
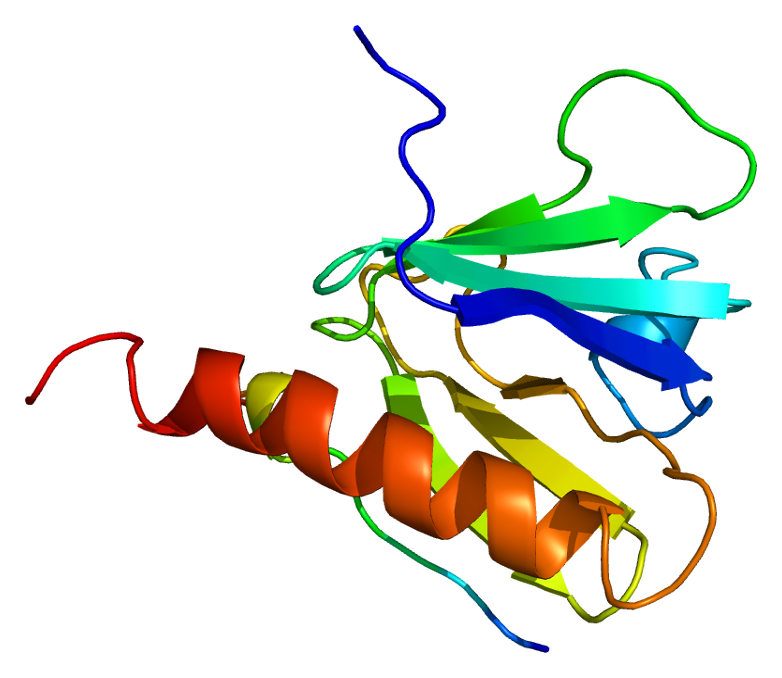

Identifiers
- Aliases: IRS1, HIRS-1, insulin receptor substrate 1
- External IDs: OMIM: 147545; MGI: 99454; GeneCards: IRS1
Available structures
PDB	Ortholog search: PDBe RCSB
PDB	List of PDB id codes 1IRS, 1K3A, 1QQG, 2Z8C

Gene location (Human)
Chr.	Chromosome 2 (human)
Band	2q36.3	Start	226,731,312 bp
Band	2q36.3	End	226,799,820 bp

Gene location (Mouse)
Chr.	Chromosome 1 (mouse)
Band	1 C5|1 42.0 cM	Start	82,210,822 bp
Band	1 C5|1 42.0 cM	End	82,269,137 bp
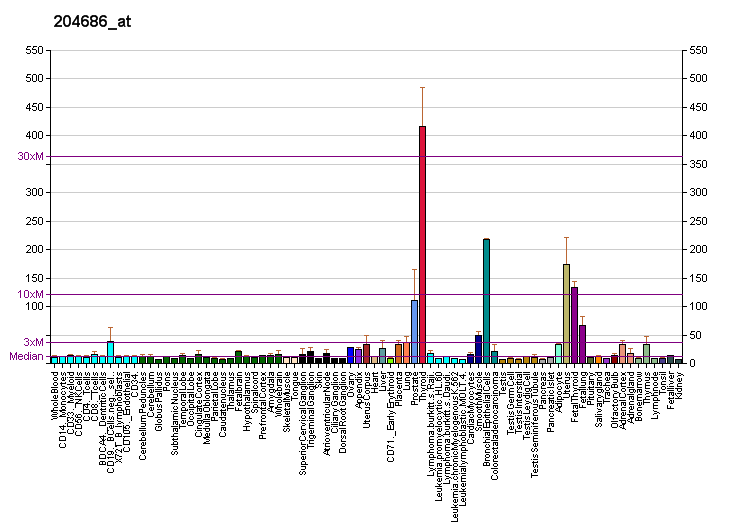
RNA expression pattern
Bgee	Human / Mouse (ortholog); Top expressed in: Skeletal muscle tissue of rectus abdominis; tibia; epithelium of lactiferous gland; lactiferous duct; cartilage tissue; vastus lateralis muscle; decidua; biceps brachii; stromal cell of endometrium; mucosa of urinary bladder / Top expressed in: calvaria; pineal gland; triceps brachii muscle; vastus lateralis muscle; sternocleidomastoid muscle; temporal muscle; body of femur; digastric muscle; ankle; vestibular sensory epithelium; More reference expression data
BioGPS	More reference expression data
Gene ontology
Molecular function	insulin-like growth factor receptor binding; transmembrane receptor protein tyrosine kinase adaptor activity; SH2 domain binding; signal transducer activity; phosphatidylinositol 3-kinase binding; protein binding; protein kinase C binding; phosphatidylinositol-4,5-bisphosphate 3-kinase activity; 1-phosphatidylinositol-3-kinase activity; phosphotyrosine residue binding; insulin receptor binding
Cellular component	cytoplasm; intracellular membrane-bounded organelle; caveola; insulin receptor complex; nucleus; cytosol; plasma membrane
Biological process	positive regulation of fatty acid beta-oxidation; positive regulation of glucose import; insulin-like growth factor receptor signaling pathway; negative regulation of insulin secretion; positive regulation of glycogen biosynthetic process; glucose homeostasis; response to peptide hormone; positive regulation of glucose metabolic process; MAPK cascade; positive regulation of phosphatidylinositol 3-kinase activity; response to insulin; negative regulation of insulin receptor signaling pathway; positive regulation of cell population proliferation; cellular response to insulin stimulus; phosphatidylinositol 3-kinase signaling; positive regulation of insulin receptor signaling pathway; phosphatidylinositol-mediated signaling; signal transduction; insulin receptor signaling pathway; phosphatidylinositol phosphate biosynthetic process; phosphatidylinositol-3-phosphate biosynthetic process; interleukin-7-mediated signaling pathway; positive regulation of protein kinase B signaling; cellular response to fatty acid
Sources:Amigo / QuickGO
Orthologs
Databases	NCBI: entry; OMA: entry
Species	Human	Mouse
Entrez	3667	16367
Ensembl	ENSG00000169047	ENSMUSG00000055980
UniProt	P35568	P35569
RefSeq (mRNA)	NM_005544	NM_010570
RefSeq (protein)	NP_005535	NP_034700
Location (UCSC)	Chr 2: 226.73 – 226.8 Mb	Chr 1: 82.21 – 82.27 Mb
PubMed search
- Wikidata
View/Edit Human	View/Edit Mouse

Insulin receptor substrate 1 (IRS-1) is a signaling adapter protein that in humans is encoded by the IRS1 gene. It is a 180 kDa protein with amino acid sequence of 1242 residues. It contains a single pleckstrin homology (PH) domain at the N-terminus and a PTB domain ca. 40 residues downstream of this, followed by a poorly conserved C-terminus tail. Together with IRS2, IRS3 (pseudogene) and IRS4, it is homologous to the Drosophila protein chico, whose disruption extends the median lifespan of flies up to 48%. Similarly, Irs1 mutant mice experience moderate life extension and delayed age-related pathologies.

== Function ==
Insulin receptor substrate 1 plays a key role in transmitting signals from the insulin receptor (IR) and insulin-like growth factor 1 receptor (IGF-1) to intracellular pathways PI3K / Akt and Erk MAP kinase pathways. Tyrosine phosphorylation of IRS-1 by insulin receptor (IR) introduces multiple binding sites for proteins bearing SH2 homology domain, such as PI3K, Grb-2/Sos complex and SHP2. PI3K, involved in interaction with IRS-1, produces PIP3, which, in turn, recruits Akt kinase. Further, Akt kinase is activated via phosphorylation of its T308 residue and analogous sites in PKC by PDK1. This phosphorylation is absent in tissues lacking IRS-1. The cascade is followed by glucose uptake. Formation of the Grb-2/Sos complex, also known as the RAS guanine nucleotide exchange factor complex, results in ERK1/2 activation. IRS-1 signal transduction may be inhibited by SHP2 in some tissues.

Tyrosine phosphorylation of the insulin receptors or IGF-1 receptors, upon extracellular ligand binding, induces the cytoplasmic binding of IRS-1 to these receptors, through its PTB domains. Multiple tyrosine residues of IRS-1 itself are then phosphorylated by these receptors. This enables IRS-1 to activate several signalling pathways, including the PI3K pathway and the MAP kinase pathway.

An alternative multi-site phosphorylation of Serine/Threonine in IRS-1 regulates insulin signaling positively and negatively. C-terminal region contains most of the phosphorylation sites of the protein. The C-terminal tail is not structured, therefore the mechanisms of regulation of IRS-1 by phosphorylation still remain unclear. It has been shown that TNFα causes insulin resistance and multi-site S/T phosphorylation, which results in block of interaction between IRS-1 and juxtamembrane domain peptide, thus converting IRS-1 into an inactive state.

IRS-1 plays important biological function for both metabolic and mitogenic (growth promoting) pathways: mice deficient of IRS1 have only a mild diabetic phenotype, but a pronounced growth impairment, i.e., IRS-1 knockout mice only reach 50% of the weight of normal mice.

== Regulation ==
The cellular protein levels of IRS-1 are regulated by the Cullin-7 E3 ubiquitin ligase, which targets IRS-1 for ubiquitin mediated degradation by the proteasome. Different Serine phosphorylation of IRS-1, caused by various molecules, such as fatty acids, TNFα and AMPK, has different effects on the protein, but most of these effects include cellular re-localization, conformational and steric changes. These processes lead to decrease in Tyrosine phosphorylation by insulin receptors and diminished PI3K recruitment. Altogether, these mechanisms stimulate IRS-1 degradation and insulin resistance. Other inhibitory pathways include SOCS proteins and O-GlcNAcylation of IRS-1. SOCS proteins act by binding to IR and by interfering with IR phosphorylation of IRS-1, therefore attenuating insulin signaling. They can also bind to JAK, causing a subsequent decrease in IRS-1 tyrosine phosphorylation. During insulin resistance induced by hyperglycemia, glucose accumulates in tissues as its hexosamine metabolite UDP-GlcNAc. This metabolite if present in high amounts leads to O-GlcNAc protein modifications. IRS-1 can undergo this modification, which results in its phosphorylation and functional suppression.

== Interactions ==
IRS1 has been shown to interact (also concerted activity) with:

- Bcl-2,
- Grb2,
- INSR,
- IGF1R,
- JAK1,
- JAK2,
- MAPK8,
- PIK3R1
- PIK3R3,
- PTK2,
- PTPN11,
- PTPN1, and
- YWHAE.

== Role in cancer ==
IRS-1, as a signalling adapter protein, is able to integrate different signalling cascades, which indicates its possible role in cancer progression. IRS-1 protein is known to be involved in various types of cancer, including colorectal, lung, prostate and breast cancer. IRS-1 integrates signalling from insulin receptor (InsR), insulin-like growth factor-1 receptor (IGF1R) and many other cytokine receptors and is elevated in β-catenin induced cells. Some evidence shows that TCF/LEF-β-catenin complexes directly regulate IRS-1. IRS-1 is required for maintenance of neoplasmic phenotype in adenomatous polyposis coli (APC) - mutated cells, it is also needed for transformation in ectopically expressing oncogenic β-catenin cells. IRS-1 dominant-negative mutant functions as tumor suppressor, whereas ectopic IRS-1 stimulates oncogenic transformation. IRS-1 is upregulated in colorectal cancers (CRC) with elevated levels of β-catenin, c-MYC, InsRβ and IGF1R. IRS-1 promotes CRC metastasis to the liver. Decreased apoptosis of crypt stem cells is associated with colon cancer risk. Reduced expression of IRS-1 in Apc (min/+) mutated mice shows increased irradiation-induced apoptosis in crypt. Deficiency in IRS-1 - partial (+/-) or absolute (-/-) - in Apc (min/+) mice demonstrates reduced amount of tumors comparing to IRS-1 (+/+)/ Apc (min/+) mice.

In lung adenocarcinoma cell line A549 overexpression of IRS-1 leads to reduced growth. Tumor infiltrating neutrophils have recently been thought to adjust tumor growth and invasiveness. Neutrophil elastase is shown to degrade IRS-1 by gaining access to endosomal compartment of carcinoma cell. IRS-1 degradation induces cell proliferation in mouse and human adenocarcinomas. Ablation of IRS-1 alters downstream signalling through phosphatidylinositol-3 kinase (PI3K), causing an increased interaction of it with platelet-derived growth factor receptor (PDGFR). Therefore, IRS-1 acts as major regulator of PI3K in lung adenocarcinoma.

Some evidence shows role of IRS-1 in hepatocellular carcinoma (HCC). In rat model, IRS-1 focal overexpression is associated with early events of hepatocarcinogenesis. During progression of preneoplastic foci into hepatocellular carcinomas expression of IRS-1 gradually decreases, which is characterises a metabolic shift heading towards malignant neoplastic phenotype. Transgenic mice, co-expressing IRS-1 and hepatitis Bx (HBx) protein, demonstrate higher rate of hepatocellular displasia that results in HCC development. Expressed alone, IRS-1 and HBx are not sufficient to induce neoplastic alterations in the liver, though their paired expression switches on IN/IRS-1/MAPK and Wnt/β-catenin cascades, causing HCC transformation.

LNCaP prostate cancer cells increase cell adhesion and diminish cell motility via IGF-1 independent mechanism, when IRS-1 is ectopically expressed in the cells. These effects are mediated by PI3K. Uncanonical phosphorylation of Serine 612 by PI3K of IRS-1 protein is due to hyper-activation of Akt/PKB pathway in LNCaP. IRS-1 interacts with integrin α5β1, activating an alternative signalling cascade. This cascade results in decreased cell motility opposing to IGF-1 - dependent mechanism. Loss of IRS-1 expression and PTEN mutations in LNCaP cells could promote metastasis. Ex vivo studies of IRS-1 involvement in prostate cancer show ambiguous results. Down-regulation of IGF1R in bone marrow biopsies of metastatic prostate cancer goes along with down-regulation of IRS-1 and significant reduction of PTEN in 3 out of 12 cases. Most of the tumors still express IRS-1 and IGF1R during progression of the metastatic disease.

IRS-1 has a functional role in breast cancer progression and metastasis. Overexpression of PTEN in MCF-7 epithelial breast cancer cells inhibits cell growth by inhibiting MAPK pathway. ERK phosphorylation through IRS-1/Grb-2/Sos pathway is inhibited by phosphatase activity of PTEN. PTEN does not have effect on IRS-1 independent MAPK activation. When treated with insulin, ectopic expression of PTEN in MCF-7 suppresses IRS-1/Grb-2/Sos complex formation due to differential phosphorylation of IRS-1. Overexpression of IRS-1 has been linked to antiestrogen resistance and hormone independence in breast cancer. Tamoxifen (TAM) inhibits IRS-1 function, therefore suppressing IRS-1/PI3K signalling cascade in estrogen receptor positive (ER+) MCF-7 cell line. IRS-1 siRNA is able to reduce IRS-1 transcript level, thereby reducing protein expression in MCF-7 ER+ cells. Reduction of IRS-1 leads to decreased survival of these cells. siRNA treatment effects are additive to effects of TAM treatment. IGFRs and estrogen coaction facilitates growth in different breast cancer cell lines, however amplification of IGF1R signalling can abrogate need of estrogen for transformation and growth of MCF-7 cells. IRS-1 overexpression in breast cancer cells decreased estrogen requirements. This decrease is dependent on IRS-1 levels in the cells. Estradiol enhances expression of IRS-1 and activity of ERK1/2 and PI3K/Akt pathways in MCF-7 and CHO cells transfected with mouse IRS-1 promoter. Estradiol acts directly on IRS-1 regulatory sequences and positively regulates IRS-1 mRNA production. Decreased anchorage- dependent/independent cell growth and initiation of cell death under low growth factor and estrogen conditions are observed in MCF-7 cells with down-regulated IRS-1. mir126 is underexpressed in breast cancer cells. mir126 targets IRS-1 at transcriptional level and inhibits transition from G1/G0 phase to S phase during cell cycle in HEK293 and MCF-7 cells. Transgenic mice overexpressing IRS-1 develop metastatic breast cancer. The tumors demonstrate squamous differentiation which is associated with β-catenin pathway. IRS-1 interacts with β-catenin both in vitro and in vivo. IRS-1 and its homologue IRS-2 play distinct roles in breast cancer progression and metastasis. Overexpression of either one is sufficient to cause tumorogenesis in vivo. Frequency of lung metastasis in IRS-1 deficient tumor is elevated opposing to IRS-2 deficient tumor, where it is decreased. Basically, IRS-2 has a positive impact on metastasis of breast cancer whereas a stronger metastatic potential is observed when IRS-1 is down-regulated. IRS-1 is strongly expressed in ductal carcinoma in situ, when IRS-2 is elevated in invasive tumors. Increased IRS-1 makes MCF-7 cells susceptible to specific chemotherapeutic agents, such as taxol, etoposide, and vincristine. Therefore, IRS-1 can be a good pointer of specific drug therapies effectiveness for breast cancer treatment.
