= Trappin protein transglutaminase binding domain =

Cementoin
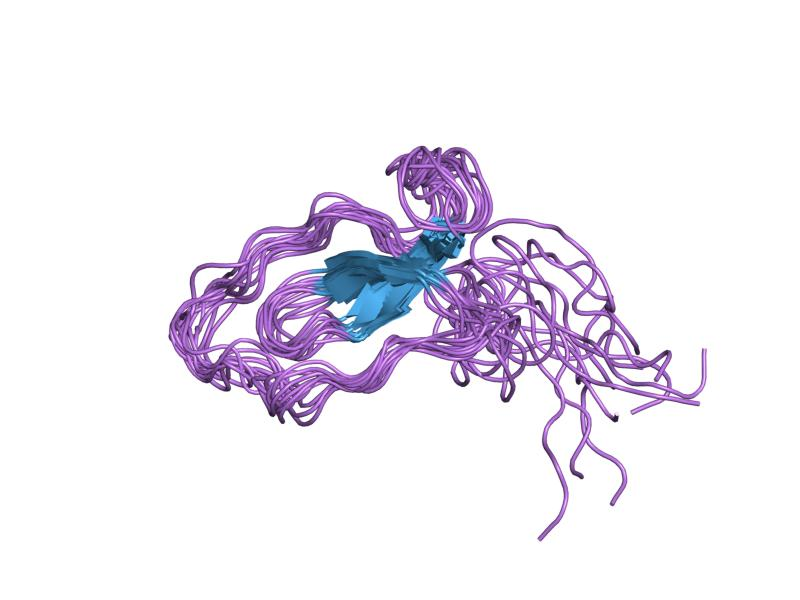
- solution structure of r-elafin, a specific inhibitor of elastase, nmr, 11 structures

Identifiers
- Symbol: Cementoin
- Pfam: PF10511
- InterPro: IPR019541
Available protein structures:
- PDB: IPR019541 PF10511 (ECOD; PDBsum)
- AlphaFold: IPR019541; PF10511

In molecular biology, the trappin protein transglutaminase binding domain or cementoin is a protein domain found at the N-terminus of Whey Acidic Protein (WAP) domain-containing protease inhibitors such as trappin-2. This N-terminal domain enables it to become cross-linked to extracellular matrix proteins by transglutaminase. This domain contains several repeated motifs with the consensus sequence Gly-Gln-Asp-Pro-Val-Lys, and these together can anchor the whole molecule to extracellular matrix proteins, such as laminin, fibronectin, beta-crystallin, collagen IV, fibrinogen, and elastin, by transglutaminase-catalysed cross-links. The whole domain is rich in glutamine and lysine, thus allowing transglutaminase(s) to catalyse the formation of an intermolecular epsilon-(gamma-glutamyl)lysine isopeptide bond.
