= NISCH =

Protein-coding gene in the species Homo sapiens

Available structures
PDB	Ortholog search: PDBe RCSB
PDB	List of PDB id codes 3P0C

Identifiers
- Aliases: NISCH, I-1, IR1, IRAS, hIRAS, nischarin
- External IDs: OMIM: 615507; MGI: 1928323; HomoloGene: 130564; GeneCards: NISCH; OMA:NISCH - orthologs

Gene location (Human)
Chr.	Chromosome 3 (human)
Band	3p21.1	Start	52,455,118 bp
Band	3p21.1	End	52,493,068 bp

Gene location (Mouse)
Chr.	Chromosome 14 (mouse)
Band	14|14 B	Start	30,892,887 bp
Band	14|14 B	End	30,938,903 bp
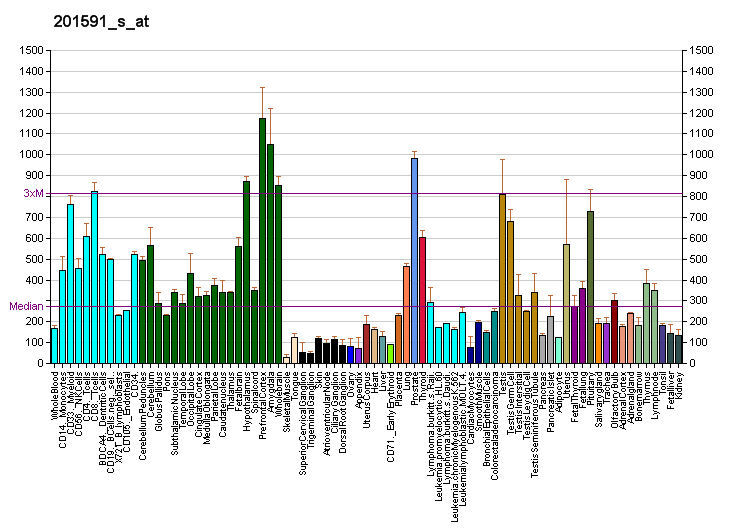
RNA expression pattern
Bgee	Human / Mouse (ortholog); Top expressed in: middle temporal gyrus; right hemisphere of cerebellum; pituitary gland; anterior pituitary; Brodmann area 23; paraflocculus of cerebellum; canal of the cervix; tibial nerve; entorhinal cortex; left ovary / Top expressed in: internal carotid artery; external carotid artery; CA3 field; saccule; Rostral migratory stream; entorhinal cortex; perirhinal cortex; condyle; choroid plexus of fourth ventricle; fossa; More reference expression data
BioGPS	More reference expression data
Gene ontology
Molecular function	integrin binding; protein binding; phosphatidylinositol binding; identical protein binding; structural constituent of cytoskeleton; protein kinase binding
Cellular component	cytoplasm; recycling endosome; cytosol; endosome; plasma membrane; early endosome; membrane
Biological process	regulation of blood pressure; Rac protein signal transduction; negative regulation of cell migration; regulation of synaptic transmission, GABAergic; actin cytoskeleton organization; norepinephrine secretion; glucose metabolic process; apoptotic process
Sources:Amigo / QuickGO
Orthologs
Species	Human	Mouse
Entrez	11188	64652
Ensembl	ENSG00000010322	ENSMUSG00000021910
UniProt	Q9Y2I1	Q80TM9
RefSeq (mRNA)	NM_001276293; NM_001276294; NM_007184	NM_022656; NM_001347583
RefSeq (protein)	NP_001263222; NP_001263223; NP_009115	NP_001334512; NP_073147
Location (UCSC)	Chr 3: 52.46 – 52.49 Mb	Chr 14: 30.89 – 30.94 Mb
PubMed search
- Wikidata
View/Edit Human	View/Edit Mouse

Nischarin is a protein that in humans is encoded by the NISCH gene.

== Function ==
This gene encodes a nonadrenergic imidazoline-1 receptor protein that localizes to the inner layer of the plasma membrane as well as early and recycling endosome membranes. It is a scaffold protein related to Sorting nexins and it regulates protein cargo traffic. The orthologous mouse protein has been shown to influence cytoskeletal organization and cell migration by binding to alpha-5-beta-1 integrin. In humans, this protein has been shown to bind to the adapter insulin receptor substrate 4 (IRS4) to mediate translocation of alpha-5 integrin from the cell membrane to endosomes. In human cardiac tissue, this gene was found to affect cell growth and death while in neural tissue it affected neuronal growth and differentiation.

== Clinical significance ==
Expression of this protein was reduced in human breast cancers while its overexpression reduced tumor growth and metastasis; possibly by limiting the expression of alpha-5 integrin.

== Interactions ==
NISCH has been shown to interact with IRS4, Integrin alpha 5, and small GTPases Rac1, Rab4a, Rab9a, Rab14 and Rab38 in GTP-bound form. NISCH also interacts with phospholipid PI(3)P via its PX domain.

== See also ==
- Imidazoline receptor
