= F-box protein 40 =

Protein-coding gene in the species Homo sapiens

FBXO40

Identifiers
- Aliases: FBXO40, FBX40, F-box protein 40
- External IDs: OMIM: 609107; MGI: 2443753; GeneCards: FBXO40

Gene location (Human)
Chr.	Chromosome 3 (human)
Band	3q13.33	Start	121,593,379 bp
Band	3q13.33	End	121,630,295 bp

Gene location (Mouse)
Chr.	Chromosome 16 (mouse)
Band	16|16 B3	Start	36,783,822 bp
Band	16|16 B3	End	36,810,829 bp
RNA expression pattern
Bgee	Human / Mouse (ortholog); Top expressed in: glutes; Skeletal muscle tissue of rectus abdominis; Skeletal muscle tissue of biceps brachii; vastus lateralis muscle; triceps brachii muscle; body of tongue; muscle of thigh; myocardium of left ventricle; apex of heart; right ventricle / Top expressed in: muscle of thigh; skeletal muscle tissue; quadriceps femoris muscle; primary oocyte; zygote; secondary oocyte; heart; zone of skin; proximal tubule; human kidney; More reference expression data
BioGPS	n/a
Gene ontology
Molecular function	zinc ion binding; metal ion binding; ubiquitin protein ligase activity; ubiquitin-protein transferase activity; molecular function
Cellular component	cytoplasm; cytosol
Biological process	muscle cell differentiation; protein polyubiquitination; post-translational protein modification
Sources:Amigo / QuickGO
Orthologs
Databases	NCBI: entry; OMA: entry
Species	Human	Mouse
Entrez	51725	207215
Ensembl	ENSG00000163833	ENSMUSG00000047746
UniProt	Q9UH90	P62932
RefSeq (mRNA)	NM_016298	NM_001037321; NM_001358217
RefSeq (protein)	NP_057382	NP_001032398; NP_001345146
Location (UCSC)	Chr 3: 121.59 – 121.63 Mb	Chr 16: 36.78 – 36.81 Mb
PubMed search
- Wikidata
View/Edit Human	View/Edit Mouse

F-box protein 40 is a protein that in humans is encoded by the FBXO40 gene. Fbxo40 induces ubiquitination of IRS1, thus limiting activity of IGF1 signaling (Shi et al, 2011).

== Function ==
Members of the F-box protein family, such as FBXO40, are characterized by an approximately 40-amino acid F-box motif. SCF complexes, formed by SKP1 (MIM 601434), cullin (see CUL1; MIM 603134), and F-box proteins, act as protein-ubiquitin ligases. F-box proteins interact with SKP1 through the F box, and they interact with ubiquitination targets through other protein interaction domains.

Fbxo40 in particular engages a unique substrate, IRS1, which is a protein in the IGF1 signaling pathway. In this way, Fbxo40 causes ubiquitination and degradation of IRS1, blocking further signaling downstream of the IGF1 receptor.
