= EGFL7 =

Protein-coding gene in the species Homo sapiens

Identifiers
- Aliases: EGFL7, NEU1, VE-STATIN, ZNEU1, EGF like domain multiple 7
- External IDs: OMIM: 608582; MGI: 2449923; GeneCards: EGFL7

Gene location (Human)
Chr.	Chromosome 9 (human)
Band	9q34.3	Start	136,658,856 bp
Band	9q34.3	End	136,672,678 bp

Gene location (Mouse)
Chr.	Chromosome 2 (mouse)
Band	2|2 A3	Start	26,470,026 bp
Band	2|2 A3	End	26,483,132 bp
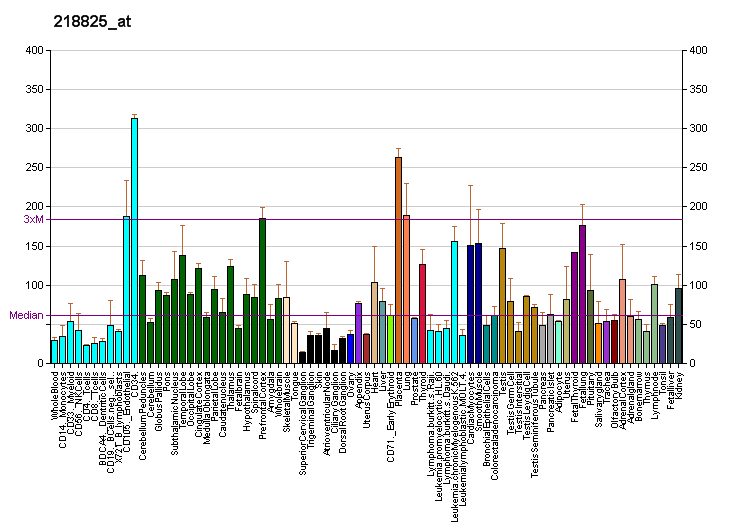
RNA expression pattern
Bgee	Human / Mouse (ortholog); Top expressed in: right lung; apex of heart; upper lobe of left lung; right lobe of thyroid gland; body of uterus; left uterine tube; right auricle of heart; spleen; left lobe of thyroid gland; canal of the cervix / Top expressed in: lung; islet of Langerhans; heart; uterus; adrenal gland; quadriceps femoris muscle; muscle tissue; muscle of thigh; lens; white adipose tissue; More reference expression data
BioGPS	More reference expression data
Gene ontology
Molecular function	calcium ion binding; signaling receptor binding
Cellular component	extracellular matrix; extracellular region; extracellular space; cell surface; collagen-containing extracellular matrix
Biological process	vasculogenesis; multicellular organism development; cell differentiation; cell adhesion; blood vessel development; positive regulation of endothelial cell proliferation; angiogenesis; negative regulation of Notch signaling pathway; anatomical structure development
Sources:Amigo / QuickGO
Orthologs
Databases	NCBI: entry; OMA: entry
Species	Human	Mouse
Entrez	51162	353156
Ensembl	ENSG00000172889	ENSMUSG00000026921
UniProt	Q9UHF1	Q9QXT5
RefSeq (mRNA)	NM_016215; NM_201446	NM_001164564; NM_178444; NM_198724; NM_198725
RefSeq (protein)	NP_057299; NP_958854	NP_001158036; NP_848538; NP_942017; NP_942018
Location (UCSC)	Chr 9: 136.66 – 136.67 Mb	Chr 2: 26.47 – 26.48 Mb
PubMed search
- Wikidata
View/Edit Human	View/Edit Mouse

EGF-like domain-containing protein 7 is a protein that in humans is encoded by the EGFL7 gene. Intron 7 of EGFL7 hosts the miR-126 microRNA gene.

== Gene ==
Epidermal Growth Factor like domain 7 (Egfl7) also known as Vascular Endothelial-statin (VE-statin) codes for a gene mostly expressed in endothelial cells. The egfl7 gene is located on chromosomes 9 and 2 in human and mouse, respectively, and is structured in 11 exons and introns, including intron-1a and 1b which are alternatively transcribed from two different promoters. These transcripts vary only in the first exon and code for the same protein which is initiated in the third exon The seventh intron of the egfl7 gene contains a miRNA site for miR-126 and miR-126.

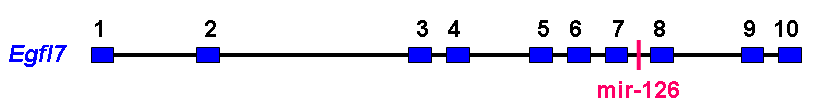
egfl7 gene

== Protein structure and expression ==
The Egfl7 protein (29 kDa) is composed of several putative domains: a putative cleavable signal peptide at the N-terminal end, an EMI domain, found on extracellular matrix proteins, two EGF-like domains and a leucine and valine rich C-terminal region. The first EGF-like domain has a region similar to the DSL (Delta/Serrate/Lag-2) domain found in ligands of the Notch receptors family, the second EGF-like domain is predicted to bind Ca^{2+}. The Eglf7 protein is secreted and associates with the blood vessel extracellular matrix.

Endothelial cell lines naturally express egfl7, on the contrary to non-endothelial cells. In endothelial cells, expression is controlled by the Erg and GATA2 transcription factors and, indirectly by Fli-1. The expression pattern of the egfl7 gene is conserved across species. Egfl7 is expressed in endothelial progenitors and in endothelial cells during embryonic and neonatal development. Expression is down-regulated in adults but is still detectable in blood vessels of lung, heart and kidney. An up-regulation of egfl7 is observed in endothelial cells during vascular remodelling tissues, such as in reproductive organs during pregnancy, in regenerating endothelium following arterial injury, in atherosclerotic plaques, and in growing tumours. Expression of egfl7 has also been reported in primordial germ cells and in adult ovaries and testes and in neurons.

=== Expression in human tumours ===
Expression of egfl7 is endothelial cell-specific in physiological conditions, however it is aberrantly expressed by tumour cells in human cancers. In colorectal cancer, high levels of egfl7 correspond to tumours with higher pathologic stages and to the presence of lymph node metastases. Egfl7 is also over-expressed by tumour cells in human hepatocellular carcinoma and overexpression is significantly higher in tumours with multiple nodules, without capsules and with vein invasion. Levels of egfl7 are thus correlated with markers of metastasis and with poor prognosis. In glioma, egfl7 expression levels correlate with tumour grade. There is a correlation between expression of egfl7, cell proliferation and micro-vessel density.

== Function ==
Silencing (knockdown) of the egfl7 gene in the zebrafish inhibits vascular tubulogenesis and embryos have little or no blood circulation. They show pericardial oedema and haemorrhage. Their main blood vessels have no lumen. Although an initial gene inactivation report showed that mice which did not express egfl7 had various vascular defects, the observed phenotypes were later attributed to the concomitant inactivation of the miR-126 locus. To date, there is no phenotype associated with the loss of egfl7 in mice. Egfl7 knockout mice are phenotypically normal, viable and fertile, they have a normal vascular system. Over-expression of egfl7 specifically in endothelial cells in mice induces embryonic lethality with head haemorrhages, cardiac defects and head and yolk sac vasculature defects. In vitro, Egfl7 inhibits the formation of cord-like structure in embryonic bodies.

=== Cellular migration ===
In vitro, the Egfl7 protein inhibits human aortic smooth muscle cells migration stimulated by PDGF-BB but has no effects on cell proliferation, suggesting that Egfl7 plays a role in vessel maturation. In contrast, Egfl7 produced in conditioned medium is a chemo-attractant for rat vascular smooth muscle cells, mouse endothelial cells and for primary mouse embryonic fibroblasts in vitro. In vitro, egfl7 knockdown in HUVEC inhibits migration, probably by blocking the Notch pathway, although other groups reported that Egfl7 has no effect on HUVEC migration. Suppression of egfl7 expression inhibits the migration of hepatocellular carcinoma cells through an EGFR/FAK pathway. In vivo, egfl7 knockdown expression in hepatocellular carcinoma cells decreases the number of intra-hepatic and pulmonary metastases. In mice, inhibition of egfl7 in hepatocellular carcinoma cells decrease tumour growth and micro-vessel density. Over-expression of Egfl7 in tumour cells implanted in mice increases tumour growth and metastasis. Within the tumours, Egfl7 increases micro-vessel density, hypoxia, necrosis and vascular permeability.

=== Inhibition of elastogenesis ===
Egfl7 is a natural negative regulator of vascular elastogenesis. It interacts with and inhibits the catalytic activity of LOX, preventing the crosslink of tropoelastin molecules into mature insoluble elastin.

=== Inhibition of Notch pathway ===
Egfl7 interacts with the four Notch receptors, with Dll4, but not with jagged1. Moreover, recombinant Egfl7 competes with jagged1 or jagged2 proteins for their interaction with Notch1. Egfl7 knockdown stimulates the Notch pathway and Egfl7 over-expression inhibits the Notch pathway in HUVEC and neural stem cells.

=== Inhibition of leukocyte adhesion proteins ===
Treatment with Egfl7 inhibits the hypoxia/re-oxygenation-induced ICAM-1 expression, NF-κB nuclear translocation and decrease of IκBα expression in human coronary artery endothelial cells (HCAEC). HCAEC treatment with recombinant egfl7 protein inhibits neutrophils adhesion onto HCAEC and NF-κB DNA-binding activity induced by calcineurin inhibition, a cornerstone of immuno-suppressive therapy after heart transplantation. Egfl7 promotes tumour escape from immunity by repressing leukocyte adhesion molecules of tumor blood vessel endothelial cells. Endothelial cells from mice tumours over-expressing Egfl7 express much less ICAM-1, VCAM-1 and E-selectin than control tumours. Consequently, tumours over-expressing Egfl7 are much less infiltrated by immune cells. In vitro, egfl7 knockdown in HUVEC promotes expression of ICAM-1, VCAM-1 and E-selectin, and enhances the adhesion of Jurkat cells on these cells.
