= EMI (disambiguation) =

EMI was a British music and electronics company.

EMI may refer to:

== Arts and entertainment ==
- EMI Music Publishing
- EMI Records, a record label
- EMI Films, a British film production and distribution company
- EMI (film), a 2008 Bollywood film
- "E.M.I." (song), a song from the 1977 Sex Pistols album Never Mind the Bollocks, Here's the Sex Pistols
- Escape from Monkey Island, a computer game

== Education ==
- English-medium education, also known as English as a Medium of Instruction
- EMI schools, in Hong Kong, schools that use English as a Medium of Instruction (i.e. teach in English)
- Extended matching items, a type of examination method
- Mohammadia School of Engineering (École Mohammadia d'Ingénieurs, abbreviated EMI), in Rabat, Morocco

== Finance ==
- Electronic Money Institution, an undertaking that has been authorised to issue e-money
- Equated monthly installment, for repayment of a loan
- European Monetary Institute, a financial institution

== Science and technology ==
- EMI (protocol), a short message service center protocol
- EMI domain, a protein domain
- Electromagnetic induction
- Electromagnetic interference

=== Computing ===
- European Middleware Initiative
- Experiments in Musical Intelligence, a computer program for generating musical scores
- External memory interface, a bus protocol for communication with integrated circuits

== Other uses ==
- Emi, a common feminine Japanese given name and surname
- EMI (cycling team), a defunct Italian professional cycling team
- Emergency Management Institute, of the United States Federal Emergency Management Agency
- Emirau Airport in Papua New Guinea
