= OCC-1 =

Protein-coding gene in Homo sapiens

C12orf75

Identifiers
- Aliases: C12orf75, AGD3, OCC-1, OCC1, chromosome 12 open reading frame 75
- External IDs: MGI: 1917034; HomoloGene: 136238; GeneCards: C12orf75; OMA:C12orf75 - orthologs

Gene location (Human)
Chr.	Chromosome 12 (human)
Band	12q23.3	Start	105,235,290 bp
Band	12q23.3	End	105,396,097 bp

Gene location (Mouse)
Chr.	Chromosome 10 (mouse)
Band	10|10 C1	Start	83,558,729 bp
Band	10|10 C1	End	83,598,626 bp
RNA expression pattern
Bgee	Human / Mouse (ortholog); Top expressed in: Skeletal muscle tissue of rectus abdominis; seminal vesicula; stromal cell of endometrium; popliteal artery; tibial arteries; right coronary artery; islet of Langerhans; Descending thoracic aorta; ascending aorta; bronchial epithelial cell / Top expressed in: hand; morula; neural tube; dentate gyrus of hippocampal formation granule cell; external carotid artery; adrenal gland; embryo; blastocyst; placenta; arcuate nucleus; More reference expression data
BioGPS	n/a
Orthologs
Species	Human	Mouse
Entrez	387882	69784
Ensembl	ENSG00000235162	ENSMUSG00000087651
UniProt	Q8TAD7	P0C913
RefSeq (mRNA)	NM_207376; NM_001145199	NM_001145198
RefSeq (protein)	NP_001138671	NP_001138670
Location (UCSC)	Chr 12: 105.24 – 105.4 Mb	Chr 10: 83.56 – 83.6 Mb
PubMed search
- Wikidata
View/Edit Human	View/Edit Mouse

OCC-1 (overexpressed in colon carcinoma-1) is a protein, which in humans is encoded by the gene C12orf75. The gene is approximately 40,882 bp long and encodes 63 amino acids. OCC-1 is ubiquitously expressed throughout the human body. OCC-1 has shown to be overexpressed in various colon carcinomas. Novel splice variant of this gene was also detected in various human cancer types; in addition to encoding a novel smaller protein (51 amino acids), OCC-1 gene produces a non-protein coding RNA splice variant lncRNA (called OCC-D variant).

== Gene ==
Location and size: C12orf75 is found along the plus strand of chromosome 12 (12q23.3). The gene is 40,882 bp long with the genomic sequence beginning at 105,330,636 bp and ends at 105,371,518 bp. C12orf75 contains 6 exons and is flanked by KCCAT198 (renal clear cell carcinoma-associated transcript 198).

== mRNA ==
C12orf75 encodes several transcripts of mRNA that the longest one is 1386 bp. The mature mRNA of this splice variant contains six exons.

== Structure ==
=== Primary ===
OCC-1 protein is 63 amino acids long and has a molecular weight of 6.4 kdal. OCC-1 contains an “opioid growth factor receptor repeat” (OGFr) motif from residue 8 to 27. OCC-1 is an acidic protein with an isoelectric point of OCC-1 is 6.6.

=== Secondary ===
The secondary structure of OCC-1 is a combination of multiple coils, a few α-helices, and few β-sheets. The Phyre 2 program 52% α-helices, 6% β-sheets, and 70% disordered. The predicted region β-sheet from residues 31 to 38 coincide with the α-helices and β-sheets regions predicted by other programs. OCC-1 is a soluble protein; according to the SOUSI program therefore there are no transmembrane domains.

=== Tertiary ===
Predicted folding by iTASSER is shown.

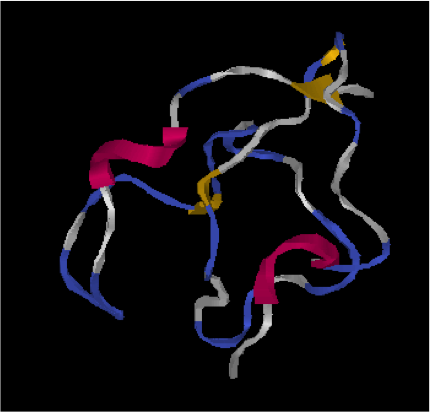
OCC-1

=== Post translational modifications ===
OCC-1 is predicted to undergo the post-translational modifications of O-glycosylation, phosphorylation, and myristoylation.

Type of Modification	Amino Acid Position	Impact on Protein
O-N-acetyleglucosamine	Ser6, Thr9, Ser10, Thr25, Ser54	Nucleocytoplasmic location, cell signaling
Phosphorylation	Ser28, Tyr42, Thr59	Conformational change, enzymatic functions of protein
Myristoylation	Gly2, Gly4, Gly40, Gly44	Allows for weak protein-protein and protein-lipid interactions

Subcellular location: The k-NN tool places OCC-1 in the nucleus of the cell with 65.2% certainty, 13% in the mitochondria, 8.7% in the vesicles of the secretory system, 4.3% cytoplasm, and 4.3% vacuole.

== Homology ==
Paralogs: OCC-1 has no known paralogs.

Orthologs: OCC-1 has been found in mammalia, reptilia, amphibian, aves, and actinopterygii. The gene is not found in plants, protists, fungi, archaea, or bacteria. The most distant ortholog is the Oryzias latipers or the Japanese rice fish, which diverged from the human gene approximately 436.5 million years ago.

Phylogeny: The phylogenetic tree to the right shows the evolution of OCC-1 among humans and the orthologs from the various taxa that contain OCC-1. The results of this phylogenetic tree follow in accordance with the predicted evolutionary history of animals on Earth.

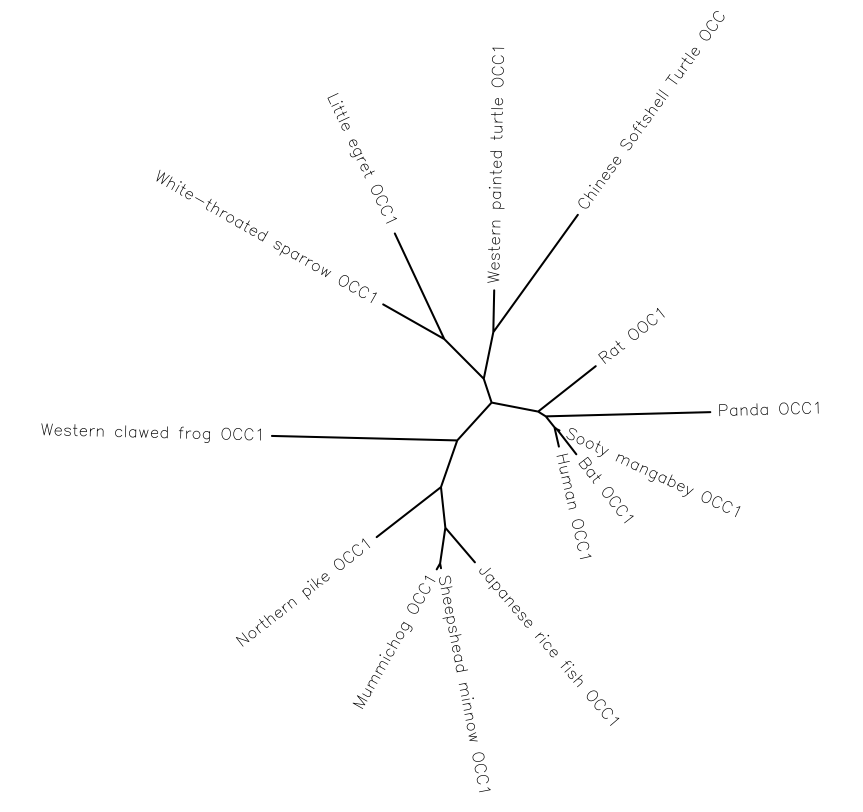
OCC-1 Phylogenetic Tree

== Expression ==
Expression level: OCC-1 has moderate to high expression throughout the body, therefore OCC-1 is ubiquitously expressed in humans; notably high expression in the kidney, skeletal muscle and pancreas and low expression in the heart. OCC-1 has shown to be overexpressed in various colon carcinomas. In regards to homologous expression, in situ hybridization data revealed that OCC-1 is expressed in the primary visual cortex of the macque, in an activity dependent manner.

Disease state expression: Profiles from NCBI UniGene show the expression of OCC-1 in adrenal tumors, chondrosarcoma, gastrointestinal tumors, kidney tumors, leukemia, liver tumors, prostate cancer, soft tissue/muscle tissue tumors, and uterine tumors.

== Regulation of expression ==
Promoter: The promoter of OCC-1 is GXP_4407929 and 601 bp in length. The promoter can be found on the plus strand and begins at 105234790 bp and ends at 105235390 bp.

== Interacting proteins ==
OCC-1 is shown to interact with HRG4, ELAVL1, c-REL, and IRS4. ELAVL1 functions to stabilized mRNA for gene expression. C-REL is involved in lymphoid and cell growth/survival, with a specific presence in T cell malignancies and cancer. HRG4 plays a role in signal transduction and trafficking sensory neurons and is located primarily in the retina, which relates to the discovery of expression in the brain of the macque through in situ hybridization data. IRS4 functions as interface between growth factor receptors consisting of tyrosine kinase activity, such as insulin receptors. IRS4 also is involved with the IGF1R mitogenic signaling pathway.

== Clinical significance ==
OCC-1 has shown to be overexpressed in multiple colon carcinomas.
