= Mir-126 =

mir-126
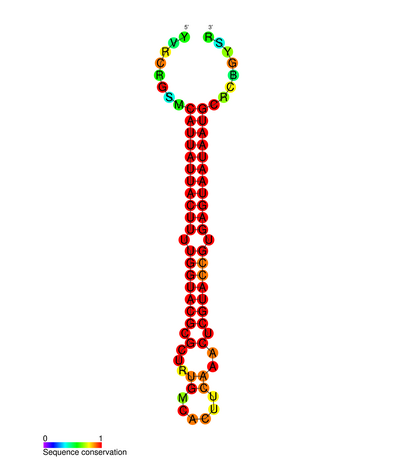
- miR-126 precursor secondary structure and sequence conservation.

Identifiers
- Symbol: mir-126
- Rfam: RF00701
- miRBase family: MIPF0000115
- OMIM: 611767

Other data
- RNA type: microRNA
- Domain: Eukaryota
- SO: SO:0001244
- PDB structures: PDBe

In molecular biology mir-126 is a short non-coding RNA molecule. MicroRNAs function to regulate the expression levels of other genes by several pre- and post-transcription mechanisms.

Mir-126 is a human microRNA that is expressed only in endothelial cells, throughout capillaries as well as larger blood vessels, and acts upon various transcripts to control angiogenesis.

== Genomic Location ==
miR-126 is located within the 7th intron of the EGFL7 gene which resides on human chromosome 9.

== mir-126* ==
mir-126* is the complementary strand to mir-126 which forms once the double stranded pri-miRNA is cleaved and the two strands denature, separating. mir-126* is less abundantly found in organisms than mir-126 and fewer roles in regulating gene expression have been identified. However, mir-126* has recently been implicated in the silencing of prostein in non-endothelial cells. Prostein is able to be produced specifically in the prostate through the silencing of both mir-126* and EGFL7.

== Regulation of expression ==
mir-126 is regulated by the binding of two transcription factors: ETS1 and ETS2. Binding of these factors induce the transcription of the mir-126 pre-miRNA resulting in the formation of the hairpin pri-miRNA. Hairpin miRNA is targeted to Dicer for cleavage, producing mature mir-126 and mir-126* transcripts.

Epigenetic regulation of the host gene by accumulation of methylation and gene silencing nucleosomes reduces expression of intronic miRNA affecting. This has been observed in cancers which benefit from the silencing of both EGFL7 and mir-126, resulting in neither being expressed.

Only one Single-nucleotide polymorphism within mir-126 has been identified. A change to the 24th base prevents the processing of the pri-miRNA into the mature miRNA, reducing the suppression of the various targets of mir-126. The frequency of the SNP varies between different ethnic backgrounds and potentially is related to the differential acquisition of human disease.

== Targets of mir-126 ==
miRNA binds to target sequences reducing the expression of the target gene. miRNA can bind either directly to DNA preventing transcription or to transcribed mRNA preventing translation and directing the mRNA for degradation. One of the main targets of mir-126 is the host gene EGFL7. Transcription of both occur, however mature mir-126 binds to a complementary sequence within EGFL7 preventing translation of the mRNA resulting in a decrease of EGFL7 protein levels. EGFL7 is known to be involved in cell migration and blood vessel formation, making EGFL7 and mir-126 opportune targets for disease, such as cancers, which require the continual formation of blood vessels to supply the tumour with nutrients and cell migration pathways to mediate tissue invasion.

- CRK, a protein involved in intracellular signal pathways involved in regulating cellular adhesion, proliferation, migration and invasion.
- TOM1 a negative regulator of the IL-1beta and TNF-alpha signalling pathways.
- Production of CXCL12, a chemokine, is regulated by mir-126.
- POU3F1, a factor required for the activation of the transcription factor PU.1. PU.1 negatively regulates GATA3 expression, altering the response of the T helper 2 cells.
- VEGF-A protein production is reduced as mir-126 binds to the 3' untranslated region of the VEGF-A mRNA.
- IRS-1 inhibiting the cell cycle from progressing from G_{0}/G_{1}into S phase.
- HOXA9, mir-126 modulates HOXA9 expression in haematopoietic cells. HOX genes are important developmental regulatory genes.

== Involvement in homeostasis ==
Tissue repair and maintenance are important parts of the life cycle of an organism, cells and tissues must remain in homeostasis to ensure survival. This includes controlled cell death and responses to wounds. During apoptosis cell death, cells release apoptotic bodies containing paracrine signals to neighbouring cells. In endothelial cells, mir-126 is also released with in these bodies are upon absorption in a neighbouring cell induce the CXCL12 dependant vascular protection. CXCL12 binds the receptor CXCR4 actively counteracting apoptosis and recruiting progenitor cells to the site of injury.

== Involvement in disease ==
=== Cancer ===
mir-126 has been shown to be both a tumour suppressor and an oncogene depending on the type of cancer. Inhibition of cancer progression occurs through mir-126s negative control of proliferation, migration, invasion and cell survival, while mir-126 also may support cancer progression through the promotion of blood vessel formation and inflammation at the site of activation.

- mir-126 and mir126* are overexpressed in acute myeloid leukemia.
- mir-126 expression is reduced in colorectal cancer.
- mir-126 expression is reduced in gastric cancer.
- mir-126 expression is reduced in lung cancer cell lines.
- mir-126 expression is reduced in prostate cancer and bladder cancer.
- mir-126 expression is reduced in breast cancer. It also suppresses metastatic endothelial recruitment, angiogenesis and colonisation, through interaction with its target genes IGFBP2, PITPNC1, and MERTK.
- Increased expression of mir-126 inhibits cell proliferation of non-small cell lung carcinoma cells in vitro and prevents tumour growth through the targeting of EGFL7.

Recently, mir-126 has been used as a tumour marker in a non-invasive diagnostic testing method. Urine samples have been able to identify bladder cancer sufferers apart from those non-effected, as small RNAs are readily excreted through urine.

=== Diabetes ===
Low expression levels of many types of miRNA have been observed in type 2 diabetes including: mir-15a, mir-20b, mir-21, mir-124, mir-126, mir-191, mir-197, mir-223, mir-320 and mir-486. Increased expression of mir-28-3p has also been observed. The consequence of misregulation of these miRNAs has not been fully elucidated, however mir-126 has been shown to decrease in expression in response to high glucose levels. The decrease of mir-15a, mir-29b, mir-126 and mir-223 proceedes the manifestation of the disease, making these transcripts a possible target for diagnostic testing for type 2 diabetes.

=== Cystic fibrosis ===
Comparisons of cystic fibrosis against non-cystic fibrosis airway epithelial cells shows that various miRNAs are differentially regulated in response to the disease. mir-126 is suspected to play a role in regulating the innate immune responses within Cystic Fibrosis affected lungs.

=== Allergic asthma ===
mir-126 increases the immune response to certain antigens resulting in overstimulation of the immune system and allergic asthma. T Helper 2 Cells are affected by mir-126 through a complicated interaction pathway, an increase in mir-126 results in an increase of the response of T Helper 2 Cells.

== See also ==
- MicroRNA
- EGFL7
