= IFT88 =

Protein-coding gene in the species Homo sapiens

Identifiers
- Aliases: IFT88, D13S1056E, DAF19, TG737, TTC10, hTg737, intraflagellar transport 88
- External IDs: OMIM: 600595; MGI: 98715; GeneCards: IFT88

Gene location (Human)
Chr.	Chromosome 13 (human)
Band	13q12.11	Start	20,567,138 bp
Band	13q12.11	End	20,691,444 bp

Gene location (Mouse)
Chr.	Chromosome 14 (mouse)
Band	14 C3|14 30.1 cM	Start	57,661,519 bp
Band	14 C3|14 30.1 cM	End	57,755,393 bp
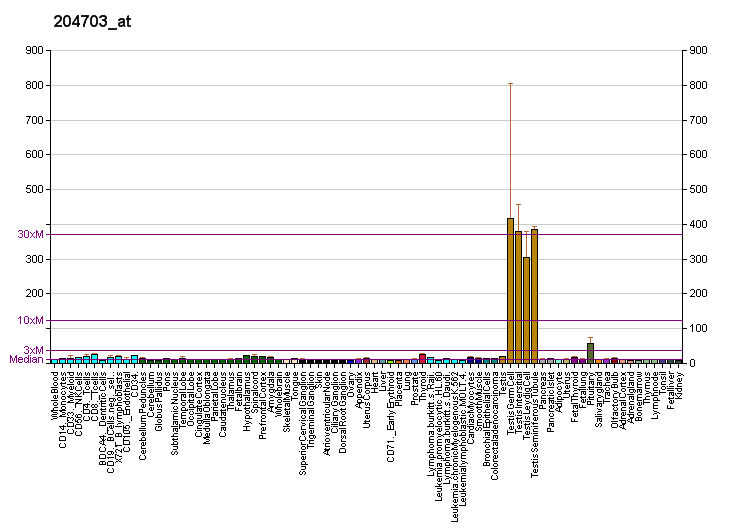
RNA expression pattern
Bgee	Human / Mouse (ortholog); Top expressed in: bronchial epithelial cell; sperm; left testis; right testis; right uterine tube; mucosa of paranasal sinus; caput epididymis; tibia; Achilles tendon; testicle / Top expressed in: spermatocyte; Ileal epithelium; lactiferous gland; choroid plexus of fourth ventricle; perirhinal cortex; entorhinal cortex; spermatid; CA3 field; tail of embryo; tracheobronchial tree; More reference expression data
BioGPS	More reference expression data
Gene ontology
Molecular function	protein binding; kinesin binding
Cellular component	intraciliary transport particle B; cytoplasm; cell projection; ciliary tip; motile cilium; cytoskeleton; centriole; cilium; ciliary basal body; centrosome; sperm flagellum; ciliary base; non-motile cilium; microtubule organizing center
Biological process	regulation of cilium assembly; regulation of autophagosome assembly; cilium assembly; cell projection organization; intraciliary transport involved in cilium assembly; kidney development; inner ear receptor cell stereocilium organization; non-motile cilium assembly; intraciliary transport
Sources:Amigo / QuickGO
Orthologs
Databases	NCBI: entry; OMA: entry
Species	Human	Mouse
Entrez	8100	21821
Ensembl	ENSG00000032742	ENSMUSG00000040040
UniProt	Q13099	Q61371
RefSeq (mRNA)	NM_006531; NM_175605; NM_001318491; NM_001318493; NM_001353565 NM_001353566; NM_001353567; NM_001353568; NM_001353569; NM_001353570; NM_001353571; NM_001353572; NM_001353573; NM_001353574; NM_001353575; NM_001353576; NM_001353577; NM_001353578; NM_001353579	NM_009376
RefSeq (protein)	NP_001305420; NP_001305422; NP_006522; NP_783195; NP_001340494 NP_001340495; NP_001340496; NP_001340497; NP_001340498; NP_001340499; NP_001340500; NP_001340501; NP_001340502; NP_001340503; NP_001340504; NP_001340505; NP_001340506; NP_001340507; NP_001340508	NP_033402; NP_001391322; NP_001391323; NP_001391324; NP_001391325 NP_001391326
Location (UCSC)	Chr 13: 20.57 – 20.69 Mb	Chr 14: 57.66 – 57.76 Mb
PubMed search
- Wikidata
View/Edit Human	View/Edit Mouse

Intraflagellar transport protein 88 homolog is a protein that is encoded by the IFT88 gene.

== Function ==
This gene encodes a member of the tetratrico peptide repeat (TPR) family. Mutations of a similar gene in mouse can cause polycystic kidney disease. Two transcript variants encoding distinct isoforms have been identified for this gene. In 2012 a mutation was found to be responsible for a novel form of ciliopathy and anosmia in humans capable of remedy in mice by adenoviral mediated gene therapy.

== Interactions ==
IFT88 has been shown to interact with BAT2 and WDR62. WDR62 is required for IFT88 localization to the cilia basal body and the cilia axoneme.
