= SLC45A3 =

Protein found in humans

Identifiers
- Aliases: SLC45A3, IPCA-2, IPCA-6, IPCA-8, IPCA6, PCANAP2, PCANAP6, PCANAP8, PRST, solute carrier family 45 member 3
- External IDs: OMIM: 605097; MGI: 1922082; GeneCards: SLC45A3

Gene location (Human)
Chr.	Chromosome 1 (human)
Band	1q32.1	Start	205,657,851 bp
Band	1q32.1	End	205,680,509 bp

Gene location (Mouse)
Chr.	Chromosome 1 (mouse)
Band	1|1 E4	Start	131,890,705 bp
Band	1|1 E4	End	131,910,707 bp
RNA expression pattern
Bgee	Human / Mouse (ortholog); Top expressed in: prostate; C1 segment; oocyte; nasal epithelium; secondary oocyte; mucosa of ileum; right lobe of liver; spleen; inferior ganglion of vagus nerve; mucosa of transverse colon / Top expressed in: secondary oocyte; primary oocyte; zygote; gastric mucosa; pyloric antrum; mucous cell of stomach; epithelium of stomach; egg cell; lumbar spinal ganglion; right kidney; More reference expression data
BioGPS	n/a
Gene ontology
Molecular function	sucrose:proton symporter activity; sugar transmembrane transporter activity
Cellular component	integral component of membrane; membrane; plasma membrane
Biological process	transmembrane transport; sucrose transport; positive regulation of glucose metabolic process; positive regulation of fatty acid biosynthetic process; regulation of oligodendrocyte differentiation; hexose transmembrane transport
Sources:Amigo / QuickGO
Orthologs
Databases	NCBI: entry; OMA: entry
Species	Human	Mouse
Entrez	85414	212980
Ensembl	ENSG00000158715	ENSMUSG00000026435
UniProt	Q96JT2	Q8K0H7
RefSeq (mRNA)	NM_033102	NM_001177628; NM_145977
RefSeq (protein)	NP_149093	NP_001171099; NP_666089
Location (UCSC)	Chr 1: 205.66 – 205.68 Mb	Chr 1: 131.89 – 131.91 Mb
PubMed search
- Wikidata
View/Edit Human	View/Edit Mouse

Solute carrier family 45 member 3 (SLC45A3), also known as prostate cancer-associated protein 6 or prostein, is a protein that in humans is encoded by the SLC45A3 gene.

SLC45A3 is expressed in a prostate-specific manner by normal tissues and at a significantly lower level in prostate tumor cell lines. Treatment of prostate cancer cell lines with androgens upregulates the expression of SLC45A3.

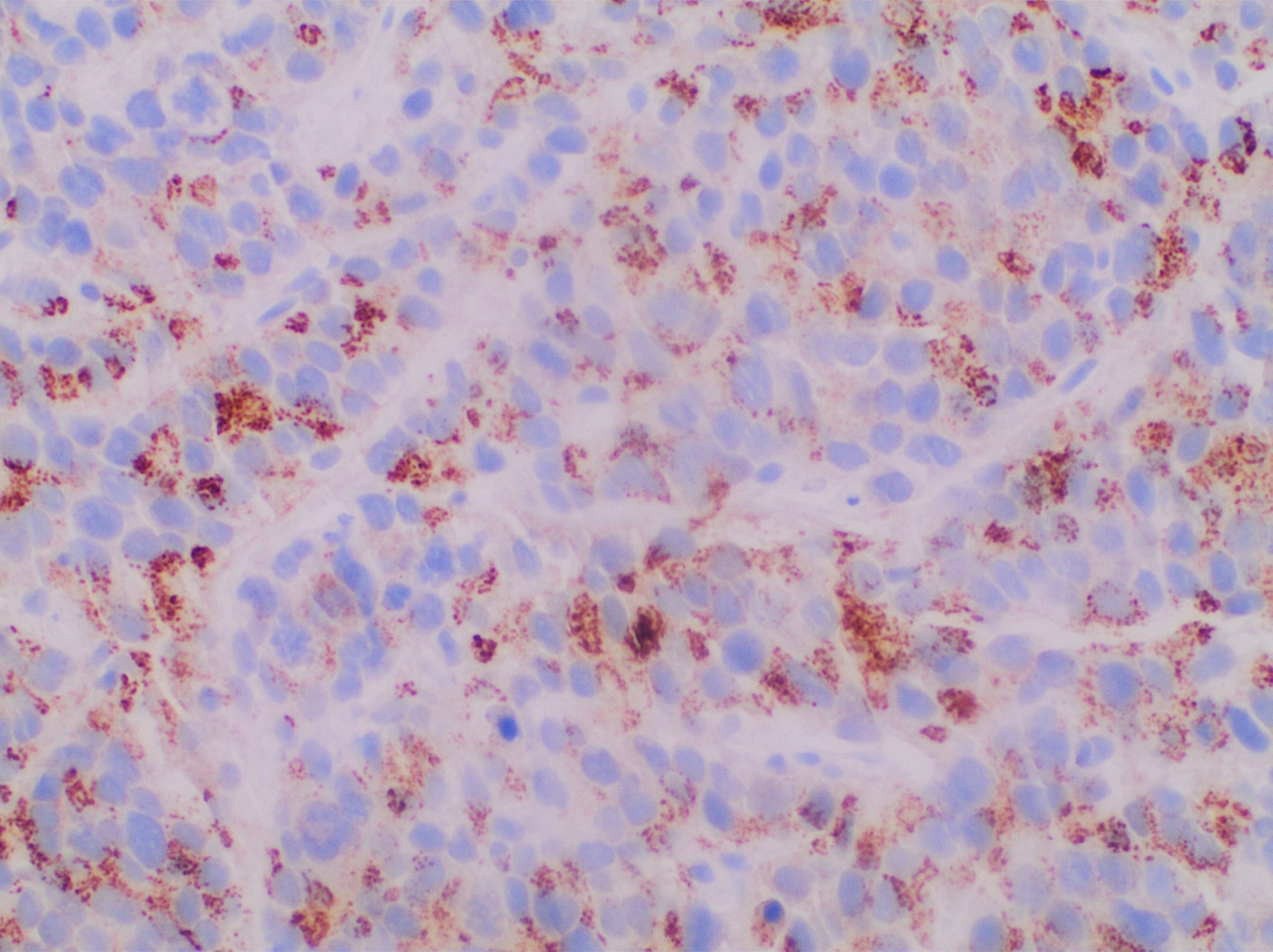
Immunohistochemistry of prostein in metastatic prostate adenocarcinoma to a lymph node, showing cytoplasmic staining

== Regulation ==
There is evidence that the expression of SLC45A3 is regulated by the microRNA mir-126*.
