= EMI domain =

Identifiers
- Symbol: EMI
- Pfam: PF07546
- InterPro: IPR011489
Available protein structures:
- PDB: IPR011489 PF07546 (ECOD; PDBsum)
- AlphaFold: IPR011489; PF07546

In molecular biology, the EMI domain, first named after its presence in proteins of the EMILIN family, is a small cysteine-rich protein domain of around 75 amino acids. The EMI domain is most often found at the N terminus of metazoan extracellular proteins that are forming or are compatible with multimer formation. It is found in association with other domains, such as C1q, laminin-type EGF-like, collagen-like, FN3, WAP, ZP or FAS1. It has been suggested that the EMI domain could be a protein-protein interaction module, as the EMI domain of EMILIN-1 was found to interact with the C1q domain of EMILIN-2.

The EMI domain possesses six highly conserved cysteine residues, which likely form disulphide bonds. Other key features of the EMI domain are the C-C-x-G-[WYFH] pattern, a hydrophobic position just preceding the first cysteine (Cys1) of the domain and a cluster of hydrophobic residues between Cys3 and Cys4. The EMI domain could be made of two sub-domains, the fold of the second one sharing similarities with the C-terminal sub-module characteristic of EGF-like domains.

Proteins known to contain an EMI domain include:

- Vertebrate Emilins, extracellular matrix glycoproteins.
- Vertebrate Multimerins, extracellular matrix glycoproteins.
- Vertebrate Emu proteins, which could interact with several different extracellular matrix components and serve to connect and integrate the function of multiple partner molecules.
- Vertebrate beta-IG-H3.
- Vertebrate osteoblast-specific factor 2 (OSF-2).
- Mammalian NEU1/NG3 proteins.
- Drosophila midline fasciclin.
- Caenorhabditis elegans ced-1, a transmembrane receptor that mediates cell corpse engulfment.
