= C1QBP =

Protein-coding gene in the species Homo sapiens

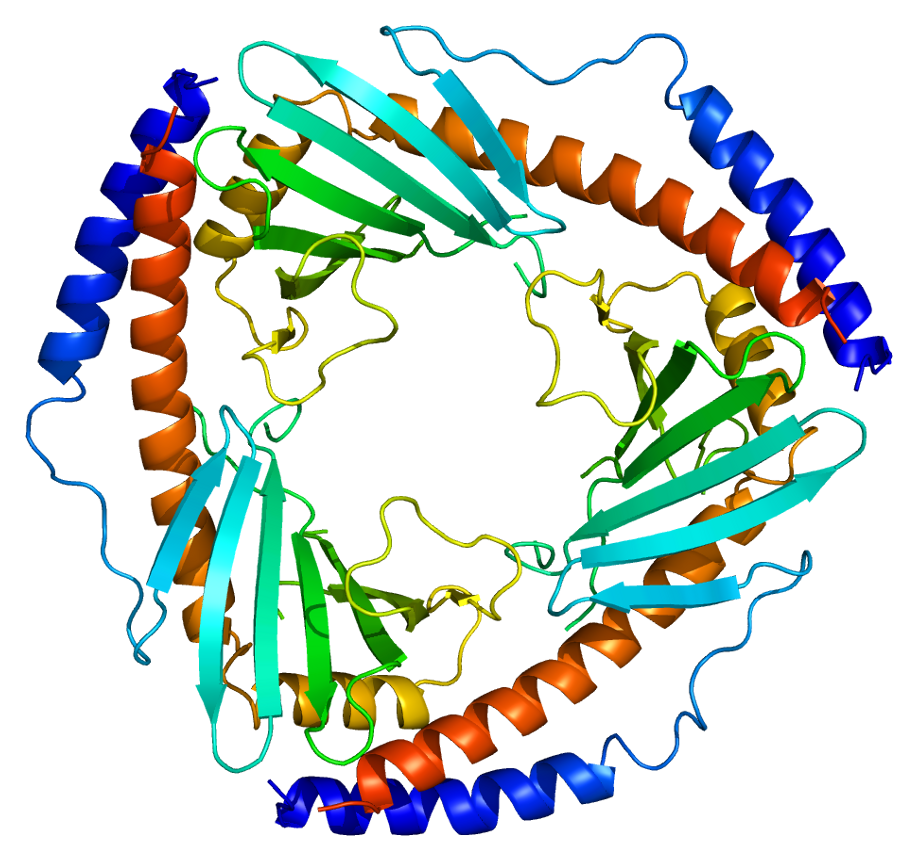

Identifiers
- Aliases: C1QBP, GHABP1, SF2p32, gC1Q-R, gC1qR, p32, complement component 1, q subcomponent binding protein, complement C1q binding protein, COXPD33, SF2AP32
- External IDs: OMIM: 601269; MGI: 1194505; GeneCards: C1QBP
Available structures
PDB	Ortholog search: PDBe RCSB
PDB	List of PDB id codes 1P32, 3RPX

Gene location (Human)
Chr.	Chromosome 17 (human)
Band	17p13.2	Start	5,432,777 bp
Band	17p13.2	End	5,448,830 bp

Gene location (Mouse)
Chr.	Chromosome 11 (mouse)
Band	11 B4|11 43.21 cM	Start	70,868,662 bp
Band	11 B4|11 43.21 cM	End	70,873,852 bp
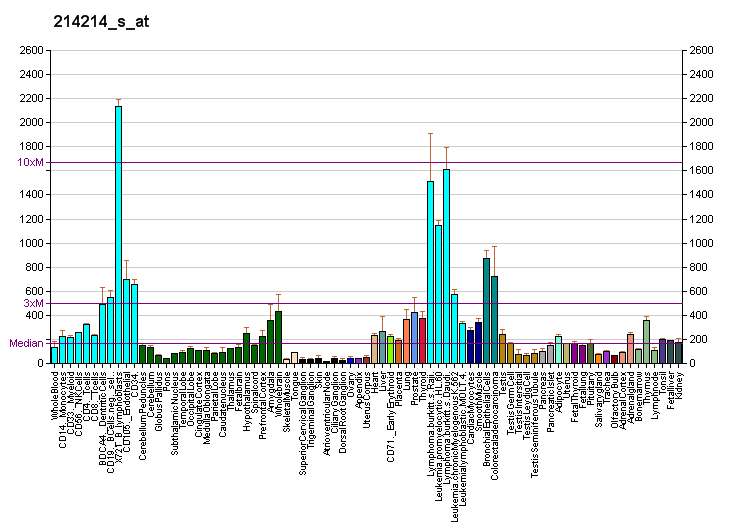

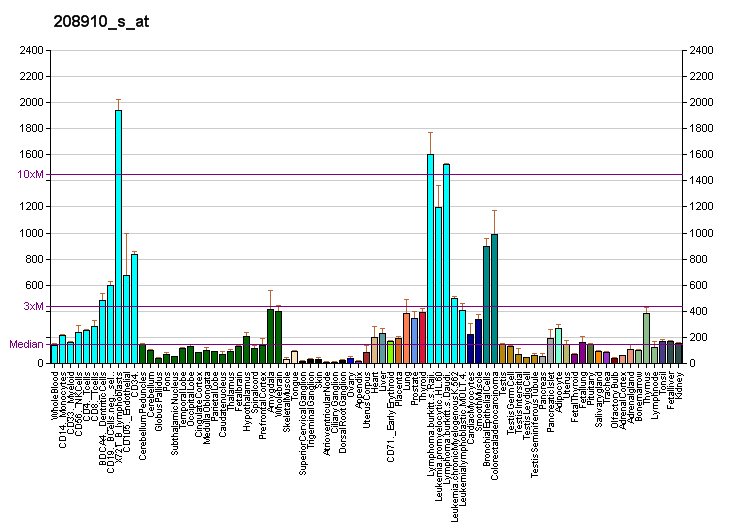
RNA expression pattern
Bgee	Human / Mouse (ortholog); Top expressed in: mucosa of transverse colon; right adrenal gland; rectum; right adrenal cortex; left adrenal gland; left adrenal cortex; islet of Langerhans; mucosa of esophagus; anterior pituitary; gastrocnemius muscle / Top expressed in: primitive streak; endothelial cell of lymphatic vessel; condyle; Paneth cell; hair follicle; fossa; fetal liver hematopoietic progenitor cell; otic placode; facial motor nucleus; medial ganglionic eminence; More reference expression data
BioGPS	More reference expression data
Gene ontology
Molecular function	transcription corepressor activity; transcription factor binding; protein binding; hyaluronic acid binding; kininogen binding; mitochondrial ribosome binding; mRNA binding; protein kinase C binding; complement component C1q complex binding; adrenergic receptor binding; translation activator activity
Cellular component	cytosol; extracellular region; cell surface; mitochondrial matrix; nucleolus; cytoplasm; membrane; mitochondrion; nucleus; extracellular space; plasma membrane; presynaptic active zone; presynapse; glutamatergic synapse; GABA-ergic synapse
Biological process	blood coagulation, intrinsic pathway; positive regulation of mitochondrial translation; negative regulation of interferon-gamma production; positive regulation of protein kinase B signaling; negative regulation of MDA-5 signaling pathway; regulation of transcription, DNA-templated; adaptive immune response; ribosome biogenesis; negative regulation of defense response to virus; immune system process; mRNA processing; negative regulation of transcription by RNA polymerase II; transcription, DNA-templated; positive regulation of trophoblast cell migration; positive regulation of substrate adhesion-dependent cell spreading; mature ribosome assembly; negative regulation of mRNA splicing, via spliceosome; immune response; RNA splicing; positive regulation of neutrophil chemotaxis; complement activation, classical pathway; positive regulation of apoptotic process; phosphatidylinositol 3-kinase signaling; innate immune response; viral process; positive regulation of dendritic cell chemotaxis; regulation of complement activation; negative regulation of RIG-I signaling pathway; positive regulation of cell adhesion; negative regulation of interleukin-12 production; apoptotic process
Sources:Amigo / QuickGO
Orthologs
Databases	NCBI: entry; OMA: entry
Species	Human	Mouse
Entrez	708	12261
Ensembl	ENSG00000108561	ENSMUSG00000018446
UniProt	Q07021	O35658; Q8R5L1
RefSeq (mRNA)	NM_001212	NM_007573
RefSeq (protein)	NP_001203	NP_031599
Location (UCSC)	Chr 17: 5.43 – 5.45 Mb	Chr 11: 70.87 – 70.87 Mb
PubMed search
- Wikidata
View/Edit Human	View/Edit Mouse

Complement component 1 Q subcomponent-binding protein, mitochondrial is a protein that in humans is encoded by the C1QBP gene.

The human complement subcomponent C1q associates with C1r and C1s in order to yield the first component of the serum complement system. The protein encoded by this gene is known to bind to the globular heads of C1q molecules and inhibit C1 activation. This protein has also been identified as the p32 subunit of pre-mRNA splicing factor SF2, as well as a hyaluronic acid-binding protein.

== Protein subunit ==
C1QBP is 282 amino acid in length and has three homologous subunit with its N-terminal 73 amino acid residues cleaved off to produce mature C1QBP. C1QBP appears as a monomer around 33 kDa on SDS-PAGE gel under both reducing and nonreducing condition but migrates as a trimer on size-exclusion chromatography (gel filtration).

== Protein structure ==
The crystal structure of C1QBP at 2.25 Å resolution shows a homotrimeric ring displaying symmetry. The individual subunits are held together by noncovalent interactions and forms a doughnut shaped quaternary structure with a central cavity of 20 Å in diameter. Each Subunit of C1QBP has seven β-strand (β1- β7) and three α-helices (α1- α3). C1QBP is negatively charged on its soluble face while the membrane face is predominantly positively charged.

== Interactions ==
C1QBP has been shown to interact with Protein kinase D1, BAT2, PRKCD, PKC alpha and Protein kinase Mζ. Other interacting partners of C1QBP include protein domains from pathogens such as bacteria, virus and plasmodium falciparum. Plasma proteins including fibrinogen, FXII and HK have been demonstrated to interact with C1QBP in a zinc dependent manner. Recently, a tumour homing peptide, LyP-1(CGNKRTRGC) has been shown to selectively bind to C1QBP in tumour expressing cells.
