= UBAP2L =

Protein-coding gene in humans

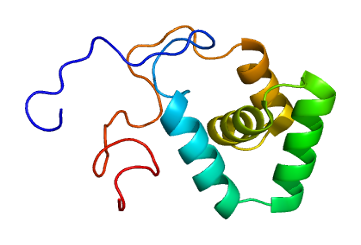

Identifiers
- Aliases: UBAP2L, NICE-4, NICE4, ubiquitin associated protein 2 like
- External IDs: OMIM: 616472; MGI: 1921633; GeneCards: UBAP2L

Gene location (Human)
Chr.	Chromosome 1 (human)
Band	1q21.3	Start	154,220,179 bp
Band	1q21.3	End	154,271,510 bp

Gene location (Mouse)
Chr.	Chromosome 3 (mouse)
Band	3 F1|3	Start	89,907,447 bp
Band	3 F1|3	End	89,959,935 bp
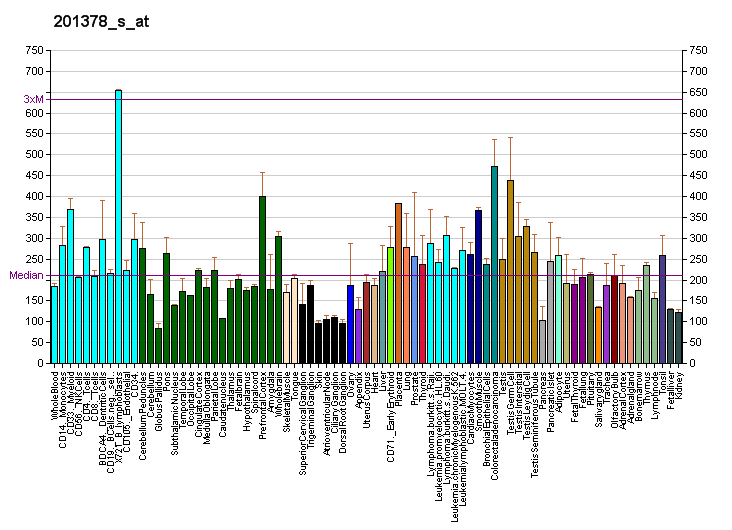

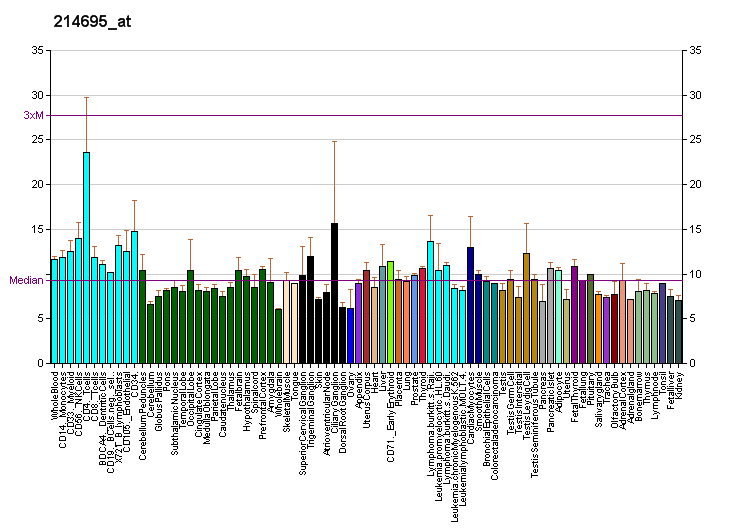

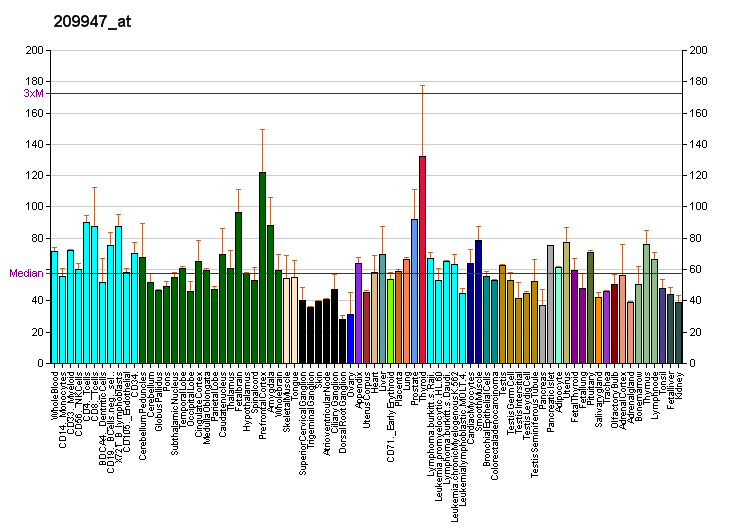
RNA expression pattern
Bgee	Human / Mouse (ortholog); Top expressed in: sural nerve; left ovary; right ovary; skin of abdomen; skin of leg; right lung; canal of the cervix; gastric mucosa; body of uterus; upper lobe of left lung / Top expressed in: tail of embryo; genital tubercle; spermatid; neural layer of retina; somite; yolk sac; spermatocyte; Rostral migratory stream; epiblast; ventricular zone; More reference expression data
BioGPS	More reference expression data
Gene ontology
Molecular function	protein binding; RNA binding
Cellular component	PcG protein complex; cytoplasm; nucleus
Biological process	hematopoietic stem cell homeostasis; binding of sperm to zona pellucida; positive regulation of gene expression
Sources:Amigo / QuickGO
Orthologs
Databases	NCBI: entry; OMA: entry
Species	Human	Mouse
Entrez	9898	74383
Ensembl	ENSG00000143569	ENSMUSG00000042520
UniProt	Q14157	Q80X50
RefSeq (mRNA)	NM_001127320; NM_001287815; NM_001287816; NM_014847; NM_001330730 NM_001375612; NM_001375614; NM_001375615; NM_001375616; NM_001375617; NM_001375618; NM_001375619; NM_001375620; NM_001375621; NM_001375622; NM_001375623; NM_001375624; NM_001375625; NM_001375626; NM_001375627; NM_001375628; NM_001375629; NM_001375630; NM_001375631	NM_001165983; NM_001165984; NM_001165985; NM_001165986; NM_001165987 NM_001165988; NM_028475; NM_153489; NM_001357307
RefSeq (protein)	NP_001120792; NP_001274744; NP_001274745; NP_001317659; NP_055662 NP_001362541; NP_001362543; NP_001362544; NP_001362545; NP_001362546; NP_001362547; NP_001362548; NP_001362549; NP_001362550; NP_001362551; NP_001362552; NP_001362553; NP_001362554; NP_001362555; NP_001362556; NP_001362557; NP_001362558; NP_001362559; NP_001362560	NP_001159455; NP_001159456; NP_001159457; NP_001159458; NP_001159459 NP_001159460; NP_082751; NP_705693; NP_001344236
Location (UCSC)	Chr 1: 154.22 – 154.27 Mb	Chr 3: 89.91 – 89.96 Mb
PubMed search
- Wikidata
View/Edit Human	View/Edit Mouse

Ubiquitin-associated protein 2-like is a protein that in humans is encoded by the UBAP2L gene.

== Interactions ==
UBAP2L has been shown to interact with BAT2.
