= FSCN3 =

Protein-coding gene in the species Homo sapiens

Identifiers
- Aliases: FSCN3, fascin actin-bundling protein 3
- External IDs: OMIM: 615800; MGI: 1890386; GeneCards: FSCN3

Gene location (Human)
| Chr. | Chromosome 7 (human) |
| Band | 7q32.1 | Start | 127,591,409 bp |
| Band | 7q32.1 | End | 127,602,144 bp |

Gene location (Mouse)
| Chr. | Chromosome 6 (mouse) |
| Band | 6|6 A3.3 | Start | 28,427,788 bp |
| Band | 6|6 A3.3 | End | 28,438,621 bp |
RNA expression pattern
| Bgee | Human / Mouse (ortholog); Top expressed in: sperm; left testis; right testis; testicle; granulocyte; gonad; muscle of thigh; cerebellar cortex; cerebellar hemisphere; prefrontal cortex / Top expressed in: seminiferous tubule; spermatid; blastocyst; embryo; spermatocyte; embryo; upper arm; medial ganglionic eminence; triceps brachii muscle; yolk sac; More reference expression data |
| BioGPS | n/a |
Gene ontology
| Molecular function | protein-macromolecule adaptor activity; actin binding; actin filament binding |
| Cellular component | cytoskeleton; actin cytoskeleton; cytoplasm; filamentous actin; ruffle; microvillus; lamellipodium; filopodium; growth cone; cell projection membrane |
| Biological process | spermatid development; actin filament organization; anatomical structure morphogenesis; establishment or maintenance of cell polarity; actin filament bundle assembly; cell migration |
Sources:Amigo / QuickGO
Orthologs
| Databases | NCBI: entry; OMA: entry |
| Species | Human | Mouse |
| Entrez | 29999 | 56223 |
| Ensembl | ENSG00000106328 | ENSMUSG00000029707 |
| UniProt | Q9NQT6 | Q9QXW4 |
| RefSeq (mRNA) | NM_020369 | NM_019569 |
| RefSeq (protein) | NP_065102 | NP_062515 |
| Location (UCSC) | Chr 7: 127.59 – 127.6 Mb | Chr 6: 28.43 – 28.44 Mb |
| PubMed search |
- Wikidata
| View/Edit Human | View/Edit Mouse |

Fascin-3 also known as testis fascin is a protein that in humans is encoded by the FSCN3 gene.

== See also ==
- Fascin
