= FSCN2 =

Protein-coding gene in the species Homo sapiens

Identifiers
- Aliases: FSCN2, RFSN, RP30, fascin actin-bundling protein 2, retinal
- External IDs: OMIM: 607643; MGI: 2443337; GeneCards: FSCN2

Gene location (Human)
Chr.	Chromosome 17 (human)
Band	17q25.3	Start	81,528,377 bp
Band	17q25.3	End	81,537,130 bp

Gene location (Mouse)
Chr.	Chromosome 11 (mouse)
Band	11|11 E2	Start	120,252,360 bp
Band	11|11 E2	End	120,258,994 bp
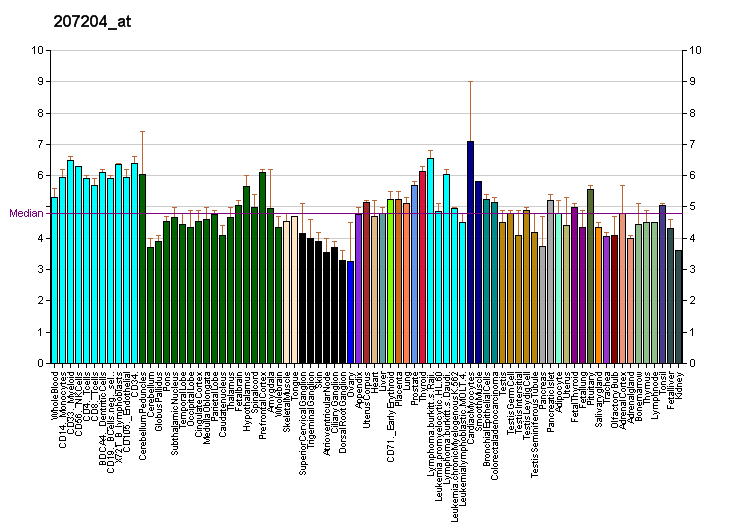
RNA expression pattern
Bgee	Human / Mouse (ortholog); Top expressed in: middle frontal gyrus; body of pancreas; right lobe of thyroid gland; left lobe of thyroid gland; stromal cell of endometrium; Descending thoracic aorta; ascending aorta; canal of the cervix; right uterine tube; body of uterus / Top expressed in: neural layer of retina; otolith organ; utricle; morula; retinal pigment epithelium; vestibular sensory epithelium; embryo; epithelium of lens; muscle of thigh; zygote; More reference expression data
BioGPS	More reference expression data
Gene ontology
Molecular function	actin binding; protein-macromolecule adaptor activity; actin filament binding; protein-containing complex binding
Cellular component	cell projection; cytoskeleton; stereocilium; actin cytoskeleton; filamentous actin; cytoplasm
Biological process	actin filament organization; anatomical structure morphogenesis; actin cytoskeleton organization; visual perception; actin filament bundle assembly; eye photoreceptor cell development; establishment or maintenance of cell polarity; cell migration
Sources:Amigo / QuickGO
Orthologs
Databases	NCBI: entry; OMA: entry
Species	Human	Mouse
Entrez	25794	238021
Ensembl	ENSG00000186765	ENSMUSG00000025380
UniProt	O14926	Q32M02
RefSeq (mRNA)	NM_001077182; NM_012418	NM_172802
RefSeq (protein)	NP_001070650; NP_036550	NP_766390
Location (UCSC)	Chr 17: 81.53 – 81.54 Mb	Chr 11: 120.25 – 120.26 Mb
PubMed search
- Wikidata
View/Edit Human	View/Edit Mouse

Fascin-2 is a protein that in humans is encoded by the FSCN2 gene.

This gene encodes a member of the fascin protein family. Fascins crosslink actin into filamentous bundles within dynamic cell extensions. This family member is proposed to play a role in photoreceptor disk morphogenesis. A mutation in this gene results in one form of autosomal dominant retinitis pigmentosa and macular degeneration. Multiple transcript variants encoding different isoforms have been found for this gene.
