= Fascin =

Actin bundling protein

fascin homolog 1
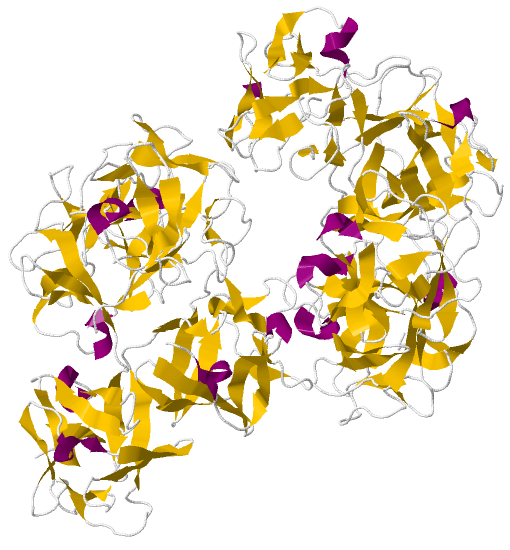
- Crystallographic structure of dimeric human fascin 1.

Identifiers
- Symbol: FSCN1
- Alt. symbols: SNL
- NCBI gene: 6624
- HGNC: 11148
- OMIM: 602689
- RefSeq: NM_003088
- UniProt: Q16658

Other data
- Locus: Chr. 7 p22
Search for
- Structures: Swiss-model
- Domains: InterPro

fascin homolog, retinal

Identifiers
- Symbol: FSCN2
- NCBI gene: 25794
- HGNC: 3960
- OMIM: 607643
- RefSeq: NM_012418
- UniProt: O14926

Other data
- Locus: Chr. 17 q25
Search for
- Structures: Swiss-model
- Domains: InterPro

fascin homolog 3, testicular

Identifiers
- Symbol: FSCN3
- NCBI gene: 29999
- HGNC: 3961
- RefSeq: NM_020369
- UniProt: Q9NQT6

Other data
- Locus: Chr. 7 q31.3
Search for
- Structures: Swiss-model
- Domains: InterPro

Fascins are a family of actin bundling proteins found in humans and many other organisms. More narrowly, fascin can also refer to the protein fascin 1, which in humans is encoded by the gene FSCN1.

== Species and tissue distribution ==
Fascin is a 54–58 kilodalton monomeric actin filament bundling protein originally isolated from sea urchin egg but also found in Drosophila and vertebrates, including humans. Fascin (from the Latin for bundle) is spaced at 11 nanometre intervals along the filament. The bundles in cross section are seen to be hexagonally packed, and the longitudinal spacing is compatible with a model where fascin cross-links at alternating 4 and 5 actins. It is calcium insensitive and monomeric. Three forms of fascin are found in vertebrates: Fascin1, widely found in the nervous system and elsewhere; fascin2 found in the retinal photoreceptor cells; fascin3, which is only found in the testes.

== Structure ==
Fascin is a structural protein found in mesenchyme, nervous, and retinal tissue and is used in the bundling of actin molecules.

The structure of human fascin has been determined to a resolution of 1.8 Å (PDBID 3LLP) and reveals an arrangement of four tandem beta-trefoil domains that form a two lobed structure with pseudo 2-fold symmetry. It is stabilized by a hydrophobic core and a hydrophilic surface since it is often found inside cell cytoplasm in the formation of filopodia.

== Function ==
Fascin binds beta-catenin, and colocalizes with it at the leading edges and borders of epithelial and endothelial cells. The role of Fascin in regulating cytoskeletal structures for the maintenance of cell adhesion, coordinating motility and invasion through interactions with signalling pathways is an active area of research especially from the cancer biology perspective. Fascin localizes to actin-rich protrusions at the cell surface called filopodia. Recent study shows that fascin also localizes to invadopodia, membrane protrusions formed at the adherent cell surface that facilitate extracellular matrix (ECM) invasion, this provide a potential molecular mechanism for how fascin increases the invasiveness of cancer cells since fascin expression is upregulated in a spectrum of cancers. Studies have also shown that Fascin plays a major role in immune suppression. T regulatory cell adhesion to antigen presenting dendritic cell causes sequestration of Fascin-1, an actin-bundling protein essential for immunological synapse formation, and skews Fascin-1–dependent actin polarization in antigen presenting dendritic cells toward the T reg cell adhesion zone. Although it is reversible upon T regulatory cell disengagement, this sequestration of essential cytoskeletal components causes a lethargic state of dendritic cells, leading to reduced T cell priming. This suggests Treg-mediated suppression of antigen presenting cells is a multi-step process. In addition to CTLA-4 CD80/CD86 interaction fascin dependent polarization of cytoskeleton towards dendritic cell Treg immune synapse play a pivotal role. In normal tissue, inflammation and the immune response would be limited by secretion of TGF-β. TGF-β on the one hand induces fascin expression, but on the other hand, restricts activity of transcription factor NF-κB. This results to limited fascin expression and allows tissue to rebuild epithelial barriers. In cancer, instead, TGF-β does not restrict NF-κB activity, and both can increase fascin expression, disrupting tissue structure and function.

== Clinical significance ==
Abnormal fascin expression or function has been implicated in breast cancer, colon cancer, esophageal squamous cell carcinoma, gallbladder cancer, pancreatic cancer, and prostate cancer. It is also helpful in identifying Hodgkin cells.
