= BAT2 =

Protein-coding gene in the species Homo sapiens

PRRC2A

Identifiers
- Aliases: PRRC2A, BAT2, D6S51, D6S51E, G2, proline rich coiled-coil 2A
- External IDs: OMIM: 142580; MGI: 1915467; HomoloGene: 10567; GeneCards: PRRC2A; OMA:PRRC2A - orthologs

Gene location (Human)
Chr.	Chromosome 6 (human)
Band	6p21.33	Start	31,620,715 bp
Band	6p21.33	End	31,637,771 bp

Gene location (Mouse)
Chr.	Chromosome 17 (mouse)
Band	17 B1|17 18.59 cM	Start	35,368,052 bp
Band	17 B1|17 18.59 cM	End	35,383,873 bp
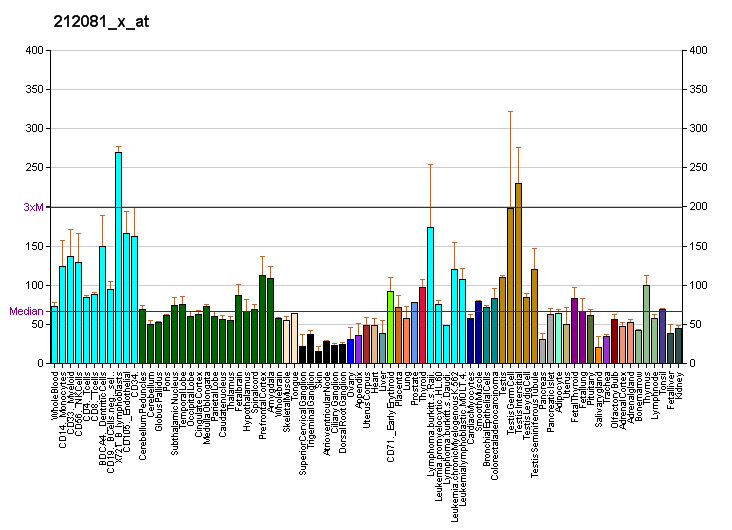

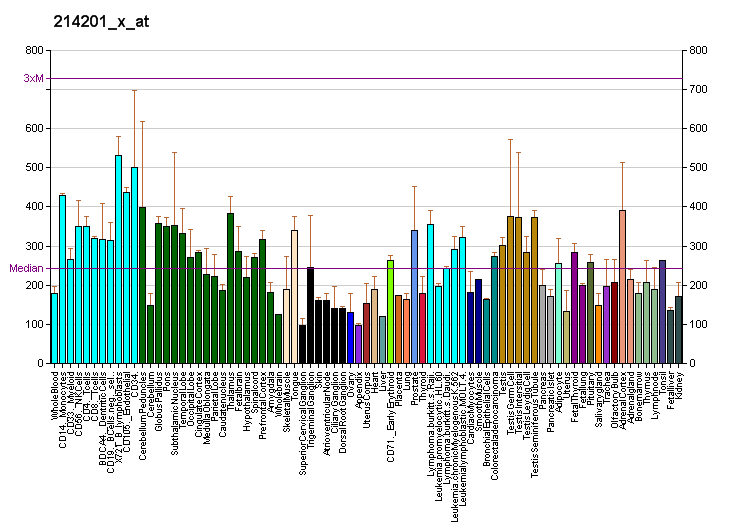

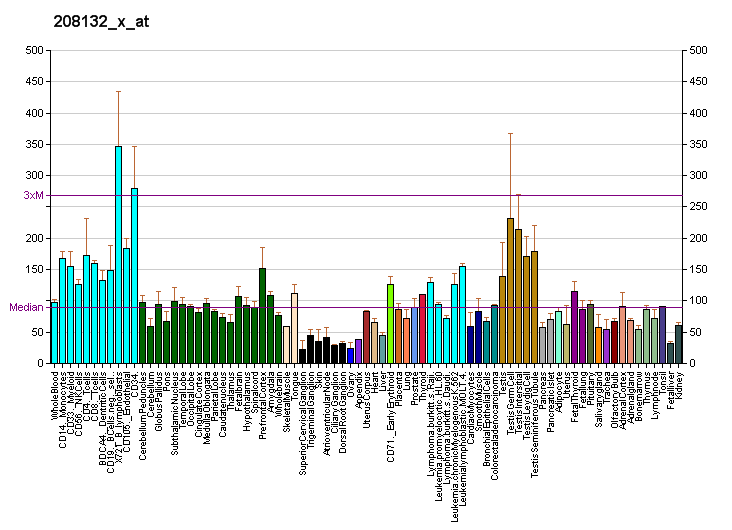
RNA expression pattern
Bgee	Human / Mouse (ortholog); Top expressed in: right testis; left testis; ventricular zone; pituitary gland; anterior pituitary; right hemisphere of cerebellum; right frontal lobe; ganglionic eminence; prostate; left uterine tube / Top expressed in: tail of embryo; ventricular zone; genital tubercle; superior frontal gyrus; lip; superior surface of tongue; gallbladder; dentate gyrus of hippocampal formation granule cell; granulocyte; neural layer of retina; More reference expression data
BioGPS	More reference expression data
Gene ontology
Molecular function	protein binding; RNA binding
Cellular component	extracellular exosome; membrane; nucleus; cytoplasm; nucleoplasm; cytosol; plasma membrane
Biological process	cell differentiation
Sources:Amigo / QuickGO
Orthologs
Species	Human	Mouse
Entrez	7916	53761
Ensembl	ENSG00000204469; ENSG00000206427; ENSG00000231825; ENSG00000231370; ENSG00000226618 ENSG00000225164; ENSG00000225748	ENSMUSG00000024393
UniProt	P48634	Q7TSC1
RefSeq (mRNA)	NM_004638; NM_080686	NM_001199044; NM_020027
RefSeq (protein)	NP_004629; NP_542417	NP_001185973; NP_064411
Location (UCSC)	Chr 6: 31.62 – 31.64 Mb	Chr 17: 35.37 – 35.38 Mb
PubMed search
- Wikidata
View/Edit Human	View/Edit Mouse

Large proline-rich protein BAT2 is a protein that in humans is encoded by the BAT2 gene.

== Function ==
A cluster of genes, BAT1-BAT5, has been localized in the vicinity of the genes for TNF alpha and TNF beta. These genes are all within the human major histocompatibility complex class III region. This gene has microsatellite repeats which are associated with the age-at-onset of insulin-dependent diabetes mellitus (IDDM) and possibly thought to be involved with the inflammatory process of pancreatic beta-cell destruction during the development of IDDM. This gene is also a candidate gene for the development of rheumatoid arthritis. There are two alternatively spliced transcripts encoding different isoforms described for this gene.

== Interactions ==
BAT2 has been shown to interact with:

- C1QBP,
- EIF3S6,
- HNRNPA1,
- IFT88,
- IMMT, and
- UBAP2L.
