= Mir-320 =

RNA molecule

mir-320
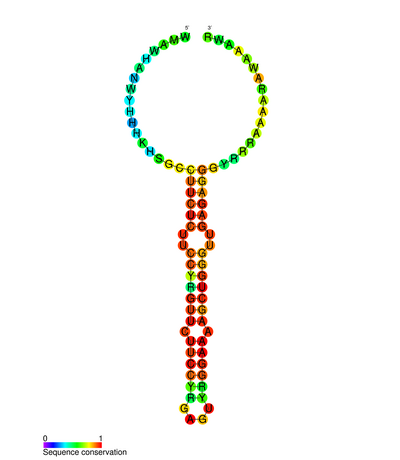
- Conserved secondary structure of mir-320

Identifiers
- Symbol: mir-320
- Rfam: RF00736
- miRBase family: MIPF0000163

Other data
- RNA type: microRNA
- Domain: Eukaryota;
- PDB structures: PDBe

In molecular biology mir-320 microRNA is a short RNA molecule. MicroRNAs function to regulate the expression levels of other genes by several mechanisms.

The biogenesis of miR-320 is different from the canonical microprocessor-dependent miRNAs. The pre-miR-320 is transcribed directly as a precursor microRNA hairpin and thus contains a 5′ m7G-cap.
