= RAB38 =

Protein-coding gene in the species Homo sapiens

Identifiers
- Aliases: RAB38, NY-MEL-1, rrGTPbp, member RAS oncogene family
- External IDs: OMIM: 606281; MGI: 1919683; GeneCards: RAB38
Enzyme activity
EC #	BRENDA	ExPASy	KEGG	MetaCyc
3.6.5.2	↗	↗	↗	↗

Gene location (Human)
Chr.	Chromosome 11 (human)
Band	11q14.2	Start	88,113,251 bp
Band	11q14.2	End	88,175,443 bp

Gene location (Mouse)
Chr.	Chromosome 7 (mouse)
Band	7 D3|7 49.19 cM	Start	88,079,481 bp
Band	7 D3|7 49.19 cM	End	88,140,780 bp
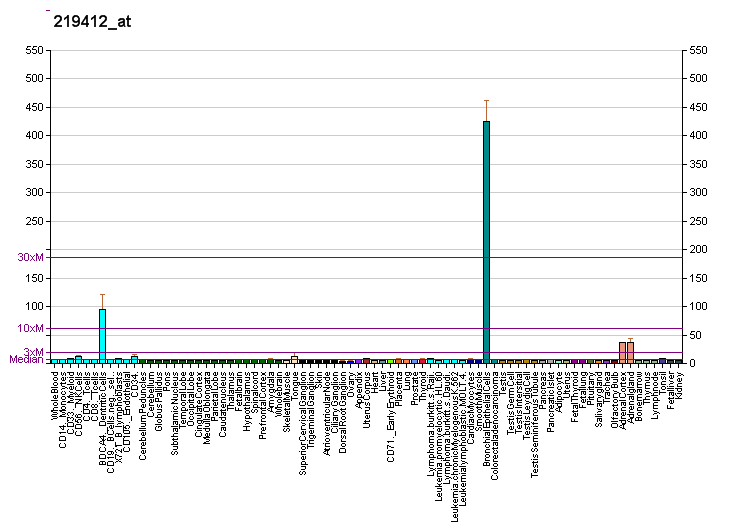
RNA expression pattern
Bgee	Human / Mouse (ortholog); Top expressed in: gingival epithelium; palpebral conjunctiva; skin of thigh; vulva; human penis; skin of abdomen; hair follicle; germinal epithelium; oral cavity; right adrenal cortex / Top expressed in: zygote; primary oocyte; secondary oocyte; molar; iris; epidermis; hair follicle; skin of external ear; skin of abdomen; cornea; More reference expression data
BioGPS	More reference expression data
Gene ontology
Molecular function	AP-2 adaptor complex binding; nucleotide binding; BLOC-2 complex binding; GTP binding; GTP-dependent protein binding; protein binding; AP-3 adaptor complex binding; AP-1 adaptor complex binding; GTPase activity
Cellular component	cytoplasm; vesicle; phagocytic vesicle membrane; Golgi apparatus; membrane; melanosome; plasma membrane; early endosome; phagocytic vesicle; endoplasmic reticulum; early endosome lumen; cytoplasmic vesicle; lysosome; mitochondrion; mitochondria associated membranes; cytosol; melanosome membrane; trans-Golgi network
Biological process	protein localization to membrane; platelet dense granule organization; organelle organization; phagosome acidification; endosome to melanosome transport; protein transport; melanosome assembly; mitochondrion organization; vesicle-mediated transport; small GTPase mediated signal transduction; post-translational protein modification; positive regulation of phosphatidylcholine biosynthetic process; intracellular protein transport; Rab protein signal transduction
Sources:Amigo / QuickGO
Orthologs
Databases	NCBI: entry; OMA: entry
Species	Human	Mouse
Entrez	23682	72433
Ensembl	ENSG00000123892	ENSMUSG00000030559
UniProt	P57729	Q8QZZ8
RefSeq (mRNA)	NM_022337	NM_028238
RefSeq (protein)	NP_071732; NP_071732.1	NP_082514
Location (UCSC)	Chr 11: 88.11 – 88.18 Mb	Chr 7: 88.08 – 88.14 Mb
PubMed search
- Wikidata
View/Edit Human	View/Edit Mouse

Ras-related protein Rab-38 is a protein that in humans is encoded by the RAB38 gene.

In melanocytic cells RAB38 gene expression may be regulated by MITF.
