= EMILIN1 =

Protein-coding gene in the species Homo sapiens

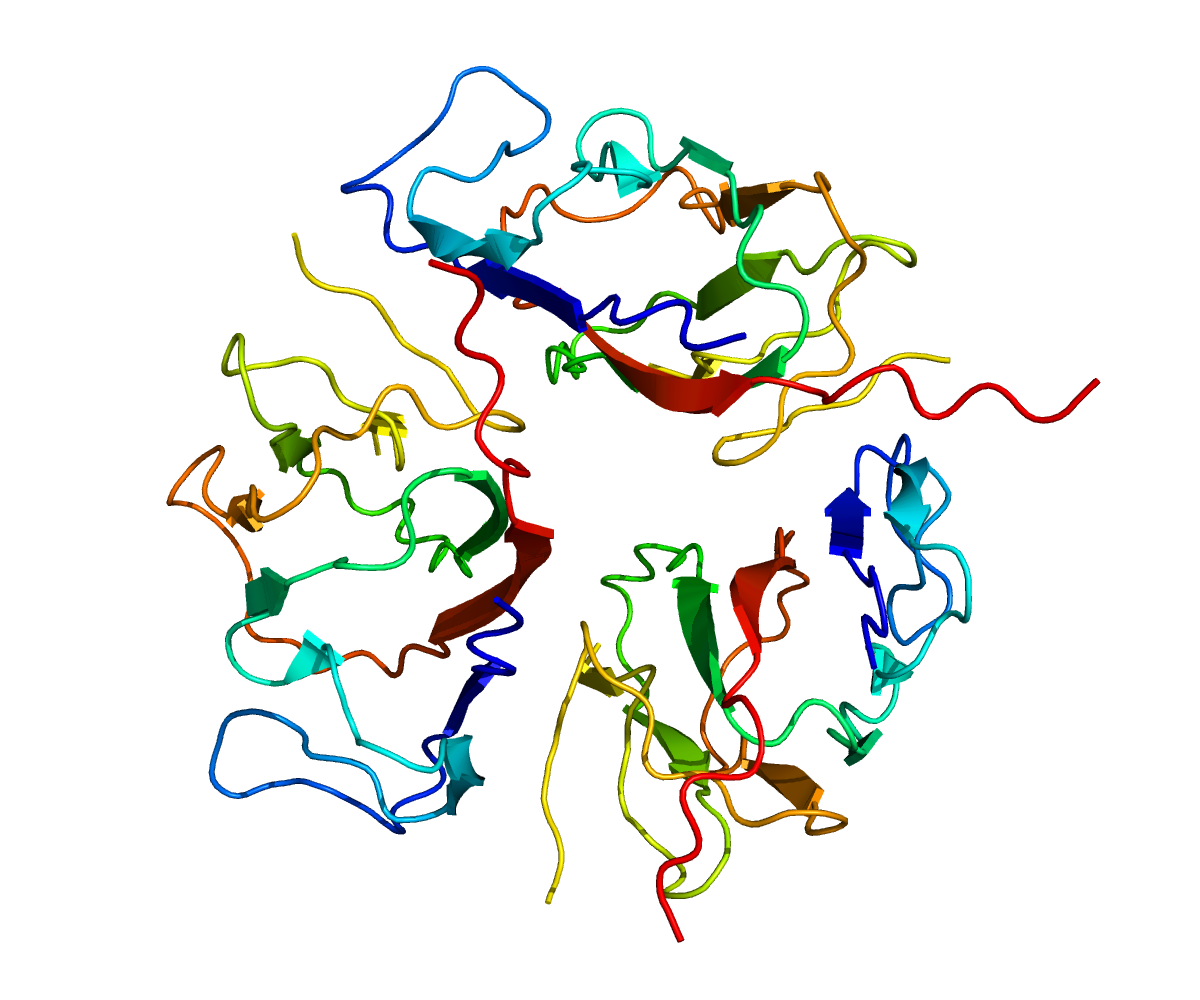

Identifiers
- Aliases: EMILIN1, EMI, EMILIN, gp115, elastin microfibril interfacer 1
- External IDs: OMIM: 130660; MGI: 1926189; GeneCards: EMILIN1
Available structures
PDB	Ortholog search: PDBe RCSB
PDB	List of PDB id codes 2KA3, 2OII

Gene location (Human)
Chr.	Chromosome 2 (human)
Band	2p23.3	Start	27,078,615 bp
Band	2p23.3	End	27,086,403 bp

Gene location (Mouse)
Chr.	Chromosome 5 (mouse)
Band	5|5 B1	Start	31,070,746 bp
Band	5|5 B1	End	31,078,621 bp
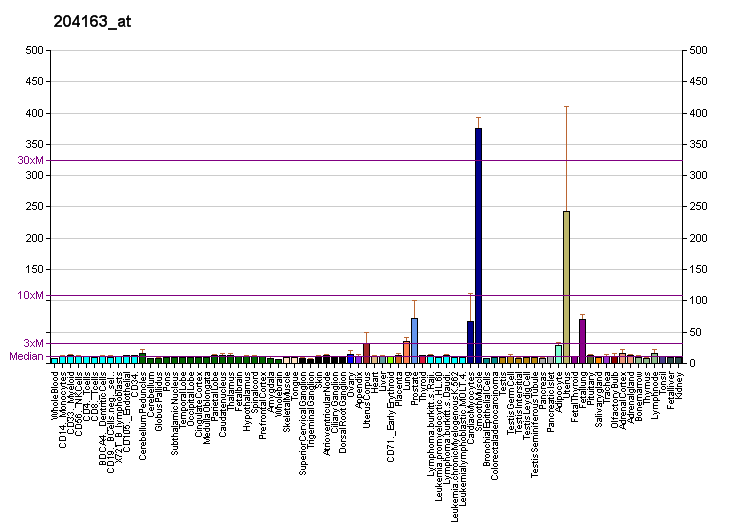
RNA expression pattern
Bgee	Human / Mouse (ortholog); Top expressed in: right coronary artery; body of uterus; left uterine tube; right ovary; muscle layer of sigmoid colon; ascending aorta; Descending thoracic aorta; left ovary; left coronary artery; stromal cell of endometrium / Top expressed in: glomerulus; glomerular basement membrane; yolk sac; body wall; calvaria; serosa of urinary bladder; granulocyte; right kidney; embryo; molar; More reference expression data
BioGPS	More reference expression data
Gene ontology
Molecular function	protein binding; extracellular matrix constituent conferring elasticity; identical protein binding; integrin binding involved in cell-matrix adhesion; extracellular matrix structural constituent
Cellular component	collagen; extracellular region; extracellular exosome; extracellular space; extracellular matrix; integrin alpha4-beta1 complex; EMILIN complex; collagen-containing extracellular matrix
Biological process	cell adhesion; cell-matrix adhesion; cell migration; protein homotrimerization; aortic valve morphogenesis; positive regulation of gene expression; negative regulation of gene expression; positive regulation of cell-substrate adhesion; negative regulation of angiogenesis; extracellular matrix organization; negative regulation of transforming growth factor beta receptor signaling pathway; negative regulation of vascular endothelial growth factor receptor signaling pathway; negative regulation of collagen biosynthetic process; elastic fiber assembly; negative regulation of cell activation; negative regulation of pathway-restricted SMAD protein phosphorylation; negative regulation of ERK1 and ERK2 cascade; positive regulation of extracellular matrix assembly; negative regulation of collagen fibril organization; negative regulation of macrophage migration
Sources:Amigo / QuickGO
Orthologs
Databases	NCBI: entry; OMA: entry
Species	Human	Mouse
Entrez	11117	100952
Ensembl	ENSG00000138080	ENSMUSG00000029163
UniProt	Q9Y6C2	Q99K41
RefSeq (mRNA)	NM_007046	NM_133918
RefSeq (protein)	NP_008977	NP_598679
Location (UCSC)	Chr 2: 27.08 – 27.09 Mb	Chr 5: 31.07 – 31.08 Mb
PubMed search
- Wikidata
View/Edit Human	View/Edit Mouse

Elastin microfibril interfacer 1 (EMILIN-1) is a protein that in humans is encoded by the EMILIN1 gene. It is the best characterized member of the EMILIN family of extracellular matrix glycoproteins.
