= FSCN1 =

Protein-coding gene in the species Homo sapiens

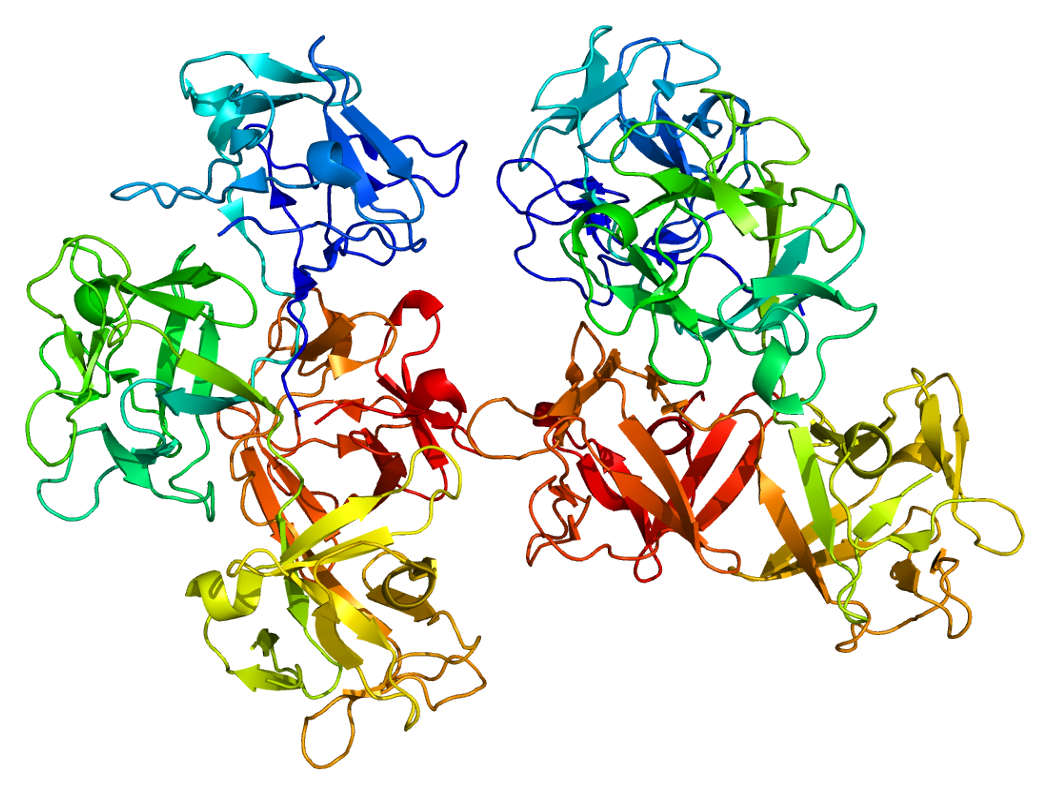

Identifiers
- Aliases: FSCN1, FAN1, HSN, SNL, p55, fascin actin-bundling protein 1
- External IDs: OMIM: 602689; MGI: 1352745; GeneCards: FSCN1
Available structures
PDB	Ortholog search: PDBe RCSB
PDB	List of PDB id codes 1DFC, 4GP0, 4GP3, 3P53, 4GOY, 4GOV, 3LLP

Gene location (Human)
Chr.	Chromosome 7 (human)
Band	7p22.1	Start	5,592,816 bp
Band	7p22.1	End	5,606,655 bp

Gene location (Mouse)
Chr.	Chromosome 5 (mouse)
Band	5 G2|5 81.84 cM	Start	142,946,098 bp
Band	5 G2|5 81.84 cM	End	142,958,940 bp
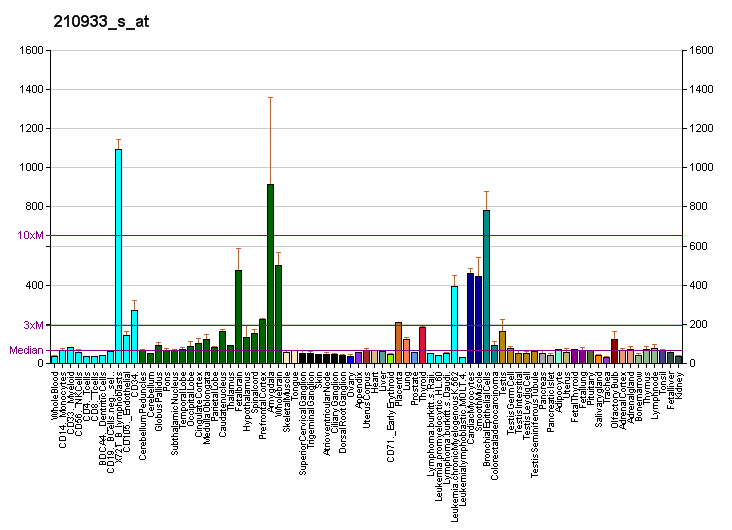

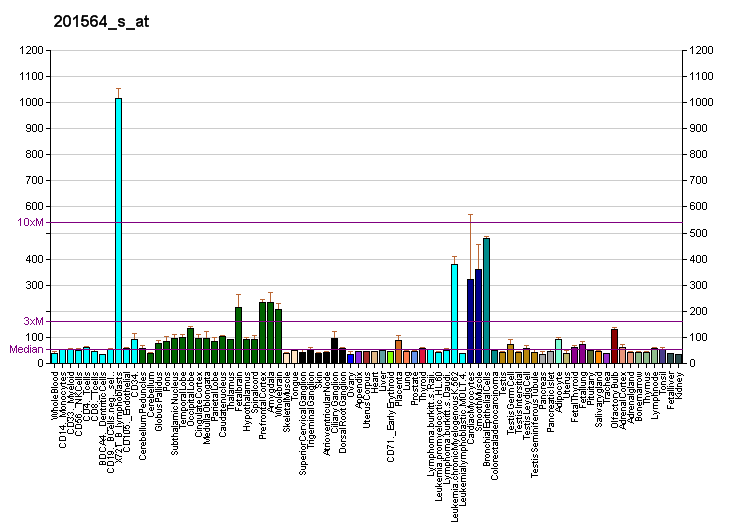
RNA expression pattern
Bgee	Human / Mouse (ortholog); Top expressed in: stromal cell of endometrium; ganglionic eminence; middle frontal gyrus; frontal pole; Brodmann area 10; C1 segment; ventricular zone; right frontal lobe; putamen; amygdala / Top expressed in: external carotid artery; internal carotid artery; abdominal wall; Rostral migratory stream; endothelial cell of lymphatic vessel; condyle; primitive streak; endocardial cushion; fossa; mandibular prominence; More reference expression data
BioGPS	More reference expression data
Gene ontology
Molecular function	protein-macromolecule adaptor activity; actin filament binding; protein binding; actin binding; RNA binding; cadherin binding
Cellular component	cytoplasm; cell projection; cell-cell junction; filopodium; ruffle; myelin sheath; stress fiber; microvillus; cell junction; microspike; cell projection membrane; actin cytoskeleton; podosome; extracellular exosome; cytoskeleton; growth cone; lamellipodium; filamentous actin; cytosol
Biological process	regulation of microvillus assembly; establishment of apical/basal cell polarity; regulation of actin cytoskeleton organization; actin filament organization; cell motility; positive regulation of podosome assembly; actin filament bundle assembly; positive regulation of extracellular matrix disassembly; cell-cell junction assembly; microspike assembly; cell population proliferation; positive regulation of lamellipodium assembly; cell migration; positive regulation of filopodium assembly; actin cytoskeleton organization; anatomical structure morphogenesis; establishment or maintenance of cell polarity; cytokine-mediated signaling pathway
Sources:Amigo / QuickGO
Orthologs
Databases	NCBI: entry; OMA: entry
Species	Human	Mouse
Entrez	6624	14086
Ensembl	ENSG00000075618	ENSMUSG00000029581
UniProt	Q16658	Q61553
RefSeq (mRNA)	NM_003088	NM_007984
RefSeq (protein)	NP_003079	NP_032010
Location (UCSC)	Chr 7: 5.59 – 5.61 Mb	Chr 5: 142.95 – 142.96 Mb
PubMed search
- Wikidata
View/Edit Human	View/Edit Mouse

Fascin is a protein that in humans is encoded by the FSCN1 gene.

== Interactions ==
FSCN1 has been shown to interact with Low affinity nerve growth factor receptor and PKC alpha.
