= IRS4 =

Protein-coding gene in the species Homo sapiens

Identifiers
- Aliases: IRS4, IRS-4, PY160, insulin receptor substrate 4, CHNG9
- External IDs: OMIM: 300904; MGI: 1338009; HomoloGene: 136777; GeneCards: IRS4; OMA:IRS4 - orthologs

Gene location (Human)
Chr.	X chromosome (human)
Band	Xq22.3	Start	108,719,946 bp
Band	Xq22.3	End	108,736,563 bp

Gene location (Mouse)
Chr.	X chromosome (mouse)
Band	X F2|X 62.43 cM	Start	140,493,994 bp
Band	X F2|X 62.43 cM	End	140,508,259 bp
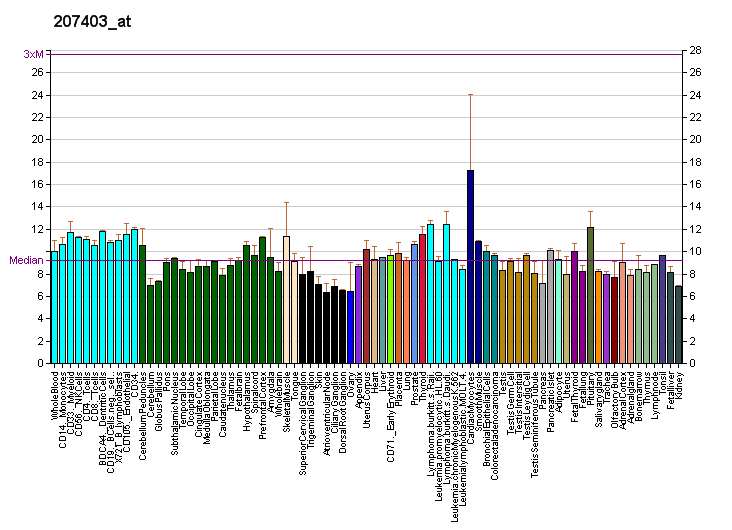
RNA expression pattern
Bgee	Human / Mouse (ortholog); Top expressed in: pituitary gland; anterior pituitary; ovary; left ovary; right ovary; gastric mucosa; hypothalamus; body of uterus; right lobe of thyroid gland; cervix / Top expressed in: median eminence; arcuate nucleus; ventromedial nucleus; dorsomedial hypothalamic nucleus; substantia nigra; gastrula; mammillary body; lateral hypothalamus; nucleus of stria terminalis; paraventricular nucleus of hypothalamus; More reference expression data
BioGPS	More reference expression data
Gene ontology
Molecular function	phosphatidylinositol 3-kinase binding; protein binding; signal transducer activity; insulin receptor binding
Cellular component	cytosol; membrane; plasma membrane
Biological process	insulin receptor signaling pathway; regulation of lipid metabolic process; signal transduction; positive regulation of signal transduction
Sources:Amigo / QuickGO
Orthologs
Species	Human	Mouse
Entrez	8471	16370
Ensembl	ENSG00000133124	ENSMUSG00000054667
UniProt	O14654	Q9Z0Y7
RefSeq (mRNA)	NM_003604; NM_001379150	NM_010572
RefSeq (protein)	NP_003595; NP_001366079	NP_034702
Location (UCSC)	Chr X: 108.72 – 108.74 Mb	Chr X: 140.49 – 140.51 Mb
PubMed search
- Wikidata
View/Edit Human	View/Edit Mouse

Insulin receptor substrate 4 is a protein that in humans is encoded by the IRS4 gene.

IRS4 encodes the insulin receptor substrate 4, a cytoplasmic protein that contains many potential tyrosine and serine/threonine phosphorylation sites. Tyrosine-phosphorylated IRS4 protein has been shown to associate with cytoplasmic signalling molecules that contain SH2 domains. The IRS4 protein is phosphorylated by the insulin receptor tyrosine kinase upon receptor stimulation.

== Interactions ==
IRS4 has been shown to interact with CRK and NISCH.
