= Whey acidic protein =

WAP
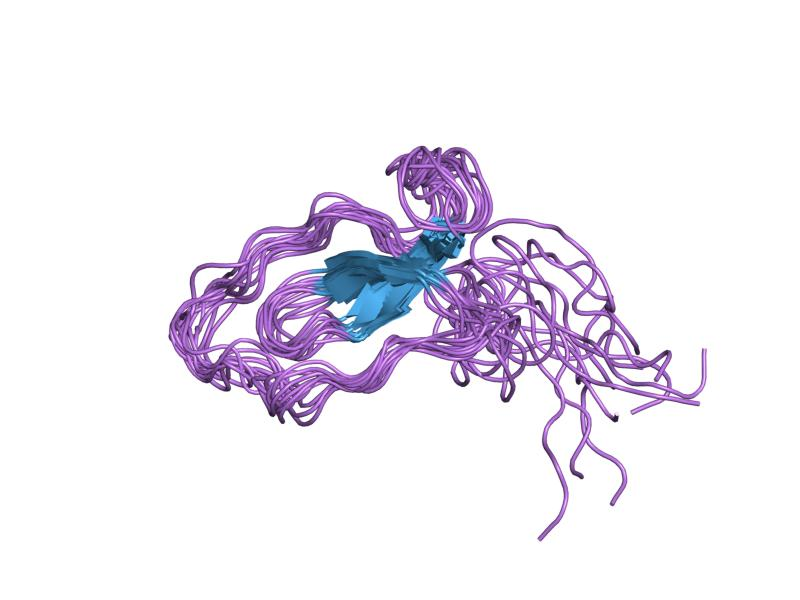
- R-elafin, a specific inhibitor of elastase (11 NMR structures, PDB: 2REL)

Identifiers
- Symbol: WAP
- Pfam: PF00095
- Pfam clan: CL0454
- InterPro: IPR008197
- PROSITE: PDOC00026
- SCOP2: 1fle / SCOPe / SUPFAM
Available protein structures:
- PDB: IPR008197 PF00095 (ECOD; PDBsum)
- AlphaFold: IPR008197; PF00095

In molecular biology, the Whey acidic proteins (WAP) have been identified as a major whey protein family in milk, and are important in regulating the proliferation of mammary epithelial cells. Additionally, their physiological function is thought to be similar to a protease inhibitor. It has been concluded, therefore, that WAP regulate the proliferation of mammary epithelial cells by preventing elastase-type serine proteases from carrying out laminin degradation and by suppressing the MAP kinase signal pathway in the cell cycle.

== Production in mammals ==
Whey Acidic Protein (WAP) is the major milk protein in certain mammals. There are exceptions in some mammalian species, whereby WAP has not been found to be synthesized in the mammary gland.

== WAP motif and cancer ==
There have been several candidate markers for cancer; most notably genes coding for elafin, antileukoproteinase 1 (previously called secretory leucocyte proteinase inhibitor, SLPI), WAP four disulphide core domain protein 1 (previously called prostate stromal protein 20 kDa, PS20), and WAP four disulphide core domain protein 2 (previously called major human epididymis-specific protein E4, HE4). These genes can be useful biomarkers for detecting tumours.

== Biochemistry of WAP motifs ==
Whey Acidic Protein contains two to three four-disulfide core domain, also termed WAP domain or WAP motif. Each disulfide bond of the WAP motif is made up of two cysteine molecule. This motif is also found in other proteins of different functions, which led to the suggestion that WAP is associated with antiprotease or antibacterial properties. The following schematic representation shows the position of the conserved cysteines that form the 'four-disulfide core' WAP domain

                          +---------------------+
                          |    +-----------+    |
                          |    |           |    |
        xxxxxxxCPxxxxxxxxxCxxxxCxxxxxCxxxxxCCxxxCxxxCxxxx
               |                     |      |       |
               |                     +--------------+
               |                            |
               +----------------------------+
        <------------------50-residues------------------>

'C': conserved cysteine involved in a disulfide bond.

- WAP-type 'four-disulfide core' domain in PROSITE

It has been found that humans and ruminants have the WAP gene in their genome as pseudogene. Although humans and ruminants do not seem to encode the gene, there is no detrimental effect. However, mouse pups feeding on maternal milk lacking Whey Acidic Protein has been associated with poor growth rate and lethality.
