= Charles Nicholas Hales =

English physician, biochemist, diabetologist, pathologist and professor

- Born: 25 April 1935; Stafford, Staffordshire
- Died: 15 September 2005 (aged 70); Cambridge, UK
- Occupations: Physician and medical researcher
- Known for: research on diabetes

Charles Nicholas "Nick" Hales (25 April 1935 – 15 September 2005) was an English physician, biochemist, diabetologist, pathologist, and professor of clinical biochemistry.

== Biography ==
After education at King Edward VI Grammar School, Stafford, C. Nicholas Hales matriculated in 1953 at Trinity College, Cambridge, graduating BA (Cantab.) in 1956. He studied medicine at University College Hospital Medical School, graduating MB BChir in 1959. At University College Hospital he was a house physician under Max Rosenheim. Hales returned to the University of Cambridge for graduate study in biochemistry. He received in 1964 his PhD under the supervision of Philip Randle.

When Hales began studying diabetes ... there were no methods for measuring the concentration of insulin in the blood. In 1960, Yalow and Berson had outlined a new type of biochemical test (or an immunoassay) using radioactive insulin and an insulin antibody, but the procedure was cumbersome and technically demanding. Hales set out to develop a simpler method, which he outlined in his PhD thesis, quickly establishing a reputation as an up-and-coming researcher.

From 1964 to 1970 he was lecturer in biochemistry at the University of Cambridge. During the 1960s he was elected a Fellow of Downing College, Cambridge, taught undergraduate classes, and held an appointment at Addenbrooke’s Hospital, where he treated diabetic patients. He graduated MD in 1971. From 1970 to 1977 Hales was head of the department and an honorary consultant in chemical pathology at Cardiff's Welsh National School of Medicine. From 1977 until retirement in 2002, Hales was professor and head of the department of clinical biochemistry at the University of Cambridge and also an honorary consultant physician at Addenbrooke’s Hospital.

During the 1980s Hales did research on insulin biosynthesis and secretion. He began to investigate the evolutionary origins of prohormones and how phosphorylation is related to molecular sites of prohormone processing. He spent the academic year 1984–1985 on sabbatical leave at the laboratory of Edwin G. Krebs at the University of Washington, Seattle.

... in Seattle Nick began collaborating with electrophysiologist Dan Cook, with whom he applied the new technique of patch clamping to study ion channels in pancreatic β-cells. Together they discovered a novel ATP-sensitive potassium channel and immediately recognized that this was a key component in the process of glucose-stimulated insulin secretion ... On his return to Cambridge, Nick collaborated with Mike Ashford to show that the aTP-sensitive K+ channel complex was the receptor through which sulphonylurea drugs act to stimulate insulin secretion ...

The research of Hales and Cook eventually led to the development of an important class of drugs for controlling diabetes.

... in the late 1980s, Hales ... and David Barker, an epidemiologist from University of Southampton, began to work on the associations between fetal development and later disease. Knowing that most insulin-producing cells are laid down during fetal life, Hales thought that poor in-utero nutrition could be harmful. With others, he showed that low birthweight greatly increased the risk of diabetes in later life.

Hales was a member of the editorial boards of many journals, including Clinical Science, Diabetologia, Journal of Endocrinology, Molecular and Cellular Endocrinology, Molecular Aspects of Medicine, and Molecular and Cellular Probes. He was a member of research grant committees of the British Diabetic Association from 1978 to 1982, the Medical Research Council from 1986 to 1990, and the British Heart Foundation from 1992 to 1997.

In 1959 in Westminster, London, he married Janet May Moss. They had two sons, Paul (1963–1995) and Timothy (born 1964), before their marriage ended in divorce in the late 1970s. In 1978 C. Nicholas Hales married Margaret Griffiths. They had a daughter Kathryn (born 1979).

== Awards and honours ==
- 1992 — FRS
- 1992 — Croonian Lecturer (of the RCP) on The aetiology of non-insulin-dependent diabetes
- 1995 — Baly Medal
- 1998 — Fellow of the Academy of Medical Sciences (FMedSci)
