= Manago =

Manago is a French surname. Notable people with the surname include:

- Cleo Manago (born 1960), African-American activist and social architect
- Marianne Grunberg-Manago (1921–2013), Soviet-born French biochemist
- Vincent Manago (1880–1936), French painter
