= Angelo Azzi =

Italian and Swiss biochemist

- Born: October 26, 1939 (age 86); Modena, Italy
- Occupations: Biochemist, author and academic

Academic background
- Education: University of Padua

Angelo Azzi is an Italian and Swiss biochemist, author and academic serving as a Professor Emeritus in the Institute of Biochemistry and Molecular Medicine at the University of Bern and Adjunct Faculty Member at Tufts University.

Azzi's work focuses on the biochemistry of enzymes, gene regulation, and metabolism, with an emphasis on vitamin E (alpha-tocopherol), antioxidants, and signaling pathways involving protein kinase C and diacylglycerol kinase. He has received awards, including the 2002 Vitamin Prize from the Society for Applied Vitamin Research, the Society of Free Radicals' Lifetime Achievement Award in 2014, the International Union of Biochemistry and Molecular Biology Distinguished Service Award in 2016, and the Nencki Award from the Nencki Institute of Experimental Biology in 2016.

Azzi is a Foreign Member of the Polish Academy of Sciences and a Lifetime Honorary Member of the Oxygen Club of California. He also holds editorial roles, including Editor-in-Chief of journals such as Molecular Aspects of Medicine and Aspects of Molecular Medicine.

== Education and career ==
Azzi earned an MD in 1963 from the University of Padua, followed by a PhD in General Pathology in 1969 and a PhD in Biochemistry in 1970. He worked at Institute of General Pathology under Massimo Aloisi, where he explored mitochondrial function and later collaborated with Giovanni Felice Azzone, contributing to the discovery of the permeability transition pore. In 1966, he pursued postdoctoral research as a Fellow in the Department of Biochemistry at the University of Bristol, focusing on mitochondrial transporters, and continued as a Research Fellow in the Department of Biophysics at the University of Pennsylvania from 1967 to 1969, studying mitochondrial membrane functions. Returning to Italy in the early 1970s, he became a Professor in 1973. In 1977, he relocated to Bern, Switzerland, becoming a Professor of Biochemistry at the University of Bern.

At the University of Bern, Azzi was the Head of the Department of the Medical Chemistry Institute, later serving as Professor and Director of the Institute of Biochemistry and Molecular Biology from 1984 to 2005, when he was named Professor Emeritus.

Azzi served on the Advisory Board of UNESCO's International Scientific Advisory Board/International Biological and Scientific Programme (ISAB/IBSP) from 1997 to 2015. During this period, he held the position of President of the International Union of Biochemistry and Molecular Biology (IUBMB) from 2006 to 2012 and Past-President from 2013 to 2015. His leadership also extended to the Society for Free Radical Research International, where he acted as President from 2007 to 2010 and Past-President from 2010 to 2013.

== Research ==
Azzi has researched the mechanisms through which vitamin E and lycopene prevent prostate cancer and has discovered the transport carrier for aspartic and glutamic acids in mitochondria. He has evaluated vitamin E's roles beyond its antioxidative properties, highlighting its involvement in cellular signaling, gene regulation, and disease prevention. In a joint study with Achim Stocker, he explored the functions of α-tocopherol, revealing its selective antioxidant role, non-antioxidant mechanisms, and effects on cellular processes, including protein kinase C inhibition and gene transcription. He also investigated the effects of α-tocopherol on cell proliferation, demonstrating its concentration-dependent inhibition of vascular smooth muscle cell proliferation through protein kinase C inhibition. His findings suggested that α-tocopherol has non-antioxidant molecular functions, acting as a ligand for proteins that regulate signal transduction and gene expression, with no compensatory antioxidant response observed in its deficiency. Building upon this, he looked into the effect of lycopene, alone or with other antioxidants, on the growth of prostate carcinoma cell lines, and found that lycopene alone was not a potent inhibitor, but its combination with α-tocopherol strongly inhibited cell proliferation in a synergistic manner. Furthermore, examining the role of protein kinase C in signal transduction, he emphasized its activation by various agents and involvement in tumor promotion, while calling for additional research into its physiological substrates. His work also analyzed the formation of hydrogen peroxide in the mitochondrial respiratory chain, identifying the superoxide radical as a precursor of H_{2}O_{2} generation.

Azzi has published course books, including Membrane Proteins: Isolation and Characterization (1986), Dynamics of Membrane Proteins and Cellular Energetics (1988), and Organelles in Eukaryotic Cells: Molecular Structure and Interactions (1989). In 1989, he co-edited Molecular Basis of Membrane-Associated Diseases with Zdenek Drahota and Sergio Papa, examining molecular changes in biological membranes linked to diseases like lysosomal, peroxisomal, and mitochondrial disorders, enzyme defects, and receptor abnormalities related to oncogenes. That same year, he co-edited Anion Carriers of Mitochondrial Membranes with Katarzyna A. Nalecz, Maciej J. Nalecz, and Lech Wojtczak, covering the structure, function, isolation, transport kinetics, and metabolic regulation of mitochondrial anion carriers. In 2000, he co-authored Antioxidants in Diabetes Management (Oxidative Stress and Disease) with Peter Rosen, Hans J. Tritschler, and Glenn A. King, exploring oxidative stress in diabetes and the potential of antioxidant therapies. Reviewing the book for Trends in Endocrinology and Metabolism, Kailash Prasad wrote, "the authors should be commended for an admirable job in framing a succinct review of the pathophysiology associated with the development of diabetes and its associated complications, and opportunities that antioxidants might offer for therapy in diabetes."

== Awards and honors ==
- 1994 – Foreign Member, Polish Academy of Sciences
- 2001 – Lifetime Honorary Member, Oxygen Club of California
- 2002 – Vitamin Prize, Society for Applied Vitamin Research
- 2014 – Lifetime Achievement Award, Society of Free Radicals Europe
- 2016 – Distinguished Service Award, International Union of Biochemistry and Molecular Biology
- 2016 – Nencki Award, Nencki Institute of Experimental Biology

== Bibliography ==
=== Selected books ===
- Membrane Proteins: Isolation and Characterization (1986) ISBN 978-3540170143
- Molecular Basis of Membrane-Associated Diseases (1989) ISBN 978-3642744174
- Organelles in Eukaryotic Cells: Molecular Structure and Interactions (1989) ISBN 978-0306433887
- Anion Carriers of Mitochondrial Membranes (1989) ISBN 978-3642745416
- Antioxidants in Diabetes Management (Oxidative Stress and Disease) (2000) ISBN 978-0824788445

=== Selected articles ===
- Loschen, G., Azzi, A., Richter, C., & Flohé, L. (1974). Superoxide radicals as precursors of mitochondrial hydrogen peroxide. FEBS letters, 42(1), 68-72.
- Boscoboinik, D., Szewczyk, A., Hensey, C., & Azzi, A. (1991). Inhibition of cell proliferation by alpha-tocopherol. Role of protein kinase C. Journal of Biological Chemistry, 266(10), 6188-6194.
- Azzi, A., & Stocker, A. (2000). Vitamin E: non-antioxidant roles. Progress in lipid Research, 39(3), 231-255.
- Brigelius-Flohé, R., Kelly, F. J., Salonen, J. T., Neuzil, J., Zingg, J. M., & Azzi, A. (2002). The European perspective on vitamin E: current knowledge and future research. The American journal of clinical nutrition, 76(4), 703-716.
- Azzi, A. (2007). Molecular mechanism of α-tocopherol action. Free Radical Biology and Medicine, 43(1), 16-21.
- Azzi, A. (2024). Oxidative Stress: Cannot be Measured, Localized, Prevented, or Treated. Medical Research Archives, 12(2).
