= Biotechnology industry in China =

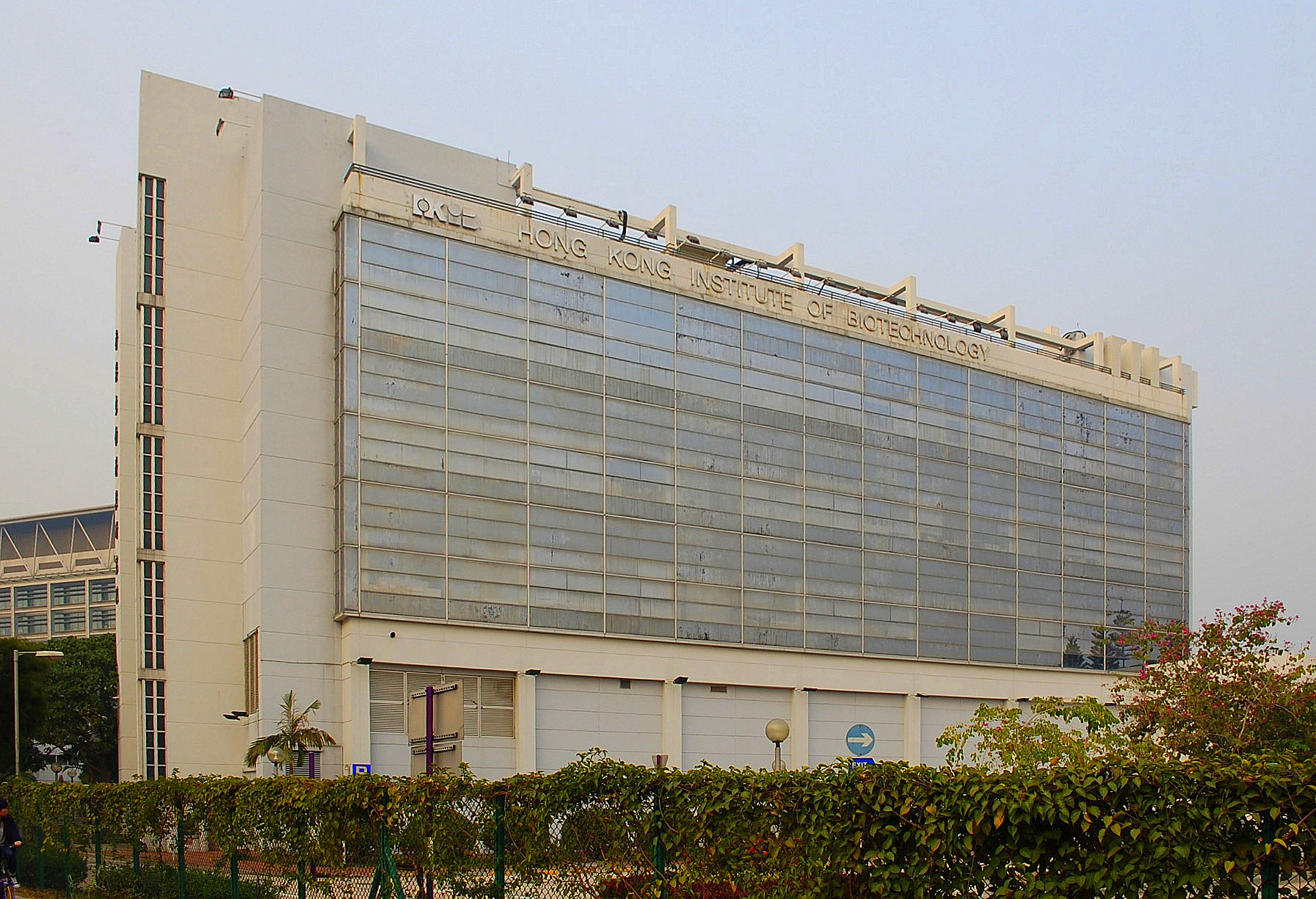
The Hong Kong Institute of Biotechnology

China has seen double-digit growth in its biotechnology industry and has gone from being one of the slowest to one of the fastest nations in the adoption of new biotechnologies. The biotech sector is seen in China and internationally as a core area of national scientific and economic development. The main national biotech body in the country is the China National Center for Biotechnology Development. The CNCBD is an organization established on November 3, 1983, under the Ministry of Science and Technology with the approval of the State Council. CNCBD is the sole national center to coordinate and implement the national S&T program in Biotechnology and Health.

== Industry ==
The biotech industry in China started in 1984. By 1997, the number of Chinese biotech companies was about 200. In 2000 it was estimated that the number of Chinese biotech companies tripled to 600. In 2005 China's biotechnology industry increased to 900 modern biotech companies. China's biotech industry registered sales totaling US$2.4 billion in 2000, compared with US$31 million in 1986.

=== Development factors ===
China's biopharmaceutical industry is gradually expanding due to such favorable factors as China's rapid economic growth, people's higher income, and increasing understanding of and demand for biopharmaceuticals. The biopharmaceutical industry has begun to play a more important role in the national economy, drawing more attention from investors - both private and public.

=== Healthcare ===
With the improvement of the healthcare system and people's rising awareness of disease treatment, more non-conservative treatment methods are used in clinical treatment, which has promoted the development of blood products. Currently, blood products frequently used in clinical treatment include over 20 types, belonging to such 3 sub-catalogues as human serum albumin, immunoglobulin and coagulation factors.

=== Vaccine ===
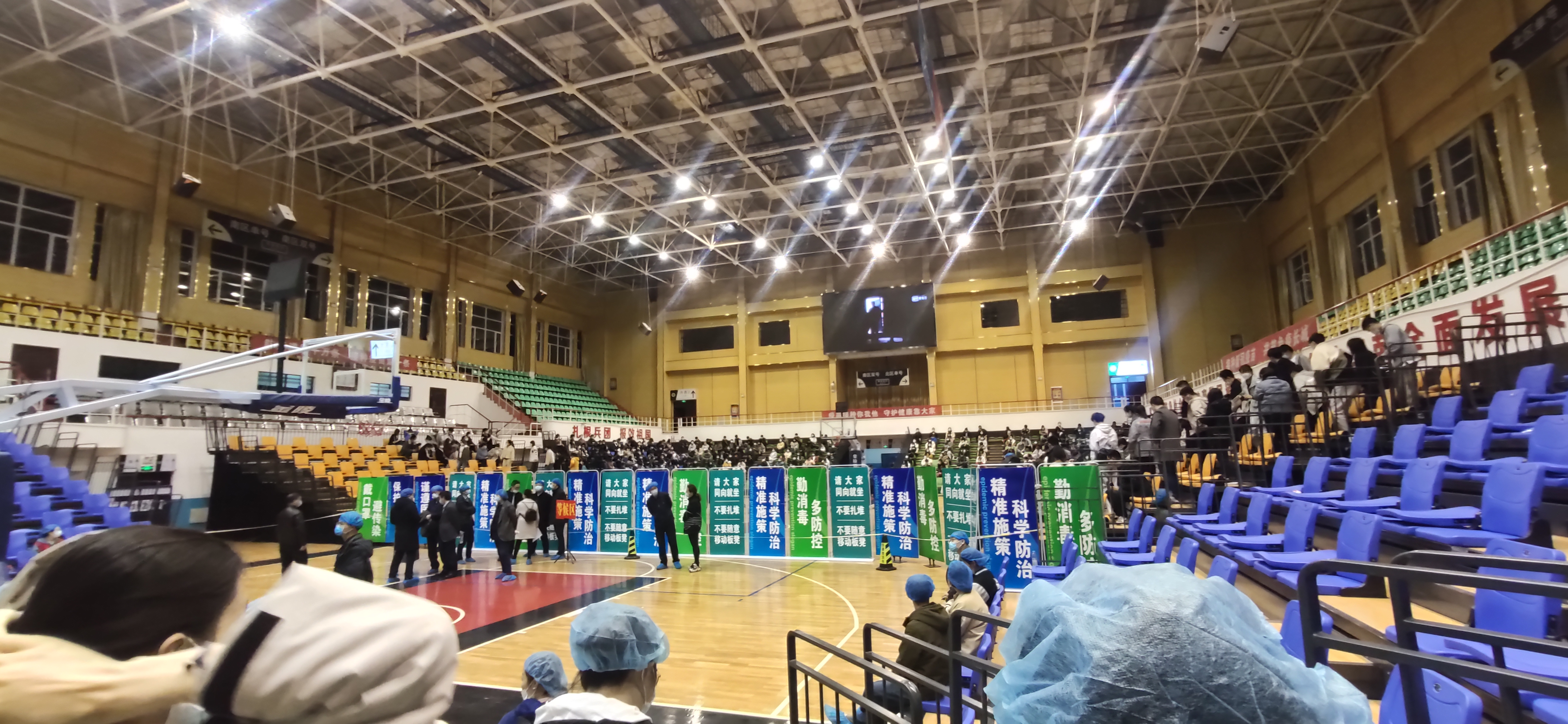
Mass vaccination at Shihezi University in Xinjiang

The demand of charged vaccine has increased dramatically with the rising consumption power and health awareness of people so that charged vaccine market is expanding rapidly. Charged vaccine as a supplement to free vaccine program has promoted the rapid growth of domestic vaccine market, the external diagnostic reagent is becoming familiar with people owing to people's deeper understanding of catalogues and curative effect of biological drugs. Nowadays genetic drugs and antibody drugs are replacing the chemical drugs which have many side effects to cure the cancer patients, and this will bring more opportunities for cancer patients to survive.

=== Import and export ===
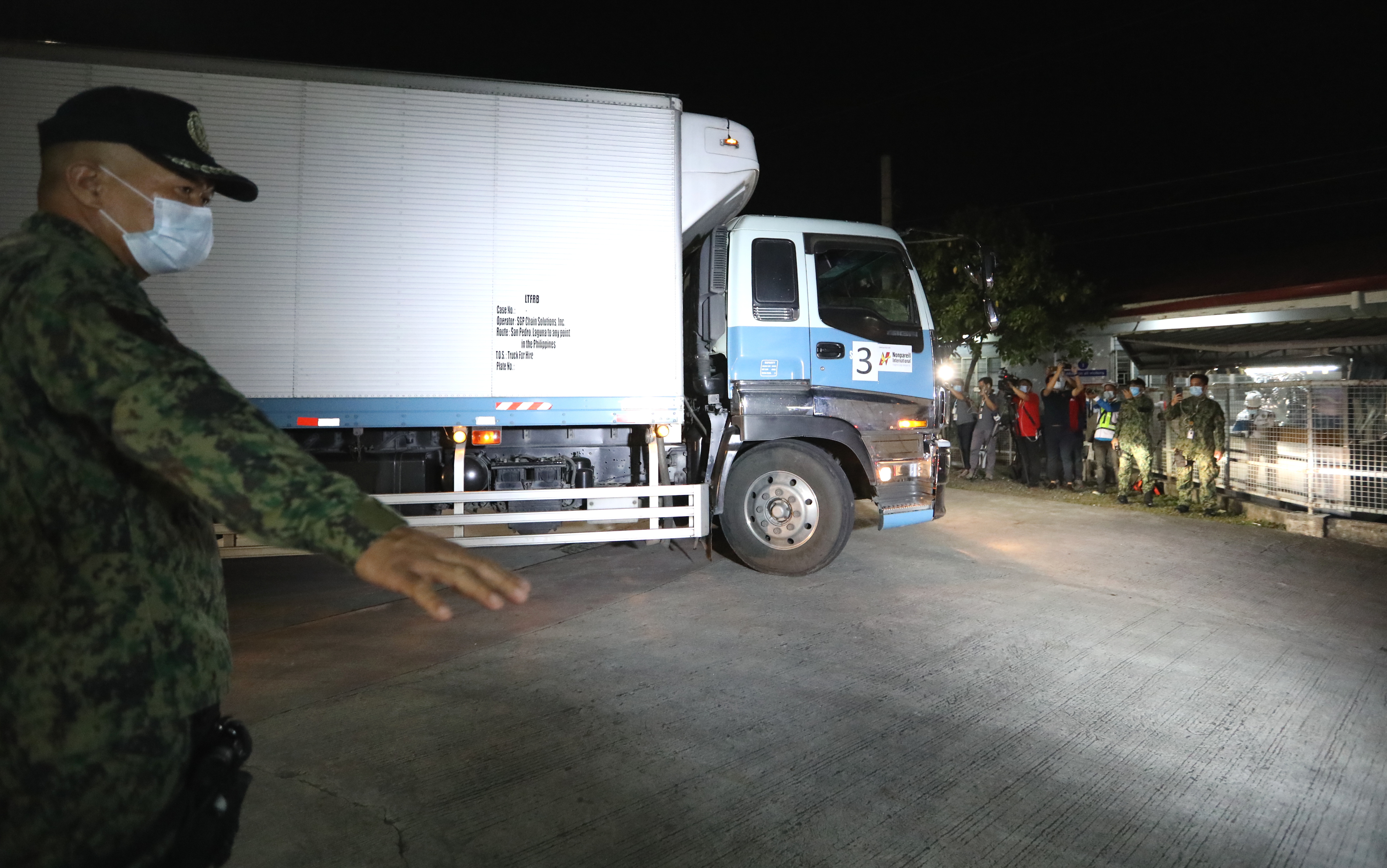
Export of CoronaVac vaccines (created by Sinovac Biotech) to Marikina City, the Philippines

The import and export volume of China's biopharmaceutical products was 377 million dollars in 2007, increased by 48% as compared with last year. The import volume reached 336 million dollars, which increased by 51% as compared with 2006, and the export volume was 41 million dollars.

The growth rate of export volume in 2007 had declined from the level of 58% in 2006 to 26% in 2007. Although the export of China's biopharmaceutical industry constantly kept a high growth rate, the volume is very small compared with the import volume.

The export volume was only 41 million dollars in 2007 whereas the import volume added up to US$336 million. This sharp contrast indicated that China's biopharmaceutical products accounted for a very low market ratio in the international market.

== Agricultural biotechnology ==
China's Minister of Agriculture Du Qinglin stated in July 2006 that science and technology should contribute up to 63% of the growth of Chinese agriculture sector by 2020. The minister outlined five areas that will be the focus of China in attempt to take advantage of biotechnology in agriculture, including GM cotton and rice, safe farm products, agricultural equipment, and research institutions.

== Organizations ==
=== R&D ===
- Chinese Academy of Agricultural Sciences (CAAS)
- Chinese Academy of Medical Sciences (CAMS)
- Chinese Academy of Forestry (CAF)
- Chinese Academy of Sciences (CAS)
- National Natural Science Foundation of China (NSFC)
- China Association for Science and Technology (CAST)

=== Ministries ===
- Ministry of Science and Technology (MOST)
- Ministry of Health (MOH)
- Ministry of Agriculture (MOA)
- Ministry of Education (MOE)

=== Agencies ===
- State Food and Drug Administration (SDA)
- State Environment Protection Administration (SEPA)
- State Intellectual Property Office (SIPO)
- National Natural Science Foundation of China (NSFC)
- China Science and Technology Exchange Center (CSTEC)

== State programs ==
=== National Key Technologies R&D Program (NKTRDP) ===
Approved in 1982 and implemented for three Five-year Plans, the program includes three major issues: agriculture, new and high technologies and social development. The research on biological technologies is focused on agricultural breeding, gene medicine, marine biological products and the industrialization on key technologies.

=== National High Technology Research and Development Program (863 program) ===
The program was approved in March 1986 (because of that date it is simply called "863"). Its objective was to develop frontier high technology to narrow the gap between China and developed countries. The program lists biotechnology as one of seven targeted areas. '863' is China's biggest S&T development program. The budget for the 863 program has been raised from RMB 5.9 billion in the past 15 years to RMB 15 billion for the 10th 5-Year-Plan (2001–2005).

=== Torch Program ===
Established in 1988, the Torch Program aims to commercialize China's new and high technologies. The program encourages to invest in China's high technology zones.

=== Spark Program ===
Established in 1986, the Spark Program was the first program to promote the development of rural economy by relying on science and technology. One of the main contents of the program is the development of high yield, high quality and high effective agricultural products.

== Science parks and incubators ==
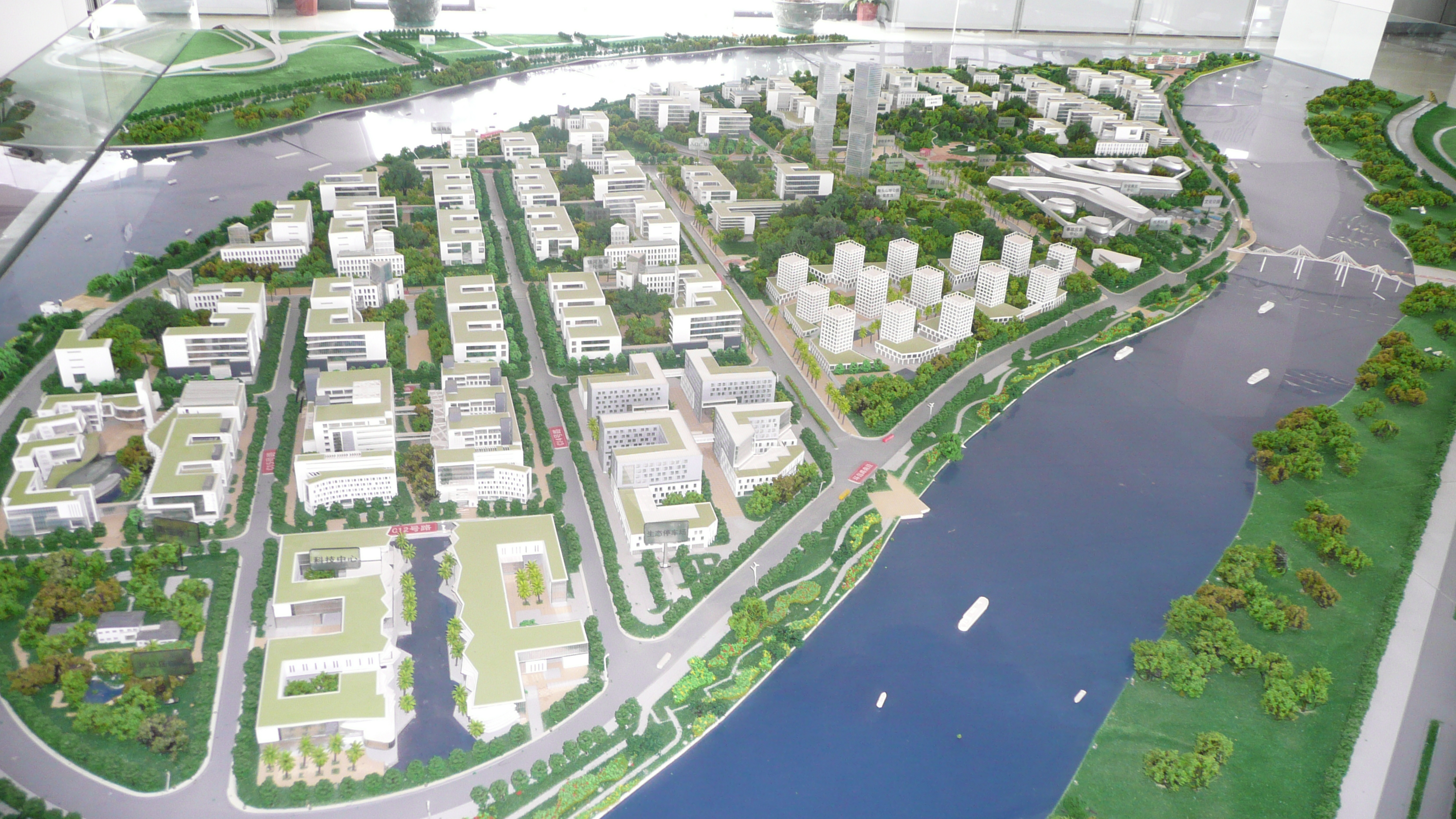
Guangzhou International Biotech Island

Since the start of China's Torch Program in August 1988, 53 "National Science and Technology Industrial Parks" (STIPs) have been approved by the State Council (State-Level Hi-Tech and New Technology Zones). By 2000, there were altogether 20,796 enterprises in the STIPs.

== Biotech initiatives ==
- Category:Biotechnology

== See also ==
- Pharmaceutical industry in China
- Biotechnology industrial park
- Biotechnology and Applied Biochemistry, a peer-reviewed journal
- Biotechnology and Biological Sciences Research Council
- Directive on the legal protection of biotechnological inventions Directive 98/44/EC

== Journals ==
- Journal of Chinese Biotechnology
- Chinese Journal of Agricultural Biotechnology
