= Teston (disambiguation) =

Teston is a village and civil parish in the Maidstone District of Kent, England.

Teston may also refer to:

- Michel Teston (born 1944), French politician
- Teston, Vaughan, Ontario, Canada
- Teston d'argent, a currency used in France during the Middle Ages; see Livre tournois

== See also ==
- Testone, surname
- Testoni, surname
