= Testoni =

Testoni is an Italian surname. Notable people with the surname include:

- Alfredo Testoni (1856–1931), Italian playwright and poet
- Bruto Testoni (1891–1949), Italian wrestler
- Claudia Testoni (1915–1998), Italian athlete
- Ines Testoni, Italian psychologist
- Jerson Testoni (born 1980), Brazilian football coach
- Nic Testoni (born 1972), Australian actor
- Pier Alberto Testoni (born 1950), Italian fencer
- Piero Testoni (1951–2025), Italian politician
- Rodolfo Testoni (born 1998), Brazilian footballer
- Testoni–Valla rivalry, rivalry between two Italian female athletes, Claudia Testoni and Ondina Valla, in the 1930s

== See also ==
- Teston (disambiguation)
- Testone, surname
