= William Joseph Whelan =

American scientist (1924–2021)

- Born: 14 December 1924; Salford, England
- Died: 5 June 2021 (aged 96); Miami, Florida, U.S.
- Education: University of Birmingham (B.Sc., Ph.D.)
- Known for: Discovery of glycogenin
- Scientific career
- Fields: Starch and glycogen chemistry
- Institutions: University College of North Wales, Bangor; University of London; Royal Free Hospital School of Medicine, University of Miami Medical School
- Thesis: (1948)

William Joseph Whelan FRS (14 November 1924 – 5 June 2021) was a British-born American biochemist. He was professor and chair of biochemistry and molecular biology at the Miller School of Medicine at the University of Miami. He founded the annual Miami Winter Symposium in 1967 and was chief editor of the journal IUBMB Life.

== Biography ==
Whelan was born in Salford, Greater Manchester in 1924. He studied organic chemistry at the University of Birmingham starting in 1942, earning a B.Sc. in 1944 and Ph.D. in 1948. He taught at University College of North Wales and the University of London, and became head of the department of biochemistry of the Royal Free Hospital School of Medicine, University of London in 1964. In 1967, he moved to the United States and served as professor and chairman of the department of biochemistry and molecular biology of the Miller School of Medicine at the University of Miami. He became professor and chairman emeritus in 1991.

Whelan was known for his pioneering research on the structure of starch and glycogen. He discovered that glycogen contained the protein glycogenin. He was elected as a Fellow of the Royal Society in 1992. He died on 5 June 2021 at the age of 96.

Whelan was a tireless promoter of international collaboration between biochemical societies. He became the first General Secretary of FEBS in 1964. From 1973 to 1983 he was General Secretary of IUB (now IUBMB) and later Co-Editor-in-Chief of IUBMB Life. From 1970 to 1972 he was the first General Secretary of PAABS (now PABMB). Finally, he contributed to the founding of FAOBMB.
