= Alexandra Newton =

US-based Protein Kinase C expert

Alexandra C. Newton
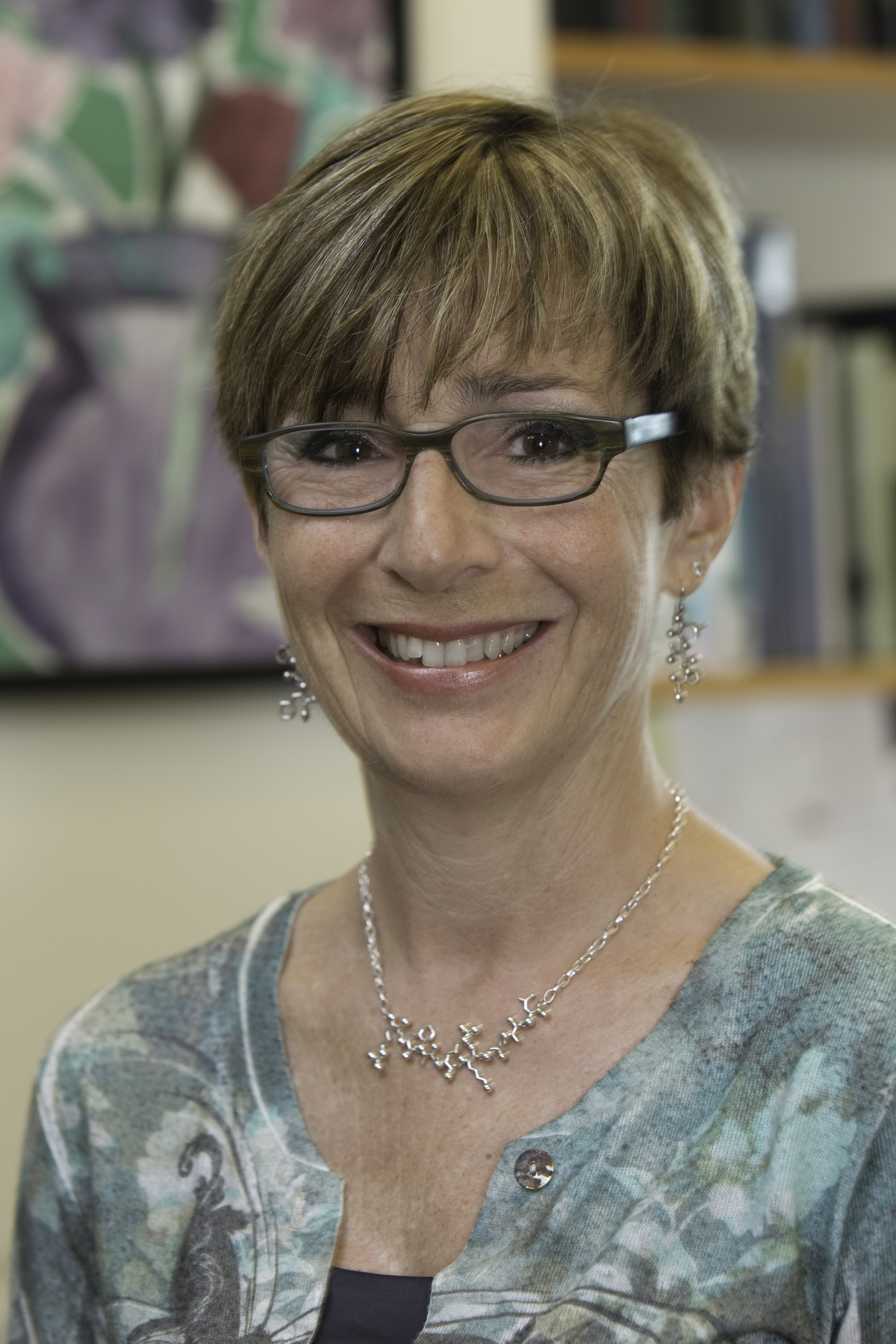
- Born: Cape Town, South Africa
- Education: Simon Fraser University, Stanford University (PhD)
- Awards: Avanti Lipids Award, ASBMB (2007), Julius Axelrod Award in Pharmacology, ASPET (2019), Biophysics of Health and Disease Biophysical Society (2020), Marie Maynard Daly Award, Protein Society (2024), Doctor of Science, honoris causa, Simon Fraser University (2024)
- Scientific career
- Fields: Cell Signaling; Protein kinase C; Protein Kinase; AKT1; Protein phosphatase; Diglcyeride; PHLPP
- Workplaces: University of California, San Diego; Indiana University; Stanford University; University of California, Berkeley; Simon Fraser University
- Thesis: 'Intermembrane Protein Transfer'
- Website: http://newtonlab.ucsd.edu

Alexandra C. Newton is a Canadian and American biochemist. She is a Distinguished Professor of pharmacology at the University of California, San Diego. Newton runs a multidisciplinary Protein kinase C and Cell signaling biochemistry and cell biology research group in the School of Medicine, investigating molecular mechanisms of signal transduction in the Phospholipase C (PLC) and Phosphoinositide 3-kinase (PI3 kinase, or PI3-K) signaling pathways. She has been continuously funded by the US National Institutes of Health since 1988.

== Early life and education ==
Newton was born in Cape Town, South Africa, and was schooled in Vancouver, Athens, and Aix-en-Provence. She graduated in 1980 from the Simon Fraser University in Canada, where she was awarded a 1st-class honours degree in biochemistry and French literature. She received her PhD in chemistry in 1986 from Stanford University, working with Wray H. Huestis on a thesis examining band 3, a red cell membrane protein.

== Career ==
Following her PhD defense, Newton took up a postdoctoral research position at University of California, Berkeley in the laboratory of Daniel E. Koshland Jr. between 1986 and 1988, and subsequently began her own independent research laboratory in 1988, as assistant professor in Chemistry at Indiana University, subsequently receiving tenure as associate professor in 1994. She moved to University of California, San Diego in 1995, first as associate professor in pharmacology and then Professor, from 2001 to 2017. Between 2002 and 2006, she was vice-chair, then chair, of the Biomedical Sciences Graduate Program before becoming the Director of the Molecular Pharmacology Track in the Biomedical Sciences Graduate Program at the University of California San Diego. She was conferred with the title of Distinguished Professor of Pharmacology in 2017. As of 2020, she is president-elect for the International Union of Biochemistry and Molecular Biology, having served, since 2016, as ASBMB representative to the IUBMB general assembly, and, since 2015, as a Member of the International Union of Biochemistry and Molecular Biology Executive Committee for Congresses and Conferences. Newton has supervised, and graduated, more 25 PhD postgraduate students and trained 23 Postdoctoral Fellows.

== Research ==
Newton has been a major driver in the PKC research field since the 1980s, working originally with Daniel E. Koshland Jr. She helped define the multiple different mechanisms of PKC regulation by phosphorylation and its interaction with specific membrane phospholipids, such as phosphatidylserine She has also made important discoveries in the protein phosphatase field, discovering and naming PHLPP (PH domain and Leucine rich repeat Protein Phosphatases), which regulate intracellular signaling through dephosphorylation of AKT.

As of 2020, Newton has published over 190 peer-reviewed research articles that have been cited more than 25,000 times, been awarded 1 patent and co-edited two books on protein biochemistry and PKC. Her work straddles basic research and has illuminated understanding of PKC in Alzheimer's disease and as a tumor suppressor in human cancers

== Editorials, research honours, scientific service and outreach ==
Newton was a member of the editorial board of the Journal of Biological Chemistry between 1995 and 2000, an associate editor of Molecular Pharmacology (2000-2003) and since 1990, has been an expert reviewer for the National Science Foundation and Medical Research Council of Canada. She has been chair, or co-chair, for multiple committees of the American Society for Biochemistry and Molecular Biology.
