= IntEnz =

Biological enzyme database

IntEnz (Integrated relational Enzyme database) contains data on enzymes organized by enzyme EC number and is the official version of the Enzyme Nomenclature system developed by the International Union of Biochemistry and Molecular Biology.
