= PHLPPL =

Protein-coding gene in humans

PHLPP2

Identifiers
- Aliases: PHLPP2, PHLPPL, PPM3B, PH domain and leucine rich repeat protein phosphatase 2
- External IDs: OMIM: 611066; MGI: 2444928; GeneCards: PHLPP2
Enzyme activity
EC #	BRENDA	ExPASy	KEGG	MetaCyc
3.1.3.16	↗	↗	↗	↗

Gene location (Human)
Chr.	Chromosome 16 (human)
Band	16q22.2	Start	71,637,835 bp
Band	16q22.2	End	71,724,701 bp

Gene location (Mouse)
Chr.	Chromosome 8 (mouse)
Band	8|8 D3	Start	110,595,174 bp
Band	8|8 D3	End	110,671,303 bp
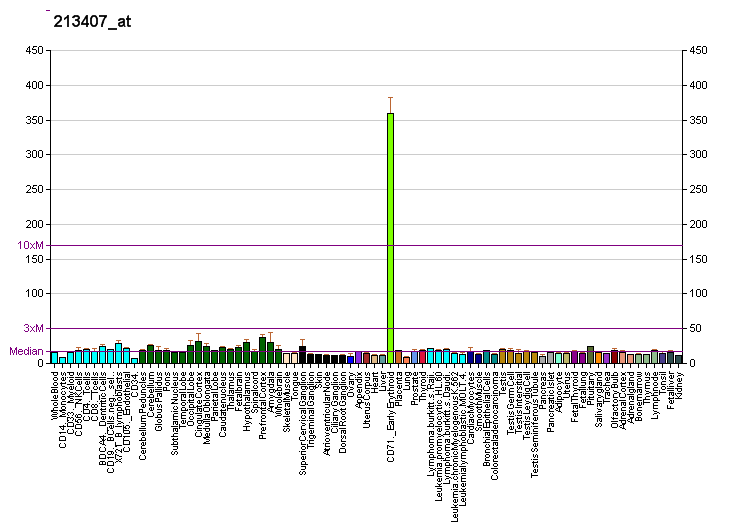

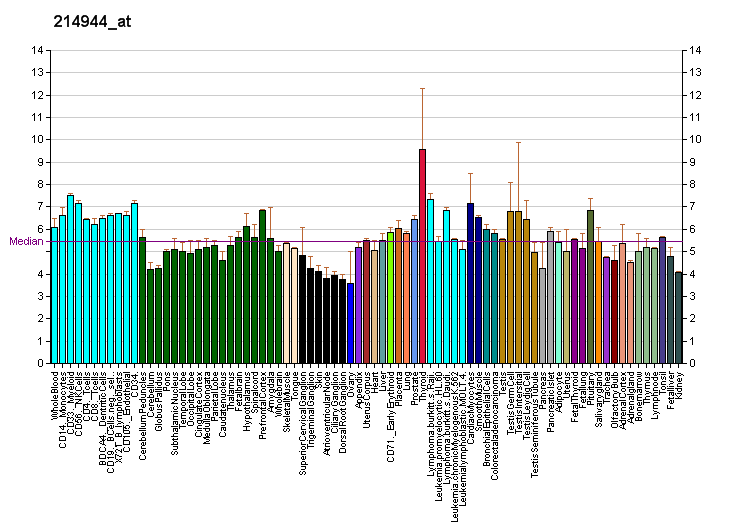
RNA expression pattern
Bgee	Human / Mouse (ortholog); Top expressed in: mucosa of ileum; jejunal mucosa; mucosa of colon; mucosa of sigmoid colon; middle temporal gyrus; retinal pigment epithelium; germinal epithelium; Brodmann area 46; duodenum; mucosa of transverse colon / Top expressed in: retinal pigment epithelium; left colon; neural layer of retina; dorsomedial hypothalamic nucleus; jejunum; hand; ciliary body; substantia nigra; paraventricular nucleus of hypothalamus; ventral tegmental area; More reference expression data
BioGPS	More reference expression data
Gene ontology
Molecular function	catalytic activity; phosphoprotein phosphatase activity; hydrolase activity; metal ion binding; protein binding; protein serine/threonine phosphatase activity
Cellular component	cytoplasm; cytosol; membrane; nucleus; photoreceptor inner segment; photoreceptor outer segment membrane
Biological process	hippocampus development; protein dephosphorylation; signal transduction; negative regulation of protein kinase B signaling
Sources:Amigo / QuickGO
Orthologs
Databases	NCBI: entry; OMA: entry
Species	Human	Mouse
Entrez	23035	244650
Ensembl	ENSG00000040199	ENSMUSG00000031732
UniProt	Q6ZVD8	Q8BXA7
RefSeq (mRNA)	NM_015020; NM_001289003	NM_001122594
RefSeq (protein)	NP_001275932; NP_055835	NP_001116066
Location (UCSC)	Chr 16: 71.64 – 71.72 Mb	Chr 8: 110.6 – 110.67 Mb
PubMed search
- Wikidata
View/Edit Human	View/Edit Mouse

PHPH domain leucine-rich repeat-containing protein phosphatase 2, also known as PHLPP2, is an enzyme which in humans is encoded by the PHLPP2 gene (previously PHLPPL).

== See also ==
- PHLPP
