= PHLPP1 =

Protein-coding gene in the species Homo sapiens

Identifiers
- Aliases: PHLPP1, PHLPP, PLEKHE1, SCOP, PPM3A, PH domain and leucine rich repeat protein phosphatase 1
- External IDs: OMIM: 609396; MGI: 2138327; GeneCards: PHLPP1
Enzyme activity
EC #	BRENDA	ExPASy	KEGG	MetaCyc
3.1.3.16	↗	↗	↗	↗

Gene location (Human)
Chr.	Chromosome 18 (human)
Band	18q21.33	Start	62,715,541 bp
Band	18q21.33	End	62,980,433 bp

Gene location (Mouse)
Chr.	Chromosome 1 (mouse)
Band	1|1 E2.1	Start	106,099,482 bp
Band	1|1 E2.1	End	106,321,980 bp
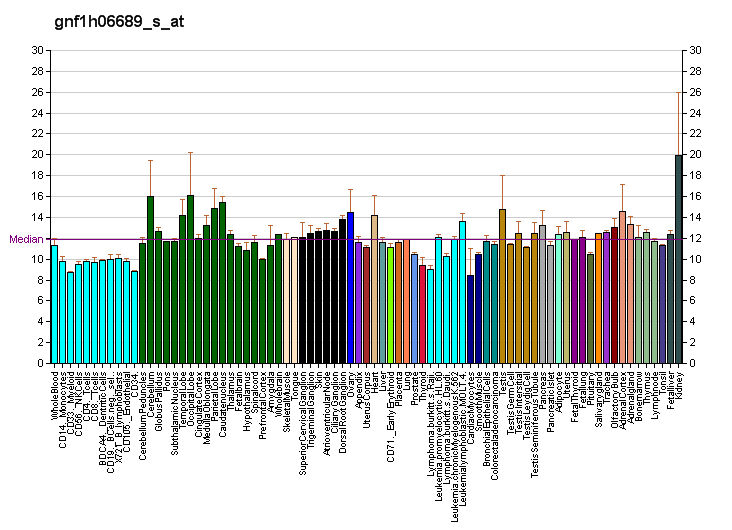
RNA expression pattern
Bgee	Human / Mouse (ortholog); Top expressed in: corpus callosum; ventricular zone; internal globus pallidus; middle frontal gyrus; inferior ganglion of vagus nerve; optic nerve; ganglionic eminence; buccal mucosa cell; Region I of hippocampus proper; external globus pallidus / Top expressed in: deep cerebellar nuclei; lateral geniculate nucleus; globus pallidus; substantia nigra; medial geniculate nucleus; pontine nuclei; dorsal tegmental nucleus; medial dorsal nucleus; mammillary body; superior colliculus; More reference expression data
BioGPS	More reference expression data
Gene ontology
Molecular function	phosphoprotein phosphatase activity; metal ion binding; protein binding; catalytic activity; hydrolase activity; protein serine/threonine phosphatase activity
Cellular component	cytosol; membrane; nucleus; cytoplasm; plasma membrane; nuclear membrane; photoreceptor inner segment; photoreceptor outer segment membrane
Biological process	regulation of apoptotic process; regulation of MAPK cascade; protein dephosphorylation; entrainment of circadian clock; regulation of JNK cascade; regulation of T cell anergy; regulation of p38MAPK cascade; apoptotic process; regulation of protein kinase C signaling; negative regulation of protein kinase B signaling
Sources:Amigo / QuickGO
Orthologs
Databases	NCBI: entry; OMA: entry
Species	Human	Mouse
Entrez	23239	98432
Ensembl	ENSG00000081913	ENSMUSG00000044340
UniProt	O60346	Q8CHE4
RefSeq (mRNA)	NM_194449	NM_133821
RefSeq (protein)	NP_919431	NP_598582
Location (UCSC)	Chr 18: 62.72 – 62.98 Mb	Chr 1: 106.1 – 106.32 Mb
PubMed search
- Wikidata
View/Edit Human	View/Edit Mouse

PH domain leucine-rich repeat-containing protein phosphatase 1, also known as PHLPP1, is an enzyme which in humans is encoded by the PHLPP1 gene (previously PHLPP). It is part of the serine/threonine phosphatase family.

== See also ==
- PHLPP
