= University of Padua =

Public university in Padua, Italy

- Università degli Studi di Padova
- Latin: Universitas Studii Paduani
- Motto: Latin: Universa Universis Patavina Libertas
- Motto in English: Liberty of Padua, universally and for all
- Type: Public research university
- Established: September 1222; 804 years ago
- Accreditation: MIUR
- Affiliations: Coimbra Group, TIME network
- Budget: €831 million (2023)
- Rector: Daniela Mapelli
- Faculty: 4,580 (2021)
- Administrative staff: 2,432 (2021)
- Students: 72,280 (2021)
- Undergraduates: 38,969 (2021)
- Postgraduates: 31,827 (2021)
- Doctoral students: 1,484 (2021)
- Location: Padua, Italy; 45°24′24″N 11°52′39″E
- Campus: Urban (University town)
- Sports teams: CUS Padova
- Colors: Padua Red
- Website: www.unipd.it/en

The University of Padua (Italian: Università degli Studi di Padova, UNIPD) is an Italian public research university in Padua, Italy. It was founded in 1222 by a group of students and teachers from the University of Bologna, who previously settled in Vicenza; thus, it is the second-oldest university in Italy, as well as the world's fifth-oldest surviving university.

The University of Padua was one of the most prominent universities in early modern Europe, known particularly for the rigor of its Aristotelian logic and science. Together with the University of Bologna, Padua had played a central role in the Italian Renaissance, housing and educating a number of Italian Renaissance mathematicians, amongst them Nicolaus Copernicus. It is also known for its long-standing tradition in medicine and anatomy, linked to great figures such as Andreas Vesalius, the "father of modern anatomy," and Galileo Galilei, who once taught there. The university also houses the world's oldest anatomical theatre (1594), a symbol of Padua's pioneering role in the development of modern medicine.

As of 2021, it is made up of 32 departments and eight schools. Padua is part of a network of historical research universities known as the Coimbra Group. In 2021, the university had approximately 72,000 students including undergraduates, postgraduates, and doctoral students.

== History ==
The university is conventionally said to have been founded in 1222 when a large group of students and professors left the University of Bologna in search of more academic freedom ('Libertas scholastica'), although it is certain that schools of law and medicine with students from various nations existed near Padua for a few years before 1222, more precisely in Vicenza. In reality, the first place where this group of students and professors from Bologna settled was at the University of Vicenza, where they were welcomed. Due to various vicissitudes, the headquarters was permanently moved to Padua. The first subjects to be taught were law and theology. The curriculum expanded rapidly, and by 1399 the institution had divided in two: a Universitas Iuristarum for civil law and Canon law, and a Universitas Artistarum which taught astronomy, dialectic, philosophy, grammar, medicine, and rhetoric. There was also a Universitas Theologorum, established in 1373 by Urban V.

The student body was divided into groups known as "nations" which reflected their places of origin. The nations themselves fell into two groups:

1. the cismontanes for the Italian students
2. the ultramontanes for those who came from beyond the Alps

From the fifteenth to the eighteenth century, the university was renowned for its research, particularly in the areas of medicine, astronomy, philosophy and law. At the time it was the most renowned school of medicine internationally. During this time, the university adopted the Latin motto: Universa universis patavina libertas (Paduan Freedom is Universal for Everyone). Nevertheless, the university had a turbulent history, and there was no teaching in 1237–1261, 1509–1517, 1848–1850.

The Botanical Garden of Padova, established by the university in 1545, is one of the oldest gardens of its kind in the world. Its alleged title of oldest academic garden is in controversy because the Medici created one in Pisa in 1544. In addition to the garden, best visited in the spring and summer, the university also manages nine museums, including a History of physics museum.

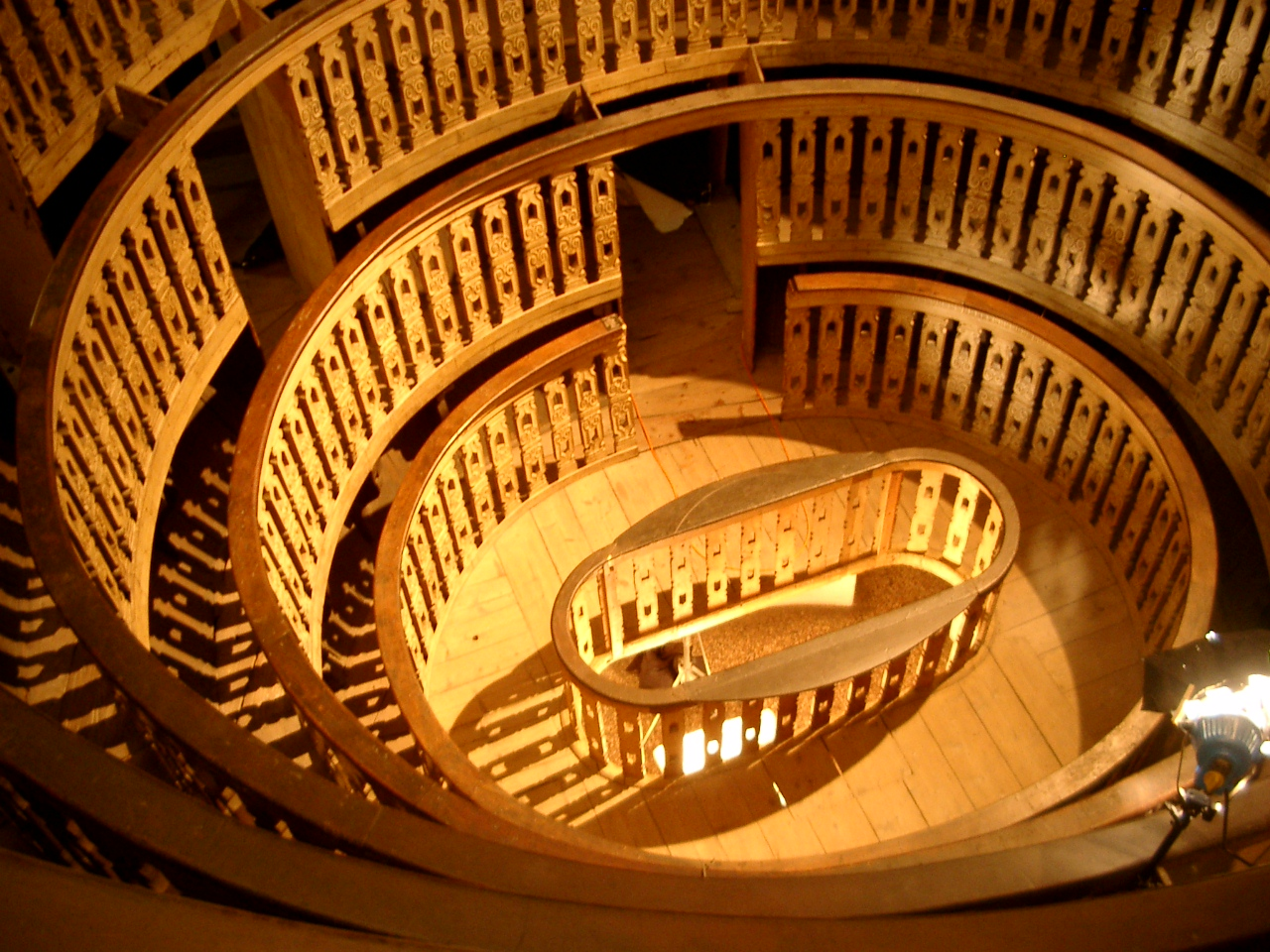
The university houses the oldest surviving permanent anatomical theatre in Europe, dating from 1595

The university began teaching medicine around 1250. It played a leading role in the identification and treatment of diseases and ailments, specializing in autopsies and the inner workings of the body.

Since 1595, Padua's famous anatomical theatre drew artists and scientists studying the human body during public dissections. It is the oldest surviving permanent anatomical theatre in Europe. Anatomist Andreas Vesalius held the chair of Surgery and Anatomy (explicator chirurgiae) and in 1543 published his anatomical discoveries in De Humani Corporis Fabrica. The book triggered great public interest in dissections and caused many other European cities to establish anatomical theatres.

On 25 June 1678, Elena Lucrezia Cornaro Piscopia, a Venetian noblewoman and mathematician, became the first woman to be awarded a Doctor of Philosophy degree.

The university became one of the universities of the Kingdom of Italy in 1873, and ever since has been one of the most prestigious in the country for its contributions to scientific and scholarly research: in the field of mathematics alone, its professors have included such figures as Gregorio Ricci Curbastro, Giuseppe Veronese, Francesco Severi and Tullio Levi Civita.

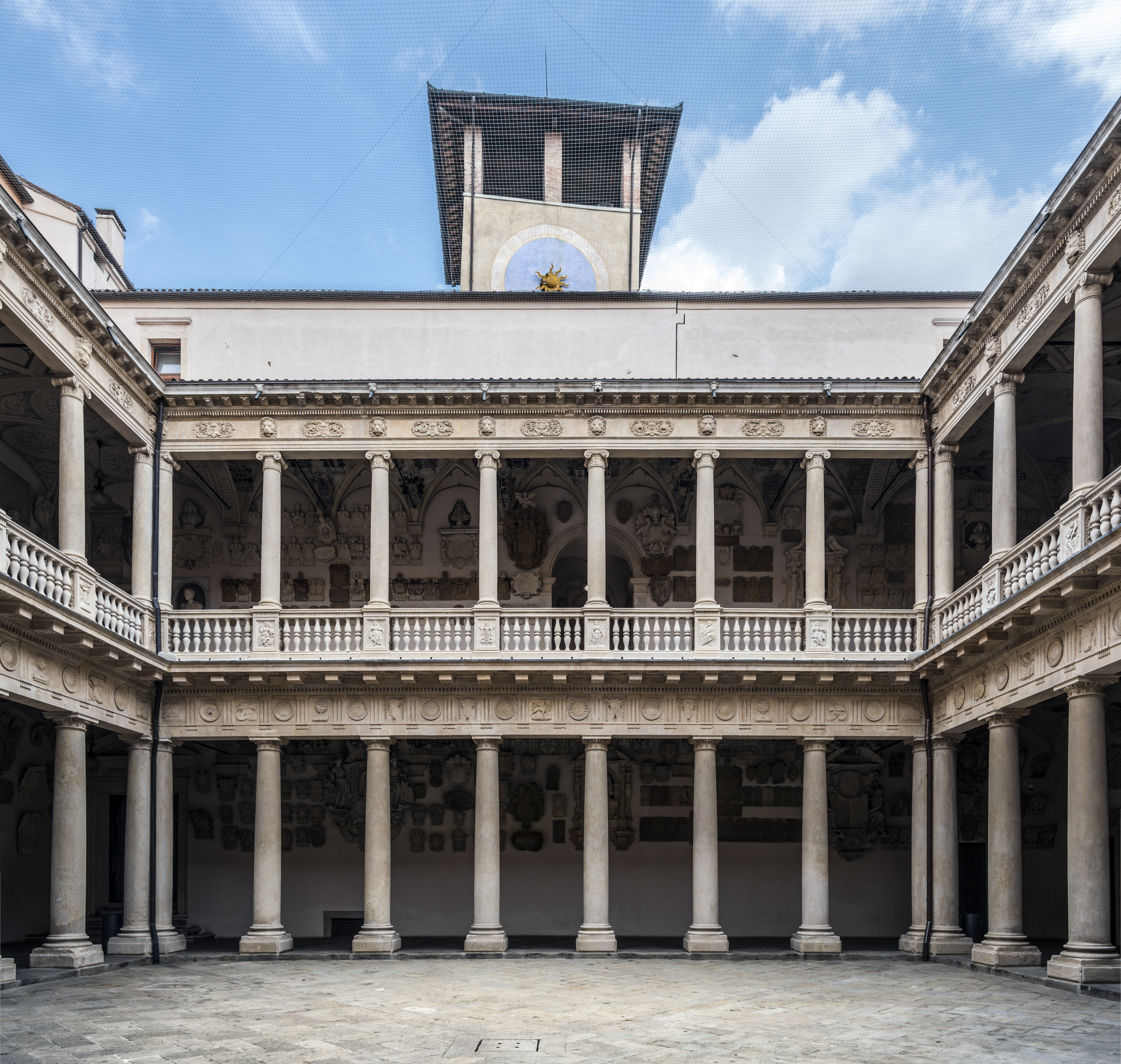
Palazzo Bo is the historical seat of University of Padua since 1493

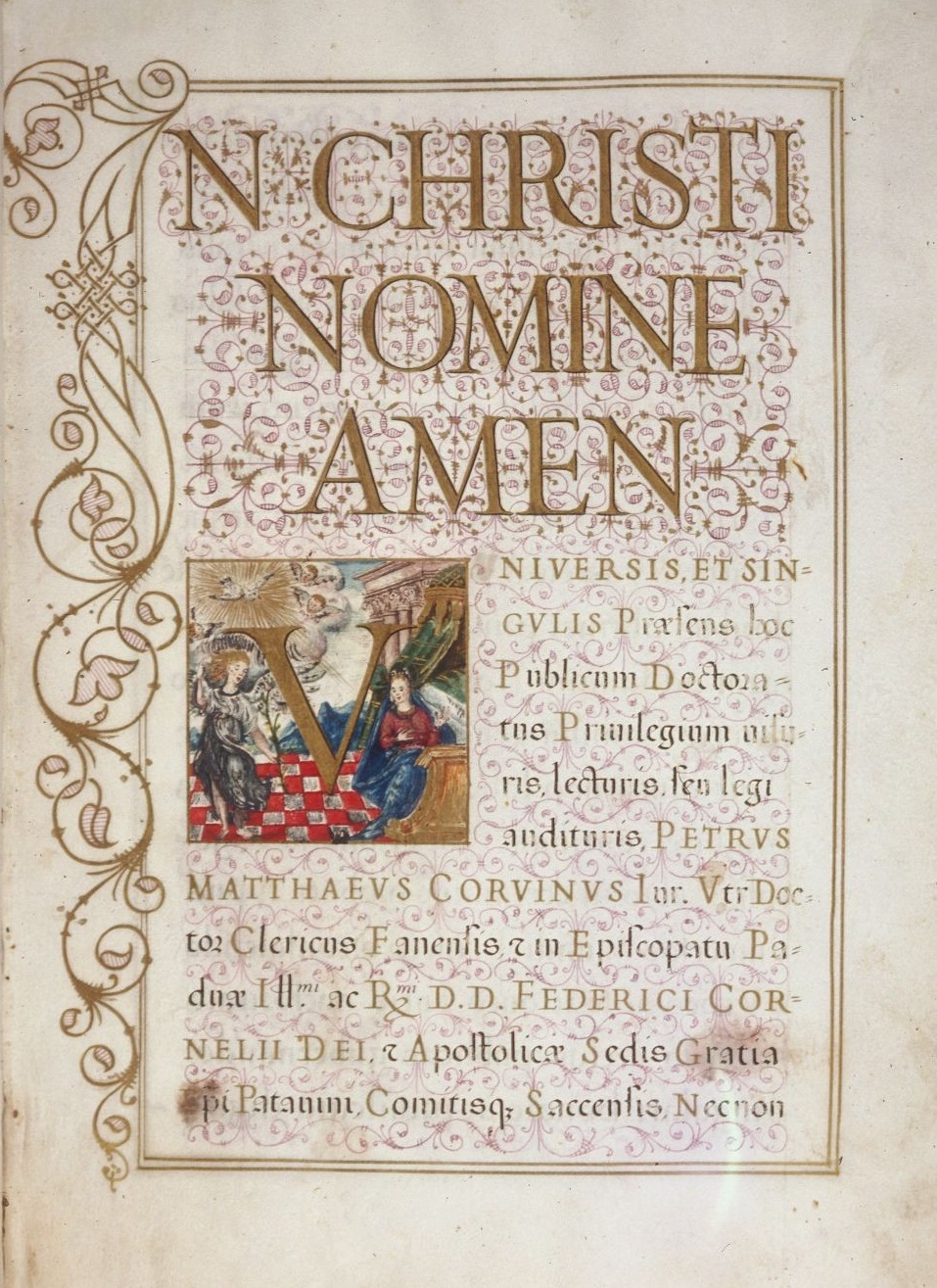
Diploma of Girolamo Martinengo, 1582

The last years of the nineteenth and the first half of the twentieth century saw a reversal of the centralisation process that had taken place in the sixteenth: scientific institutes were set up in what became veritable campuses; a new building to house the Arts and Philosophy faculty was built in another part of the city centre (Palazzo del Liviano, designed by Giò Ponti); the Astro-Physics Observatory was built on the Asiago uplands; and the old Palazzo del Bo was fully restored (1938–1945). The vicissitudes of the Fascist period—political interference, the Race Laws, etc.—had a detrimental effect upon the development of the university, as did the devastation caused by the Second World War and—just a few decades later—the effect of the student protests of 1968–1969 (which the university was left to face without adequate help and support from central government). However, the Gymnasium Omnium Disciplinarum continued its work uninterrupted, and overall the second half of the twentieth century saw a sharp upturn in development—primarily due an interchange of ideas with international institutions of the highest standing (particularly in the fields of science and technology).

In recent years, the university has been able to meet the problems posed by overcrowded facilities by re-deploying over the Veneto as a whole. In 1990, the Institute of Management Engineering was set up in Vicenza, after which the summer courses at Brixen (Bressanone) began once more, and in 1995 the Agripolis centre at Legnaro (for Agricultural Science and Veterinary Medicine) opened. Other sites of re-deployment are at Rovigo, Treviso, Feltre, Castelfranco Veneto, Conegliano, Chioggia and Asiago.

Recent changes in state legislation have also opened the way to greater autonomy for Italian universities, and in 1995 Padua adopted a new Statute that gave it greater independence.

As the publications of conferences and congresses show, the modern-day University of Padua plays an important role in scholarly and scientific research at both a European and world level. Establishing closer links of cooperation and exchange with all the world's major research universities is the direction in which the university intends to move in the future.

== Organization and administration ==
=== Finances ===
The university foresaw a budget of €831 million for the 2023 fiscal year. Of this, €545 million were contributions paid by the Ministry of Education, University and Research of Italy, the European Union, local administrations like regions and provinces, and other entities. The remaining €232 million were classified as own revenues, of which €106 million came from tuition fees and €125 million from research-related income.

The amount of tuition students pay depends on their major, the financial situation of their household and if they take more time to graduate compared to the established length of their program. Tuition is also significantly lowered for non-EU citizens of certain developing countries. There are also scholarships and fee-waivers based on merit on other factors. Generally, most students who are graduating in time and are not from low income households will pay around €2,700/year for the 2023/24 academic year.

== Rankings ==
University rankings
- University of Padua

Global – Overall
- ARWU World: 201–300 (2024)
- CWTS World: 100 (2024)
- QS World: =233 (2026)
- THE World: 201–250 (2024)
- USNWR Global: 130 (2024)

The university is constantly ranked among the best Italian universities.

For 2023, in U.S. News & World Report's World Best Global Universities Rankings, the University of Padua is ranked as the 1st place institution in Italy, taking 43rd place in Europe and the world's 115th. ARWU ranks the university in the Italian top 4, tied for 2nd place with the University of Milan and the University of Pisa under the Sapienza University of Rome. ARWU ranks the university in the 151st – 200th range globally for 2023.

The 2024 Times Higher Education World University Rankings lists the university at 4th place in Italy and in the 201st – 250th range worldwide. QS World University Rankings ranks the university 4th in Italy in 2024 and the best in Italy to study geology and geophysics, earth and sea sciences, biological sciences, psychology, anatomy and physiology. It also places the University of Padua at 219th in the world for 2024. Also, according to QS World University Rankings, the University of Padua is ranked 125th in the field of Medicine.

The NTU ranking, which focuses on productivity and quality of scientific production, places the University of Padua as 82nd worldwide for 2022.

The CWTS Leiden Ranking, based exclusively on bibliometric indicators, places the University of Padua as 2nd place in Italy and 104th worldwide.

== Notable people ==
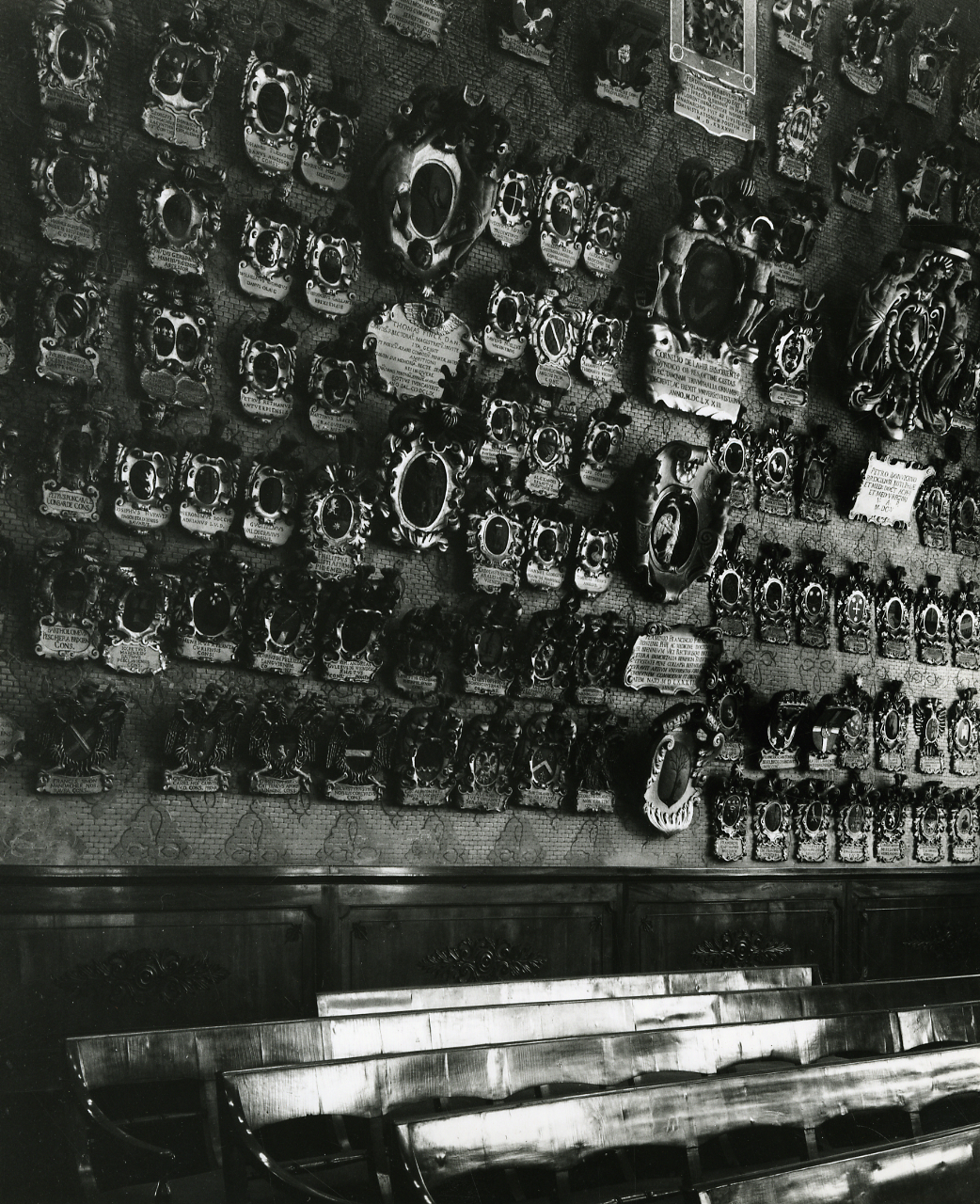
Coats of arms of professors and students in the Aula Magna, Palazzo Bo. Photo by Paolo Monti, 1966

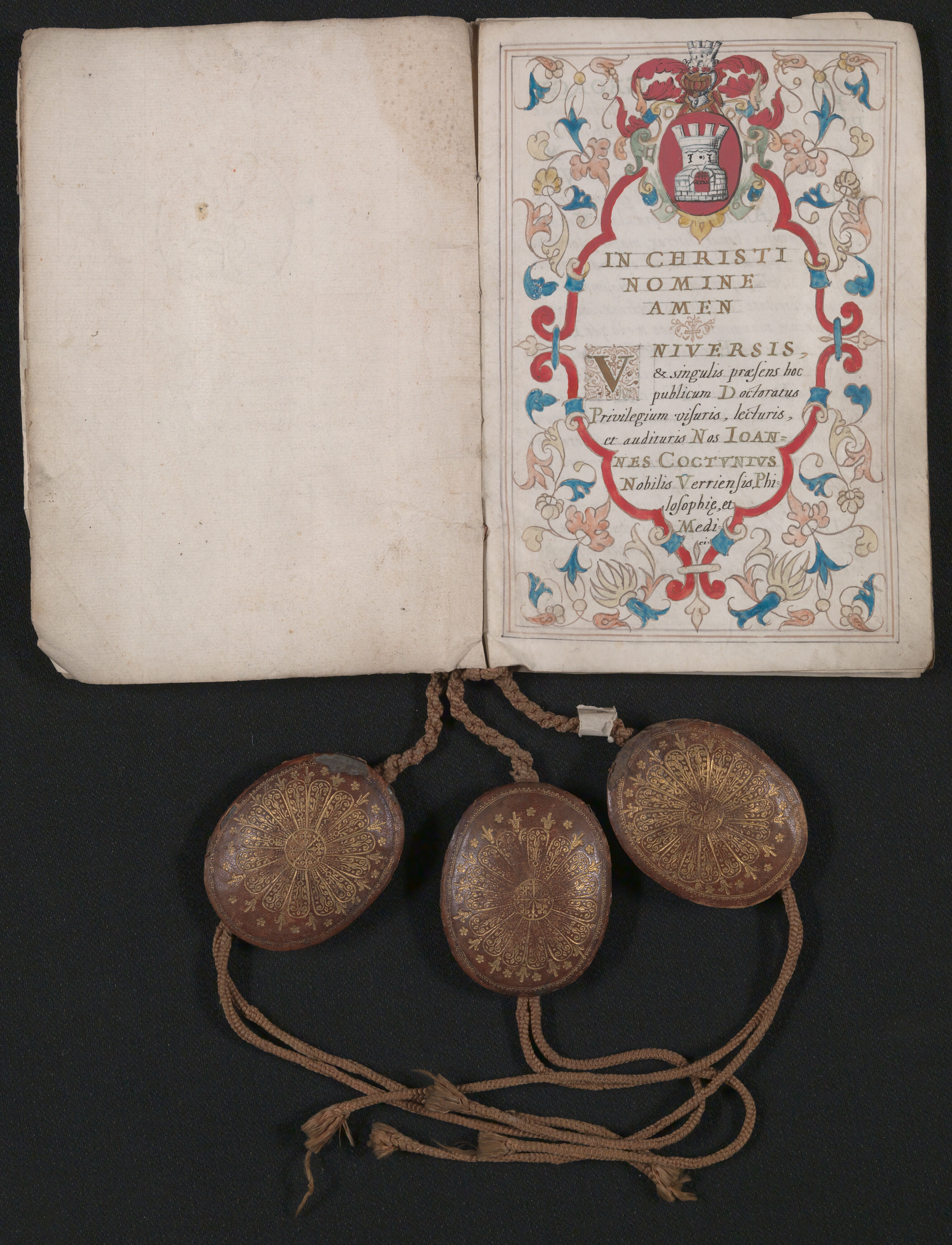
Certificate of medicine of the University of Padua, awarded in 1642 to the Flemish Jan Damman.

=== Alumni ===
Notable people who have attended the University of Padua include:

In natural sciences

- Angelo Azzi biochemist, author and academic
- Nicolaus Copernicus (1473–1543) Polish mathematician and astronomer, placed Sun at center of Solar System
- John Caius (1510–1573) English physician
- Vesalius (1514–1564) known as founder of modern human anatomy; offered professorship at Padua, but died
- Gabriele Falloppio (1523–1562) anatomist; anatomy of head and internal ear; reproductive organs
- William Harvey (1578–1657) anatomist; described function of heart and circulatory system
- George Ent (1604–1689) English anatomist, supporter of Harvey
- Thomas Browne (1605–1682) English writer and physician
- Sir Edward Greaves (1608–1680) English physician.
- Nathaniel Eaton (1610–1674), Ph.D. and M.D., first Head Master of Harvard College
- Tommaso Perelli (1704–1783), Italian astronomer
- Federico Faggin (1941–) designer of the first commercial microprocessor
- Mario Rizzetto (1945–) Italian virologist; worked with Hepatitis D virus
- Petros Kestoras (1957–) Cypriot diplomat

In politics and government

- Ludovico Trevisan (1401–1465), Cardinal, Camerlengo of the Holy Roman Church, Archbishop of Florence, Patriarch of Aquileia, Captain General of the Church, and physician.
- Sir Francis Walsingham (ca 1532–1590) spymaster for Queen Elizabeth I
- Jan Zamoyski (1542–1605), Polish nobleman, magnate, diplomat and statesman
- Seneschal Constantine Cantacuzino Stolnic (c. 1650–1716), Romanian nobleman and humanist scholar who held high offices in the Principality of Wallachia. Author of a History of Wallachia (unfinished), he was the first Romanian to ever graduate from this prestigious university.
- Ioannis Kapodistrias (1776–1831), 1st Governor of Greece, Foreign Minister of the Russian Empire
- Alexandros Mavrokordatos (1791–1865), Prime Minister of Greece
- Isacco Pesaro Maurogonato (1817–1892), financier, member of the Italian Chamber of Deputies
- Luigi Luzzatti (1841–1927), financier, political economist, social philosopher and jurist, 20th Prime Minister of Italy
- Abdirahman Jama Barre (1937–2017), Foreign Minister of Somalia
- Daniele Franco (1953–), Italian economist, Draghi Cabinet Finance Minister.

In science, mathematics and engineering

- Luigi Dall'Igna (1966–), engineer and general manager of Ducati Corse

In arts, theology and literature

- Saint Albertus Magnus (d.1280)
- Mikołaj Kiczka (around 1382–1429), nobleman, diplomat and priest
- Francesco Barbaro (1390–1454), humanist
- Nicolas of Cusa (1401–1464), in canon law. German philosopher, theologian, jurist, and astronomer.
- Sixtus IV (1414-1484), Cardinal, Pope of the Roman Catholic Church, studied between 1441-1444 as Francesco da Savona, receiving a doctorate of Theology and Philosophy in 1444
- Ermolao Barbaro (1454–1493), Italian renaissance scholar
- Sir John Tiptoft (1458–1464), Earl of Worcester
- Pietro Pomponazzi (1462–1525), natural philosopher
- Giovanni Pico (1463–1494), humanist
- Pietro Bembo (1470–1547), Venetian poet and cardinal, humanist
- Francysk Skaryna (1470–1551/1552), printer of the first book in an Eastern Slavic language
- Reginald Pole (1500–1558), cardinal
- Cardinal Stanislaus Hosius (1504–1579)
- Daniele Barbaro (1514–1570), translator of Vitruvius
- Pomponio Algerio (1531–1556), student of civil law (1550s) executed under the Roman Catholic Inquisition
- Jacopo Zabarella (1533–1589), physics, metaphysics, and mathematics.
- George Acworth (1534–1578?), Anglican priest and civil lawyer
- Torquato Tasso (1544–1595), poet
- Theophilos Corydalleus (1563–1546) Greek Neo-Aristotelian philosopher, started Korydalism.
- István Szamosközy (1565–1612), humanist and historian from Transylvania, the leading figure of Hungarian historiography at the beginning of the 17th century
- Saint Francis de Sales (1567–1622), double doctorate "in utroque jure", that is, in canon and civil law (1591)
- Roger Manners (1576–1612), 5th Earl of Rutland and poet and abettor of Essex's Rebellion
- Angelus Silesius (1624–1677), German priest, physician and poet
- Elena Cornaro Piscopia (1646–1684), first woman to receive a doctor of philosophy degree
- Giuseppe Tartini (1692–1770), musician and composer
- Moses Hayyim Luzzatto (1707–1746), kabbalist and playwright, founder of Hebrew literature
- Giacomo Casanova (1725–1798), traveller, author and seducer
- Athanasios Christopoulos (1772-1847), poet, high-ranking boyar in Wallachia, Minister of Justice ("Logofăt al Judecății")
- Ugo Foscolo (1778–1827), Italian writer, revolutionary, and poet
- Edgar Manas (1875–1964), composer
- Carlo Crespi Croci (1891–1982), Italian priest, anthropologist, and filmmaker
- Boris Pahor (1913–2022), writer

=== Notable faculty ===
- Sixtus IV (1414-1484), intermittent lecturer of Logic and Philosophy between 1444 and 1449
- Ermolao Barbaro (1454–1493), appointed professor of philosophy in 1477
- Leonik Tomeu (1456–1531), first to teach Aristotle in original Greek
- Jacopo Zabarella (1533–1589) held chairs of logic, and philosophy, from 1564 to 1589
- Galileo Galilei (1564–1642) held chair of mathematics between 1592 and 1610
- Elena Cornaro Piscopia (1646–1684), mathematics lecturer, and the first woman to receive a PhD degree
- Antonio Vallisneri (1661–1730) held chairs of practical medicine, and theoretical medicine, between 1700 and 1730
- Giovanni Battista Morgagni (1681–1771) held chairs of theoretical medicine, and anatomy, between 1711 and 1771
- Tullio Levi-Civita (1873–1941) held the chair of Rational Mechanics, famous for his work on the absolute differential calculus (tensor calculus) and many other important contributions in the area of Pure and Applied Mathematics
- Concetto Marchesi (1878–1957) rector from 1943 to 1953
- Sergio Bettini (1905–1986) professor of History of Medieval Art and History of Art Criticism
- Gianfranco Folena (1920–1992) Professor of the History of the Italian Language
- Gian Piero Brunetta (1942–) Professor of cinema history and criticism
- Patrizia Pontisso (1955–) Professor of internal medicine
- Massimo Marchiori (1970–) Assoc. Prof. (2006–); Italian computer scientist and inventor of Hypersearch
- Emilio Quaia Professor of radiology
- Ines Testoni Professor of Social Psychology

== Departments ==
The University of Padua offers a wide range of degrees, organized by Departments:

- Department of Agronomy, Food, Natural Resources, Animals and the Environment
- Department of Biology
- Department of Animal Medicine, Production and Health
- Department of Biomedical Sciences
- Department of Cardiac, Thoracic and Vascular Sciences
- Department of Chemical Sciences
- Department of Civil, Environmental and Architectural Engineering
- Department of Communication Sciences
- Department of Comparative Biomedicine and Food Science
- Department of Cultural Heritage: Archaeology and History of Art, Cinema and Music
- Department of Developmental Psychology and Socialisation
- Department of Economics and Management
- Department of General Psychology
- Department of Geosciences
- Department of Historical and Geographic Sciences and the Ancient World
- Department of Industrial Engineering
- Department of Information Engineering
- Department of Land, Environment, Agriculture and Forestry
- Department of Linguistic and Literary Studies
- Department of Management and Engineering
- Department of Mathematics
- Department of Medicine
- Department of Molecular Medicine
- Department of Neurosciences
- Department of Pharmaceutical and Pharmacological Sciences
- Department of Philosophy, Sociology, Education and Applied Psychology
- Department of Physics and Astronomy
- Department of Political and Juridical Sciences and International Studies
- Department of Private Law and Critique of Law
- Department of Public, International and Community Law
- Department of Statistical Sciences
- Department of Surgery, Oncology and Gastroenterology
- Department of Women's and Children's Health

== Schools ==
Departments have been united in a limited number of Schools:

- Agricultural science and Veterinary medicine
- Economics and Political sciences
- Engineering
- Human and social sciences and cultural heritage
- Law
- Medicine and surgery
- Psychology
- Sciences

== See also ==
- List of oldest universities in continuous operation
- List of Italian universities
- List of medieval universities
- List of split up universities
- ICoN Interuniversity Consortium for Italian Studies
- Padua
- Coimbra Group
- Top Industrial Managers for Europe
