= Patrizia Pontisso =

Italian researcher

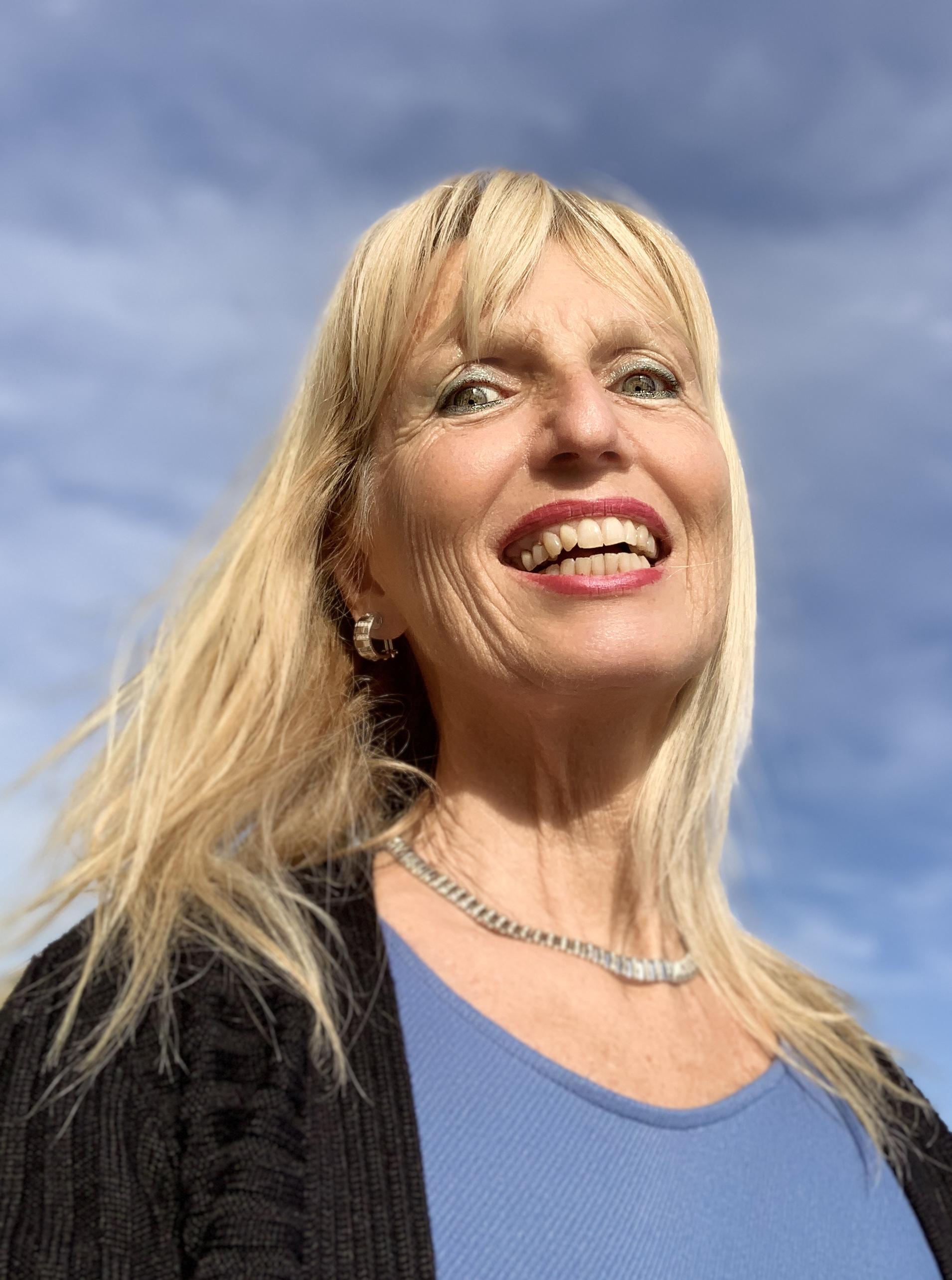
- Born: May 16, 1955 (age 71); Morsano al Tagliamento, Italy
- Occupations: Researcher, internist and academic

Academic background
- Education: Bachelors of Medicine and Surgery; Specialization in Internal Medicine and in Clinical and Laboratory Hematology
- Alma mater: University of Padua

Academic work
- Institutions: University of Padua

Patrizia Pontisso (born May 16, 1955) is an Italian researcher, internist and academic. She is Professor of Internal Medicine at the University of Padua.

She has published over 280 research articles and has several patents to her name. Pontisso is the former National Secretary of the Italian Association for the Study of the Liver (AISF). She is an active Member of several specialized Italian and international medical associations. Since 2019, she is the Educational Dean of the International Course of Medicine and Surgery at the University of Padua.

== Education ==
After obtaining her High School Diploma, Pontisso attended the University of Padua as an Internal Student from 1977 at the General Pathology Institute and then at the Medical Pathology Unit of the Padua Teaching Hospital. In 1980, she graduated in Medicine and Surgery at the University of Padua and obtained the Diploma of Specialty in Internal Medicine from the same university in 1985. In 1988, she received her Diploma of Specialty in Clinical and Laboratory Hematology. From 1983 till 1985 she carried out research at the Pasteur Institute in Paris and from 1986 to 1987 she conducted research work at Rush University in Chicago.

== Career ==
In 2006, Pontisso was appointed as associate professor of Internal Medicine at the University of Padua. Since 2002, she is the leader of the research group of Molecular Hepatology of the Medical Clinic 5 and responsible for the Liver Biobank.

Pontisso also held several clinical and organizational appointments. She carries out medical activity in the field of Internal Medicine and Hepatology and she serves as Coordinator in charge of the Outpatient Services of the Medical Clinic 5 and of the Regional Reference Center for Liver Diseases at the Padua Teaching Hospital. In 2015, she was appointed Director of the Interdepartmental Research Center of Experimental Surgery.

== Research ==
Pontisso's research areas include natural history and therapy of chronic liver diseases, pathogenesis and molecular markers of primary liver cancer, molecular studies on hepatitis B virus and hepatitis C virus along with genomic analysis and functional studies of viral proteins.

Pontisso's research career started with the study of molecular biology of hepatitis B virus and characterization of new recombinant vaccines at the Pasteur Institute of Paris.

In early 1990s, Pontisso shifted her research focus on hepatitis C virus and provided the first evidences of clinical differences of HCV genotypes. She then conducted research on the mechanisms of carcinogenesis, identifying new tumor markers for liver cancer. Her research results provided information regarding the pathogenesis and progression of disease, highlighting the role of the SerpinB3 molecule in tumors of the liver, esophagus and colon. Her studies have led to the development of new technologies that involve the use of functionalized nano compounds for the diagnosis and treatment of early stage liver cancer.

Pontisso has also conducted research on regenerative medicine and on the use of extracellular vesicles engineered to over-express SerpinB3. There are several patents registered in Pontisso's name including 'Diagnosis of liver cancer based on detecting SCCA1 protein' in 2003 and 'Serpinb3 Inhibitor for Cancer Treatment' in 2019.
