= Vincent Manago =

French painter

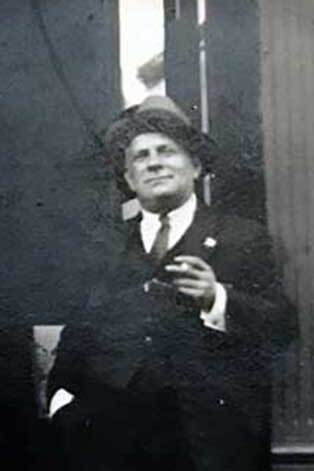
- c.1930
- Born: Vincent Manago; 15 January 1880; Toulon, France
- Died: 30 June 1936 (aged 56); Paris, France
- Education: Académie Julian, Paris
- Known for: Drawing and painting
- Notable work: Woman Preparing Couscous, Le Marché à Saint Tropez, Place en Afrique du Nord
- Movement: Orientalism
- Patrons: Jean-Paul Laurens

Vincent Manago (1880–1936) was a French painter specialised on landscapes, marines and genre paintings of the Mediterranean coast (Port de Martigues, La Rochelle, Venice) of oriental style. His son, Armand, was also a painter who married the scientist Marianne Grunberg-Manago.

== Biography and career ==
Vincent Manago was born April 4, 1878 in Toulon and died August 25, 1936 (aged 58) in Paris. He studied at the Academie Julian with Jean-Paul Laurens and was very popular in Marseille between 1900 and 1913 when he left for North Africa. He travelled and worked in Algiers and Tunis which showed in the vibrant colours and thick impasto of his paintings. As other Orientalist artists, he also used postcards as inspiration. One such postcard, Négresse pétrissant la Galette dans la Guessâa (Collections ND. Phot., Librairie d'Amico, Tunis) was used for his 1903 painting of a street scene of a young woman sorting through couscous in a clay bowl. At least four different versions of this painting were made, one of which is in the Musée des beaux-arts de Marseille.

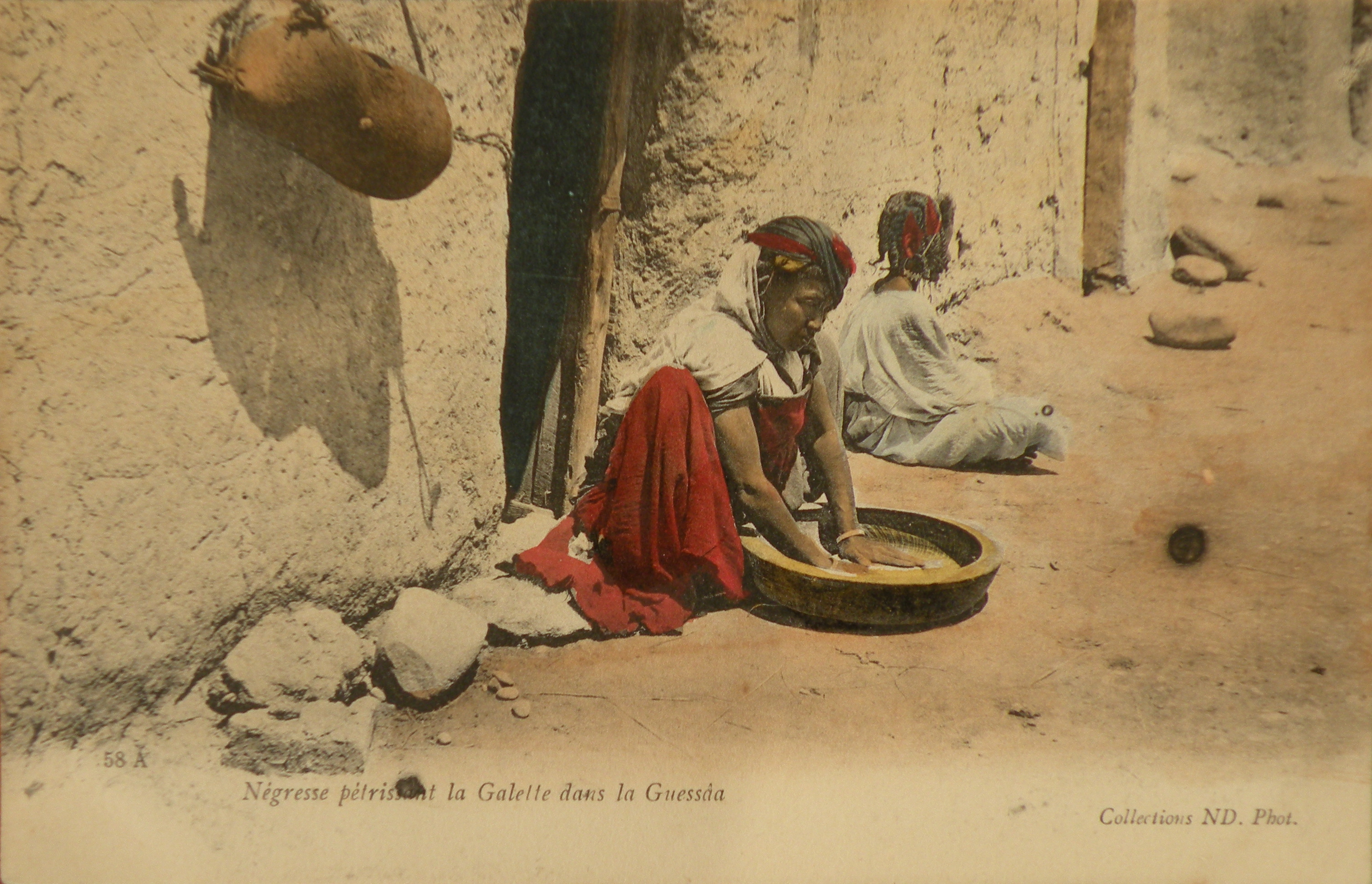
Post card - woman stirring couscous in a clay plate in Algeria, ND. Phot. 58A

He also painted landscapes of Provence and the Mediterranean coast, including the port of Martigues and the city of Venice.

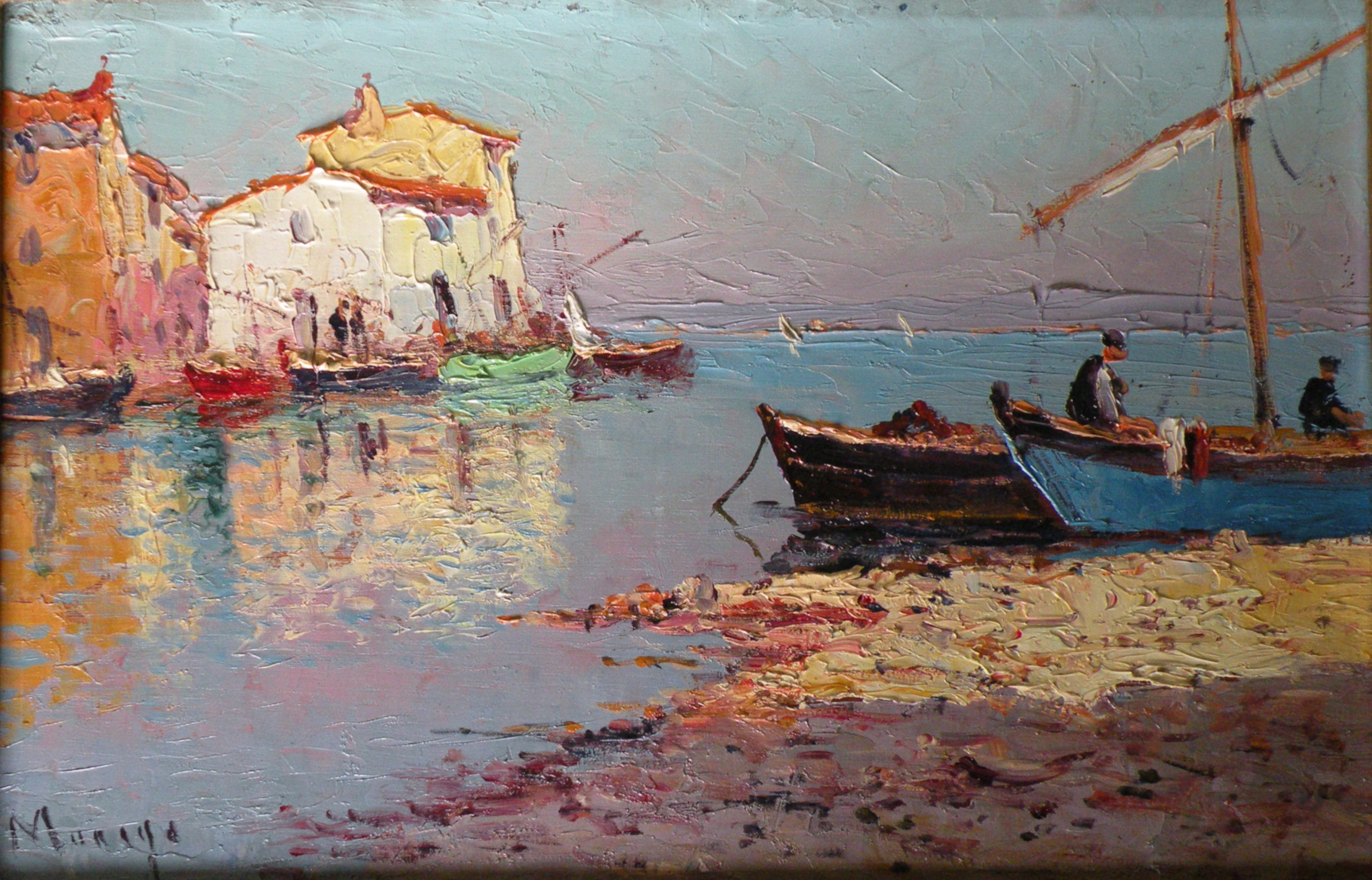
Vincent Manago - View of the port of Martigues, France

His work was shown at the Colonial exhibition of Marseille in 1922 and at the Paris Colonial Exposition in 1931.

In addition to being a painter, Manago also worked as a decorator of several private residences in Tunis and Algiers.

His paintings can be found in France, at the Musée Baron Martin in Gray, the Musée Cantini, and the Musée des Beaux Arts in Marseille.

His oldest son Dominique Manago, born in Tunis in 1902, also became a painter and so did his youngest son Armand, born in Paris in 1913, who changed his artist name to A.Manago Guérin. when he married the noted scientist Marianne Grunberg-Manago. Vincent Manago lived in Paris until his death on 30 June 1936.

== Selected paintings ==
- Maisons de pecheurs et barques a Martiques, no date.
- Vue du port de Martigues, no date. Oil on canvas, 33x46 cm.
- Prière du soir au Maroc (Evening prayer in Morocco), no date. Oil on wood panel, 46x77 cm.
- Le grand Canal à Venise (Grand Canal in Venice), no date. Oil on canvas, 47x69 cm.
- Rue animée à Tunis (Street view in Tunis), no date. Oil on panel, 46x61 cm.
- La Rochelle, no date. Oil on panel, 46x55 cm.
- Retour du marché (Return from the market), no date. Oil on canvas, 46x38 cm.
- Scène de rue en Algérie (Street scene in Algeria), 1903. Oil on canvas, 41x61 cm. Musée Cantini, Marseille, France.

== See also ==
- List of Orientalist artists
- Orientalism
