= Molecular and Cellular Probes =

- Discipline: Biotechnology
- Language: English
- Edited by: A. Fox

Publication details
- History: 1987-present
- Publisher: Elsevier
- Frequency: Bimonthly
- Impact factor: 1.869 (2010)

Standard abbreviations
- ISO 4: Mol. Cell. Probes

Indexing
- ISSN: 0890-8508

Links
- Journal homepage; Online access

Molecular and Cellular Probes is a peer-reviewed scientific journal covering research on the location, diagnosis, and monitoring of inherited and infectious disease utilizing genomic, proteomic, and immunological techniques.

== Abstracting and indexing ==
The journal is abstracted and indexed in BIOSIS, Biotechnology Citation Index, Chemical Abstracts, Current Contents/Life Sciences, EMBASE, EMBiology, MEDLINE, and Scopus. According to the Journal Citation Reports, the journal has a 2013 impact factor of 1.859.
