= Molecular and Cellular Endocrinology =

- Discipline: Endocrinology
- Language: English
- Edited by: C. Klinge, C. Stratakis, R. Laybutt

Publication details
- History: 1974–present
- Publisher: Elsevier
- Frequency: 20/year
- Impact factor: 4.102 (2020)

Standard abbreviations
- ISO 4: Mol. Cell. Endocrinol.

Indexing
- ISSN: 0303-7207

Links
- Journal homepage

Molecular and Cellular Endocrinology is a peer-reviewed academic journal of endocrinology established in 1974. The journal is published by Elsevier, and edited by C. Klinge, C. Stratakis, and R. Laybutt.

== Indexing ==
Molecular and Cellular Endocrinology in indexed in:

- BIOSIS
- Current Contents/Life Sciences
- EMBASE
- MEDLINE
- Scopus
