= International Union of Biochemistry and Molecular Biology =

International non-governmental organization

- IUBMB
- Abbreviation: IUBMB
- Formation: 1955; 71 years ago
- Type: INGO, standards organization
- Region served: Worldwide
- Official language: English
- President: Dario Alessi (United Kingdom)
- Website: iubmb.org

The International Union of Biochemistry and Molecular Biology (IUBMB) is an international non-governmental organisation concerned with biochemistry and molecular biology. Formed in 1955 as the International Union of Biochemistry (IUB), the union has presently 79 member countries and regions (as of 2020). The Union is devoted to promoting research and education in biochemistry and molecular biology throughout the world, and gives particular attention to localities where the subject is still in its early development.

== History ==
The first Congress of Biochemistry was held in 1949 in Cambridge, UK, organized by the Biochemical Society, and was inspired by German-born British biochemist Sir Hans Adolf Krebs as a means of bringing together biochemists who had been separated by World War II. At the time, biochemistry was blossoming as a discipline and was seeking its own recognition as a union within the International Council for Science (ICSU). The congress was a first step to recognize biochemistry as a separate discipline and entity. At the final session of this congress, the International Committee of Biochemistry was set up with 20 members from fourteen countries with the goal obtaining from the ICSU 'recognition as the international body representative of biochemistry, with a view to the formal constitution of an International Union of Biochemistry as soon as possible.' Discussions continued over the next few years, and by the third Congress of Biochemistry, which took place in Brussels in 1955, the International Union of Biochemistry (IUB) was formed and officially admitted to the ICSU. In 1991, the IUB changed its name to the International Union of Biochemistry and Molecular Biology (IUBMB).

== Members ==
The IUBMB unites biochemists and molecular biologists in 75 countries that belong to the IUBMB as an "Adhering Body" or "Associate Adhering Body" represented by a biochemical society, a national research council or an academy of sciences. It also represents the regional organizations, Federation of Asian Oceanian Biochemists and Molecular Biologists (FAOBMB), Federation of European Biochemical Societies (FEBS), and Pan-American Society for Biochemistry and Molecular Biology (PABMB).

== Meetings ==
IUBMB organizes a triennial Congress of Biochemistry and Molecular Biology and sponsors three annual focussed meetings. In addition, it supports symposia, educational activities (including the Tang Fellowships), award lectures (including Jubilee Lectures), and travel grants for students around the world.

== Fellowships ==
The IUBMB is committed to providing training opportunities to biochemists and molecular biologists around the world. The Wood Whelan Research fellowship, established in honor of past-Presidents Harland G. Wood and William Joseph Whelan, provides opportunities for students to travel to a laboratory in a different country to work on a specified project. Mid Career Fellowships provide a similar opportunity to early career investigators. The IUBMB collaborates with American Society of Biochemistry and Molecular Biology to offer PROLAB fellowships to provide opportunities for Latin American students to study in the US.

== Biochemical nomenclature ==
The IUBMB publishes standards on biochemical nomenclature, including Enzyme Commission number nomenclature, in some cases jointly with the International Union of Pure and Applied Chemistry (IUPAC). The enzyme nomenclature scheme was developed in 1955 at the International Congress of Biochemistry and, with the addition of translocases in 2018, contains 7 classes of enzymes.

== Publications ==
The IUBMB is associated with the journals IUBMB Life, Biochemistry and Molecular Biology Education (formerly Biochemical Education), BioFactors, Biotechnology and Applied Biochemistry, Molecular Aspects of Medicine and Trends in Biochemical Sciences. The publishing program supports the IUBMB's mission of fostering growth and advancement of biochemistry and molecular biology as the foundation from which the biomolecular sciences derive their basic ideas and techniques in the service of humanity.

== Leadership ==
Presidents
Nr.	Term	President	From
21.	2024–2027	Dario Alessi	United Kingdom
20.	2021–2024	Alexandra Newton	Canada & United States & United Kingdom
19.	2018–2021	Andrew H. J. Wang	Taiwan
18.	2015–2018	Joan J. Guinovart	Spain
17.	2012–2015	Gregory Petsko	United States
16.	2007–2012	Angelo Azzi	Switzerland & United States
15.	2006	George L. Kenyon	United States
14.	2003–2006	Mary Osborn	United Kingdom & Germany
13.	2000–2003	Brian F.C. Clark	Denmark
12.	1997–2000	William Joseph Whelan	United Kingdom & United States
11.	1994–97	Kunio Yagi (ja)	Japan
10.	1991–94	Hans L. Komberg	United Kingdom
9.	1988–91	E.C. (Bill) Slater	Netherlands
8.	1985–88	Marianne Grunberg-Manago	France
7.	1979–85	Harland G. Wood	United States
6.	1979	Feodor Lynen	Germany
5.	1976–79	Aleksander A. Bayev (ru)	Russia
4.	1973–76	Osamu Hayaishi	Japan
3.	1967–73	A. Hugo T. Theorell	Sweden
2.	1961–67	Severo Ochoa	Spain & United States
1.	1955–61	Marcel Florkin	Belgium

== See also ==
- EC number
- Federation of European Biochemical Societies
- IUPAC nomenclature of organic chemistry
- Nomenclature
