= Testone =

Testone is an Italian surname. Notable people with the surname include:

- Elise Testone (born 1983), American singer-songwriter
- Gaspare Testone (1704–1801), Italian painter and architect

== See also ==
- Testoni, surname
