= Ines Testoni =

Italian psychologist, psychotherapist and author

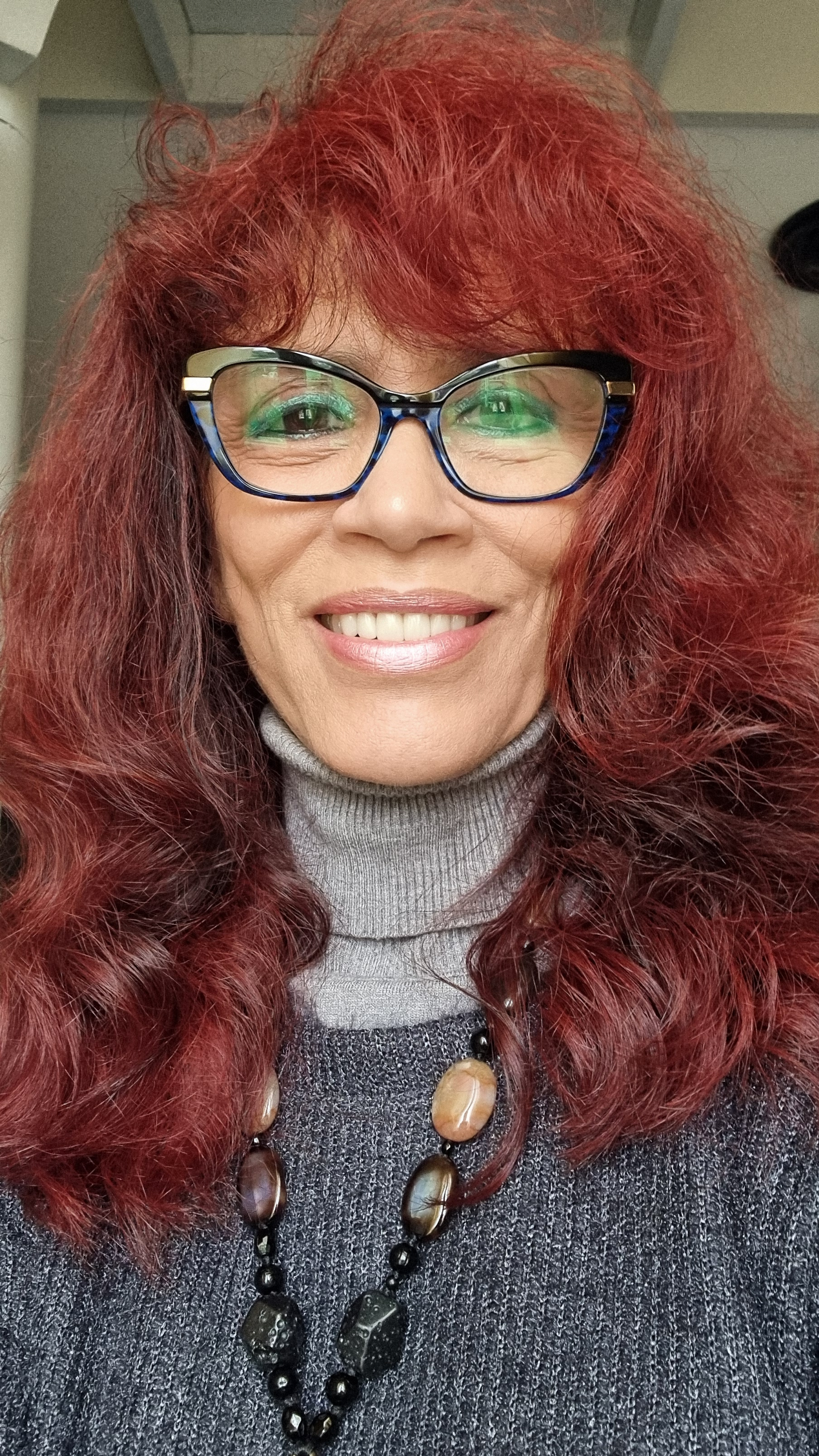
- Occupations: Psychologist, psychotherapist, author and academic

Academic background
- Education: Master's degree in Clinical Psychology (University of Padua, Italy); Master's degree in Theoretical Philosophy (Ca' Foscari University of Venice); Specialization in Cultural Anthropology

Academic work
- Institutions: University of Padua
- Website: https://inestestoni.it/

Ines Testoni is an Italian psychologist, psychotherapist, author, and academic. She is a professor of Social Psychology at University of Padova. She is also research fellow at the Department of Creative Arts Therapies at University of Haifa and directs Specialization programs in Death and End of Life Studies as well as Creative Arts Therapies for Resilience at University of Padova.

Testoni's research focuses on three main fields of research with her primary research area being the social psychology of death and dying, particularly on mourning elaboration through counseling and creative arts therapies, as well as the construction of representations of death in various contexts of suffering. Her other two research areas include gender based violence and philosophy and epistemology. She is most known for her researches in the field of death education. She has authored 20 books and 250 articles. She received the Movimento Hospice Marche Prize at the Fino alla Fine festival.

Testoni is an Editor for the Frontiers in Psychology, Scientific Reports (of Nature), as well as Director of the Endlife Notebook Series at Padua University Press.

== Education ==
After earning her master's degree in Clinical Psychology with a focus on Application from University of Padova in 1989, Testoni pursued a specialization in Clinical and Theory of Systemic Therapy at the Gregory Bateson Center, Niguarda Ca' Granda Hospital in Milan. In 1995, she completed a second master's degree in Theoretical Philosophy at the University of Ca' Foscari in Venice. She also pursued a Specialization in Cultural Anthropology at University of Padova.

== Career ==
In the area of gender based violence studies, Testoni served as the Project Director Manager for the European Daphne project "EMPOWER," which focused on domestic violence against women and participated in the project "Return to the Roots? Gender, Identity, and Integration in Contemporary Brazilian Immigration to Italy".

Testoni is part of Division 36 and Division 10 at the American Psychological Association (APA). She has served as a Professor and Researcher in Social Psychology at FISPPA.

== Research ==
Testoni's research encompasses four areas: death studies, where she explores adult attachment theories, grief processing, counseling, and therapy, as well as the impact of death on self-harm behaviors like drug addiction, anorexia, and suicide; gender studies and gender-based violence, focusing on domestic violence and the treatment of victims and perpetrators; and psychodrama and sociodrama, emphasizing interventions and support for coping with death, dying, and domestic violence, alongside preventive educational practices against gender-based violence and philosophy and epistemology from the eternalist perspective of Emanuele Severino.

Testoni reviewed the emerging field of thanatology, tracing its historical development and highlighting the growing need for death studies and education. In a collaborative work, she validated a new attitude scale that combines psychological and philosophical views on death, finding that seeing death as annihilation is linked to greater hopelessness and reduced resilience. She also researched how the perceived meaning of life and views on death impact psychological distress, finding that seeing death as a passage rather than annihilation is associated with lower distress levels in both healthy individuals and cancer patients. Her study on pet loss showed that factors like attachment to pets, death representations, and beliefs about an afterlife affect grief and depression, emphasizing the need for improved psychological support. Additionally, she contributed to an international study on the Meaning-centered Coping Scale's effectiveness in predicting mental and physical health outcomes during early COVID-19.

Testoni evaluated the experiences of 17 lesbian mothers in Italy, showing how the lack of legal recognition impacts their parenting, partner relationships, and interactions with public agencies. She also assessed a gender-sensitive intervention using photo-based therapy and psychodrama with male prisoners convicted of violence against women, finding a shift from hostile sexism to a more benevolent view of masculinity, emphasizing emotional value and empathy.

== Works ==
In the field of death studies, Testoni authored operas, including L’ultima nascita: Psicologia del morire e death education and Psicologia palliativa. These manuals on thanatology, palliative care, and pain therapy in Italy addressed end-of-life care, legislative frameworks, and cultural contexts. In the book Il Grande Libro della Morte, she investigated cultural and historical views on death in emphasizing the importance of confronting death meaningfully to live more fully. In the essay collection Vedere Oltre, co-authored with Guidalberto Bormolini, Enzo Pace, and Luigi Vero Tarca, she explored dying and the afterlife through various religious and human science perspectives.

Focusing her research efforts on gender based violence, Testoni authored La Frattura Originaria, which examined how Western nihilism and ancient Greek thought have contributed to gender imbalances, particularly women's subordination. She was the editor of Daphne and the Centaurs alongside Caterina Arcidiacono and Angelika Groterath which examined the roots of gender-based violence and strategies to address it through socio-cultural analysis and psychological interventions. Her 2023 book, Il Terzo Sesso explored the origins and perpetuation of gender divisions, challenging the traditional binary of man and woman.

Testoni's study of philosophy and epistemology resulted in co-authorship of Artificial Intelligence Versus Natural Intelligence, which delved into a dialogue between Roger Penrose and Emanuele Severino on the comparison between artificial and natural intelligence, discussing the relationship between intelligence and consciousness. She edited and co-authored Eternity Between Space and Time: From Consciousness To The Cosmos, exploring dialogue with physicists (including Roger Penrose, Gerard T'Hooft, Federico Faggin and Gabriele Veneziano), theologians, philosophers and psychologists.

== Awards and honors ==
- 2017 – Movimento Hospice Marche Prize, Fino alla Fine

== Bibliography ==
=== Selected books ===
- La Frattura Originaria: Psicologia della Mafia tra Nichilismo e Omnicrazia Prefazione di Emanuele Severino (2008) ISBN 978-8820741556
- Daphne and the Centaurs Overcoming Gender Based Violence (2013) ISBN 978-3847401247
- Vedere Oltre: La Spiritualità Dinanzi al Morire nelle Diverse Religioni (2014) ISBN 978-8867084067
- L'Ultima Nascita. Psicologia del Morire e Death Education (2015) ISBN 978-8833958835
- Psicologia Palliativa: Intorno all’Ultimo Compito Evolutivo (2020) ISBN 978-8833933788
- Il Grande Libro della Morte: Miti e Riti dalla Preistoria ai Cyborg (2021) ISBN 978-8842828419
- Artificial Intelligence Versus Natural Intelligence (2022) ISBN 978-3030854829
- Il Terzo Sesso: Perché Dio non è Maschio e Altre Questioni di Genere (2023) ISBN 978-8842831723

=== Selected articles ===
- Fonseca, L. M., & Testoni, I. (2012). The emergence of thanatology and current practice in death education. OMEGA-Journal of Death and Dying, 64(2), 157–169.
- Testoni, I., Ancona, D., & Ronconi, L. (2015). The ontological representation of death: A scale to measure the idea of annihilation versus passage. OMEGA-Journal of Death and Dying, 71(1), 60–81.
- Testoni, I., De Cataldo, L., Ronconi, L., & Zamperini, A. (2017). Pet loss and representations of death, attachment, depression, and euthanasia. Anthrozoös, 30(1), 135–148.
- Testoni, I., Sansonetto, G., Ronconi, L., Rodelli, M., Baracco, G., & Grassi, L. (2018). Meaning of life, representation of death, and her association with psychological distress. Palliative & Supportive Care, 16(5), 511–519.
- Testoni, I., Palazzo, L., Ronconi, L., Rossi, G., Ferizoviku, J., & Morales, J. R. P. (2021). The experience of children with a parent suffering from Amyotrophic Lateral Sclerosis during the COVID-19 pandemic. Scientific Reports, 11(1), 16046.
- Testoni, I., Biancalani, G., Ronconi, L., Pedrini, A., Romanelli, S., & Melendugno, A. (2023). Ambiguous loss and disenfranchised grief in formal caregivers of people with dementia: Effectiveness of a training intervention with psychodrama. The Arts in Psychotherapy, 85, 102037.
