= IUBMB Life =

- Discipline: Biochemistry and Molecular Biology
- Language: English
- Edited by: Angelo Azzi and William J. Whelan

Publication details
- Former name(s): Biochemistry and Molecular Biology International
- History: 1999
- Publisher: John Wiley & Sons (United States)
- Frequency: Monthly
- Open access: After 1 year
- Impact factor: 4.709 (2021)

Standard abbreviations
- ISO 4: IUBMB Life

Indexing
- CODEN: IULIF8
- ISSN: 1521-6543 (print); 1521-6551 (web)

Links
- Journal homepage; Online access

IUBMB Life is a peer-reviewed scientific journal of developmental biology that was established in 1999. It is one of four official journals of the IUBMB. The journal is published monthly by John Wiley & Sons.

According to the Journal Citation Reports, the journal has a 2020 impact factor of 3.885, ranking it 147th out of 297 journals in the category "Biochemistry and Molecular Biology" and 121st out of 195 journals in the category "Cell Biology".

== Aims and Scope ==
IUBMB Life is the flagship journal of the International Union of Biochemistry and Molecular Biology and is devoted to the rapid publication of the most novel and significant original research articles, reviews, and hypotheses in the broadly defined fields of biochemistry, molecular biology, cell biology, and molecular medicine. The journal publishes interdisciplinary, basic to translational research and covers all fields in the life science at every level of organization:

Research communications are original research articles that present new findings of unusually high importance, which provide major new functional insights in biology. Critical Reviews are short, concise, and sharply focused reviews of current hot topics in the biological sciences. Critical Reviews and Hypotheses Papers make new specialized areas highly accessible to all scientists and develop novel insights and approaches for future research. Articles that integrate several biological disciplines, or successfully relate basic biology to human pathology or medicine, are especially encouraged.
