= PHLPP =

Class of enzymes

PH domain and leucine-rich repeat protein phosphatase

Identifiers
- Symbol: PHLPP
- Alt. symbols: PHLPP1, PLEKHE1
- NCBI gene: 23239
- HGNC: 20610
- OMIM: 609396
- RefSeq: XM_166290
- UniProt: O60346

Other data
- EC number: 3.1.3.16
- Locus: Chr. 18 q21.32
Search for
- Structures: Swiss-model
- Domains: InterPro

PH domain and leucine rich repeat protein phosphatase-like

Identifiers
- Symbol: PHLPPL
- Alt. symbols: PHLPP2
- NCBI gene: 23035
- HGNC: 29149
- OMIM: 611066
- RefSeq: NM_015020
- UniProt: Q6ZVD8

Other data
- EC number: 3.1.3.16
- Locus: Chr. 16 q22.2
Search for
- Structures: Swiss-model
- Domains: InterPro

The PHLPP isoforms (PH domain and Leucine rich repeat Protein Phosphatases) are a pair of protein phosphatases, PHLPP1 and PHLPP2, that are important regulators of Akt serine-threonine kinases (Akt1, Akt2, Akt3) and conventional/novel protein kinase C (PKC) isoforms. PHLPP may act as a tumor suppressor in several types of cancer due to its ability to block growth factor-induced signaling in cancer cells.

PHLPP dephosphorylates Ser-473 (the hydrophobic motif) in Akt, thus partially inactivating the kinase.

In addition, PHLPP dephosphorylates conventional and novel members of the protein kinase C family at their hydrophobic motifs, corresponding to Ser-660 in PKCβII.

== Domain structure ==
PHLPP is a member of the PPM family of phosphatases, which requires magnesium or manganese for their activity and are insensitive to most common phosphatase inhibitors, including [okadaic acid]. PHLPP1 and PHLPP2 have a similar domain structure, which includes a putative Ras association domain, a pleckstrin homology domain, a series of leucine-rich repeats, a PP2C phosphatase domain, and a C-terminal PDZ ligand. PHLPP1 has two splice variants, PHLPP1α and PHLPP1β, of which PHLPP1β is larger by approximately 1.5 kilobase pairs. PHLPP1α, which was the first PHLPP isoform to be characterized, lacks the N-terminal portion of the protein, including the Ras association domain. PHLPP's domain structure influences its ability to dephosphorylate its substrates. A PHLPP construct lacking the PH domain is unable to decrease PKC phosphorylation, while PHLPP lacking the PDZ ligand is unable to decrease Akt phosphorylation.

== Dephosphorylation of Akt ==
The phosphatases in the PHLPP family, PHLPP1 and PHLPP2 have been shown to directly dephosphorylate, and therefore inactivate, distinct Akt isoforms, at one of the two critical phosphorylation sites required for activation: Serine473. PHLPP2 dephosphorylates AKT1 and AKT3, whereas PHLPP1 is specific for AKT2 and AKT3. Lack of PHLPP appears to have effects on growth factor-induced Akt phosphorylation. When both PHLPP1 and PHLPP2 are knocked down using siRNA and cells are stimulated using epidermal growth factor, peak Akt phosphorylation at both Serine473 and Threonine308 (the other site required for full Akt activation) is increased dramatically.

=== The Akt family of kinases ===
In humans, there are three genes in the Akt family: AKT1, AKT2, and AKT3. These enzymes are members of the serine/threonine-specific protein kinase family (EC 2.7.11.1).

Akt1 is involved in cellular survival pathways and inhibition of apoptotic processes. Akt1 is also able to induce protein synthesis pathways, and is therefore a key signaling protein in the cellular pathways that lead to skeletal muscle hypertrophy, and general tissue growth. Since it can block apoptosis, and thereby promote cell survival, Akt1 has been implicated as a major factor in many types of cancer. Akt (now also called Akt1) was originally identified as the oncogene in the transforming retrovirus, AKT8.

Akt2 is important in the insulin signaling pathway. It is required to induce glucose transport.

These separate roles for Akt1 and Akt2 were demonstrated by studying mice in which either the Akt1 or the Akt2 gene was deleted, or "knocked out". In a mouse that is null for Akt1 but normal for Akt2, glucose homeostasis is unperturbed, but the animals are smaller, consistent with a role for Akt1 in growth. In contrast, mice that do not have Akt2 but have normal Akt1 have mild growth deficiency and display a diabetic phenotype (insulin resistance), again consistent with the idea that Akt2 is more specific for the insulin receptor signaling pathway.

The role of Akt3 is less clear, though it appears to be expressed predominantly in brain. It has been reported that mice lacking Akt3 have small brains.

=== Phosphorylation of Akt by PDK1 and PDK2 ===
Once correctly positioned in the membrane via binding of PIP3, Akt can then be phosphorylated by its activating kinases, phosphoinositide-dependent kinase 1 (PDK1) and PDK2. Serine473, the hydrophobic motif, is phosphorylated in an mTORC2-dependent manner, leading some investigators to hypothesize that mTORC2 is the long-sought PDK2 molecule. Threonine308, the activation loop, is phosphorylated by PDK1, allowing full Akt activation. Activated Akt can then go on to activate or deactivate its myriad substrates via its kinase activity. The PHLPPs therefore antagonize PDK1 and PDK2, since they dephosphorylate the site that PDK2 phosphorylates.

== Dephosphorylation of protein kinase C ==
PHLPP1 and 2 also dephosphorylate the hydrophobic motifs of two classes of the protein kinase C (PKC) family: the conventional PKCs and the novel PKCs. (The third class of PKCs, known as the atypicals, have a phospho-mimetic at the hydrophobic motif, rendering them insensitive to PHLPP.)

The PKC family of kinases consists of 10 isoforms, whose sensitivity to various second messengers is dictated by their domain structure. The conventional PKCs can be activated by calcium and diacylglycerol, two important mediators of G protein-coupled receptor signaling. The novel PKCs are activated by diacylglycerol but not calcium, while the atypical PKCs are activated by neither.

The PKC family, like Akt, plays roles in cell survival and motility. Most PKC isoforms are anti-apoptotic, although PKCδ (a novel PKC isoform) is pro-apoptotic in some systems.

Although PKC possesses the same phosphorylation sites as Akt, its regulation is quite different. PKC is constitutively phosphorylated, and its acute activity is regulated by binding of the enzyme to membranes. Dephosphorylation of PKC at the hydrophobic motif by PHLPP allows PKC to be dephosphorylated at two other sites (the activation loop and the turn motif). This in turn renders PKC sensitive to degradation. Thus, prolonged increases in PHLPP expression or activity inhibit PKC phosphorylation and stability, decreasing the total levels of PKC over time.

== Role in cancer ==
Investigators have hypothesized that the PHLPP isoforms may play roles in cancer, for several reasons. First, the genetic loci coding for PHLPP1 and 2 are commonly lost in cancer. The region including PHLPP1, 18q21.33, commonly undergoes loss of heterozygosity (LOH) in colon cancers, while 16q22.3, which includes the PHLPP2 gene, undergoes LOH in breast and ovarian cancers, Wilms tumors, prostate cancer and hepatocellular carcinoma. Second, experimental overexpression of PHLPP in cancer cell lines tends to decrease apoptosis and increase proliferation, and stable colon and glioblastoma cell lines overexpressing PHLPP1 show decreased tumor formation in xenograft models. Recent studies have also shown that Bcr-Abl, the fusion protein responsible for chronic myelogenous leukemia (CML), downregulates PHLPP1 and PHLPP2 levels, and that decreasing PHLPP levels interferes with the efficacy of Bcr-Abl inhibitors, including Gleevec, in CML cell lines.

Finally, both Akt and PKC are known to be tumor promoters, suggesting that their negative regulator PHLPP may act as a tumor suppressor.
