= Biotechnology and Applied Biochemistry =

- Discipline: Biotechnology, biochemistry
- Language: English

Publication details
- Former name(s): Journal of Applied Biochemistry
- History: 1979–present
- Publisher: Wiley-Blackwell on behalf of the International Union of Biochemistry and Molecular Biology
- Frequency: Bimonthly
- Open access: Hybrid
- Impact factor: 2.431 (2020)

Standard abbreviations
- ISO 4: Biotechnol. Appl. Biochem.

Indexing
- CODEN: BABIEC
- ISSN: 0885-4513 (print); 1470-8744 (web)
- LCCN: 87640639
- OCLC no.: 12644720
- Journal of Applied Biochemistry
- ISSN: 0161-7354

Links
- Journal homepage; Online access; Online archive

Biotechnology and Applied Biochemistry is a bimonthly peer-reviewed scientific journal covering biotechnology applied to medicine, veterinary medicine, and diagnostics. Topics covered include the expression, extraction, purification, formulation, stability, and characterization of both natural and recombinant biological molecules. It is published by Wiley-Blackwell on behalf of the International Union of Biochemistry and Molecular Biology. The editors-in-chief are Gianfranco Gilardi (University of Torino) and Jian-Jiang Zhong (Shanghai Jiao Tong University).

== History ==
The journal was established in 1979 under the title Journal of Applied Biochemistry by Academic Press, obtaining its present title in 1986.

Former editors-in-chief include Peter Campbell (University College London; before 1996), Roger Lundblad (formerly of Baxter Biotech, Duarte, California; 1996–2002), and Parviz A. Shamlou (Eli Lilly; 2003–2012).

== Abstracting and indexing ==
The journal is abstracted and indexed by:

- Biochemistry & Biophysics Citation Index
- Biological Abstracts
- BIOSIS Previews
- Biotechnology Citation Index
- CABI databases
- Chemical Abstracts Service
- Compendex
- Current Contents/Agriculture, Biology & Environmental Sciences
- Current Contents/Life Sciences
- EBSCO databases
- Elsevier Biobase
- Embase
- Index medicus/MEDLINE/PubMed
- Inspec
- ProQuest databases
- Science Citation Index
- Scopus

According to the Journal Citation Reports, the journal has a 2019 impact factor of 1.638.
