= Marianne Grunberg-Manago =

French biochemist (1921–2013)

- Марианна Грюнберг
- Born: 6 January 1921; Petrograd, Russia
- Died: 3 January 2013 (aged 91); Paris, France
- Education: University of Paris
- Scientific career
- Fields: Biochemistry
- Workplaces: Institut de biologie physico-chimique

Marianne Vladimirovna Grunberg Manago (6 January 1921 – 3 January 2013) was a Russian-born French biochemist. Her work helped make possible key discoveries about the nature of the genetic code. Grunberg-Manago was the first woman to lead the International Union of Biochemistry and the 400-year-old French Academy of Sciences. She was the first woman to head the Société Française de Biochimie et Biologie Moléculaire, the organisation behind the Marianne Grunberg-Manago medal.

In early 2026 she was confirmed to be one of the 72 women to have their names added to those of the men already engraved on the Eiffel Tower.

== Early life and education ==
Marianne Grunberg was born in Petrograd, Russia (now St. Petersburg), on 6 January 1921 to Catherine (née Riasanoff) and Wladimir Grunberg, an agent for artists. From her mother's side, she was descended from the Swiss educator Johann Heinrich Pestalozzi and the Russian historian Vasily Tatishchev. When she was nine months old, her parents emigrated from Russia, first to Germany and then to France to avoid the aftermath of the Russian Revolution. She lived in Nice from the age of 12 and when she was 17, she passed the baccalauréat.

After first obtaining a qualification in comparative literature (1940), she embarked on scientific studies. She graduated at the University of Paris in 1943 and in 1947 went on to defend her doctorate thesis.

== Career ==
Following her doctorate, she undertook research in the marine biology laboratory in Roscoff in Brittany. She then moved to the United States with her husband, artist Armand Manago Guerin V.

There she first worked at Irwin Gunsalus' laboratory at the University of Illinois and then in 1954 at Severo Ochoa's moledcular biology laboratory ar the New York University School of Medicine. While there, in 1955 she discovered the first nucleic-acid-synthesizing enzyme, polynucleotide phosphorylase. Initially, everyone thought the new enzyme was an RNA polymerase used by E. coli cells to make long chains of RNA from separate nucleotides.

Although the new enzyme could link a few nucleotides together, the reaction was highly reversible and it later became clear that the enzyme polynucleotide phosphorylase usually catalyzes the breakdown of RNA, not its synthesis. The enzyme was extraordinarily useful and important. Almost immediately, Marshall Nirenberg and J. Heinrich Matthaei put it to use to form the first three-nucleotide RNA codons, which coded for the amino acid phenylalanine. This first step in cracking the genetic code entirely depended on the availability of Grunberg-Manago’s enzyme. Severo Ochoa and Arthur Kornberg won the 1959 Nobel Prize in Physiology or Medicine "for the synthesis of the nucleic acids RNA and DNA".

Grunberg-Munago returned to France in 1956 to work at the Institut de biologie physico-chimique.

She was elected a Foreign Honorary Member of the American Academy of Arts and Sciences in 1978, a Foreign Associate Member of the National Academy of Sciences in 1982, and an International member of the American Philosophical Society in 1992.

Grunberg-Manago was the first woman president of the International Union of Biochemistry (1985–1988), and she was also the first woman to preside over the French Academy of Sciences (1995–1996). She was the first woman to lead the Société Française de Biochimie et Biologie Moléculaire in 1975.

Late in her career, Grunberg-Manago was named emeritus director of research at CNRS, France's National Center for Scientific Research.

== Personal life ==
Marianne Grunberg married the Primitive artist Armand Munago in 1947 and added his surname to her own. The couple had two children.

Grunberg-Manago died in January 2013, three days before her 92nd birthday. She was buried with her husband and parents in the Sainte-Geneviève-des-Bois Russian Cemetery near Paris.

== Awards and honours ==
The Société Française de Biochimie et Biologie Moléculaire is the leading French organisation for Biochemistry. It was founded in 1914 and it announced that it was to give an annual award of 3,000 Euros. The winner would receive a medal and it would be called the Marianne Grunberg-Manago Award. It was open to any woman who had been a member of the society for three years.

Grunberg-Manago received many awards and distinctions, including:

- Member of the EMBO (1964)
- Charles-Léopold-Mayer Prize from the French Academy of Sciences (1966)
- Foreign member of the American Society of Biological Chemists (1972)
- Member of the Federation of American Societies for Experimental Biology
- Member of the French Society for biochemistry and molecular biology
- Foreign member of the Franklin Society (1995)
- Member of the Spanish Society for molecular biology
- Member of the Greek Society for molecular biology
- Member of the Executive Board of the ICSU
- Foreign member of the New York Academy of Sciences (1977)
- Foreign member of the American Academy of Arts and Sciences (1978)
- Foreign member of the National Academy of Sciences in the United States (1982)
- Honorary foreign member of the USSR Academy of Sciences (1988)
- Member of Academia Europaea (1988)
- Honorary foreign member of the Russian Academy of sciences (1991)
- Foreign member of the Ukrainian Academy of Sciences (1991)
- Grand Officer of the National Order of the Legion of Honor (2008)

In 2026, Grunberg-Manago was announced as one of 72 historical women in STEM whose names have been proposed to be added to the 72 men already celebrated on the Eiffel Tower. The plan was conceived by a student and tour guide named Bernard Rigaud and it was taken up by Sorbonne University's President Nathalie Drach-Temam. and it was announced by the Mayor of Paris, Anne Hidalgo following the recommendations of a committee led by Isabelle Vauglin of Femmes et Sciences and Jean-François Martins, representing the operating company which runs the Eiffel Tower.
