= Molecular Aspects of Medicine =

- Discipline: Molecular medicine
- Language: English
- Edited by: George A. Calin

Publication details
- Publisher: Elsevier
- Frequency: Bimonthly
- Impact factor: 13.7 (2025)

Standard abbreviations
- ISO 4: Mol. Asp. Med.

Indexing
- ISSN: 0098-2997

Links
- Journal homepage; Online access

Molecular Aspects of Medicine is a bimonthly peer-reviewed medical journal covering molecular medicine. It is published by Elsevier and affiliated with the International Union of Biochemistry and Molecular Biology.

== Abstracting and indexing ==
The journal is abstracted and indexed in:

- BIOSIS Previews
- Elsevier Biobase
- Chemical Abstracts
- Embase
- MEDLINE
- Science Citation Index Expanded
- Scopus

== Article categories ==
The journal publishes only invited review articles in Thematic Issues.
