= Phosphotyrosine-binding domain =

Protein domain

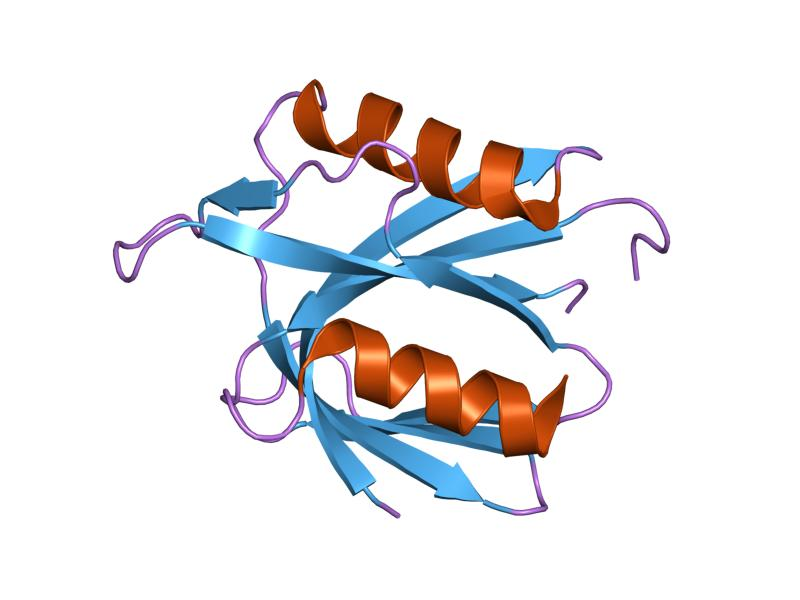
- Structure of the PTB domain of tensin1.

Identifiers
- Symbol: PTB
- Pfam: PF08416
- InterPro: IPR013625
- CDD: cd00934
Available protein structures:
- PDB: 1wvhA:1607-1738 IPR013625 PF08416 (ECOD; PDBsum)
- AlphaFold: IPR013625; PF08416

PTB domain (IRS-1 type)
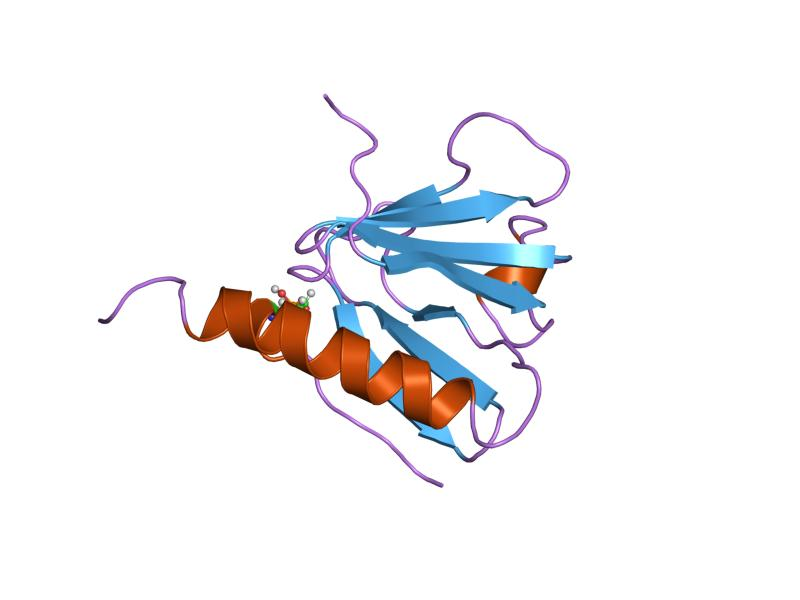
- irs-1 ptb domain complexed with a il-4 receptor phosphopeptide, nmr, minimized average structure

Identifiers
- Symbol: IRS
- Pfam: PF02174
- InterPro: IPR002404
- SMART: PTBI
- SCOP2: 1cli / SCOPe / SUPFAM
- CDD: cd01204
Available protein structures:
- PDB: IPR002404 PF02174 (ECOD; PDBsum)
- AlphaFold: IPR002404; PF02174

In molecular biology, phosphotyrosine-binding domains are protein domains which bind to phosphotyrosine.

The phosphotyrosine-binding domain (PTB, also phosphotyrosine-interaction or PI domain) in the protein tensin tends to be found at the C-terminus. Tensin is a multi-domain protein that binds to actin filaments and functions as a focal-adhesion molecule (focal adhesions are regions of plasma membrane through which cells attach to the extracellular matrix). Human tensin has actin-binding sites, an SH2 (Pfam PF00017) domain and a region similar to the tumour suppressor PTEN. The PTB domain interacts with the cytoplasmic tails of beta integrin by binding to an NPXY motif.

The phosphotyrosine-binding domain of insulin receptor substrate-1 is not related to the phosphotyrosine-binding domain of tensin. Insulin receptor substrate-1 proteins contain both a pleckstrin homology domain and a phosphotyrosine binding (PTB) domain. The PTB domains facilitate interaction with the activated tyrosine-phosphorylated insulin receptor. The PTB domain is situated towards the N terminus. Two arginines in this domain are responsible for hydrogen bonding phosphotyrosine residues on an Ac-LYASSNPApY-NH_{2} peptide in the juxtamembrane region of the insulin receptor. Further interactions via "bridged" water molecules are coordinated by residues an Asn and a Ser residue. The PTB domain has a compact, 7-stranded beta-sandwich structure, capped by a C-terminal helix. The substrate peptide fits into an L-shaped surface cleft formed from the C-terminal helix and strands 5 and 6.

== Human proteins containing these domains ==
APBA1; APBA2; APBA3; APPL1; EPS8; EPS8L1; EPS8L2; EPS8L3; TENC1; TNS; TNS1; TNS3; TNS4; DOK1; DOK2; DOK3; DOK4; DOK5; DOK6; DOK7; FRS2; FRS3; IRS1; IRS2; IRS4; NOS1AP; TLN1; TLN2

== See also ==
- SH2 domains also bind phosphorylated tyrosines
