= SCRN3 =

Protein-coding gene in the species Homo sapiens

Identifiers
- Aliases: SCRN3, SES3, secernin 3
- External IDs: OMIM: 614967; MGI: 1921866; GeneCards: SCRN3

Gene location (Human)
Chr.	Chromosome 2 (human)
Band	2q31.1	Start	174,395,730 bp
Band	2q31.1	End	174,429,575 bp

Gene location (Mouse)
Chr.	Chromosome 2 (mouse)
Band	2|2 C3	Start	73,142,945 bp
Band	2|2 C3	End	73,168,162 bp
RNA expression pattern
Bgee	Human / Mouse (ortholog); Top expressed in: ganglionic eminence; C1 segment; ventricular zone; islet of Langerhans; prefrontal cortex; muscle of thigh; Achilles tendon; gonad; jejunal mucosa; rectum / Top expressed in: facial motor nucleus; triceps brachii muscle; quadriceps femoris muscle; intercostal muscle; knee joint; gastrocnemius muscle; temporal muscle; muscle of thigh; vastus lateralis muscle; sternocleidomastoid muscle; More reference expression data
BioGPS	n/a
Orthologs
Databases	NCBI: entry; OMA: entry
Species	Human	Mouse
Entrez	79634	74616
Ensembl	ENSG00000144306	ENSMUSG00000008226
UniProt	Q0VDG4; Q0VDG5	Q3TMH2
RefSeq (mRNA)	NM_001193528; NM_024583	NM_029022; NM_001355711
RefSeq (protein)	NP_001180457; NP_078859; NP_078859.2	NP_083298; NP_001342640
Location (UCSC)	Chr 2: 174.4 – 174.43 Mb	Chr 2: 73.14 – 73.17 Mb
PubMed search
- Wikidata
View/Edit Human	View/Edit Mouse

Secernin-3 (SCRN3) is a protein that is encoded by the human SCRN3 gene. SCRN3 belongs to the peptidase C69 family and the secernin subfamily. As a part of this family, the protein is predicted to enable cysteine-type exopeptidase activity and dipeptidase activity, as well as be involved in proteolysis. It is ubiquitously expressed in the brain, thyroid, and 25 other tissues. Additionally, SCRN3 is conserved in a variety of species, including mammals, birds, fish, amphibians, and invertebrates. SCRN3 is predicted to be an integral component of the cytoplasm.

== Gene ==
SCRN3 is also commonly known as FLJ23142 and SES3.

=== Locus ===
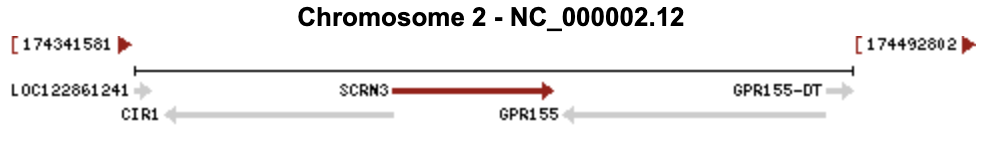
Human SCRN3 Genetic Locus, found using NCBI Gene

Homo sapiens secernin-3 (SCRN3) is a protein-coding gene. It can be found on chromosome 2, with its specific location being 2q31.1, on the '+' strand. The gene is 33,846 base pairs long and contains 8 exons.

== Transcript ==
The most common transcript of the SCRN3 protein-coding gene is transcript variant 1, which is 3052 base pairs long. SCRN3 is expressed at a high level, 2.4 times the average gene in this release.

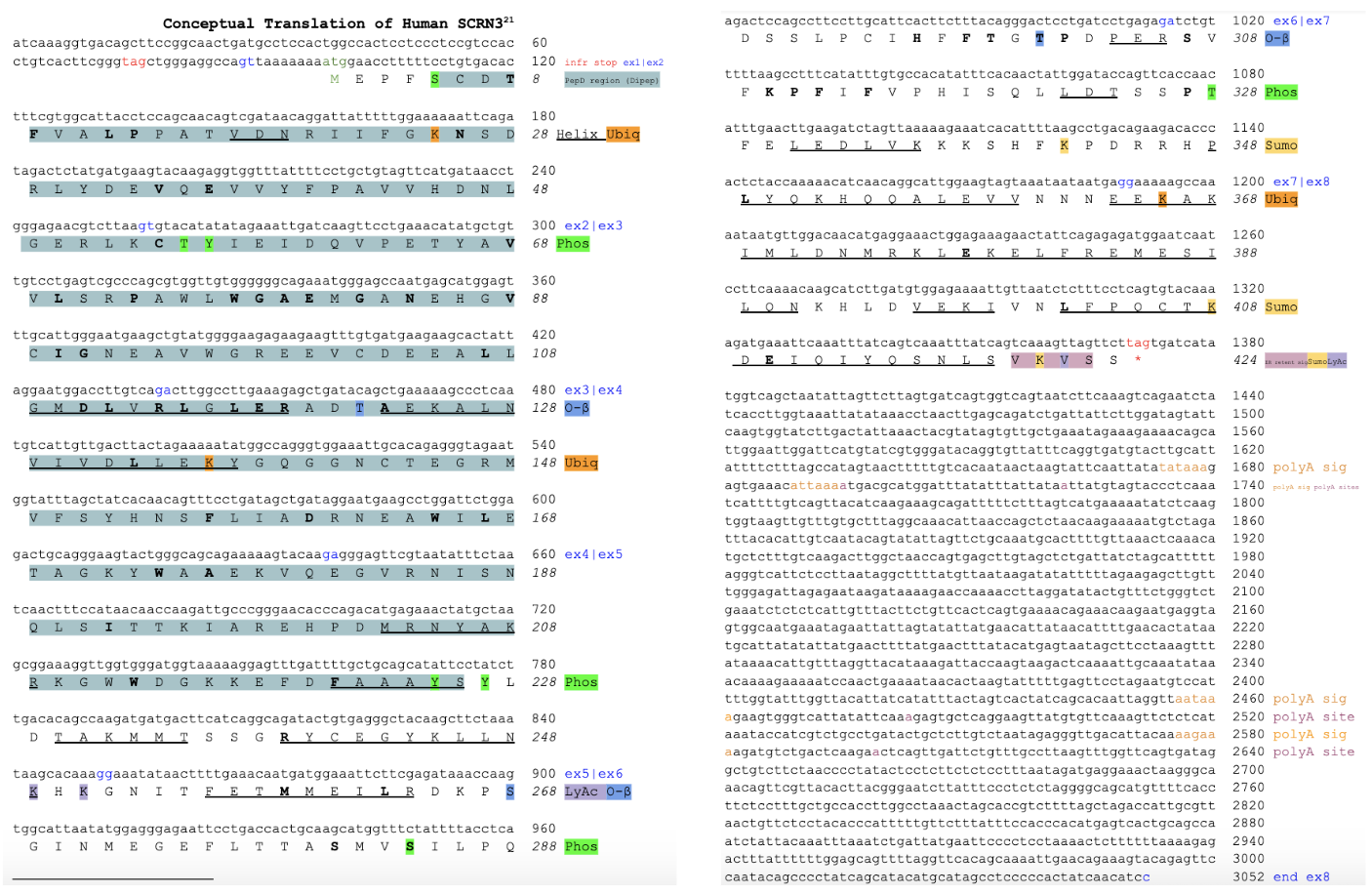
Human SCRN3 Annotated Conceptual Translation. Translated NM_024583.5 mRNA sequence using Six-Frame Translation tool at Bioline.

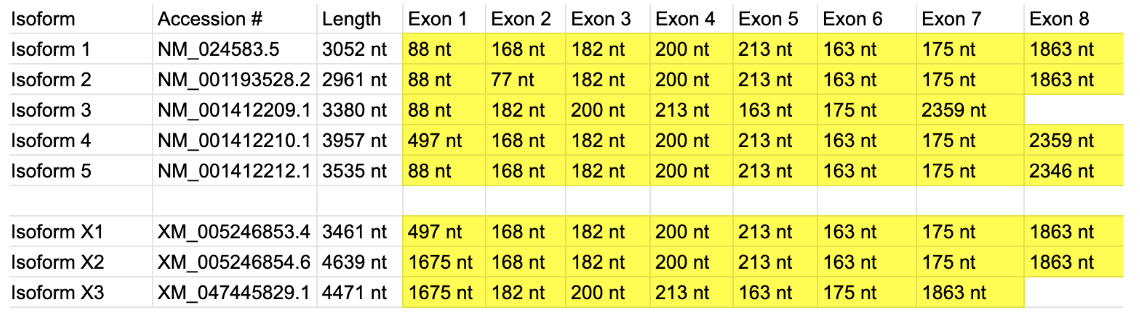
Table of Human SCRN3 mRNA isoforms. Sequences and annotations found using isoforms listed in NCBI Gene.^{1} Isoform name, accession number, and length of isoform transcript are listed on the left in units of nucleotides. Length of each exon is highlighted in yellow for each isoform variant. For Isoforms X1-X3, the BLAT Search Genome from UCSC was utilized in order to determine the locations of the exons within the sequence, in addition to NCBI Gene.

Human SCRN3 has 8 different isoforms.

=== Expression ===
The mRNA of SCRN3 was found to be moderate in humans. SCRN3 is expressed in most major tissues. The mRNA is expressed at slightly elevated levels in the brain, thyroid, heart, and prostate relative to other tissues, though the underlying trend was relatively consistent ubiquitous expression among various tissues.

In an analysis of SCRN3 in situ hybridization of both mouse brain and embryo, no specific areas of strong expression were located, instead showing a moderate expression throughout, confirming that SCRN3 likely has ubiquitous expression within most tissues. Immunohistochemistry data also indicated that human SCRN3 has low tissue, single cell, immune cell, and brain region specificity, once again adding to the evidence of ubiquitous expression.

== Protein ==
Transcript variant 1 of the SCRN3 gene encodes the most common protein isoform, secernin-3 isoform 1, which is 424 amino acids long. The molecular weight of the unmodified SCRN3 protein is approximately 48.413 kDa and the theoretical isoelectric point (pI) of SCRN3 is 5.38. The theoretical isoelectric point, coupled with a predominance of acidic amino acids in the protein's composition, suggest that SCRN3 is a relatively acidic protein.

Additionally, the relative protein abundance of SCRN3 in humans was found to be moderately high compared to other human proteins, at 6.13 ppm.

=== Domains ===
SCRN3 has a single notable domain, identified as the Peptidase_C69 Domain, or PepD domain for short. This domain spans from amino acid position 5 to 226 of the protein. The sequences found within this domain are characteristic of the Peptidase C69 family, and more specifically the Secernin subfamily, known to be mainly dipeptidases. Within this family, comparative sequence and structural analysis revealed a cysteine as the catalytic nucleophile, a feature that can be found on Secernin-3.

=== Structure ===
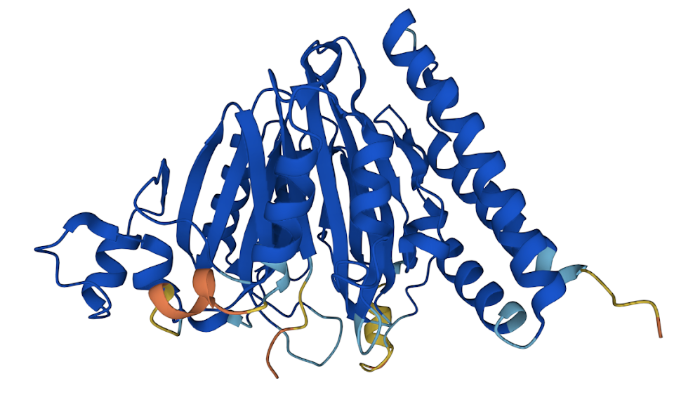
Alphafold predicted tertiary structure for human SCRN3 protein

Within the predicted tertiary structure of SCRN3, the most highly conserved amino acids were found predominantly within the internal portion of the protein. This suggests that the most conserved amino acids, being on the inside, are important to providing the structure of the protein, as well as providing internal functionality.

=== Localization ===
Within the cell, SCRN3 is predicted to be primarily expressed in the cytoplasm. The cytoplasmic localization prediction was consistent among 5 additional orthologs (Mauremys reevesii, Gallus gallus, Microcaecilia unicolor, Danio rerio, & Anopheles gambiae), confirming the predicted cytoplasmic subcellular localization of human SCRN3.

=== Post-Translational Modifications ===
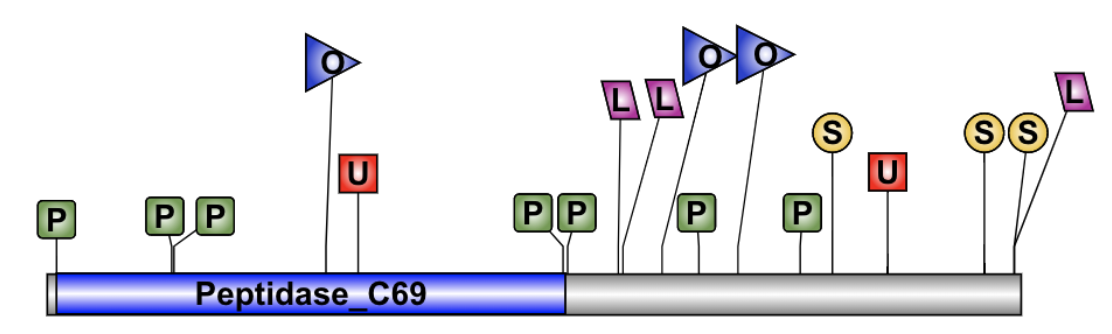
Human SCRN3 Predicted Protein Domain, Motif, and Post-Translational Modification diagram. P = Phosphorylation site, U = Ubiquitination site, S = Sumoylation site, L = Lysine-Acetylation site, O = O-beta-GlcNAc attachment site.

SCRN3 is subject to several predicted post-translational modifications, including phosphorylation, ubiquitylation, sumoylation, lysine acetylation, and O-beta-GlcNAc attachment sites, among others.

Additionally, Secernin-3 provided the first example of a predicted naturally occurring N-terminal glyoxylyl (Glox) electrophile through the use of reverse-polarity activity-based protein profiling (RP-ABPP). Using hydrazine probes, it was confirmed that the cysteine (Cys) residue was post-translationally converted to Glox. This identified an electrophilic n-terminal glyoxylyl group for the first time in secernin-3, though the functions of both the protein and Glox as a cofactor have not yet been experimentally validated.

== Homology/Evolution ==
=== Paralogs ===
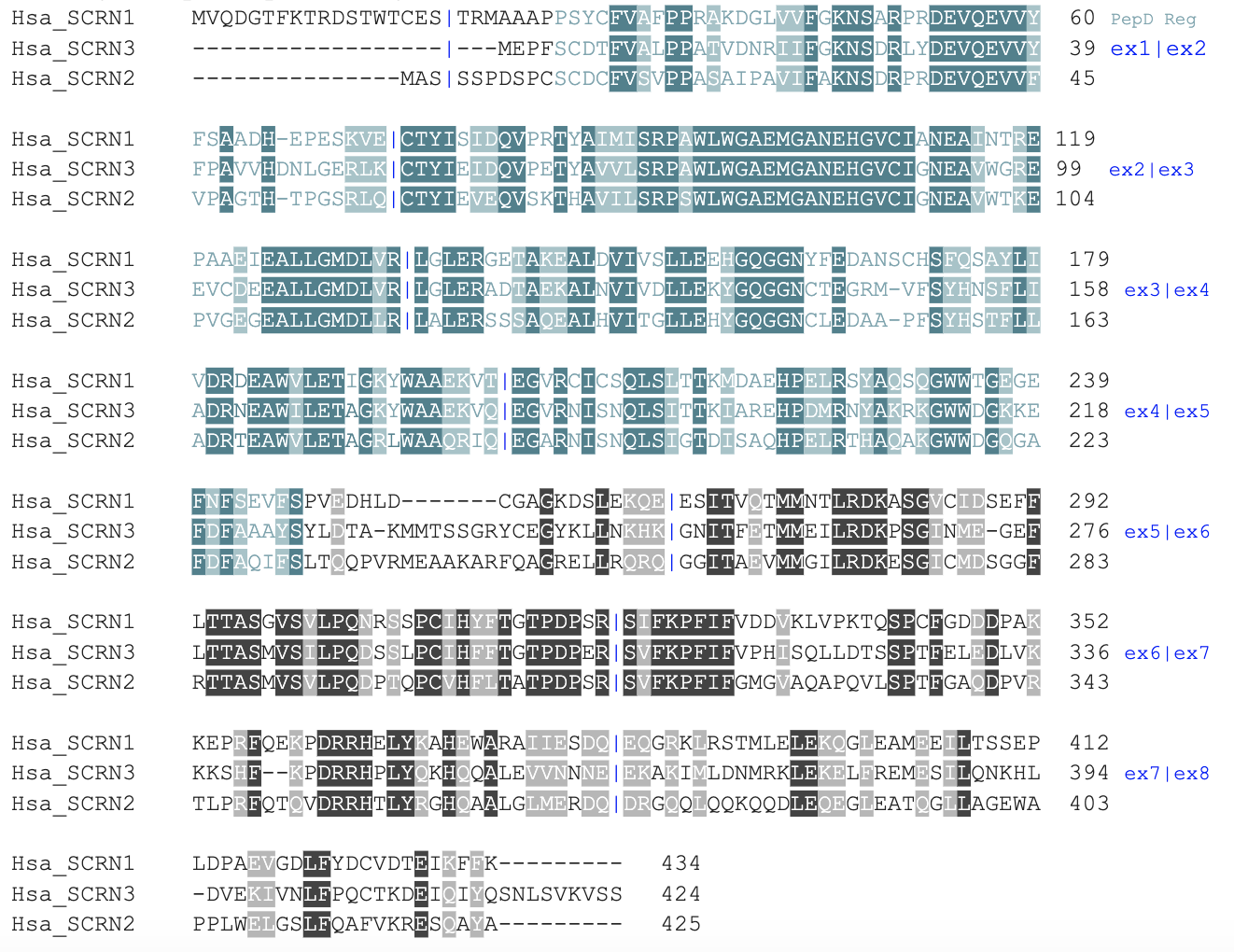
Multiple Sequence alignment of Human SCRN3 protein and its human paralogs, SCRN2 and SCRN1. Dark Shading indicates exact amino acid matches. Light shading indicates close matches. PepD region and exon boundaries determined from Homo sapiens SCRN3 sequence. Made using Clustal Omega

SCRN3 has two known paralogs, SCRN2 and SCRN1, which share a 67.4% and 63.8% similarity to the SCRN3 protein sequence, respectively. Both paralogs are moderately related to SCRN3. SCRN2 was found within the same species groups as SCRN3. SCRN1 was conserved in fewer species groups, including mammals, birds, reptiles, amphibians, and cartilaginous fish, but not in other fish or invertebrates.

=== Orthologs ===
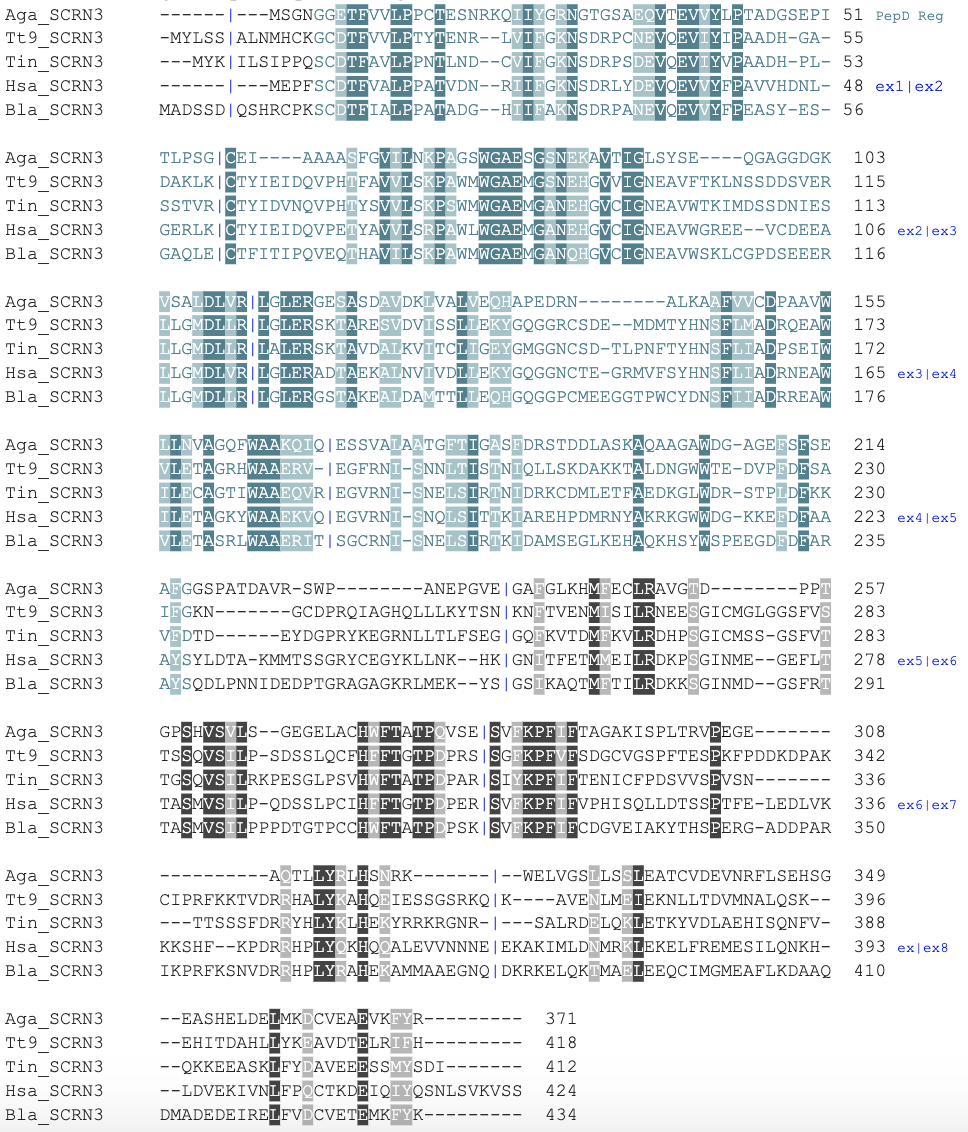
Multiple Sequence Alignment of Human SCRN3 protein with identified invertebrate orthologs. Dark Shading indicates exact amino acid matches. Light shading indicates close matches. PepD region and exon boundaries determined from Homo sapiens SCRN3 sequence. Created using Clustal Omega

Over 100 orthologs exist for the human gene SCRN3. The known orthologs were found to exist in vertebrates and invertebrates, but not in plants, bacteria, or fungi. The divergence date of 20 orthologs found were compared relative to Homo sapiens. Invertebrates are the most distantly related orthologs to human SCRN3, with the furthest median date of divergence from this set of orthologs being 694 million years ago.

SCRN3 Orthologs
	Genus and species	Common name	Taxonomic group	Median Date of Divergence (MYA)	Accession #	Sequence length (aa)	Sequence identity to human protein (%)	Sequence similarity to human protein (%)
Mammal	Homo sapiens	Human	Primates	0	NP_078859.2	424	100	100
	Mus musculus	House mouse	Rodentia	87	NP_083298.1	418	90.1	93.7
	Canis lupus familiaris	Dog	Carnivora	94	XP_038303032.1	422	80.9	89.9
	Gracilinanus agilis	Agile Gracile Opossum	Didelphimorphia	160	XP_044522430.1	421	74.2	84.5
	Tachyglossus aculeatus	Australian Echidna	Monotremata	180	XP_038607834.1	427	70.5	81.2
Reptilia	Mauremys reevesii	Reeves' Turtle	Testudines	319	XP_039351479.1	424	73.1	82.6
	Crocodylus porosus	Australian Saltwater Crocodile	Crocodylia	319	XP_019409221	423	72.5	82
	Varanus komodoensis	Komodo Dragon	Squamata	319	XP_044273731.1	421	70.3	81.9
Aves	Gallus gallus	Red Junglefowl (Chicken)	Galliformes	319	NP_001244270.2	420	70.7	79.5
	Anas platyrhynchos	Mallard	Anseriformes	319	XP_027317143.2	422	70.1	81
	Corvus hawaiiensis	Hawaiian Crow	Passeriformes	319	XP_048165925.1	420	70	80
Amphibian	Microcaecilia unicolor	N/A	Gymnophiona	353	XP_030064980.1	415	67.8	81.2
	Xenopus tropicalis	Tropical Clawed Frog	Anura	353	XP_002934649.3	410	63.4	74.4
Fish	Protopterus annectens	West African lungfish	Dipnoi	408	XP_043931491.1	420	63.3	75.5
	Latimeria chalumnae	Coelacanth	Coelacanthiformes	414	XP_006003581	431	63.5	75.7
	Danio rerio	Zebrafish	Actinopterygii	431	NP_956032.1	417	61.7	74.2
	Callorhinchus milii	Elephant Shark	Chondrichthyes	464	XP_007888203.1	426	63.2	77.5
Invertebrate	Branchiostoma lanceolatum	Common Lancelet	Cephalochordata	556	CAH1238234.1	434	48	64.4
	Trichinella sp. T9	Trichinella Roundworm	Nematoda	694	KRX60400.1	418	47.2	62
	Trichonephila inaurata madagascariensis	Red-Legged Golden Orb-Web Spider	Arthropoda	694	GFY76389.1	412	45.4	59.1
	Anopheles gambiae	African malaria mosquito	Arthropoda	694	XP_321103.4	371	29.1	44.1

=== Evolution ===
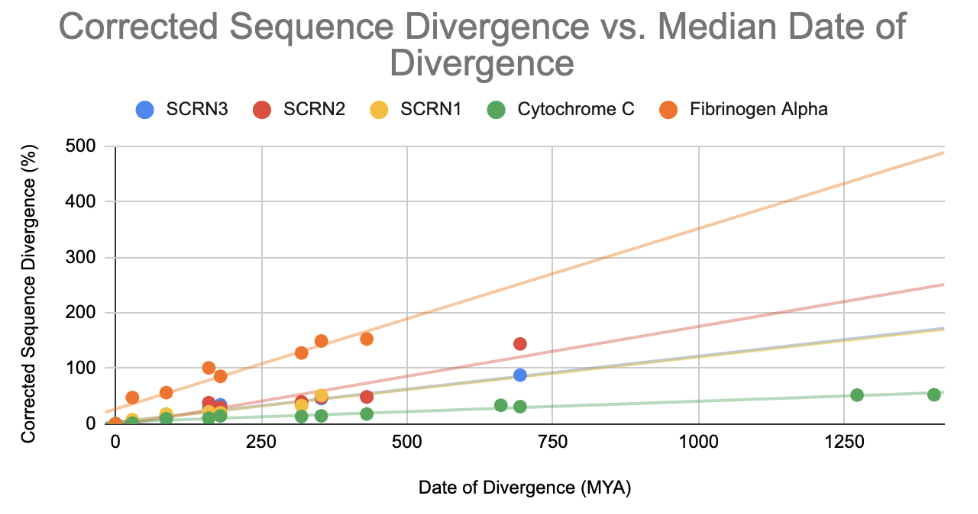
Graph of Corrected Sequence Divergence vs. Median Date of Divergence. Blue indicates SCRN3. Red indicates SCRN2. Yellow indicates SCRN1. Green indicates Cytochrome C. Orange indicates Fibrinogen Alpha.

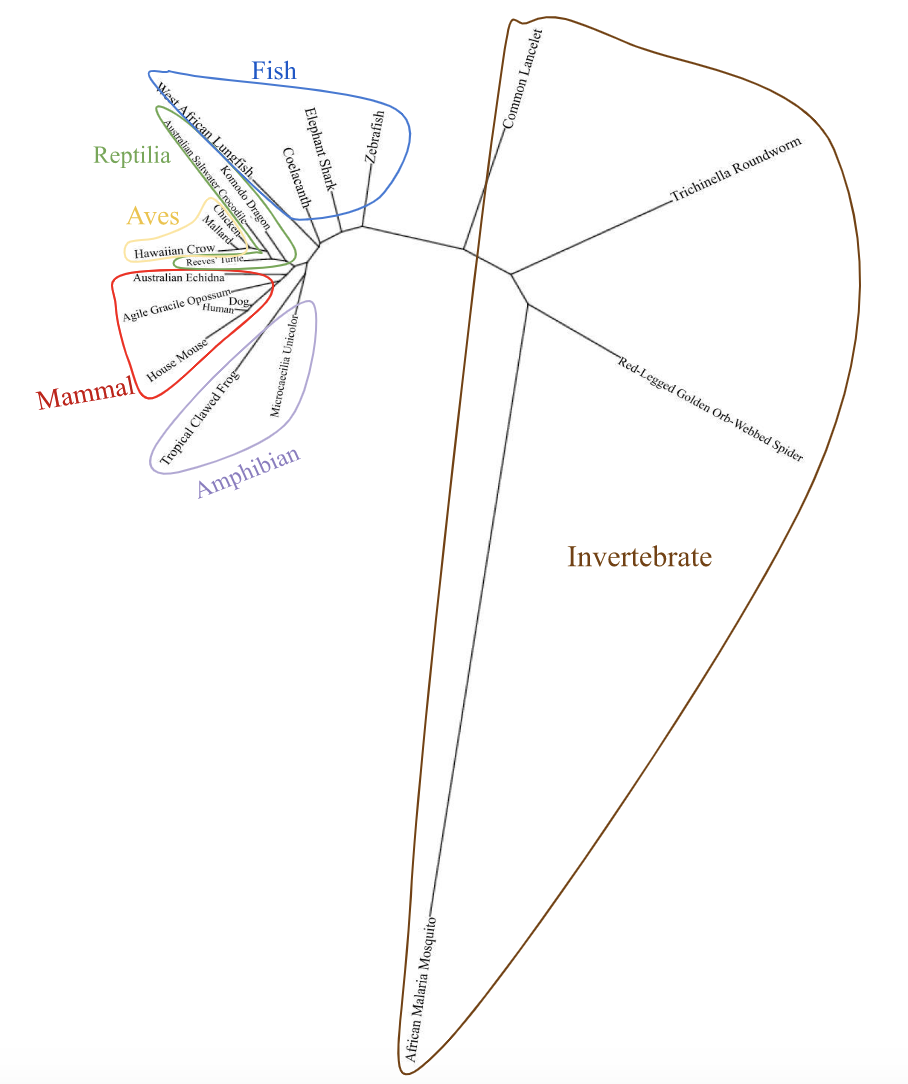
SCRN3 time-calibrated unrooted phylogenetic tree. Colored circles indicate taxonomic groupings. Created using Méthodes et Algorithmes pour la Bio-informatique LIRMM “One-Click” Phylogeny Tool

The relative rate of molecular evolution for SCRN3 was moderately high, being slightly lower than the evolution rate of Fibrinogen Alpha, and more rapid than the evolution rate of Cytochrome C. SCRN3 is estimated to have first appeared in invertebrates approximately 694 million years ago, evolving to eventually being found in humans.

== Interacting Proteins ==
A search of PSCQUIC identified 5 proteins that interact with human SCRN3 protein.

Interacting Protein	Protein Full Name	Interaction Type	Interaction Detection method	Experimental Role	Cellular Compartment	Function
RCVRN	Recoverin	association, physical association	anti tag coimmunoprecipitation, affinity chromatography technology	bait	cytosol, nucleus, mitochondrion, cytoskeleton, extracellular, plasma membrane	Encodes a member of the recoverin family of neuronal calcium sensors. May prolong the termination of the phototransduction cascade in the retina by blocking the phosphorylation of photo-activated rhodopsin.
EPS8	Epidermal Growth Factor Receptor Pathway Substrate 8	colocalization, physical association (x2)	confocal microscopy, two hybrid, affinity chromatography technology	neutral component, unspecified role	cytosol, extracellular, plasma membrane	It functions as part of the epidermal growth factor receptor (EGFR) pathway. Signaling adapter that controls various cellular protrusions by regulating actin cytoskeleton dynamics and architecture
MAGOH	Mago Homolog, Exon Junction Complex Subunit	association, physical association, direct interaction	anti tag coimmunoprecipitation, affinity chromatography technology, two hybrid	bait	nucleus, cytosol	Required for pre-mRNA splicing as component of the spliceosome. Core component of the exon junction complex (EJC). The EJC is a dynamic structure consisting of core proteins and several peripheral nuclear and cytoplasmic associated factors that join the complex only transiently either during EJC assembly or during subsequent mRNA metabolism. Expressed ubiquitously in adult tissues.
DAPK1	Death Associated Protein Kinase 1	direct interaction	protein array	prey	Cytoskeleton, plasma membrane, cytosol, nucleus	Positive mediator of gamma-interferon induced programmed cell death. Involved in multiple cellular signaling pathways that trigger cell survival, apoptosis, and autophagy
SMYD1	SET and MYND Domain Containing 1	association, physical association, direct interaction	anti tag coimmunoprecipitation, affinity chromatography technology	bait	cytoplasm, nucleus	Predicted to enable histone-lysine- N-methyltransferase activity. Involved in positive regulation of myoblast differentiation. Predicted to be located in cytoplasm. Acts as a transcriptional repressor.
