= ENAH =

ENAH may refer to:

- ENAH (gene), a gene [Enabled homolog (Drosophila)] located on chromosome 1 in humans
- Escuela Nacional de Antropología e Historia, the national educational institute for anthropological and historical studies in Mexico City, Mexico
