= Proline and serine-rich protein 2 =

Protein-coding gene in the species Homo sapiens

PROSER2

Identifiers
- Aliases: PROSER2, C10orf47, proline and serine rich 2
- External IDs: MGI: 2442238; HomoloGene: 51648; GeneCards: PROSER2; OMA:PROSER2 - orthologs

Gene location (Human)
Chr.	Chromosome 10 (human)
Band	10p14	Start	11,823,339 bp
Band	10p14	End	11,872,277 bp

Gene location (Mouse)
Chr.	Chromosome 2 (mouse)
Band	2|2 A1	Start	6,102,418 bp
Band	2|2 A1	End	6,135,022 bp
RNA expression pattern
Bgee	Human / Mouse (ortholog); Top expressed in: pancreatic ductal cell; amniotic fluid; right lobe of liver; secondary oocyte; cartilage tissue; gonad; endothelial cell; tibial nerve; gingival epithelium; tibia / Top expressed in: epithelium of lens; molar; lacrimal gland; lip; vestibular sensory epithelium; esophagus; conjunctival fornix; salivary gland; urinary bladder; parotid gland; More reference expression data
BioGPS	n/a
Orthologs
Species	Human	Mouse
Entrez	254427	227545
Ensembl	ENSG00000148426	ENSMUSG00000045319
UniProt	Q86WR7	Q8C5R2
RefSeq (mRNA)	NM_153256	NM_001159657; NM_144883
RefSeq (protein)	NP_694988	NP_001153129; NP_659132
Location (UCSC)	Chr 10: 11.82 – 11.87 Mb	Chr 2: 6.1 – 6.14 Mb
PubMed search
- Wikidata
View/Edit Human	View/Edit Mouse

Proline and serine-rich protein 2 (PROSER2) is a protein that in humans is encoded by the PROSER2 gene. PROSER2, or C10orf47 (Chromosome 10 open reading frame 47), is found in band 14 of the short arm of chromosome 10 (10p14) and contains a highly conserved SARG domain. It is a fast evolving gene with two paralogs, c1orf116 and specifically androgen-regulated gene protein isoform 1. The PROSER2 protein has a currently uncharacterized function however, in humans, it may play a role in cell cycle regulation, reproductive functioning, and is a potential biomarker of cancer.

== Gene ==
This gene is 48,880 bases in length and is 3,360 base pairs in length after transcription to mRNA. PROSER2 has 5 splice variants, 3 of which are alternatively spliced and 2 of which are unspliced forms. It contains an upstream in-frame stop codon and a 2,000 bp promoter.

=== Locus ===
PROSER2 is located on the tenth chromosome (10p14). It is oriented on the plus strand of DNA and has 5 exons.

=== Transcript ===
Splice Variant	Name	Sequence length (bp)	Protein Length (aa)	Mass (DA)	Type	Features
1 - Primary Transcript	PROSER2; c10orf47	3360	435	45,802	Protein coding (full length)	5 exons; 4 coding exons Predicted: 1 dimethylated arginine; 1 omega-N-methylarginine 37 Phosphorylation sites; 2 SUMO Interaction Motifs; 2 S-Palmitoylation sites; 2 GalNac O-glycosylation sites Isoelectric point: 6.81 Charge: 3.0
2		1646	341		Protein coding	5 exons; 4 coding exons
3	c10orf47 isoform CRA_b	1232	239	24,793	Protein coding	1 exon; 1 coding exon Isoelectric point: 12.21 Charge: 19.0
4		476	85	9,554	Protein coding	3 exons; 2 coding exons 3' truncated in transcript; 85th aa is non-terminal residue Isoelectric point: 4.25 Charge: -8.0
5		728	No protein		Processed transcript	4 exons; 0 coding exons

== Homology and evolution ==
The evolutionary history of PROSER2 versus Cytochrome C and Fibrinogen alpha subunit. Each data point on the graph represents a homolog of the human gene found in a different species that was found using a BLAST search. This search resulted in percent identities which are graphed against the estimated time of divergence from humans which was found using TimeTree.This graph demonstrates that PROSER2 is a fast-evolving gene, similar to the Fibrinogen alpha subunit.

=== Orthologous space ===
The orthologous space for PROSER2 is fairly large, as 143 organisms are reported to have orthologs with the human PROSER2. The most distant ortholog of the human PROSER2 is the elephant shark, Callorhinchus milii. The most distant relatives of humans with PROSER2 are fish and sharks (cartilaginous fishes). For this same reason, it can be inferred that PROSER2 originated in vertebrates.

=== Paralogous space ===
The human PROSER2 gene has two paralogs: c1orf116 and specifically androgen-regulated gene protein isoform 1.

=== Conserved regions ===
Multiple sequence alignments demonstrated that the 3’ end of the proline-serine rich 2 protein is highly conserved in both distant and close homologs. These widely conserved amino acids found in all primates, mammals, reptiles, birds, amphibians, fish, and sharks for which sequences are available include: R421, G406, V409, A424, L425, L428, G429, and L430. It can be noted that these highly conserved amino acids comprise much of the 3’ end of the specifically androgen-regulated gene protein (SARG) domain. The 5’ end of the proline-serine rich 2 protein is highly conserved in close relatives of humans including all primates, mammals, reptiles, and birds for which sequences are available. PROSER2 has an even balance of basic and acidic residues which are conserved throughout all homologs.

=== Evolutionary pattern ===
PROSER2 is a fast evolving gene, similar to Fibrinogen alpha subunit (FGA). It aligns almost perfectly with Fibrinogen’s evolutionary history and is much farther away from the evolutionary timeline of Cytochrome C (CYCS) which is evolving more slowly than PROSER2 or FGA. Gene duplication of PROSER2 occurred approximately in fish which diverged from humans 436.8 MYA.

== Protein ==
In Homo sapiens, PROSER2 encodes the proline and serine-rich protein 2 which is 435 amino acids in length and has a molecular weight of 45,802 Da. This protein has a fairly neutral basal isoelectric point of 6.81. The proline and serine rich 2 protein contains a conserved SARG (specifically androgen-regulated gene protein) domain that spans 388 amino acids within PROSER2. The SARG domain belongs to the pfam15385 family of genes. Its true function has yet to be elucidated, but it is a suspected androgen receptor because it is up-regulated in the presence of androgens, but not glucocorticoids. The SARG domain is highly expressed in the prostate where PROSER2 has also been reported.

Human PROSER2 protein internal structure and features.

=== Internal structure ===
Features	Location
Ser-rich Region	aa 8-43
Region of Low Complexity	aa 27-43
Region of Low Complexity	aa 87-105
Region of Low Complexity	aa 113-126
Region of Low Complexity	aa 143-171
Pro-rich Region	aa 147-254
Region of Low Complexity	aa 228-246
Region of Low Complexity	aa 291-310
SARG Domain (Specifically androgen-regulated gene protein)	aa 44-433

=== Post-translational modifications ===
PROSER2 contains 35 predicted Serine phosphorylation sites, as well as 2 predicted Threonine phosphorylation sites on conserved residues. It is also predicted to contain 2 SUMO Interaction Motifs, 2 S-Palmitoylation sites, as well as 2 GalNac O-glycosylation sites all located on or near highly conserved amino acids. These modifications may change the folding and function of the protein which is predicted to be localized to the nucleus.

=== Predicted secondary structure ===
PROSER2’s structure is currently uncharacterized. However, it is likely to contain 4 alpha helices and 5 domains of beta sheets which are conserved across all mammalian homologs. Based on its structural features and post-translational modifications, it is predicted to be a soluble protein secreted from the nucleus via a non-classical secretion pathway.

== Function ==
The function of proline and serine rich 2 protein is currently unknown. However, it is listed in several U.S. patents as a potential biomarker of cancer.

=== Interactions ===
Previous experimentation has found that PROSER2 interacts with several other proteins including: STK24, ESR2, POT1, ACTB, and EPS8. These interacting proteins are involved in control of apoptosis, reproductive cell differentiation, telomere maintenance, cell integrity, and cell cycle progression, respectively. These interactions identify PROSER2 as a gene heavily involved in the regulation of cell differentiation and apoptosis.

== Expression ==
PROSER2 is extremely tissue specific in its expression, which is often low. In humans, PROSER2 is most highly expressed in the bone marrow, fetal brain, fetal kidney, liver, fetal liver, lung, fetal lung, lymph node, prostate, stomach, thymus, and trachea (GEO Profile ID: 69555271). It has also been found to be highly expressed in the colon, testes, parotid gland, and uterus (GEO Profile ID: 10034772) . The high expression in the testicular and prostate tissue is as expected given the existence of the SARG domain in the gene and its association with androgens. PROSER2 is least expressed in the heart, spinal cord, and several areas of the adult brain (GEO Profile ID: 69555271). PROSER2 has higher expression in ETP-ALL (early T-cell precursor acute lymphoblastic leukemia) patients compared to controls (GEO Profile ID: 92018456) and is highly expressed in primary tumors of the prostate compared to benign and malignant samples (GEO Profile ID: 14264706). PROSER2 is underexpressed in males with AIS (Androgen Insensitivity Syndrome), which follows with the evidence previously described regarding the SARG domain. Treatment with dihydrotestosterone has been found to cause genital fibroblasts to increase expression of PROSER2, further supporting that it is an androgen-responsive gene (GEO Profile ID: 20808032).

=== Transcription factor interactions ===
PROSER2 interacts most strongly with the following transcription factors: Vertebrate TATA binding protein factor, ZF5 POZ domain zinc finger, CTCF and BORIS gene family transcriptional regulators, E2F-myc activator/cell cycle regulator, MYT1 C2HC zinc finger protein, SOX/SRY– sex/testis determining and related HMG box factors, CCAAT binding factors, HOX-PBX complexes, and C2HC zinc finger transcription factors 13. The SRY gene is the primary factor in determining testicular formation during development, so it is logical that PROSER2's association with androgens would be controlled by transcription factors in the SOX/SRY-sex/testis determining and related HMG box factors family. The E2F-myc activator/cell cycle regulator is also important because Myc has been implicated in cancer pathways, so this relationship with its transcription factor provides supplementary evidence of PROSER2's role as a potential biomarker of cancer.

== Clinical significance ==
Although PROSER2’s function in humans has not been elucidated, its SARG domain, interacting proteins/transcription factors, and expression patterns indicate that PROSER2 is involved in cell cycle control and apoptosis, and is androgen-responsive in nature. PROSER2 may be a biomarker of epithelial cell, breast, prostate, ovarian, lung, brain, and blood cancers as demonstrated in several US Patents.

=== Mutations ===
The human PROSER2 contains the following non-conservative single nucleotide polymorphisms (SNPs) within its exons that are conserved among all close homologs: D9N, C21G, G30S, R35Q, R40H, I69T, S71F, L46F, D83N, D109N, K200M, A412V, F345S, T408A, and L425P.
