= NCKAP1 =

Protein-coding gene in the species Homo sapiens

Identifiers
- Aliases: NCKAP1, HEM2, NAP1, NAP125, p125Nap1, NCK associated protein 1
- External IDs: OMIM: 604891; MGI: 1355333; GeneCards: NCKAP1
Available structures
PDB	Ortholog search: PDBe RCSB
PDB	List of PDB id codes 3P8C, 4N78

Gene location (Human)
Chr.	Chromosome 2 (human)
Band	2q32.1	Start	182,909,115 bp
Band	2q32.1	End	183,038,858 bp

Gene location (Mouse)
Chr.	Chromosome 2 (mouse)
Band	2 C3|2 48.21 cM	Start	80,330,856 bp
Band	2 C3|2 48.21 cM	End	80,411,724 bp
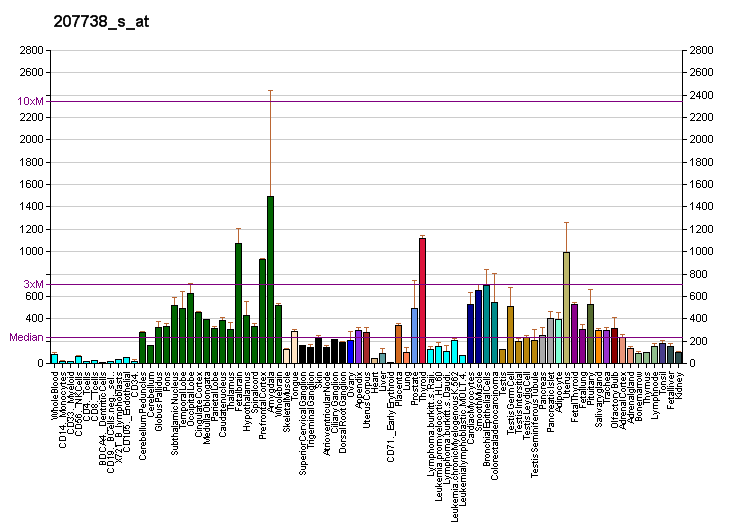
RNA expression pattern
Bgee	Human / Mouse (ortholog); Top expressed in: seminal vesicula; frontal pole; skin of arm; Epithelium of choroid plexus; cerebellar vermis; ganglionic eminence; ventricular zone; lateral nuclear group of thalamus; oral cavity; orbitofrontal cortex / Top expressed in: CA3 field; Region I of hippocampus proper; cingulate gyrus; dorsal striatum; amygdala; hippocampus proper; primary motor cortex; substantia nigra; central gray substance of midbrain; nucleus of stria terminalis; More reference expression data
BioGPS	More reference expression data
Gene ontology
Molecular function	protein-containing complex binding; protein binding
Cellular component	integral component of membrane; cytosol; cell projection; membrane; SCAR complex; focal adhesion; plasma membrane; extracellular exosome; lamellipodium membrane; ruffle; lamellipodium; filamentous actin
Biological process	Fc-gamma receptor signaling pathway involved in phagocytosis; positive regulation of Arp2/3 complex-mediated actin nucleation; central nervous system development; vascular endothelial growth factor receptor signaling pathway; Rac protein signal transduction; viral process; apoptotic process; positive regulation of lamellipodium assembly; positive regulation of actin filament polymerization; cell morphogenesis; cell migration; cell projection assembly; cortical actin cytoskeleton organization; neuron projection morphogenesis
Sources:Amigo / QuickGO
Orthologs
Databases	NCBI: entry; OMA: entry
Species	Human	Mouse
Entrez	10787	50884
Ensembl	ENSG00000061676	ENSMUSG00000027002
UniProt	Q9Y2A7	P28660
RefSeq (mRNA)	NM_013436; NM_205842	NM_001290745; NM_016965; NM_001355410; NM_001355411
RefSeq (protein)	NP_038464; NP_995314	NP_001277674; NP_058661; NP_001342339; NP_001342340
Location (UCSC)	Chr 2: 182.91 – 183.04 Mb	Chr 2: 80.33 – 80.41 Mb
PubMed search
- Wikidata
View/Edit Human	View/Edit Mouse

Nck-associated protein 1 is a protein that in humans is encoded by the NCKAP1 gene.

== Interactions ==
NCKAP1 has been shown to interact with RAC1 and ABI1.
