= ABI1 =

Protein-coding gene in the species Homo sapiens

Identifiers
- Aliases: ABI1, ABI-1, ABLBP4, E3B1, NAP1BP, SSH3BP, SSH3BP1, abl interactor 1
- External IDs: OMIM: 603050; MGI: 104913; GeneCards: ABI1

Gene location (Human)
Chr.	Chromosome 10 (human)
Band	10p12.1	Start	26,746,593 bp
Band	10p12.1	End	26,861,087 bp

Gene location (Mouse)
Chr.	Chromosome 2 (mouse)
Band	2 A3|2 15.18 cM	Start	22,830,085 bp
Band	2 A3|2 15.18 cM	End	22,930,253 bp
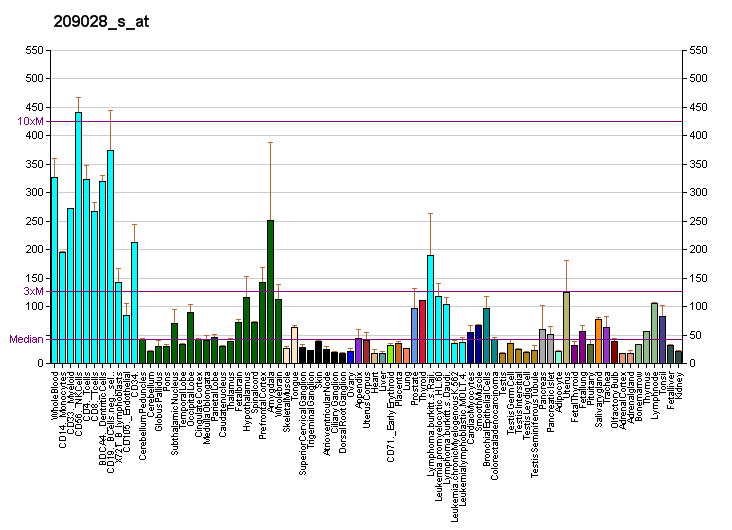

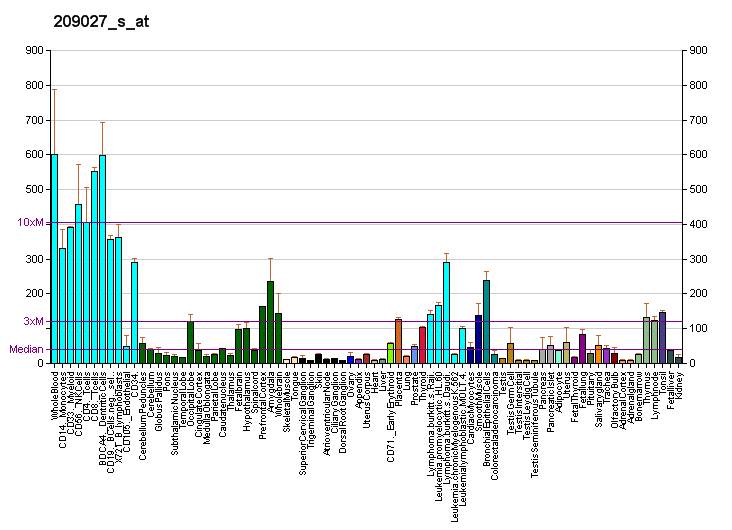
RNA expression pattern
Bgee	Human / Mouse (ortholog); Top expressed in: epithelium of nasopharynx; amniotic fluid; palpebral conjunctiva; cartilage tissue; oral cavity; bronchial epithelial cell; skin of arm; bone marrow; thymus; mucosa of paranasal sinus / Top expressed in: mesenteric lymph nodes; subiculum; granulocyte; lateral septal nucleus; left lung lobe; parotid gland; lobe of cerebellum; skin of external ear; anterior amygdaloid area; ventral tegmental area; More reference expression data
BioGPS	More reference expression data
Gene ontology
Molecular function	protein tyrosine kinase activator activity; protein-containing complex binding; cytoskeletal protein binding; protein binding; SH3 domain binding; cadherin binding
Cellular component	cytoplasm; cytosol; postsynaptic membrane; cell projection; postsynaptic density; SCAR complex; membrane; filopodium; growth cone; plasma membrane; synapse; intracellular anatomical structure; cell junction; cell leading edge; endoplasmic reticulum; neuron projection; extracellular exosome; cytoskeleton; nucleus; lamellipodium; filopodium tip
Biological process	somitogenesis; megakaryocyte development; Fc-gamma receptor signaling pathway involved in phagocytosis; transmembrane receptor protein tyrosine kinase signaling pathway; positive regulation of protein tyrosine kinase activity; vascular endothelial growth factor receptor signaling pathway; peptidyl-tyrosine phosphorylation; viral process; lamellipodium morphogenesis; negative regulation of cell population proliferation; dendrite morphogenesis; actin polymerization or depolymerization
Sources:Amigo / QuickGO
Orthologs
Databases	NCBI: entry; OMA: entry
Species	Human	Mouse
Entrez	10006	11308
Ensembl	ENSG00000136754	ENSMUSG00000058835
UniProt	Q8IZP0	Q8CBW3
RefSeq (mRNA)	NM_001012750; NM_001012751; NM_001012752; NM_001178116; NM_001178119 NM_001178120; NM_001178121; NM_001178122; NM_001178123; NM_001178124; NM_001178125; NM_005470; NM_001348029; NM_001348030; NM_001348031; NM_001348032; NM_001348033; NM_001348034	NM_001077190; NM_001077192; NM_001077193; NM_007380; NM_145994 NM_001331043; NM_001331044; NM_001331045; NM_001377510; NM_001377511; NM_001377512; NM_001377513
RefSeq (protein)	NP_001012768; NP_001012769; NP_001012770; NP_001171587; NP_001171590 NP_001171591; NP_001171592; NP_001171593; NP_001171594; NP_001171595; NP_001171596; NP_005461; NP_001334958; NP_001334959; NP_001334960; NP_001334961; NP_001334962; NP_001334963	NP_001070658; NP_001070660; NP_001070661; NP_001317972; NP_001317973 NP_001317974; NP_031406; NP_666106; NP_001364439; NP_001364440; NP_001364441; NP_001364442
Location (UCSC)	Chr 10: 26.75 – 26.86 Mb	Chr 2: 22.83 – 22.93 Mb
PubMed search
- Wikidata
View/Edit Human	View/Edit Mouse

Abl interactor 1 also known as Abelson interactor 1 (Abi-1) is a protein that in humans is encoded by the ABI1 gene.

== Function ==
Abl interactor 1 has been found to form a complex with EPS8 and SOS1, and is thought to be involved in the transduction of signals from Ras to Rac. In addition, the encoded protein may play a role in the regulation of EGF-induced Erk pathway activation as well as cytoskeletal reorganization and EGFR signaling. Several transcript variants encoding multiple isoforms have been found for this gene.

Abi1 is adaptor protein. It interacts with c-Abl and WAVE2 which is an actin polymerization regulator. It is known that Abi1 enhances the phosphorylation of WAVE2 by c-Abl. The phosphorylation of c-Abl promotes actin polymerization. Furthermore, Abi1 is a component of the WAVE complex. Some research has shown that knockdown of Abi1 by siRNA promoted degradation of WAVE complex proteins.

== Interactions ==
ABI1 has been shown to interact with

ENAH, NCKAP1, EPS8, and SOS1.
