= EPS8L2 =

Protein-coding gene in the species Homo sapiens

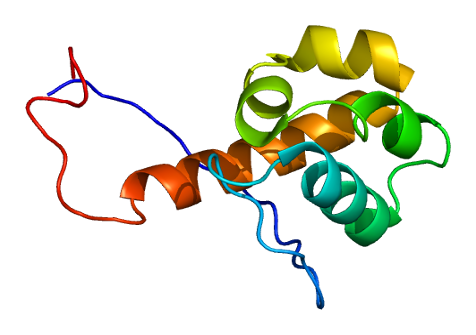

Identifiers
- Aliases: EPS8L2, EPS8R2, EPS8 like 2, DFNB106
- External IDs: OMIM: 614988; MGI: 2138828; GeneCards: EPS8L2
Available structures
PDB	Ortholog search: PDBe RCSB
PDB	List of PDB id codes 1WWU, 1WXB

Gene location (Human)
Chr.	Chromosome 11 (human)
Band	11p15.5	Start	694,438 bp
Band	11p15.5	End	727,727 bp

Gene location (Mouse)
Chr.	Chromosome 7 (mouse)
Band	7|7 F5	Start	140,918,793 bp
Band	7|7 F5	End	140,942,933 bp
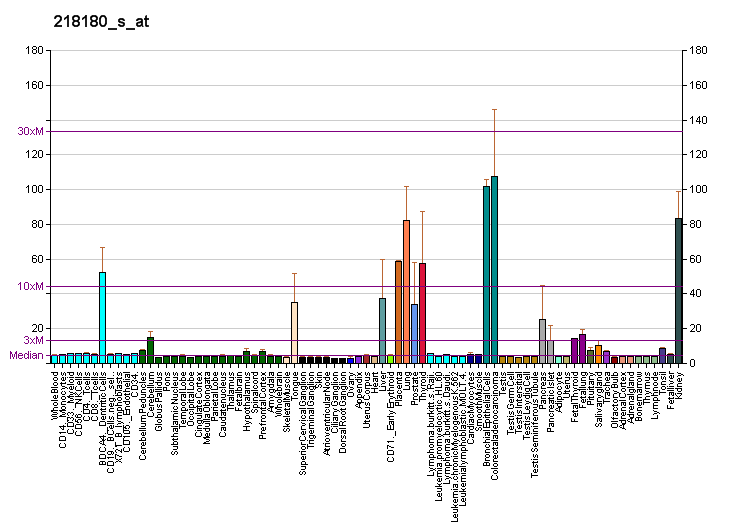
RNA expression pattern
Bgee	Human / Mouse (ortholog); Top expressed in: left lobe of thyroid gland; right lobe of thyroid gland; minor salivary glands; right lobe of liver; right uterine tube; mucosa of transverse colon; skin of abdomen; skin of leg; amniotic fluid; olfactory zone of nasal mucosa / Top expressed in: intestinal villus; esophagus; right kidney; lip; epithelium of small intestine; duodenum; yolk sac; ileum; jejunum; pyloric antrum; More reference expression data
BioGPS	More reference expression data
Gene ontology
Molecular function	actin binding; cadherin binding; protein binding
Cellular component	ruffle membrane; vesicle; plasma membrane; extracellular exosome; cytoplasm; cytosol; stereocilium bundle; stereocilium tip; stereocilium; protein-containing complex; cell projection
Biological process	regulation of Rho protein signal transduction; Rho protein signal transduction; positive regulation of ruffle assembly; hearing; regulation of molecular function
Sources:Amigo / QuickGO
Orthologs
Databases	NCBI: entry; OMA: entry
Species	Human	Mouse
Entrez	64787	98845
Ensembl	ENSG00000177106	ENSMUSG00000025504
UniProt	Q9H6S3	Q99K30
RefSeq (mRNA)	NM_022772	NM_133191
RefSeq (protein)	NP_073609	NP_573454
Location (UCSC)	Chr 11: 0.69 – 0.73 Mb	Chr 7: 140.92 – 140.94 Mb
PubMed search
- Wikidata
View/Edit Human	View/Edit Mouse

Epidermal growth factor receptor kinase substrate 8-like protein 2 is an enzyme that in humans is encoded by the EPS8L2 gene.

This gene encodes a protein that is related to epidermal growth factor receptor pathway substrate 8 (EPS8), a substrate for the epidermal growth factor receptor. The function of this protein is unknown.
