= EPS8L1 =

Protein-coding gene in the species Homo sapiens

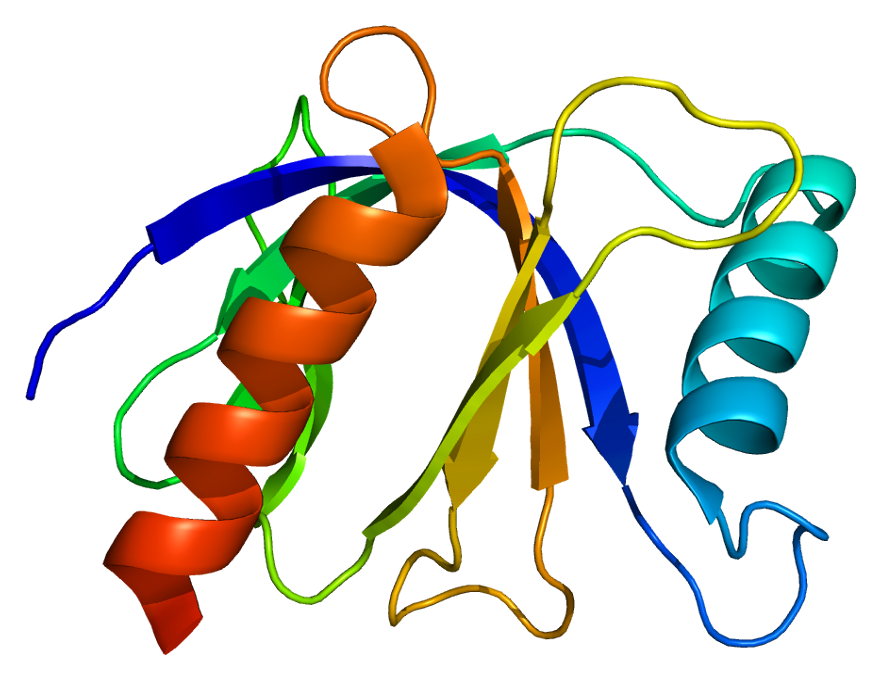

Identifiers
- Aliases: EPS8L1, DRC3, EPS8R1, PP10566, EPS8 like 1
- External IDs: OMIM: 614987; MGI: 1914675; GeneCards: EPS8L1
Available structures
PDB	Ortholog search: PDBe RCSB
PDB	List of PDB id codes 2K2M, 2ROL

Gene location (Human)
Chr.	Chromosome 19 (human)
Band	19q13.42	Start	55,072,020 bp
Band	19q13.42	End	55,087,923 bp

Gene location (Mouse)
Chr.	Chromosome 7 (mouse)
Band	7|7 A1	Start	4,463,673 bp
Band	7|7 A1	End	4,483,486 bp
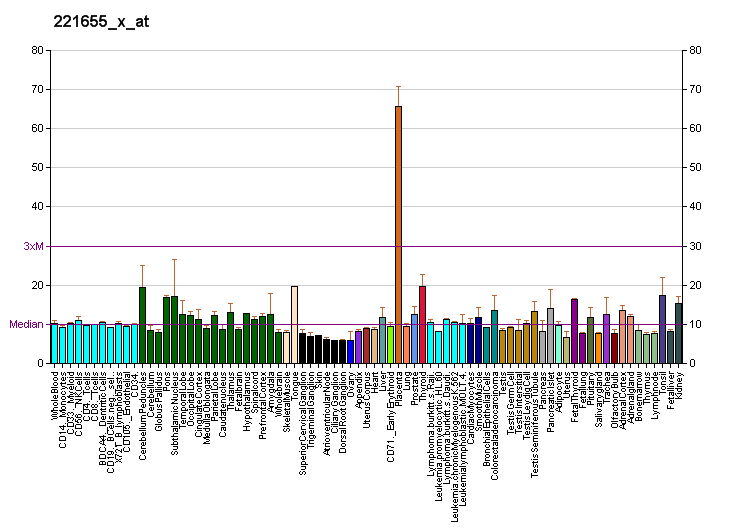

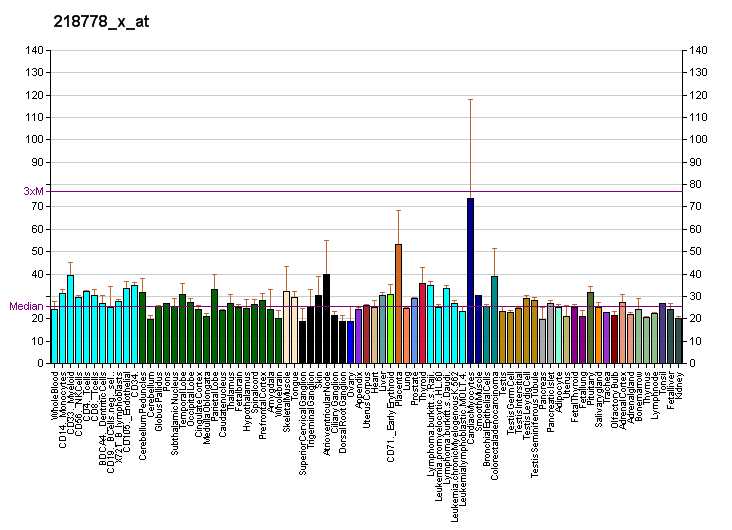

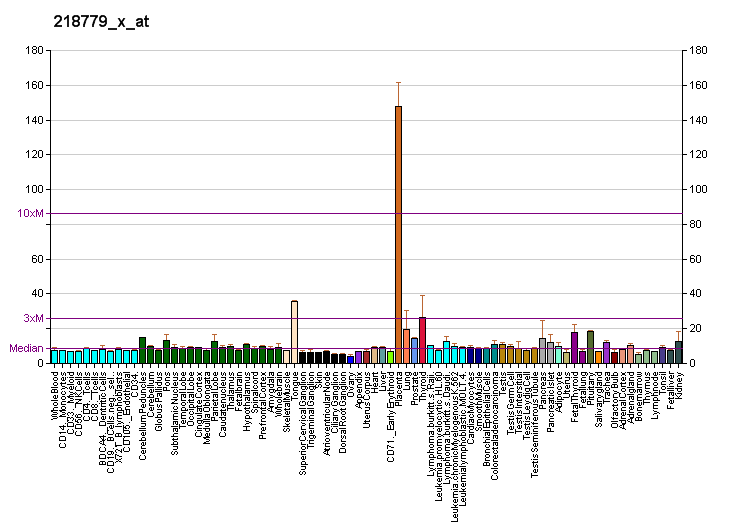
RNA expression pattern
Bgee	Human / Mouse (ortholog); Top expressed in: right uterine tube; buccal mucosa cell; skin of abdomen; skin of leg; amniotic fluid; right lobe of thyroid gland; left lobe of thyroid gland; pancreatic ductal cell; oral cavity; minor salivary glands / Top expressed in: esophagus; lip; skin of external ear; granulocyte; conjunctival fornix; skin of back; neural layer of retina; left lung lobe; right lung lobe; cornea; More reference expression data
BioGPS	More reference expression data
Gene ontology
Molecular function	actin binding; T cell receptor binding; protein binding; cadherin binding
Cellular component	ruffle membrane; extracellular exosome; cytoplasm; cytosol; plasma membrane; protein-containing complex
Biological process	regulation of Rho protein signal transduction; Rho protein signal transduction; positive regulation of ruffle assembly; regulation of molecular function
Sources:Amigo / QuickGO
Orthologs
Databases	NCBI: entry; OMA: entry
Species	Human	Mouse
Entrez	54869	67425
Ensembl	ENSG00000131037	ENSMUSG00000006154
UniProt	Q8TE68	Q8R5F8
RefSeq (mRNA)	NM_017729; NM_133180; NM_139204	NM_001290416; NM_026146; NM_001374622
RefSeq (protein)	NP_060199; NP_573441	NP_001277345; NP_080422; NP_001361551
Location (UCSC)	Chr 19: 55.07 – 55.09 Mb	Chr 7: 4.46 – 4.48 Mb
PubMed search
- Wikidata
View/Edit Human	View/Edit Mouse

Epidermal growth factor receptor kinase substrate 8-like protein 1 is an enzyme that in humans is encoded by the EPS8L1 gene.

This gene encodes a protein that is related to epidermal growth factor receptor pathway substrate 8 (EPS8), a substrate for the epidermal growth factor receptor. The function of this protein is unknown. Several alternatively spliced transcript variants encoding different isoforms exist.
