= EPS8L3 =

Protein-coding gene in humans

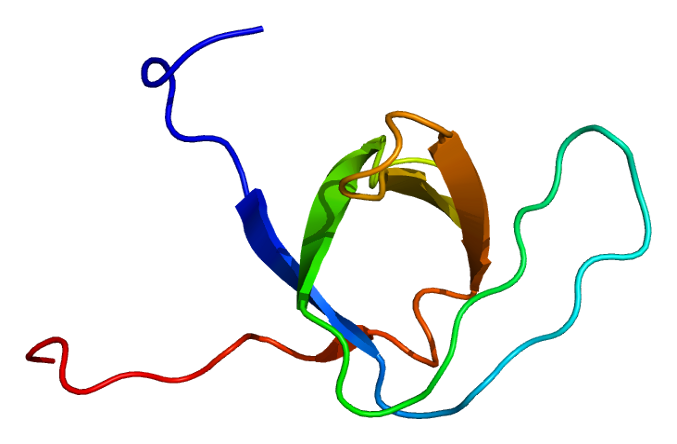

Identifiers
- Aliases: EPS8L3, EPS8R3, EPS8 like 3, HYPT5
- External IDs: OMIM: 614989; MGI: 2139743; GeneCards: EPS8L3
Available structures
PDB	Ortholog search: PDBe RCSB
PDB	List of PDB id codes 1WXT

Gene location (Human)
Chr.	Chromosome 1 (human)
Band	1p13.3	Start	109,750,080 bp
Band	1p13.3	End	109,764,027 bp

Gene location (Mouse)
Chr.	Chromosome 3 (mouse)
Band	3|3 F2.3	Start	107,784,545 bp
Band	3|3 F2.3	End	107,800,216 bp
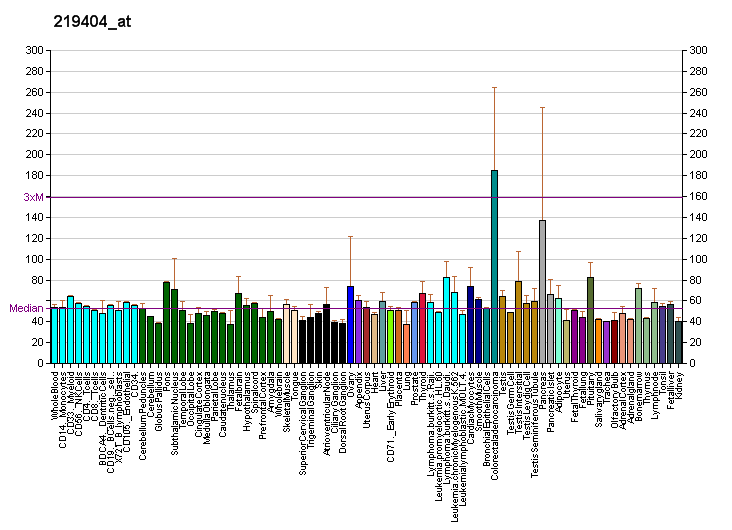
RNA expression pattern
Bgee	Human / Mouse (ortholog); Top expressed in: mucosa of transverse colon; rectum; mucosa of ileum; gallbladder; jejunal mucosa; duodenum; mucosa of sigmoid colon; gastric mucosa; pancreatic ductal cell; testicle / Top expressed in: intestinal villus; ileum; duodenum; epithelium of small intestine; large intestine; colon; jejunum; left colon; crypt of lieberkuhn of small intestine; zygote; More reference expression data
BioGPS	More reference expression data
Gene ontology
Molecular function	protein binding; actin filament binding; actin binding
Cellular component	cytoplasm; plasma membrane; ruffle membrane
Biological process	regulation of hair cycle; Rho protein signal transduction; regulation of Rho protein signal transduction; positive regulation of ruffle assembly
Sources:Amigo / QuickGO
Orthologs
Databases	NCBI: entry; OMA: entry
Species	Human	Mouse
Entrez	79574	99662
Ensembl	ENSG00000198758	ENSMUSG00000040600
UniProt	Q8TE67	Q91WL0
RefSeq (mRNA)	NM_024526; NM_133181; NM_139053; NM_001319952	NM_133867
RefSeq (protein)	NP_001306881; NP_078802; NP_573444; NP_620641	NP_598628
Location (UCSC)	Chr 1: 109.75 – 109.76 Mb	Chr 3: 107.78 – 107.8 Mb
PubMed search
- Wikidata
View/Edit Human	View/Edit Mouse

Epidermal growth factor receptor kinase substrate 8-like protein 3 is an enzyme that in humans is encoded by the EPS8L3 gene.

This gene encodes a protein that is related to epidermal growth factor receptor pathway substrate 8 (EPS8), a substrate for the epidermal growth factor receptor. The function of this protein is unknown. Alternatively spliced transcript variants encoding different isoforms exist.
