= TNS4 =

Protein-coding gene in the species Homo sapiens

Identifiers
- Aliases: TNS4, CTEN, PP14434, tensin 4
- External IDs: OMIM: 608385; MGI: 2144377; GeneCards: TNS4

Gene location (Human)
| Chr. | Chromosome 17 (human) |
| Band | 17q21.2 | Start | 40,475,828 bp |
| Band | 17q21.2 | End | 40,501,623 bp |

Gene location (Mouse)
| Chr. | Chromosome 11 (mouse) |
| Band | 11|11 D | Start | 98,956,504 bp |
| Band | 11|11 D | End | 98,980,132 bp |
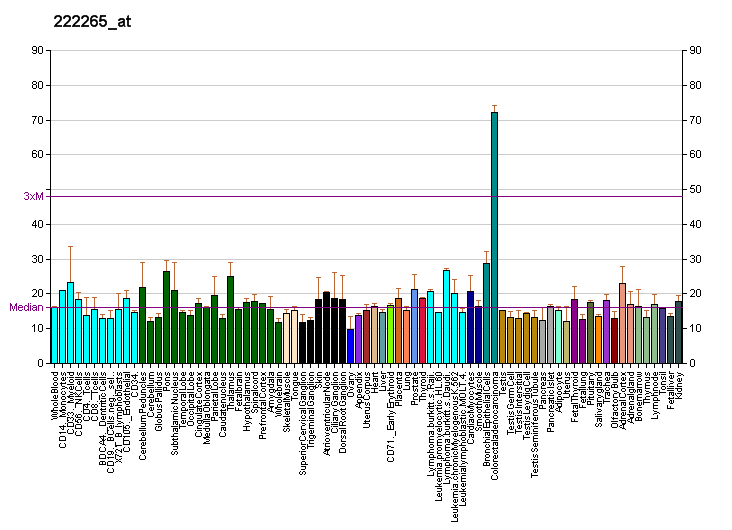
RNA expression pattern
| Bgee | Human / Mouse (ortholog); Top expressed in: skin of abdomen; skin of leg; minor salivary glands; olfactory zone of nasal mucosa; gingival epithelium; mucosa of paranasal sinus; lactiferous duct; nipple; vagina; skin of thigh / Top expressed in: left colon; lip; skin of external ear; transitional epithelium of urinary bladder; Paneth cell; cornea; epidermis; genital tubercle; esophagus; hair follicle; More reference expression data |
| BioGPS | More reference expression data |
Gene ontology
| Molecular function | actin binding; protein binding |
| Cellular component | cytoplasm; cell junction; cytoskeleton; focal adhesion; cytosol |
| Biological process | protein localization; apoptotic process |
Sources:Amigo / QuickGO
Orthologs
| Databases | NCBI: entry; OMA: entry |
| Species | Human | Mouse |
| Entrez | 84951 | 217169 |
| Ensembl | ENSG00000131746 | ENSMUSG00000017607 |
| UniProt | Q8IZW8 | Q8BZ33 |
| RefSeq (mRNA) | NM_032865 | NM_172564 |
| RefSeq (protein) | NP_116254 | NP_766152 |
| Location (UCSC) | Chr 17: 40.48 – 40.5 Mb | Chr 11: 98.96 – 98.98 Mb |
| PubMed search |
- Wikidata
| View/Edit Human | View/Edit Mouse |

Tensin-4 is a protein that in humans is encoded by the TNS4 gene.
