= FRS3 =

Protein-coding gene in the species Homo sapiens

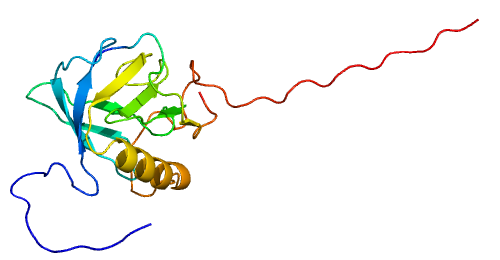
Available structures
PDB	Ortholog search: PDBe RCSB
PDB	List of PDB id codes 2KUP, 2KUQ, 2YS5, 2YT2

Identifiers
- Aliases: FRS3, FRS2-beta, FRS2B, FRS2beta, SNT-2, SNT2, fibroblast growth factor receptor substrate 3
- External IDs: OMIM: 607744; MGI: 2135965; HomoloGene: 4845; GeneCards: FRS3; OMA:FRS3 - orthologs

Gene location (Human)
Chr.	Chromosome 6 (human)
Band	6p21.1	Start	41,770,176 bp
Band	6p21.1	End	41,786,542 bp

Gene location (Mouse)
Chr.	Chromosome 17 (mouse)
Band	17|17 C	Start	47,999,955 bp
Band	17|17 C	End	48,015,211 bp
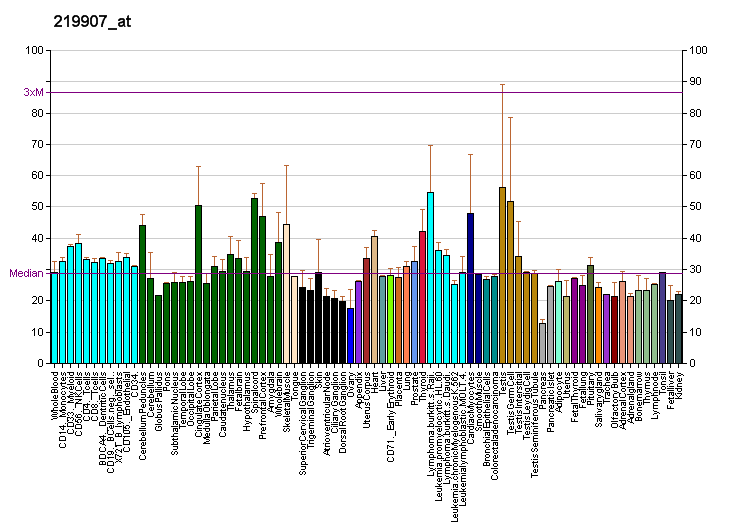
RNA expression pattern
Bgee	Human / Mouse (ortholog); Top expressed in: right hemisphere of cerebellum; anterior cingulate cortex; prefrontal cortex; right frontal lobe; Brodmann area 9; hypothalamus; amygdala; right testis; apex of heart; left testis / Top expressed in: neural layer of retina; spermatocyte; central gray substance of midbrain; yolk sac; primary visual cortex; cerebellar cortex; superior frontal gyrus; nucleus of stria terminalis; paraventricular nucleus of hypothalamus; seminiferous tubule; More reference expression data
BioGPS	More reference expression data
Gene ontology
Molecular function	protein binding; fibroblast growth factor receptor binding; identical protein binding
Cellular component	plasma membrane; membrane; intracellular anatomical structure
Biological process	fibroblast growth factor receptor signaling pathway; signal transduction; MAPK cascade
Sources:Amigo / QuickGO
Orthologs
Species	Human	Mouse
Entrez	10817	107971
Ensembl	ENSG00000137218	ENSMUSG00000023266
UniProt	O43559	Q91WJ0
RefSeq (mRNA)	NM_006653	NM_144939
RefSeq (protein)	NP_006644	NP_659188
Location (UCSC)	Chr 6: 41.77 – 41.79 Mb	Chr 17: 48 – 48.02 Mb
PubMed search
- Wikidata
View/Edit Human	View/Edit Mouse

Fibroblast growth factor receptor substrate 3 is a protein that in humans is encoded by the FRS3 gene.

The protein encoded by this gene is a substrate for the fibroblast growth factor receptor. It is found in peripheral plasma membrane and functions in linking FGF receptor stimulation to activators of Ras.
