= ENAH (gene) =

Protein-coding gene in humans

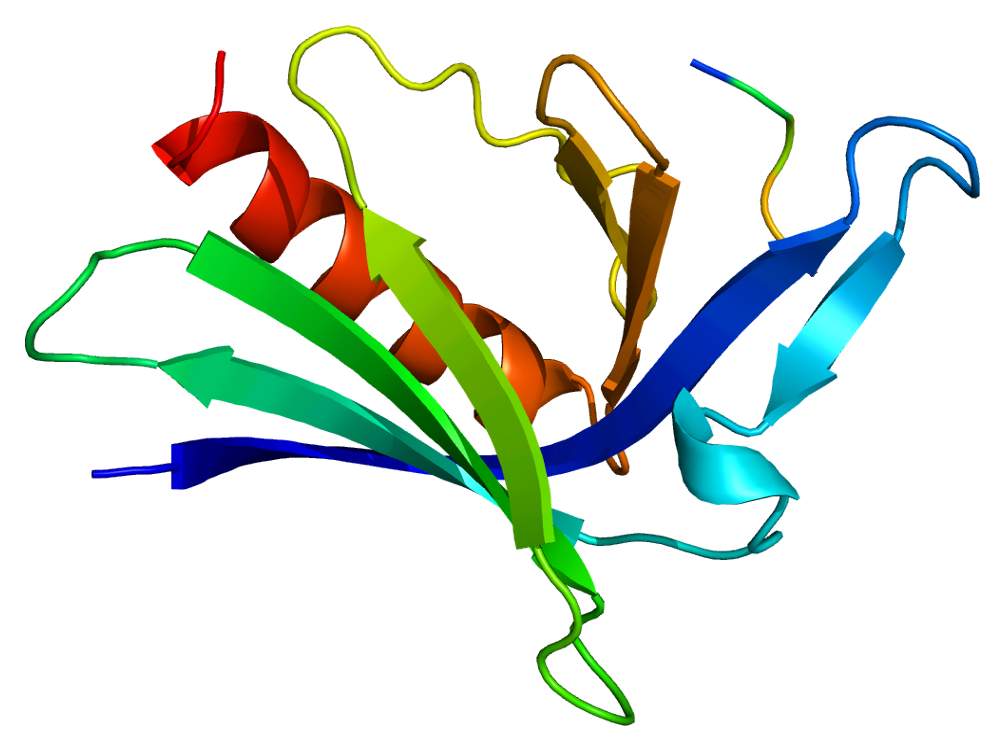

Identifiers
- Aliases: ENAH, ENA, MENA, NDPP1, enabled homolog (Drosophila), actin regulator
- External IDs: OMIM: 609061; MGI: 108360; GeneCards: ENAH
Available structures
PDB	Ortholog search: PDBe RCSB
PDB	List of PDB id codes 2HO2, 2IYB, 2XQN, 4MY6

Gene location (Human)
Chr.	Chromosome 1 (human)
Band	1q42.12	Start	225,486,835 bp
Band	1q42.12	End	225,653,142 bp

Gene location (Mouse)
Chr.	Chromosome 1 (mouse)
Band	1 H5|1 84.93 cM	Start	181,723,949 bp
Band	1 H5|1 84.93 cM	End	181,847,555 bp
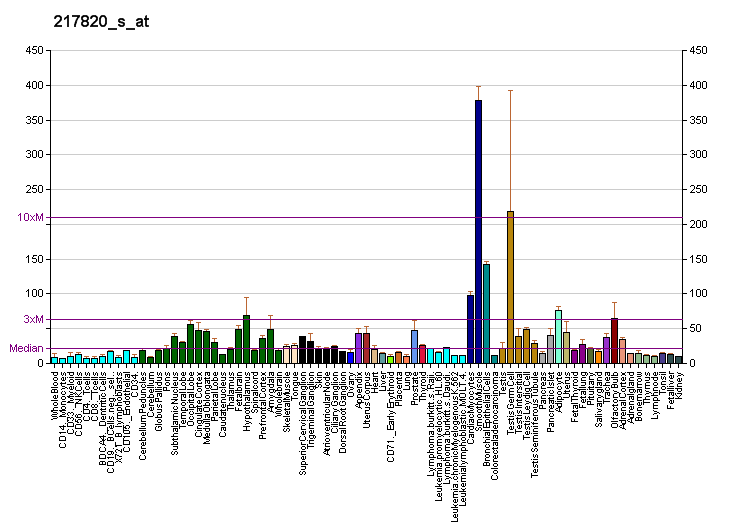
RNA expression pattern
Bgee	Human / Mouse (ortholog); Top expressed in: saphenous vein; epithelium of colon; secondary oocyte; vena cava; urethra; seminal vesicula; cardia; ventricular zone; Achilles tendon; Skeletal muscle tissue of rectus abdominis / Top expressed in: vestibular membrane of cochlear duct; Rostral migratory stream; ascending aorta; seminal vesicula; stria vascularis; vestibular sensory epithelium; genital tubercle; tail of embryo; medullary collecting duct; aortic valve; More reference expression data
BioGPS	More reference expression data
Gene ontology
Molecular function	SH3 domain binding; WW domain binding; actin binding; protein binding; profilin binding
Cellular component	filopodium; cell junction; plasma membrane; cell projection; synapse; cytoskeleton; focal adhesion; lamellipodium; cytoplasm; cytosol
Biological process	axon guidance; actin polymerization or depolymerization; actin polymerization-dependent cell motility
Sources:Amigo / QuickGO
Orthologs
Databases	NCBI: entry; OMA: entry
Species	Human	Mouse
Entrez	55740	13800
Ensembl	ENSG00000154380	ENSMUSG00000022995
UniProt	Q8N8S7	Q03173
RefSeq (mRNA)	NM_001008493; NM_018212	NM_001083120; NM_001083121; NM_008680; NM_010135
RefSeq (protein)	NP_001008493; NP_060682; NP_001364410; NP_001364411; NP_001364412	NP_001076589; NP_001076590; NP_032706; NP_034265
Location (UCSC)	Chr 1: 225.49 – 225.65 Mb	Chr 1: 181.72 – 181.85 Mb
PubMed search
- Wikidata
View/Edit Human	View/Edit Mouse

Protein enabled homolog is a protein that in humans is encoded by the ENAH gene.

== Interactions ==
ENAH has been shown to interact with ABI1, ZYX, and PCARE.
