= Docking protein 6 =

Protein-coding gene in the species Homo sapiens

DOK6

Identifiers
- Aliases: DOK6, DOK5L, HsT3226, docking protein 6
- External IDs: OMIM: 611402; MGI: 3639495; GeneCards: DOK6

Gene location (Human)
| Chr. | Chromosome 18 (human) |
| Band | 18q22.2 | Start | 69,400,888 bp |
| Band | 18q22.2 | End | 69,849,087 bp |

Gene location (Mouse)
| Chr. | Chromosome 18 (mouse) |
| Band | 18|18 E4 | Start | 89,310,548 bp |
| Band | 18|18 E4 | End | 89,787,652 bp |
RNA expression pattern
| Bgee | Human / Mouse (ortholog); Top expressed in: pars compacta; pars reticulata; Brodmann area 46; pons; endothelial cell; middle temporal gyrus; ganglionic eminence; entorhinal cortex; Brodmann area 23; spinal ganglia / Top expressed in: dentate gyrus of hippocampal formation granule cell; hippocampus proper; primary visual cortex; Cortex of frontal lobe; superior frontal gyrus; olfactory bulb; hypothalamus; striatum of neuraxis; cerebellar cortex; ganglionic eminence; More reference expression data |
| BioGPS | n/a |
Gene ontology
| Molecular function | protein binding |
| Cellular component | cytosol |
| Biological process | axon guidance |
Sources:Amigo / QuickGO
Orthologs
| Databases | NCBI: entry; OMA: entry |
| Species | Human | Mouse |
| Entrez | 220164 | 623279 |
| Ensembl | ENSG00000206052 | ENSMUSG00000073514 |
| UniProt | Q6PKX4 | Q2MHE5 |
| RefSeq (mRNA) | NM_152721 | NM_001039173 |
| RefSeq (protein) | NP_689934 | NP_001034262 |
| Location (UCSC) | Chr 18: 69.4 – 69.85 Mb | Chr 18: 89.31 – 89.79 Mb |
| PubMed search |
- Wikidata
| View/Edit Human | View/Edit Mouse |

Docking protein 6 is a protein that in humans is encoded by the DOK6 gene.

== Function ==
DOK6 is a member of the DOK (see DOK1; MIM 602919) family of intracellular adaptors that play a role in the RET (MIM 164761) signaling cascade (Crowder et al., 2004 [PubMed 15286081]).
