= SCRN1 =

Protein-coding gene in the species Homo sapiens

Identifiers
- Aliases: SCRN1, SES1, secernin 1
- External IDs: OMIM: 614965; MGI: 1917188; GeneCards: SCRN1

Gene location (Human)
Chr.	Chromosome 7 (human)
Band	7p14.3	Start	29,920,104 bp
Band	7p14.3	End	29,990,289 bp

Gene location (Mouse)
Chr.	Chromosome 6 (mouse)
Band	6|6 B3	Start	54,478,158 bp
Band	6|6 B3	End	54,543,474 bp
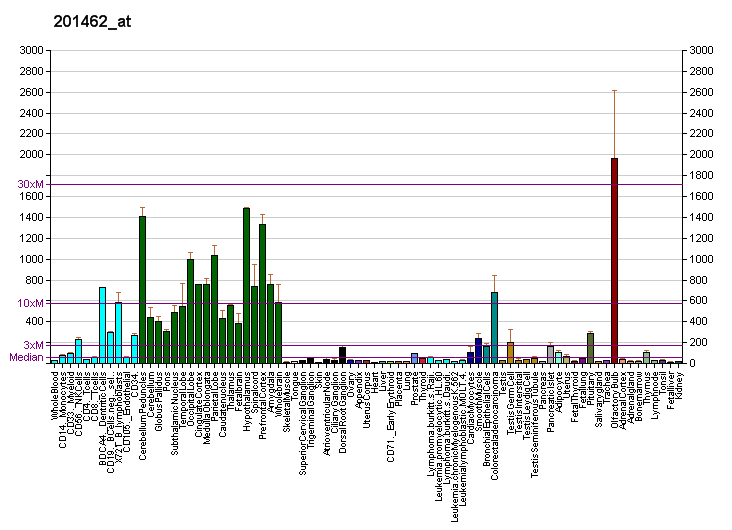
RNA expression pattern
Bgee	Human / Mouse (ortholog); Top expressed in: trigeminal ganglion; cerebellar vermis; ventricular zone; pons; pars reticulata; superior vestibular nucleus; olfactory bulb; pars compacta; paraflocculus of cerebellum; spinal ganglia / Top expressed in: otolith organ; utricle; habenula; superior cervical ganglion; paraventricular nucleus of hypothalamus; dorsal striatum; arcuate nucleus; median eminence; dorsomedial hypothalamic nucleus; ventral tegmental area; More reference expression data
BioGPS	More reference expression data
Gene ontology
Molecular function	protein binding; dipeptidase activity; molecular function
Cellular component	cytoplasm; nuclear membrane; nucleus
Biological process	proteolysis; exocytosis
Sources:Amigo / QuickGO
Orthologs
Databases	NCBI: entry; OMA: entry
Species	Human	Mouse
Entrez	9805	69938
Ensembl	ENSG00000136193	ENSMUSG00000019124
UniProt	Q12765	Q9CZC8
RefSeq (mRNA)	NM_001145513; NM_001145514; NM_001145515; NM_014766	NM_027268
RefSeq (protein)	NP_001138985; NP_001138986; NP_001138987; NP_055581	NP_081544
Location (UCSC)	Chr 7: 29.92 – 29.99 Mb	Chr 6: 54.48 – 54.54 Mb
PubMed search
- Wikidata
View/Edit Human	View/Edit Mouse

Secernin-1 is a protein that in humans is encoded by the SCRN1 gene.
