= DOK4 =

Protein-coding gene in the species Homo sapiens

Identifiers
- Aliases: DOK4, IRS-5, IRS5, docking protein 4
- External IDs: OMIM: 608333; MGI: 2148865; GeneCards: DOK4

Gene location (Human)
Chr.	Chromosome 16 (human)
Band	16q21	Start	57,471,922 bp
Band	16q21	End	57,487,327 bp

Gene location (Mouse)
Chr.	Chromosome 8 (mouse)
Band	8|8 C5	Start	95,590,456 bp
Band	8|8 C5	End	95,602,958 bp
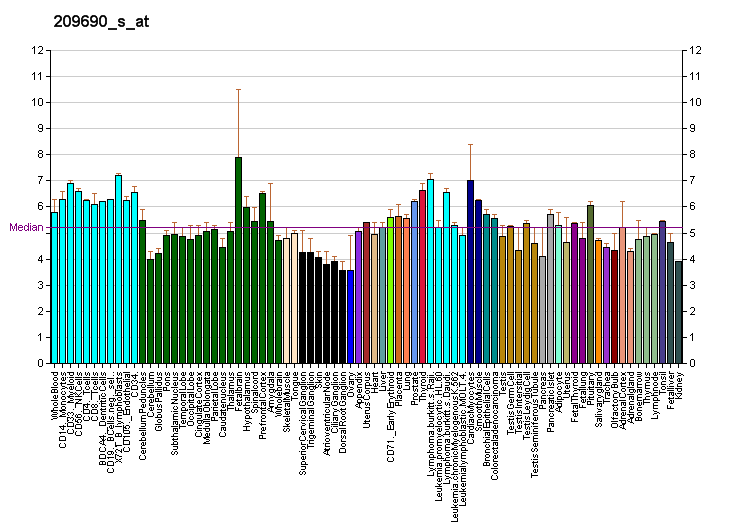

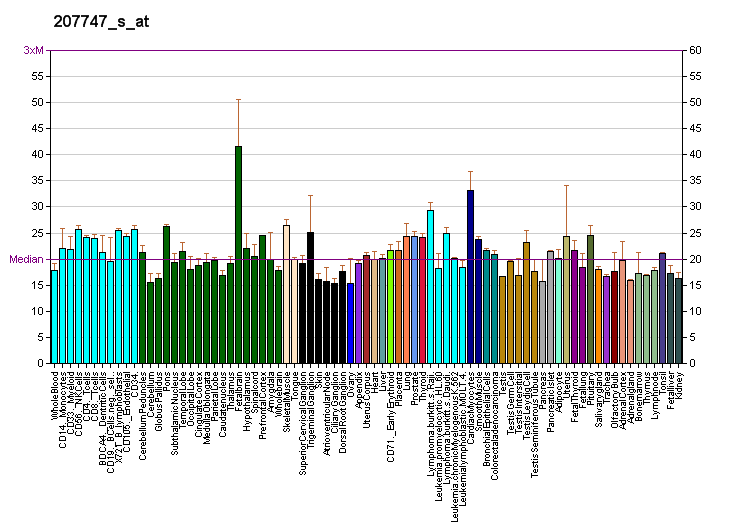

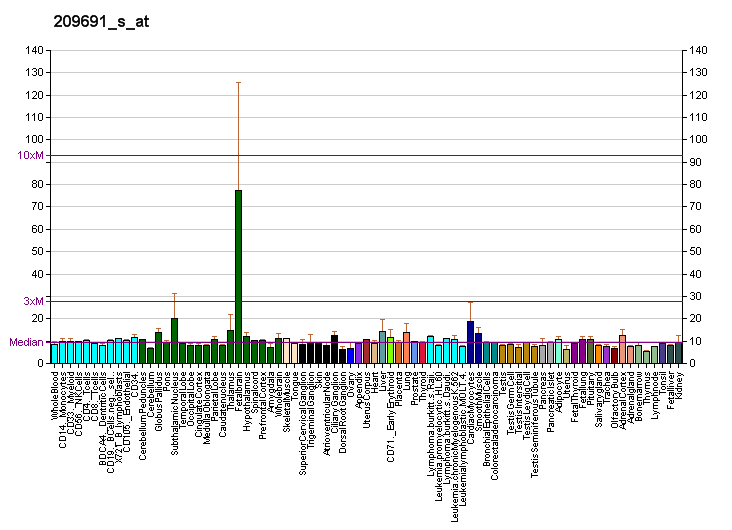
RNA expression pattern
Bgee	Human / Mouse (ortholog); Top expressed in: mucosa of transverse colon; tendon of biceps brachii; right coronary artery; duodenum; Descending thoracic aorta; rectum; ganglionic eminence; spinal ganglia; ascending aorta; skin of leg / Top expressed in: lumbar spinal ganglion; interventricular septum; intestinal villus; ileum; lip; jejunum; genital tubercle; duodenum; barrel cortex; left colon; More reference expression data
BioGPS	More reference expression data
Gene ontology
Molecular function	protein binding
Cellular component	cytosol
Biological process	axon guidance
Sources:Amigo / QuickGO
Orthologs
Databases	NCBI: entry; OMA: entry
Species	Human	Mouse
Entrez	55715	114255
Ensembl	ENSG00000125170	ENSMUSG00000040631
UniProt	Q8TEW6	Q99KE3
RefSeq (mRNA)	NM_018110; NM_001330556	NM_053246
RefSeq (protein)	NP_001317485; NP_060580; NP_001356547; NP_001356548; NP_001356549 NP_001356550	NP_444476
Location (UCSC)	Chr 16: 57.47 – 57.49 Mb	Chr 8: 95.59 – 95.6 Mb
PubMed search
- Wikidata
View/Edit Human	View/Edit Mouse

Docking protein 4 is a protein that in humans is encoded by the DOK4 gene.
