= EPS8 =

Protein-coding gene in humans

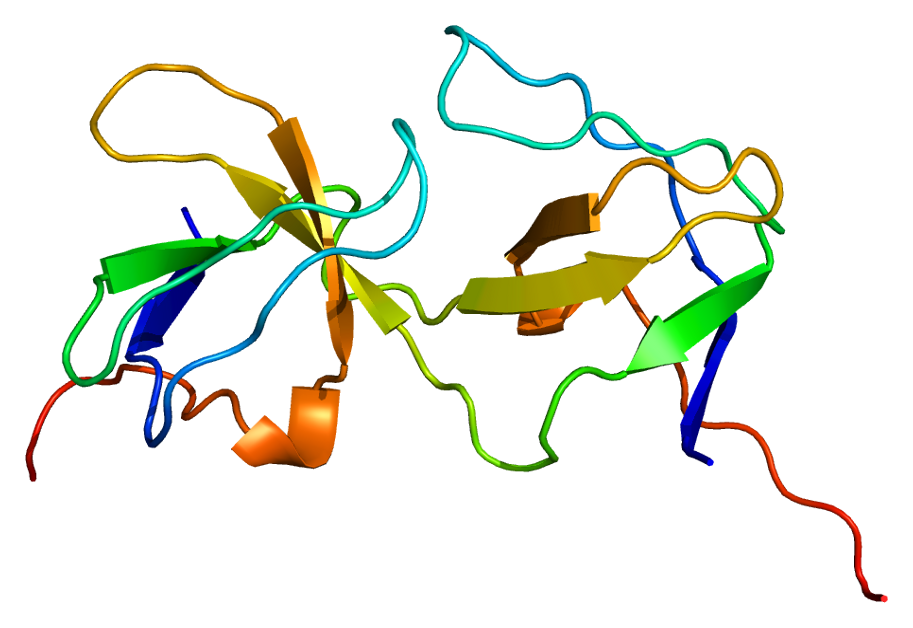

Identifiers
- Aliases: EPS8, DFNB102, epidermal growth factor receptor pathway substrate 8
- External IDs: OMIM: 600206; MGI: 104684; GeneCards: EPS8
Available structures
PDB	Ortholog search: PDBe RCSB
PDB	List of PDB id codes 2E8M

Gene location (Human)
Chr.	Chromosome 12 (human)
Band	12p12.3	Start	15,620,158 bp
Band	12p12.3	End	15,882,329 bp

Gene location (Mouse)
Chr.	Chromosome 6 (mouse)
Band	6 G1|6 66.78 cM	Start	137,454,243 bp
Band	6 G1|6 66.78 cM	End	137,631,874 bp
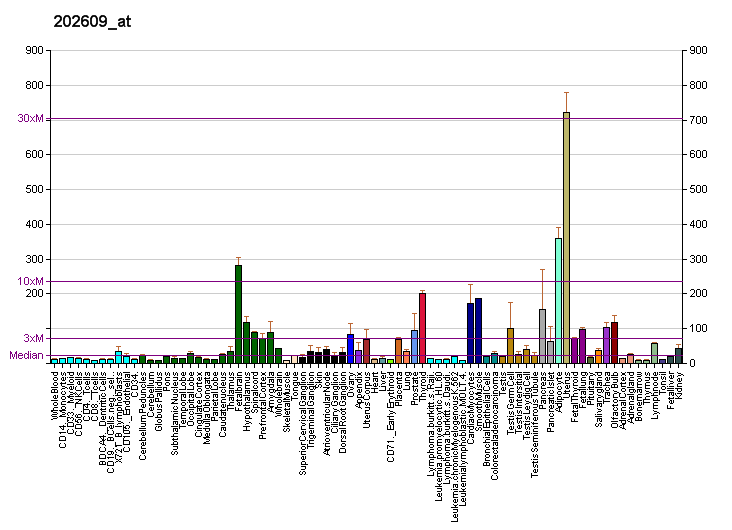
RNA expression pattern
Bgee	Human / Mouse (ortholog); Top expressed in: jejunal mucosa; mucosa of sigmoid colon; Achilles tendon; cartilage tissue; corpus epididymis; pericardium; tail of epididymis; popliteal artery; tibial arteries; synovial joint / Top expressed in: secondary oocyte; left colon; zygote; seminal vesicula; migratory enteric neural crest cell; primary oocyte; ileum; conjunctival fornix; right kidney; parotid gland; More reference expression data
BioGPS	More reference expression data
Gene ontology
Molecular function	signaling adaptor activity; protein binding; actin binding
Cellular component	cytoplasm; vesicle; cell projection; membrane; postsynaptic density; growth cone; plasma membrane; synapse; NMDA selective glutamate receptor complex; stereocilium; ruffle membrane; cell junction; cell cortex; brush border; neuron projection; extracellular exosome; stereocilium bundle; stereocilium tip; glutamatergic synapse
Biological process	actin cytoskeleton reorganization; actin polymerization-dependent cell motility; epidermal growth factor receptor signaling pathway; regulation of actin filament length; adult locomotory behavior; barbed-end actin filament capping; exit from mitosis; actin filament bundle assembly; dendritic cell migration; actin crosslink formation; regulation of cell shape; behavioral response to ethanol; cell population proliferation; Rac protein signal transduction; signal transduction; positive regulation of signal transduction; cellular response to leukemia inhibitory factor; Rho protein signal transduction; regulation of Rho protein signal transduction; regulation of postsynaptic membrane neurotransmitter receptor levels; positive regulation of ruffle assembly
Sources:Amigo / QuickGO
Orthologs
Databases	NCBI: entry; OMA: entry
Species	Human	Mouse
Entrez	2059	13860
Ensembl	ENSG00000151491	ENSMUSG00000015766
UniProt	Q12929	Q08509
RefSeq (mRNA)	NM_004447	NM_001271587; NM_001271588; NM_001271589; NM_001271595; NM_007945
RefSeq (protein)	NP_004438	NP_001258516; NP_001258517; NP_001258518; NP_001258524; NP_031971
Location (UCSC)	Chr 12: 15.62 – 15.88 Mb	Chr 6: 137.45 – 137.63 Mb
PubMed search
- Wikidata
View/Edit Human	View/Edit Mouse

Epidermal growth factor receptor kinase substrate 8 is an enzyme that in humans is encoded by the EPS8 gene.

== Function ==
This gene encodes a member of the EPS8 family. This protein contains one PH domain and one SH3 domain. It functions as part of the EGFR pathway, though its exact role has not been determined. Highly similar proteins in other organisms are involved in the transduction of signals from Ras to Rac and growth factor-mediated actin remodeling. Alternate transcriptional splice variants of this gene have been observed but have not been thoroughly characterized.

== Clinical significance ==
Mutations in EPS8 cause congenital deafness.

== Interactions ==
EPS8 has been shown to interact with:

- ABI1,
- BAIAP2,
- DVL1,
- SHB,
- SHC1
- SOS1, and
- Src.
